= List of sports cars =

This page is a compilation of sports cars, coupés, roadsters, kit cars, supercars, hypercars, electric sports cars, race cars, and super SUVs, both discontinued and still in production (or will be planned to produce). Cars that have sport trims (such as the Honda Civic SI) will be listed under the sport trims section. Production tunes will include cars modified by outside brands and then sold. This does not include in-house brands such as Ford's Special Vehicle Team, which will be included in the main list. Some vehicles are sold under different brands, therefore some vehicles may be listed more than once but usually link to the same page. Different countries/continents may also classify vehicles differently.

== List of sports cars ==
Manufacturer	Model	Years	Styles	Country of Origin	Notes
777 Motors	777 Hypercar	2022	Coupé	Italy	
999 Motorsports	Hacker	2012-2015	Coupé	Thailand	
999 Motorsports	Supersport	2012-2015	Coupé	Thailand	
A to Z Car Emporium	Concept 2000 GT	1988	Coupé	United States	
AAR	Eagle HF89	1989	Sports prototype	United States	
AAR	Eagle Mk III	1991	Sports prototype	United States	
AAT	1953 Commemorative Edition	2002-2004	Convertible	United States	
AAT	1953 Commemorative Edition Wagon	2004-2005	Shooting Brake	United States	
AAT	Heldo	2000	Coupé, Roadster	United States	Concept car
AB Performance	Arion S2	2015-present	Roadster	United Kingdom	
AB Performance	Arion S3	2018-present	Roadster	United Kingdom	
AB Performance	Sabre	2011-2019	Sports prototype	United Kingdom	
Abarth	124 Spider	2016-2019	Roadster	Italy	High performance version of the Fiat 124 Spider
Abarth	205A Berlinetta	1950-1951	Coupé	Italy	
Abarth	500	2008-present	Hatchback	Italy	
Abarth	500C	2010-2024	Cabriolet	Italy	
Abarth	500e	2023-present	Hatchback	Italy	
Abarth	500 Asssetto Corse	2008-2011	Hatchback	Italy	
Abarth	500 Esseesse	2009-2016	Hatchback	Italy	
Abarth	500 Ferrari Dealers Edition	2009	Hatchback	Italy	
Abarth	595	2012-2024	Hatchback	Italy	
Abarth	595 Competizione	2012-2024	Hatchback	Italy	
Abarth	595 Monster Energy Yamaha	2020-2021	Hatchback	Italy	
Abarth	600e	2024-present	Hatchback	Italy	
Abarth	695	2022-2024	Hatchback	Italy	
Abarth	695 Biposto Record	2015-2016	Hatchback	Italy	
Abarth	695 Edizione Maserati	2012-2014	Hatchback	Italy	
Abarth	695 Esseesse	2021-2022	Hatchback	Italy	
Abarth	695 Tributo Ferrari	2010-2013	Hatchback	Italy	
Abarth	2000 Coupe Speciale	1969	Coupé	Italy	
Abarth	2000 Sport Spider	1968-1969	Spyder	Italy	
Abarth	3000 SP	1968-1971	Spyder	Italy	
Abarth	Classiche 1000 SP	2022	Roadster	Italy	
Abarth	Classiche 1300 OT	2024	Coupé	Italy	
Abarth	Grande Punto S2000	2006-2010	Hatchback	Italy	
Abarth	Scorp-Ion	2011	Coupé	Italy	
Abarth	SE 030	1974	Coupé	Italy	
Abarth	SE 031	1975	Coupé	Italy	
Abarth	SE 037 Prototipo	1980	Coupé	Italy	
Abarth	Stola Monotipo	1998	Coupé	Italy	
Abarth	T140	1967	Sports prototype	Italy	
Abarth	X1/9 Prototipo	1973	Coupé	Italy	
ABS	Scorpion	1986-1991	Coupé	United Kingdom	
AC Cars	378 GT Zagato	2012-2014	Coupé	United Kingdom	
AC Cars	3000ME	1979-1985	Coupé	United Kingdom	
AC Cars	Ace	1953-1963	Roadster	United Kingdom	
AC Cars	Aceca	1954–1963	Coupé	United Kingdom	
AC Cars	Brooklands Ace	1993-2000	Roadster	United Kingdom	
AC Cars	Cobra	1962-1967	Roadster	United Kingdom	Also known as the Shelby Cobra
AC Cars	Cobra 212 S/C	2000	Roadster	United Kingdom	
AC Cars	Cobra 378	2017-2024	Roadster	United Kingdom	
AC Cars	Cobra GT Coupe	2024	Coupé	United Kingdom	
AC Cars	Cobra GT Roadster	2025-present	Roadster	United Kingdom	
AC Cars	GT SuperSport	2025	Roadster	United Kingdom	Limited to 25 units
AC Cars	Superblower	1997-2001	Coupé	United Kingdom	
AC Propulsion	tZero	1997-2003	Roadster	United States	
ACR	80	1980	Barchetta	Switzerland	
Active Power	GT40	2012–present	Coupé	United States	
Active Power	M6 GTR	2016–present	Coupé	United States	
Acura	Advanced Sports Car	2007	Coupé	Japan	
Acura	ARX-01a	2007	Le Mans Prototype	Japan	
Acura	ARX-01b	2008	Le Mans Prototype	Japan	
Acura	ARX-01c	2010	Le Mans Prototype	Japan	
Acura	ARX-01d	2011	Le Mans Prototype	Japan	
Acura	ARX-01e	2011	Le Mans Prototype	Japan	
Acura	ARX-01g	2011	Le Mans Prototype	Japan	
Acura	ARX-02a	2009	Le Mans Prototype	Japan	
Acura	ARX-05	2018	Le Mans Prototype	Japan	
Acura	ARX-06	2023	Le Mans Prototype	Japan	
Acura	DN-X	2002	Sedan	Japan	
Acura	Electric Vision Design Study	2023	Coupé	Japan	
Acura	Integra Type R	1997-2001	Coupé	Japan	
Acura	Integra Type S	2023–present	Liftback	Japan	
Acura	Integra Type S HRC Prototype	2024	Liftback	Japan	
Acura	NSX	2016-2022	Coupé	Japan	
Acura	NSX GT3 Evo	2019	Coupé	Japan	
Acura	NSX GT3 Evo22	2022	Coupé	Japan	
Acura	NSX Roadster	2012	Roadster	Japan	
Acura	NSX Type S	2021-2022	Coupé	Japan	Limited to 350 units
Acura	NSX Zanardi Edition	1999	Coupé	Japan	
Acura	RSX	2001-2006	Liftback	Japan	Also sold in Japan as Honda Integra
Acura	RSX A-Spec	2003-2006	Liftback	Japan	
Acura	TLX GT	2014	Sedan	Japan	
Acura	TLX Type S PMC Edition	2022-2023	Sedan	Japan	
Adamastor	Furia	2024	Coupé	Portugal	
Adamastor	P003RL	2018	Roadster	Portugal	
ADESS	02	2013	Le Mans Prototype	Portugal	
ADESS	03	2015	Le Mans Prototype	Portugal	
ADESS	AD25	2024	Le Mans Prototype	Portugal	
ADR Engineering	ADR Sport 2	2004	Sports prototype	United Kingdom	
ADR Engineering	ADR Sports 1000	2003	Sports prototype	United Kingdom	
ADR Engineering	ADR3 CN	2008	Sports prototype	United Kingdom	
Aeon	GT2 Aero S	2011–present	Coupé, Roadster	United Kingdom	
Aeon	GT3	2003–present	Coupé	United Kingdom	
Aeon	GT3 Spyder	2004–present	Spyder	United Kingdom	
Aerfal	Æ94	2025	Coupé	Netherlands	
Aerocon	Boa Type S	1978-1979	Coupé	United States	
Aeromaster	LMP	2012–present	Le Mans Prototype	Bulgaria	
Aestec	GTS	2018–2022	Coupé	Germany	
Aetek	FYK	2006	Coupé	Norway	Concept car
Aeterno	Condico	2015	Coupé	Thailand	
Agile	SC122	2017	Coupé	Denmark	
Agile	SCX	2017–present	Speedster	Denmark	
AGM	WLR	2003-2014	Roadster	United Kingdom	
Agustini	Le Jeux	1985	Coupé	Germany	
AGV Design	Veda	2003	Coupé	North Macedonia	
Ailef	696	1996-1998	Roadster	France	
Ailef	700	2000	Spyder	France	
Ailef	808	2008	Spyder	France	
AIM	EV Sport 01	2023	Coupé	Japan	
Aion	Hyptec SSR	2023–present	Coupé	China	
Air Dynamics	AD 355	1997	Coupé	United States	
Airconcept	Lion Super Sport	2010	Coupé	Germany	
Aixam	Mega Track	1992-2000	Coupé	France	
Ajlani	Drakuma	2019	Coupé	United Arab Emirates	Concept car
AK	Syrena Meluzyna R	2015	Coupé	Poland	
Alan Mann	GT40 Lightweight	1965	Coupé	United Kingdom	
Alba	AR2	1983	Le Mans Prototype	Italy	
Alba	AR3	1984	Le Mans Prototype	Italy	
Alba	AR4	1985	Le Mans Prototype	Italy	
Alba	AR5	1985	Le Mans Prototype	Italy	
Alba	AR6	1985	Le Mans Prototype	Italy	
Alba	AR7	1986	Le Mans Prototype	Italy	
Alba	AR8	1987	Le Mans Prototype	Italy	
Alba	AR20	1990	Le Mans Prototype	Italy	
Alcraft	GT	2017	Shooting Brake	United Kingdom	
Aldino	K/O	1986-present	Coupé	United States	
Alessi	AR-1	2012	Coupé	United States	
Alfa Romeo	2uettottanta	2010	Roadster	Italy	
Alfa Romeo	4C	2013-2020	Coupé, Roadster	Italy	One of the few Alfa Romeos offered first in the North American market
Alfa Romeo	4C Quadrifoglio	2019	Coupé	Italy	
Alfa Romeo	4C Spider	2015-2020	Roadster	Italy	
Alfa Romeo	4C Spider 33 Stradale Tribute	2020	Roadster	Italy	
Alfa Romeo	4C Spider Edizione Corsa	2018	Roadster	Italy	
Alfa Romeo	4C Unica	2023	Coupé	Italy	
Alfa Romeo	6C	1927-1954	Roadster	Italy	
Alfa Romeo	8C Competizione	2007-2010	Coupé	Italy	
Alfa Romeo	8C Spider	2008-2010	Roadster	Italy	
Alfa Romeo	33/2 Coupé Speciale	1969	Coupé	Italy	Concept car
Alfa Romeo	33 Spider Cuneo	1971	Roadster	Italy	Concept car
Alfa Romeo	33 Stradale	2024	Coupé	Italy	
Alfa Romeo	75 Turbo Evoluzione	1987	Sedan	Italy	
Alfa Romeo	75 Turbo Evoluzione IMSA	1987	Sedan	Italy	
Alfa Romeo	147 GTA Cup	2003	Hatchback	Italy	
Alfa Romeo	155 TS BTCC	1994	Sedan	Italy	
Alfa Romeo	155 V6 TI	1993-1996	Sedan	Italy	
Alfa Romeo	156 GTAm	2002	Sedan	Italy	
Alfa Romeo	156 Superturismo	1998-2002	Sedan	Italy	
Alfa Romeo	164 Procar	1988	Sedan	Italy	
Alfa Romeo	Alfetta GT	1979	Coupé	Italy	
Alfa Romeo	Alfetta GTV TurboDelta	1974-1987	Coupé	Italy	
Alfa Romeo	B.A.T. 11	2008	Coupé	Italy	
Alfa Romeo	Bella	1999	Coupé	Italy	
Alfa Romeo	Brera	2005-2010	Coupé	Italy	
Alfa Romeo	Caimano	1971	Coupé	Italy	
Alfa Romeo	Canguro	1964	Coupé	Italy	
Alfa Romeo	Carabo	1968	Coupé	Italy	
Alfa Romeo	Castagna Vittoria	1995	Coupé	Italy	
Alfa Romeo	Centauri	Roadster	Coupé	Italy	
Alfa Romeo	Dardo	1998	Roadster	Italy	
Alfa Romeo	Disco Volante	2013-2017	Coupé, Spyder	Italy	Limited production
Alfa Romeo	Diva	2006	Coupé	Italy	Concept car
Alfa Romeo	Giulia	1962-1978	Sedan	Italy	
Alfa Romeo	Giulia GTA	2020-2021	Sedan	Italy	
Alfa Romeo	Giulia GTAm	2020-2021	Sedan	Italy	
Alfa Romeo	Giulia Quadrifoglio	2016–present	Sedan	Italy	
Alfa Romeo	Giulia Quadrifoglio Luna Rossa	2026	Sedan	Italy	
Alfa Romeo	Giulia SWB Zagato	2022	Coupé	Italy	One-off model
Alfa Romeo	Giulietta TCR	2015	Hatchback	Italy	
Alfa Romeo	Gloria	2013	Sedan	Italy	
Alfa Romeo	GT	2003-2010	Coupé	Italy	
Alfa Romeo	GTV (916)	1994-2004	Coupé	Italy	
Alfa Romeo	GTV Conrero Challenge	1997	Coupé	Italy	
Alfa Romeo	Iguana	1969	Coupé	Italy	
Alfa Romeo	Issima	1996	Roadster	Italy	
Alfa Romeo	MiTo GTA	2009	Hatchback	Italy	
Alfa Romeo	Mole Costruzione Artigianale 001	2018	Coupé	Italy	
Alfa Romeo	Monospider	1998	Speedster	Italy	
Alfa Romeo	Montreal	1970-1977	Coupé	Italy	
Alfa Romeo	Navajo	1976	Coupé	Italy	
Alfa Romeo	Nuvola	1996	Coupé	Italy	
Alfa Romeo	Pandion	2010	Coupé	Italy	
Alfa Romeo	RL	1922-1927	Roadster	Italy	
Alfa Romeo	RZ	1992-1993	Roadster	Italy	
Alfa Romeo	Scighera	1997	Coupé	Italy	Concept car
Alfa Romeo	Scighera GT	1997	Coupé	Italy	
Alfa Romeo	SE 048SP	1990	Coupé	Italy	
Alfa Romeo	Spider	1966-1993	Roadster	Italy	
Alfa Romeo	Spider (916)	1993-2004	Roadster	Italy	
Alfa Romeo	Spider (939)	2006-2010	Roadster	Italy	
Alfa Romeo	Sprint	1976-1989	Coupé	Italy	
Alfa Romeo	SZ	1989-1991	Coupé	Italy	
Alfa Romeo	Tipo 33/3	1969-1971	Spyder	Italy	
Alfa Romeo	Tipo 33/4 Tasman Coupe	1969	Coupé	Italy	
Alfa Romeo	Tipo 33 Stradale	1967-1969	Coupé	Italy	
Alfa Romeo	TZ3 Corsa	2010	Coupé	Italy	
Alfa Romeo	TZ3 Stradale	2011-2012	Coupé	Italy	
Alfa Romeo	Vola	2001	Roadster	Italy	
Alieno	Arcanum	2018	Coupé	Bulgaria	
Alieno	Sentiero	2022	Coupé	Bulgaria	
Alieno	Unum	2022	Coupé	Bulgaria	
Allard	J2X-C	1992	Le Mans Prototype	United Kingdom	
Alma	Sprint	2024	Coupé	Portugal	
Almac	Sabre S2	2004-2010	Roadster	New Zealand	
Alpine	A106	1955-1961	Coupé	France	
Alpine	A108	1958-1965	Coupé	France	
Alpine	A110	1961-1977	Coupé	France	
Alpine	A110 Color Edition	2020	Coupé	France	
Alpine	A110 E-ternité	2022	Coupé	France	
Alpine	A110 GT4	2018	Coupé	France	
Alpine	A110 Légende GT	2020-2021	Coupé	France	
Alpine	A110 Pikes Peak	2023	Coupé	France	
Alpine	A110 Première Edition	2017-2018	Coupé	France	
Alpine	A110 R	2022–present	Coupé	France	Limited Production
Alpine	A110 R Fernando Alonso Edition	2022-2023	Coupé	France	
Alpine	A110 R Turini	2024-2026	Coupé	France	
Alpine	A110 R Ultime	2024–present	Coupé	France	
Alpine	A110 SportsX	2020	Coupé	France	
Alpine	A110 Tour de Corse 75	2022	Coupé	France	
Alpine	A110S	2019-2025	Coupé	France	
Alpine	A220	1968-1969	Coupé	France	
Alpine	A290_β	2023	Hatchback	France	
Alpine	A310	1971-1984	Coupé	France	
Alpine	A424	2024	Le Mans Prototype	France	
Alpine	A424_β	2024	Le Mans Prototype	France	
Alpine	A440	1973	Le Mans Prototype	France	
Alpine	A441	1974	Le Mans Prototype	France	
Alpine	A450	2013	Le Mans Prototype	France	
Alpine	A460	2016	Le Mans Prototype	France	
Alpine	A470	2017	Le Mans Prototype	France	
Alpine	A480	2021	Le Mans Prototype	France	
Alpine	A610	1991-1995	Coupé	France	
Alpine	A610 Albertville	1991	Coupé	France	
Alpine	A610 Magny-Cours	1992	Coupé	France	
Alpine	A4810	2022	Coupé	France	Concept car
Alpine	Alpenglow	2022	Coupé	France	Concept car
Alpine	Celebration	2015	Coupé	France	
Alpine	GTA Concept	2021	Coupé	France	
Alpine	Vision	2016	Coupé	France	
Alpine	Vision Gran Turismo	2015	Coupé	France	
ALS	Murtaya	2006–present	Roadster	United Kingdom	
Amalfi	Passero	1980	Coupé	United Kingdom	
Amber	One	2014	Roadster	Hungary	Concept car
AMC	AMX	1968-1970	Coupé	United States	
AMC	AMX/2	1969	Coupé	United States	
AMC	AMX/3	1969-1970	Coupé	United States	
AMC	Javelin Trans Am	1970	Coupé	United States	
AML	Lanta	2003	Coupé	Czech	
AMZ	Syrenka GT	2015	Coupé	Poland	
Analogue Automotive	SuperSport	2022–present	Roadster	United Kingdom	
Analogue Automotive	VHPK	2025	Roadster	United Kingdom	
Angelelli	Hintegrale	2021–present	Hatchback	Italy	
Anibal	Icon	2017	Coupé	Canada	
Apex	AP-0	2022–present	Coupé	England	Electric supercar, limited production
Apex	AP-1	2019–present	Speedster	England	
Apollo	Arrow	2016	Coupé	Germany	
Apollo	EVision S	2021	Coupé	Germany	
Apollo	G2J	2022	Coupé	Germany	
Apollo	Intensa Emozione	2019-2024	Coupé	Germany	Limited to 10 units
Apollo	N	2016-2017	Coupé	Germany	
Apollo	Project EVO	2021–present	Coupé	Germany	Limited to 10 units
Appulus+ IDIADA	Volar-E	2013	Coupé	Spain	
AQOS	Javier	2015	Coupé	Serbia	
AQOS	PM	2015	Coupé	Serbia	
AQOS	Zulu	2015	Coupé	Serbia	
Aquila	CR1	2008–present	Coupé	Denmark	
Ararkis	Sandstorm	2024	Coupé	United Kingdom	
Arash	AF8	2014-2016	Coupé	England	
Arash	AF8 Cassini	2016–present	Coupé	England	
Arash	AF8 Falcon Edition	2016-2021	Coupé	England	
Arash	AF10	2016–present	Coupé	England	
Arash	AFX	2021	Coupé	England	
Arash	AFX-8	2021	Coupé	England	
Arash	AFX-R	2021	Coupé	England	
Arash	Farboud GT	2002-2004	Coupé	England	
Arash	Imperium	2021	Coupé	England	
Arash	Imperium E	2021	Coupé	England	
Arash	Imperium Final Edition	2021	Coupé	England	
Arash	Imperium Launch Edition	2021	Coupé	England	
Arash	Imperium S	2021	Coupé	England	
ARC	Ellipse	1996-2000	Coupé	France	
Arcfox	7	2016	Coupé	China	
Arcfox	GT	2020–present	Coupé	China	
Arcspeed	Sports Roadster	2011	Roadster	Australia	
Ares Modena	Panther Evo	2023	Coupé	Italy	
Ares Modena	Panther ProgettoUno	2019–present	Coupé	Italy	
Ares Modena	S1 Gullwing First Edition	2024	Coupé	Italy	
Ares Modena	S1 Project	2021–present	Coupé	Italy	Limited to 24 units
Ares Modena	S1 Speedster	2022–present	Speedster	Italy	
Ares Modena	S1 Spyder	2022–present	Spyder	Italy	
Argo	JM16	1984	Coupé	United Kingdom	
Argo	JM19	1985	Coupé	United Kingdom	
Argo	JM20	1990	Coupé	United Kingdom	
Argo	JM21	1993	Spyder	United Kingdom	
Argyll	Turbo GT	1983-1990	Coupé	Scotland	
Aria	Fast Eddy	2016	Coupé	United States	
Aria	FXE	2019	Coupé	United States	
Ariel	Atom 1 120	1999-2002	Roadster	England	
Ariel	Atom 1 140	1999-2002	Roadster	England	
Ariel	Atom 1 190	2010-2011	Roadster	England	
Ariel	Atom 2 160	2005-2006	Roadster	England	
Ariel	Atom 2 220	2003-2007	Roadster	England	
Ariel	Atom 2 245	2003-2007	Roadster	England	
Ariel	Atom 2 300	2003-2007	Roadster	England	
Ariel	Atom 3 245	2008-2012	Roadster	England	
Ariel	Atom 3 300	2008-2012	Roadster	England	
Ariel	Atom 3S	2014-2018	Roadster	England	
Ariel	Atom 3 Mugen Edition	2011	Roadster	England	
Ariel	Atom 3.5	2012-2018	Roadster	England	
Ariel	Atom 3.5R	2014-2018	Roadster	England	
Ariel	Atom 500 V8	2010-2011	Roadster	England	Limited to 25 units
Ariel	Atom 4	2018–present	Roadster	England	
Ariel	Atom 4R	2023–present	Roadster	England	
Ariel	Atom 4RR	2025	Roadster	England	
Ariel	Hipercar	2024	Coupé	England	
Aries	LoCost	2007–present	Roadster	United Kingdom	
Arrera	Illyrian Pure Sport	2021	Coupé	Kosovo	
Arrera	Illyrian TSX	2024	Coupé	Kosovo	
Arrera	SD+	2021	Coupé	Kosovo	
Arrinera	Hussarya 33	2015	Coupé	Poland	
Arrinera	Hussarya GT	2016	Coupé	Poland	
Arrinera	Venocara	2011	Coupé	Poland	
Arrow	Clubman	1986–present	Roadster	Australia	
Art & Tech	Vera	1991	Coupé	Japan	
Artega	GT	2009-2012	Coupé	Germany	
Artega	Scalo Superelletra	2017	Coupé	Germany	Limited to 50 units
Ascari	A10	2006	Coupé	England	
Ascari	A410	2001	Le Mans Prototype	England	
Ascari	Ecosse	1997-2003	Coupé	England	
Ascari	FGT Prototype	1995	Coupé	England	
Ascari	FGT GT1	1995	Coupé	England	
Ascari	KZ1	2003-2010	Coupé	England	
Ascari	KZ1-R	2005-2010	Coupé	England	
Ascari	KZ1-R GT3	2003	Coupé	England	
ASL	Garaiya RS-01	2002-2005	Coupé	Japan	
ASL	Garaiya GT300	2003	Coupé	Japan	
Asor	180RA	2010	Roadster	Poland	
Aspark	Owl	2020–present	Coupé	Japan	Limited to 50 units
Aspark	Owl Roadster	2024	Roadster	Japan	
Aspark	Owl SP600	2024	Coupé	Japan	
Aspid	GT-21 Invictus	2012	Coupé	Spain	
Aspira	F620	2010-2012	Coupé	United Kingdom	
Aston Martin	AM RB-001	2016	Coupé	United Kingdom	Concept car
Aston Martin	AMR1	1989	Coupé	United Kingdom	Group C Endurance racing car
Aston Martin	AMR-One	2011	Spyder	United Kingdom	Le Mans Prototype racing car
Aston Martin	Bulldog	1979	Coupé	United Kingdom	One-off Concept car
Aston Martin	CC100 Speedster	2013	Speedster	United Kingdom	To celebrate its 100th anniversary, limited to two units
Aston Martin	DB AR1	2003-2004	Roadster	United Kingdom	Only 100 units for the United States market
Aston Martin	DB1	1948-1950	Roadster	United Kingdom	Limited to 15 units
Aston Martin	DB2	1950-1953	Coupé, Drophead Coupé	United Kingdom	
Aston Martin	DB2/4	1953-1957	Hatchback, Drophead Coupé	United Kingdom	
Aston Martin	DB2/4 Bertone Spider	1953	Roadster	United Kingdom	Limited production
Aston Martin	DB3	1951-1953	Roadster	United Kingdom	
Aston Martin	DB4 GT Zagato	1960-1963	Coupé	United Kingdom	
Aston Martin	DB5	1963-1965	Coupé, Convertible, Shooting Brake	United Kingdom	Only-1059 cars were produced
Aston Martin	DB6	1965-1971	Coupé, Convertible, Shooting Brake	United Kingdom	
Aston Martin	DB7	1994-2004	Coupé	United Kingdom	
Aston Martin	DB7 GT	2002-2003	Coupé	United Kingdom	
Aston Martin	DB7 Vantage	1999-2003	Coupé	United Kingdom	
Aston Martin	DB7 Vantage Volante	1999-2003	Convertible	United Kingdom	
Aston Martin	DB7 Volante	1996-2004	Convertible	United Kingdom	
Aston Martin	DB7 Zagato	2002-2003	Coupé	United Kingdom	Limited to 100 units
Aston Martin	DB9	2004-2016	Coupé	United Kingdom	
Aston Martin	DB9 Spyder Zagato Centennial	2013	Roadster	United Kingdom	Limited production
Aston Martin	DB9 Volante	2004-2016	Convertible	United Kingdom	
Aston Martin	DB10	2015	Coupé	United Kingdom	A bespoke model specially developed for the James Bond film 007 Spectre
Aston Martin	DB11	2016-2023	Coupé	United Kingdom	
Aston Martin	DB11 AMR	2018-2021	Coupé	United Kingdom	
Aston Martin	DB11 Volante	2018-2023	Convertible	United Kingdom	
Aston Martin	DB12	2023–present	Coupé	United Kingdom	
Aston Martin	DB12 Volante	2023–present	Convertible	United Kingdom	
Aston Martin	DBR1	1956-1959	Roadster	United Kingdom	Track car only
Aston Martin	DBR9 GT1	2004	Coupé	United Kingdom	
Aston Martin	DBR22	2022	Speedster	United Kingdom	To celebrates ten years of the manufacturer's Q personalization department, only 10 units planned to produce
Aston Martin	DBS	2007-2012	Coupé	United Kingdom	
Aston Martin	DBS Volante	2009-2012	Convertible	United Kingdom	
Aston Martin	DBS 770 Ultimate	2023	Coupé	United Kingdom	Limited to 300 units
Aston Martin	DBS 770 Ultimate Volante	2023-2024	Convertible	United Kingdom	Limited to 199 units
Aston Martin	DBS Coupé Zagato Centennial	2013	Coupé	United Kingdom	Limited production
Aston Martin	DBS GT Zagato	2019	Coupé	United Kingdom	Only 19 units will be built, and the car will be sold in pairs with DB4 GT Zagato Continuation
Aston Martin	DBS Superleggera	2018-2024	Coupé	United Kingdom	
Aston Martin	DBS Superleggera Volante	2019-2024	Convertible	United Kingdom	
Aston Martin	DPLM	1982	Coupé	United Kingdom	Prototype car
Aston Martin	One-77	2009-2012	Coupé	United Kingdom	Limited to 77 units
Aston Martin	Rapide AMR	2018	Sedan	United Kingdom	
Aston Martin	Rapide E	2019	Sedan	United Kingdom	Not to be produced
Aston Martin	Rapide S	2013-2018	Sedan	United Kingdom	
Aston Martin	RHAM/1	1977	Coupé	United Kingdom	Racecar
Aston Martin	Twenty Twenty	2001	Roadster	United Kingdom	
Aston Martin	V8 Vantage GT700R	2000	Coupé	United Kingdom	
Aston Martin	V8 Vantage Le Mans	1999	Coupé	United Kingdom	Limited to 40 units
Aston Martin	V8 Vantage V600	1998	Coupé	United Kingdom	
Aston Martin	V8 Zagato	1986-1990	Coupé	United Kingdom	Only 89 units were produced
Aston Martin	V12 Speedster	2021	Speedster	United Kingdom	Limited to 88 units
Aston Martin	V12 Vantage RS	2007	Coupé	United Kingdom	
Aston Martin	V12 Vantage S	2013-2018	Coupé	United Kingdom	
Aston Martin	V12 Vantage V600	2018	Coupé, Roadster	United Kingdom	
Aston Martin	V12 Zagato	2011	Coupé	United Kingdom	Limited to 150 units
Aston Martin	Valen	2027	Coupé	United Kingdom	Limited to 150 units
Aston Martin	Valhalla	2025–present	Coupé	United Kingdom	Limited to 500 units
Aston Martin	Valiant	2024	Coupé	United Kingdom	
Aston Martin	Valkyrie	2021-2024	Coupé, Convertible	United Kingdom	Limited to 150 units
Aston Martin	Valkyrie AMR Pro	2023	Coupé	United Kingdom	Track car only, limited to 40 units
Aston Martin	Valkyrie LM	2024	Coupé	United Kingdom	Limited to 10 units
Aston Martin	Valour	2024	Coupé	United Kingdom	
Aston Martin	Vanquish	2001-2007, 2012–2018, 2024-present	Coupé	United Kingdom	
Aston Martin	Vanquish Vision	2019	Coupé	United Kingdom	Concept car
Aston Martin	Vanquish Volante	2013-2018, 2026	Convertible	United Kingdom	
Aston Martin	Vanquish Zagato	2016-2019	Coupé, Convertible, Speedster	United Kingdom	Limited production
Aston Martin	Vanquish Zagato Shooting Brake	2019	Shooting Brake	United Kingdom	Limited to 99 units
Aston Martin	Vantage	1972-1973, 1977–1989, 2005–2018, 2018–present	Coupé, Roadster	United Kingdom	
Aston Martin	Vantage AMR	2017-2019	Coupé	United Kingdom	Limited production
Aston Martin	Vantage AMR GT3 Evo	2024	Coupé	United Kingdom	
Aston Martin	Vantage AMR Pro	2017	Coupé	United Kingdom	
Aston Martin	Vantage F1 Edition	2021-2024	Coupé, Roadster	United Kingdom	
Aston Martin	Vantage GT8	2016	Coupé	United Kingdom	
Aston Martin	Vantage GT12	2015	Coupé	United Kingdom	
Aston Martin	Vantage GTE	2018	Coupé	United Kingdom	
Aston Martin	Vantage N24	2006	Coupé	United Kingdom	
Aston Martin	Victor	2020	Coupé	United Kingdom	One-off bespoke built from Aston Martin's in-house Q Division
Aston Martin	Virage Shooting Brake Zagato	2014	Shooting Brake	United Kingdom	One-off model
Aston Martin	Vulcan	2015-2016	Coupé	United Kingdom	Track car only
Aston Martin	Vulcan AMR Pro	2017	Coupé	United Kingdom	
ATS	2500 GT	1963-1965	Coupé	Italy	
ATS	Corsa RR Turbo	2020–present	Coupé	Italy	
ATS	GT	2017–present	Coupé	Italy	
Audi	90 Quattro IMSA GTO	1989	Sedan	Germany	
Audi	200 Quattro Trans Am	1988	Sedan	Germany	
Audi	A1 Clubsport Quattro	2011	Hatchback	Germany	
Audi	A3 TDI Clubsport Quattro	2008	Hatchback	Germany	
Audi	A4 DTM 'R9'	2004	Sedan	Germany	
Audi	A4 Quattro Super Touring	1995-1997	Sedan	Germany	
Audi	AI:RACE	2018	Hatchback	Germany	
Audi	Avus Quattro	1991	Coupé	Germany	Concept car
Audi	Concept C	2025	Coupé, Roadster	Germany	
Audi	EP4	2023	Coupé	Germany	
Audi	e-tron Spyder	2010	Roadster	Germany	
Audi	e-tron Vision Gran Turismo	2018	Coupé	Germany	
Audi	GT50	2025	Coupé	Germany	
Audi	Le Mans Quattro	2003	Coupé	Germany	
Audi	Nanuk Quattro	2013	Coupé	Germany	
Audi	Nuvolari	2026	Coupè	Germany	
Audi	Quattro	1980-1991	Coupé	Germany	
Audi	Quattro Concept	2010	Coupé	Germany	
Audi	Quattro Spyder	1991	Coupé	Germany	
Audi	R8	2006-2015, 2015–2023	Coupé, Spyder	Germany	
Audi	R8 GT	2010-2013, 2022–2023	Coupé, Spyder	Germany	
Audi	R8 LMP900	2000	Spyder	Germany	
Audi	R8 LMS GT2	2019	Coupé	Germany	Racecar
Audi	R8 LMS Ultra	2012	Coupé	Germany	FIA GT3 Racecar
Audi	R8 LMX	2014	Coupé	Germany	
Audi	R8 Star of Lucis	2016	Coupé	Germany	
Audi	R8C	1998	Coupé	Germany	Le Mans Prototype racing car
Audi	R8R	1998	Spyder	Germany	Le Mans Prototype racing car
Audi	R10 TDI	2006	Spyder	Germany	
Audi	R15 TDI	2009	Spyder	Germany	
Audi	R18 e-tron Quattro	2012	Coupé	Germany	
Audi	R25	2008	Coupé	Germany	
Audi	Rosemeyer	2000	Coupé	Germany	Concept car
Audi	RS e-tron GT Performance	2024–present	Sedan	Germany	
Audi	RS2 Avant	1994-1995	Avant	Germany	
Audi	RS3	2011-2012, 2015–2020, 2021-present	Sportback, Sedan	Germany	
Audi	RS3 LMS	2016-2020, 2021–present	Sedan	Germany	
Audi	RS4	1999-2001, 2006–2008, 2012–2015, 2017–2024, 2024–present	Avant, Sedan, Cabriolet, Sportback	Germany	
Audi	RS4 SuperStars Series	2006	Sedan	Germany	
Audi	RS5	2010-2016, 2017–2024, 2024-present	Coupé, Cabriolet, Sportback, Avant	Germany	
Audi	RS5 Sportback	2018–present	Sportback	Germany	
Audi	RS5 Turbo DTM	2019	Coupé	Germany	
Audi	RS6	2002-2004, 2008–2010, 2013–2018, 2019–present	Sedan, Avant	Germany	
Audi	RS6 Avant GT	2024	Avant	Germany	
Audi	RS6 GTO	2020	Avant	Germany	
Audi	RS7 Sportback	2013-2017, 2019–present	Sportback	Germany	
Audi	S1 e-tron Quattro Hoonitron	2021	Coupé	Germany	
Audi	S2	1990-1995	Coupé, Avant, Sedan	Germany	
Audi	S3	1999-2003, 2006–2012, 2013–2020, 2020–present	Hatchback, Sportback, Sedan, Cabriolet	Germany	
Audi	S4	1991-1994, 1997–2001, 2003–2005, 2005–2008, 2009–2016, 2017-present	Sedan, Avant, Cabriolet	Germany	
Audi	S4 GTO	1992	Sedan	Germany	
Audi	S5	2007-2016, 2016–2024, 2024-present	Coupé, Cabriolet, Sportback	Germany	
Audi	S6	1994-1997, 1999–2003, 2006–2010, 2012–2018, 2019–present	Sedan, Avant	Germany	
Audi	S7 Sportback	2012-2017, 2019–present	Sportback	Germany	
Audi	Scorpion	2010	Coupé	Germany	
Audi	Skysphere	2021	Roadster	Germany	
Audi	Sport Quattro Concept	2013	Coupé	Germany	
Audi	Sport Quattro RS 002	1986	Coupé	Germany	
Audi	Sport Quattro S1 E2	1985	Coupé	Germany	
Audi	TT	1998-2006, 2006–2014, 2014–2023	Coupé, Roadster	Germany	
Audi	TT Clubsport Turbo	Coupé	2015	Germany	
Audi	TT Cup	Coupé	2015	Germany	
Audi	TT RS	2009-2014, 2016–2023	Coupé, Roadster	Germany	
Audi	V8 Quattro DTM	1990	Sedan	Germany	
Aurora	122-C	1990-1993	Coupé	Brazil	
Austin	7	1922-1939	Roadster	England	
Austin	A40 Sports	1950-1953	Roadster	England	
Austin	Atlantic	1949-1952	Roadster	England	
Austin	Twenty	1919-1930	Roadster	England	
Austin-Healey	100	1953-1956	Roadster	England	
Austin-Healey	100-6	1956-1959	Roadster	England	
Austin-Healey	3000	1959-1967	Roadster	England	
Austin-Healey	Sprite	1958-1971	Roadster	England	
Austro-Daimler	Bergmeister ADR 630	2019	Coupé	Austria	
Autozam	AZ-1	1992-1994	Coupé	Japan	
B Engineering	Edonis	2001-2006	Coupé	Italy	
B Engineering	Edonis SP-110	2018	Coupé	Italy	
BAC	Mono R	2019–present	Speedster	England	
Backdraft	Cobra	2001–present	Roadster	United States	
Badsey	Bullet	1982-1988	Tricycle	United States	
Bailey	LMP2	2011	Coupé	South Africa	
Baltasar	Revolt	2021	Speedster	Spain	
Baltasar	Revolt R	2025	Speedster	Spain	
Bandini	1000 Turbo Berlinetta	1992	Coupé	Italy	
Beck Kustoms	F132LM	2018	Coupé	New Zealand	
Beck	LM800	2007	Coupé	Switzerland	
Belchev	Xcar	2005	Coupé	Bulgaria	
Beltoise	BT01	2021-2025	Coupé	France	
Bennie	Purrie	2019	Coupé	Nigeria	
Bennie	Sternum	2024	Coupé	Nigeria	
Bentley	Batur Convertible	2024–present	Convertible	England	
Bentley	Continental GT	2003-2011, 2011–2018, 2018–2024, 2024–present	Coupé, Convertible	England	
Bentley	Continental GT Pikes Peak	2020-2021	Coupé	England	
Bentley	Continental GT Supersports	2009-2011, 2017–2018, 2025–2026	Coupé, Convertible	England	
Bentley	Continental GT Zagato	2008-2016	Coupé	England	Limited production, designed and built by Zagato
Bentley	Continental GT3-R	2014-2015	Coupé	England	About 300 units to be produced
Bentley	Continental T	1996-2003	Coupé	England	
Bentley	EXP 10 Speed 6	2015	Coupé	England	
Bentley	EXP 12 Speed 6e	2017	Roadster	England	
Bentley	EXP 100 GT	2019	Coupé	England	
Bentley	Hunaudières	1999	Coupé	England	Concept car
Bentley	Mulliner Bacalar	2020-2022	Roadster	England	Limited to 12 units
Bentley	Mulliner Batur	2022–present	Coupé, Convertible	England	Limited to 18 units
Bentley	Speed 8	2001	Coupé	England	Racecar
Bermat	GT-Pista	2021–present	Coupé	Italy	
Bertone	Birusa	2003	Coupé	Italy	
Bertone	Blitz	1992	Roadster	Italy	
Bertone	GB110	2024–present	Coupé	Italy	The world's first hypercar that will be able to use fuel made out of plastic waste, limited to 33 units
Bertone	Mantide	2009	Coupé	Italy	Concept car
Bertone	Nuccio	2012	Coupé	Italy	Concept car
Bertone	Runabout	2026	Barchetta, Targa	Italy	
Bitter	GT1	1998	Coupé	Germany	
Bitter	Tasco	1991	Coupé	Germany	
Bizzarrini	5300 GT Strada	1964-1968	Coupé	Italy	Limited to 133 units
Bizzarrini	BZ-2001	1993	Roadster	Italy	Concept car
Bizzarrini	Ghepardo	2006	Coupe	Italy	Concept car
Bizzarrini	Giotto	2026	Coupé	Italy	
Bizzarrini	GTS	2005-2006	Coupé	Italy	
Bizzarrini	Kjara	2000	Barchetta	Italy	
Bizzarrini	Livorno P538 Barchetta	2009	Barchetta	Italy	
Bizzarrini	Manta	1968	Coupe	Italy	Concept car designed by Italdesign
Bizzarrini	P538S	1965-1968	Barchetta	Italy	
Black Falcon	SBC-TT1750	2011	Coupé	Romania	
BMW	1 Series M Coupé	2011-2012	Coupé	Germany	
BMW	3.0 CSL	1971-1975	Coupé	Germany	Limited to 1,265 units
BMW	3.0 CSL Hommage	2015	Coupé	Germany	
BMW	3.0 CSL Hommage R	2015	Coupé	Germany	
BMW	3/15	1927-1932	Sedan, Cabriolet, Roadster	Germany	
BMW	134 Judd	2010	Coupé	Germany	
BMW	315/1	1934-1936	Roadster	Germany	
BMW	319/1	1934-1936	Roadster	Germany	
BMW	320si WTCC	2006	Sedan	Germany	
BMW	328	1936-1940	Roadster	Germany	
BMW	328 Hommage	2011	Roadster	Germany	
BMW	507	1956-1959	Roadster	Germany	
BMW	635CSi (E24)	1978-1989	Coupé	Germany	
BMW	635CSi Group A	1985	Coupé	Germany	
BMW	858 CSL	2024	Coupé	Germany	
BMW	2002 Hommage	2016	Coupé	Germany	
BMW	AVT	1981	Coupé	Germany	
BMW	GINA Light Visionary Model	2008	Roadster	Germany	
BMW	GTP	1986	Coupé	Germany	
BMW	H2R	2004	Spyder	Germany	
BMW	i8	2014-2020	Coupé, Roadster	Germany	Electric sports car
BMW	iFE.21	2020	Spyder	Germany	
BMW	M Hybrid V8	2022	Coupé	Germany	
BMW	M Roadster	1997-2002	Roadster	Germany	
BMW	M1	1978-1981	Coupé	Germany	
BMW	M1 Hommage	2008	Coupé	Germany	
BMW	M1 Procar	1979-1980	Coupé	Germany	
BMW	M2 (F87)	2015-2021	Coupé	Germany	
BMW	M2 (G87)	2023–present	Coupé	Germany	
BMW	M2 Competition	2018-2021	Coupé	Germany	
BMW	M2 CS (F87)	2020-2021	Coupé	Germany	
BMW	M2 CS (G87)	2025	Coupé	Germany	
BMW	M2 CS Racing	2020-2021	Coupé	Germany	
BMW	M2 Racing (G87)	2025	Coupé	Germany	
BMW	M3 (F80)	2014-2018	Sedan	Germany	
BMW	M3 (G80)	2020–present	Sedan	Germany	
BMW	M3 Competition (G80)	2020–present	Sedan	Germany	
BMW	M3 CSL	2003	Coupé	Germany	Limited production
BMW	M3 GT2	2009	Coupé	Germany	
BMW	M3 GT (E36)	1995	Coupé	Germany	
BMW	M3 GTR	2001	Coupé	Germany	
BMW	M3 GTS	2010-2011	Coupé	Germany	Limited production
BMW	M3 Lightweight	1995	Coupé	Germany	
BMW	M3 Sport Evolution	1990	Coupé	Germany	
BMW	M4 (F82)	2014-2020	Coupé	Germany	
BMW	M4 (G82	2020–present	Coupé	Germany	
BMW	M4 Competition	2020–present	Coupé	Germany	
BMW	M4 CS (F82)	2017-2019	Coupé	Germany	
BMW	M4 CS (G82)	2024–present	Coupé	Germany	
BMW	M4 CSL	2022-2023	Coupé	Germany	Limited production
BMW	M4 DTM	2014-2020	Coupé	Germany	
BMW	M4 GT3 Evo	2024	Coupé	Germany	
BMW	M4 GTS	2016	Coupé	Germany	Limited to 700 units
BMW	M4 Nürburgring Edition	2023	Coupé	Germany	
BMW	M5 (F90)	2017-2023	Sedan	Germany	
BMW	M5 (G90)	2024–present	Sedan	Germany	
BMW	M5 CS (F90)	2021-2022	Sedan	Germany	Limited production
BMW	M5 Competition (F90)	2018-2023	Sedan	Germany	
BMW	M5 Competition (G90)	2024–present	Sedan	Germany	
BMW	M6 (E63)	2005-2010	Coupé	Germany	
BMW	M6 (F13)	2012-2018	Coupé	Germany	
BMW	M6 Gran Coupé	2013-2018	Coupé	Germany	
BMW	M6 GTLM	2016	Coupé	Germany	
BMW	M8 (F92)	2019-2025	Coupé	Germany	
BMW	M8 Competition	2019–present	Coupé	Germany	
BMW	M8 Gran Coupé	2019–present	Coupé	Germany	
BMW	M8 GTE	2017	Coupé	Germany	Track car only
BMW	M240i Racing Cup	2018	Coupé	Germany	
BMW	M535i (E12)	1980-1981	Sedan	Germany	Limited Production
BMW	M535i (E28)	1984-1987	Sedan	Germany	
BMW	Nazca C2	1991	Coupé	Germany	Concept car designed by Italdesign-Giugiaro
BMW	Nazca M12	1991	Coupé	Germany	
BMW	Skytop	2025	Targa	Germany	Only 50 units
BMW	Speedtop	2025	Shooting Brake	Germany	
BMW	Turbo	1972-1973	Coupé	Germany	
BMW	V12 LM	1998	Coupé	Germany	
BMW	V12 LMR	1999	Roadster	Germany	
BMW	Vision EfficientDynamics	2009	Coupé	Germany	
BMW	Vision Gran Turismo	2014	Coupé	Germany	
BMW	Vision M Next	2019	Coupé	Germany	
BMW	Z1	1989-1991	Roadster	Germany	
BMW	Z3	1995-2002	Roadster, Coupé	Germany	
BMW	Z4 (E86)	2002-2008	Coupé	Germany	
BMW	Z4 (E89)	2009-2016	Coupé	Germany	
BMW	Z4 (G29)	2018–present	Roadster	Germany	
BMW	Z4 GTE	2013	Coupé	Germany	
BMW	Z4 GTLM	2013	Coupé	Germany	
BMW	Z4 M Coupe Motorsport	2006	Coupé	Germany	
BMW	Z8	1999-2003	Roadster	Germany	
BMW	Zagato Coupe	2012	Coupé	Germany	
Boldmen	CR4	2021–present	Roadster	Germany	
Boldmen	Cunard Icon Roadster	2025	Roadster	Germany	
Bolwell	Mk X Nagari 500	2020–present	Coupé	Australia	
Bourbon	Adonis	1993	Coupé	France	
Boutin	Belharra	2024–present	Coupé	France	
Bovensiepen	Zagato	2025	Coupé	Germany	
BR Engineering	BR01	2015	Coupé	Russia	
BR Engineering	BR03	2021	Coupé	Russia	
BR Engineering	BR1	2017	Coupé	Russia	
Brabham	BT62	2018-2024	Coupé	Australia	Track car only
Brabham	BT63 GT2	2021	Coupé	Australia	
Breckland	Beira	2008-2009	Roadster	United Kingdom	
Bristol	Bullet	2016	Speedster	United Kingdom	
Bristol	Fighter	2004-2011	Coupé	United Kingdom	
BRM	P154	1970	Spyder	United Kingdom	
BRM	P167	1971	Spyder	United Kingdom	
Brokernet	Silver Sting	2006	Coupé	Hungary	
Brutal	S1	2017–present	Coupé	Slovakia	
Bucci	Special	2013	Speedster	Argentina	
Buckle	Sports Coupe	1957-1959	Coupé	Australia	
Bufori	BMS R1	2009	Coupé	Malaysia	
Bufori	CS8	2025	Coupé	Malaysia	
Bugatti	16C Galibier	2009	Fastback	France	Concept car
Bugatti	18/3 Chiron	1999	Coupé	France	Concept car designed by Italdesign-Giugiaro
Bugatti	Atlantic	2015	Coupé	France	Concept car
Bugatti	Bolide	2024	Coupé	France	Limited to 40 units, the most extreme, lightweight, track-focused hypercar
Bugatti	Brouillard	2025	Coupé	France	One-off, first model in the Bugatti's Programme Solitaire
Bugatti	Centodieci	2022	Coupé	France	Limited to 10 units
Bugatti	Chiron	2016-2024	Coupé	France	Limited to 500 units
Bugatti	Chiron Hermès Edition	2019	Coupé	France	
Bugatti	Chiron L'Ébé	2022	Coupé	France	
Bugatti	Chiron Profilée	2022	Coupé	France	One-off model
Bugatti	Chiron Pur Sport	2020-2024	Coupé	France	Limited production
Bugatti	Chiron Sport	2018-2024	Coupé	France	
Bugatti	Chiron Super Sport	2021-2024	Coupé	France	Limited to 30 units
Bugatti	Chiron Super Sport 300+	2021-2022	Coupé	France	
Bugatti	Chiron Super Sport "57 One of One"	2023	Coupé	France	
Bugatti	Chiron Super Sport "Golden Era"	2023	Coupé	France	
Bugatti	Chiron Super Sport "L'Ultime"	2024	Coupé	France	
Bugatti	Chiron Super Sport "Vagues de Lumière"	2022	Coupé	France	
Bugatti	Destrier	2026	Coupé	France	One-off, third model in the Bugatti's Programme Solitaire
Bugatti	Divo	2021-2022	Coupé	France	Limited to 40 units
Bugatti	EB110 GT	1991-1995	Coupé	France	
Bugatti	EB110 PM1	1989	Coupé	France	
Bugatti	EB110 SS LM	1994	Coupé	France	
Bugatti	EB110 Super Sport	1992-1995	Coupé	France	Limited to 30 units
Bugatti	EB112	1993-1998	Fastback Coupé	France	Limited production, road legal concept car
Bugatti	EB118	1998	Fastback Coupé	France	Concept car
Bugatti	EB218	1999	Sedan	France	Concept car, designed by Itadesign Giugiaro
Bugatti	F.K.P. Hommage	2026	Coupé	France	One-off, second model in the Bugatti's Programme Solitaire
Bugatti	ID90	1990	Coupé	France	Concept car designed by Giugiaro
Bugatti	La Voiture Noire	2021	Coupé	France	One-off model and is the most expensive new car (above $18 million) in the world
Bugatti	Mistral	2024	Roadster	France	Limited to 99 units
Bugatti	Tourbillon	2024	Coupé	France	Limited to 250 units
Bugatti	Type 13	1910-1920	Roadster	France	
Bugatti	Type 18	1912-1914	Coupé, Roadster	France	
Bugatti	Type 55	1931-1935	Roadster	France	
Bugatti	Type 57SC Atalante	1936-1938	Coupé	France	
Bugatti	Type 252	1957-1962	Roadster	France	
Bugatti	Veyron 16.4 Grand Sport	2009-2015	Targa	France	
Bugatti	Veyron 16.4 Grand Sport Vitesse	2012-2015	Targa	France	
Bugatti	Veyron 16.4 Grand Sport Vitesse "L'Or Rouge"	2014	Roadster	France	
Bugatti	Veyron 16.4 Grand Sport Vitesse "La Finale"	2015	Coupé	France	
Bugatti	Veyron 16.4 Grand Sport Vitesse "Rembrandt"	2014	Roadster	France	
Bugatti	Veyron 16.4 Super Sport	2010-2011	Coupé	France	
Bugatti	Veyron 16.4 Super Sport World Record Edition	2010-2011	Coupé	France	
Bugatti	Veyron EB 16.4	2005-2011	Coupé, Targa	France	
Buick	Avista	2016	Coupé	United States	
Buick	Reatta	1988-1991	Coupé, Convertible	United States	
Buick	Wildcat Concept	1985	Coupé	United States	Concept car
Bulgari	Aluminium Vision Gran Turismo	2023	Barchetta	Italy	
Bullet	Roadster SS	2003-2009	Roadster	Australia	
Bultaco	Linx	2016	Roadster	Spain	
Bureau Seven	CN1600	2016–present	Roadster	Russia	
Bureau Seven	CN3500	2025	Roadster	Russia	
BXR	Bailey Blade GT1	2015	Coupé	United States	
BYD	Denza Z	2025	Coupé	China	
BYD	Yangwang U9	2024	Coupé	China	
Cadillac	ATS-V.R GT3	2014	Coupé	United States	
Cadillac	Cien	2002	Coupé	United States	Concept car
Cadillac	DPi-V.R	2016	Coupé	United States	
Cadillac	EcoJet	2006	Coupé	United States	
Cadillac	Northstar LMP	2000	Spyder	United States	
Cadillac	Northstar LMP-02	2002	Spyder	United States	
Cadillac	Opulent Velocity	2024	Coupé	United States	
Cadillac	Project GTP	2022	Coupé	United States	
Cadillac	V-Series.R	2022	Coupé	United States	
Cadillac	XLR	2003-2009	Roadster	United States	
Calafiore	C10 Astrea	2017	Coupé, Roadster	Italy	
Callaway	AeroWagen	2016	Shooting Brake	United States	
Callaway	Sledgehammer Corvette	1988	Coupé	United States	One-off prototype based on Corvette C4
Callaway	Speedster	1987-1991	Roadster	United States	Limited to 10 units
Callaway	C12	1997-2001	Coupé, Roadster	United States	Limited production, based on Chevrolet Corvette Z06 (C5)
Callaway	C16	2007-2013	Coupé, Roadster	United States	Limited production, based on Chevrolet Corvette (C6)
Callaway	C16 Speedster	2007	Open-top Roadster	United States	One-off model
Caparo	T1	2007-2015	Roadster	England	
Capricorn	01 Zagato	2025	Coupé	Germany	
Caterham	21	1994-1999	Roadster	England	
Caterham	AeroSeven	2013	Roadster	England	
Caterham	Project V	2023	Coupé	England	
Caterham	Seven	1973–present	Roadster	England	
Caterham	Seven 620R	2013–present	Roadster	England	
Caterham	Seven 620S	2016–present	Roadster	England	
Caterham	Seven CSR Twenty	2024	Roadster	England	
Çenberci	Diardi S	2000	Roadster	Turkey	
Centenari	M1	1991	Barchetta	Italy	
CG	1300	1972-1974	Coupé	France	
Changan	Chinese Dragon	2004	Roadster	China	
Chaparral	2A	1963	Spyder	United States	
Chaparral	2B	1964	Spyder	United States	
Chaparral	2C	1965	Spyder	United States	
Chaparral	2D	1966	Coupé	United States	
Chaparral	2E	1966	Spyder	United States	
Chaparral	2F	1967	Coupé	United States	
Chaparral	2G	1968	Spyder	United States	
Chaparral	2H	1969	Coupé	United States	
Chaparral	2J	1970	Spyder	United States	
Cheetah	G603	1983	Coupé	Switzerland	
Chevrolet	AeroVette	1973	Coupé	United States	
Chevrolet	AstroVette	1968	Roadster	United States	
Chevrolet	California IROC-Z	1985	Coupé	United States	
Chevrolet	Camaro	1967-1969, 1970–1981, 1982–1992, 1993–2002, 2010–2015, 2016–2024	Coupé, Convertible	United States	
Chevrolet	Camaro GS	2008	Coupé	United States	
Chevrolet	Chaparral 2X Vision Gran Turismo	2014	Spyder	United States	
Chevrolet	Corvette C3 IMSA SuperVette	1977	Coupé	United States	
Chevrolet	Corvette C5-R	1999	Coupé	United States	
Chevrolet	Corvette C6	2004-2013	Coupé	United States	
Chevrolet	Corvette C6.R	2005	Coupé	United States	
Chevrolet	Corvette C6 Grand Sport	2009-2013	Coupé	United States	
Chevrolet	Corvette C7	2013-2019	Coupé	United States	
Chevrolet	Corvette C7.R	2014	Coupé	United States	
Chevrolet	Corvette C7 Grand Sport	2016-2019	Coupé	United States	
Chevrolet	Corvette C7 Stingray	2013-2019	Coupé	United States	
Chevrolet	Corvette C8	2020–present	Coupé	United States	
Chevrolet	Corvette C8.R	2020	Coupé	United States	
Chevrolet	Corvette C8 Stingray	2020–present	Coupé	United States	
Chevrolet	Corvette CERV III	1990	Coupé	United States	Concept car
Chevrolet	Corvette CX	2025	Coupé	United States	
Chevrolet	Corvette CX.R Vision Gran Turismo	2025	Coupé	United States	
Chevrolet	Corvette Daytona Prototype	2012	Coupé	United States	
Chevrolet	Corvette EV	2025	Coupé	United States	
Chevrolet	Corvette GTP	1984	Coupé	United States	
Chevrolet	Corvette Indy	1985	Coupé	United States	Concept car
Chevrolet	Corvette Moray	2003	Coupé	United States	
Chevrolet	Corvette Nivola	1990	Targa	United States	Concept car designed by Bertone.
Chevrolet	Corvette Stingray Concept	2009	Coupé	United States	Concept car
Chevrolet	Miray	2011	Roadster	United States	
Chevrolet	Tru 140S	2012	Coupé	United States	
Chevrolet	WTCC Ultra	2006	Hatchback	United States	
Chrysler	Conquest	1987–1989	Coupé	United States	
Chrysler	Viper	1991–2010, 2013–2017	Roadster, Coupé	United States	Sold only in Europe
Chrysler	Atlantic	1995	Coupé	United States	Concept car
Chrysler	Prowler	1997-2002	Roadster	United States	Luxury variant of the Plymouth version
Chrysler	Crossfire	2003–2007	Roadster, Coupé	United States	
Chrysler	Firepower	2005	Coupé	United States	
Chrysler	ME Four-Twelve	2004	Coupé	United States	Concept car
Chrysler	Halcyon	2024	Coupé	United States	
Citroën	DS3 Racing	2010	Coupé	France	
Citroën	GT	2008	Coupé	France	Concept car
Citroën	Osée	2001	Coupé	France	
Citroën	Sbarro Picasso Cup	2002	Coupé	France	
Citroën	Survolt	2010	Coupé	France	Concept car
Citroën	Xsara WRC	2001	Coupé	France	
Cizeta	Moroder V16T	1991–present	Roadster, Coupé	Italy	
Clan	Crusader	1971-1974, 1982–1987	Coupé	England/Northern Ireland	
Climax	CR1	2006	Roadster	United Kingdom	
Colani	C112	1970	Coupé	Germany	
Colani	Carisma Spider	1993	Spyder	Germany	
Colani	Ferrari Testa D'Oro	1989	Coupé	Germany	
Colani	Shark Speedster	2002	Speedster	Germany	
Colani	Street-Ray	2006	Speedster	Germany	
Connaught	Type D	2005	Coupé	United Kingdom	
Contera	MD1	2015	Coupé	United Kingdom	
Corwin	Getaway	1969	Coupé	United States	Single prototype, now in collection of the Petersen Automobile Museum
Covini	C6W	2004–2006	Roadster, Coupé	Italy	
Cupra	DarkRebel	2023	Shooting Brake	Spain	
Czinger	21C	2021–present	Coupé, open-top roadster	United States	World's first 3D-printed hybrid hypercar, limited to 80 units (Coupé) and 30 units (Roadster)
Daewoo	G2X	2007–2009	Roadster	South Korea	
Dallara	Stradale	2017–present	Roadster	Italy	
Dauer	962 Le Mans	1993-1997	Coupé	Germany	Limited to 13 units
David Brown Automotive	Speedback GT	2014–present	Coupé	United Kingdom	
DAX	Rush	1991	Roadster	United Kingdom	
DC Design	Avanti	2012–present	Coupé	India	
DC Design	Gaia	2003	Coupé	India	
DC Design	Go	2004	Coupé	India	
DC Design	Taarzan	2004	Coupé	India	
Delage	D12	2021	Roadster, Coupé	France	Limited production
DeLorean Motor Company	DeLorean	1981-1983	Coupé	United States	
DeLorean Motor Company	Alpha5	2022	Coupé	United States	The Alpha5 is an electric concept car inspired by the DMC DeLorean
Design Performance	Barramunda	1994	Coupé	France	Concept car
Detroit Electric	SP.01	2013	Coupé	United Kingdom	
De Macross	Epique GT1	2011	Coupé	Canada	
De Tomaso	Vallelunga	1964-1967	Coupé	Italy	
De Tomaso	Mangusta	1966-1971	Coupé	Italy	
De Tomaso	Pantera	1971-1992	Coupé	Italy	
De Tomaso	Guarà	1994-2004	Coupé, Spyder	Italy	
De Tomaso	P72	2019–present	Coupé	Italy	Each of the 72 units will cost approximately US$845,000
De Tomaso	P900	2023	Coupé	Italy	Track car only, limited to 18 units
DEUS	Vayanne	2025	Coupé	Austria	Limited to 99 units
Devel	Sixteen	2022	Coupé	United Arab Emirates	Concept car
Devon	GTX	2009	Coupé	United States	Limited to two, based on Dodge Viper. The company was discontinued in 2013
Diatto	Ottovù Zagato	2007	Coupé	Italy	
Divergent	Blade	2015	Coupé	United States	
Dodge	Charger	1966-1978, 1982–1987, 2006–2024	Coupé/Sedan	United States	Muscle car
Dodge	Challenger	1958-1959, 1969–1974, 1978–1983, 2008–2024	Coupé	United States	Muscle car
Dodge	Conquest	1984-1986	Coupé	United States	North America only
Dodge	Stealth	1991-1996	Coupé	Japan	American Market Version of the Mitsubishi GTO, Became Badged as the 3000GT in America between 1996 and 2000
Dodge	Super Bee	1968-1971	Coupé	United States	Dodge counterpart to Plymouth Road Runner
Dodge	Viper	1992-2017	Coupé, Roadster	United States	SRT continued to use the viper
Dodge	Demon Roadster	2007	Roadster	United States	
Dodge	Circuit EV	2009	Coupé	United States	Concept car
Donkervoort	D8 GT	2007-2012	Coupé	Netherlands	
Donkervoort	D8 GTO	2013–2022	Roadster	Netherlands	
Donkervoort	D8 GTO RS	2016–2022	Roadster	Netherlands	
Donkervoort	D8 GTO-JD70	2019–2022	Roadster	Netherlands	Limited to 70 units, the world's first 2G super sports car
Donkervoort	F22	2023	Targa top	Netherlands	Limited to 75 units
Donkervoort	P24 RS	2026	Targa Top	Netherlands	Limited to 150 units
Drako	GTE	2020-	Electric Sports Sedan	United States	Limited production
DS Automobiles	E-Tense Performance	2022	Coupé	France	
DS Automobiles	X E-Tense	2018	Roadster	France	
DSD Design	Boreas	2017	Coupé	Spain	
Eadon Green	Zeclat	2018–present	Coupé	United Kingdom	
Eccentrica	V12	2024	Coupé	Italy	Lamborghini Diablo restomod, limited to 19 units
Ecurie	Ecosse LM69	2019	Coupé	United Kingdom	
ED Design	Torq	2015	Coupé	Italy	
EDAG	GenX	2004	Coupé	Germany	Concept car
Elation	Freedom	2020	Coupé	United States	
Elemental	RP1	2014–present	Roadster	United Kingdom	
Elfin Sports Cars	MS8 Streamliner	2006–present	Roadster	Australia	
Engler	F.F Superquad	2019	Quad Bike	Slovakia	
Enovate	ME-S	2019	Coupé	China	
Entop	Simurgh	2022	Coupé	Afghanistan	
Etox	Zafer	2007	Coupé	Turkey	
Evan	Series 3 LM	1999	Coupé	United States	
Exagon	Furtive-eGT	2010	Coupé	France	
Exotic Rides	W70	2015	Coupé	United States	
Fabcar	FDSC/03	2003	Coupé	United States	
Factor Aurelio Automobile (FAA)	Aurelio	2014	Coupé	Philippines	
Factory Five Racing	GTM	2006–2009	Coupé	United States	
Factory Five Racing	F9R		Coupé	United States	
Falcon	F7	2012–2017	Coupé	United States	
Faraday Future	FFZERO1	2016	Coupé	United States	Concept car
Felino	cB7R	2020	Coupé	Canada	
Ferrari	125 S	1947	Roadster	Italy	
Ferrari	159 S	1947	Roadster	Italy	
Ferrari	166 S	1948-1953	Roadster	Italy	Limited to 39 units
Ferrari	166 Spyder Corsa	1948	Spyder	Italy	
Ferrari	166 MM	1948-1950	Racecar	Italy	
Ferrari	166 Inter Stabilimenti Farina Cabriolet	1949-1950	Cabriolet	Italy	
Ferrari	166 F2	1948-1951	Racecar	Italy	
Ferrari	195 S	1950	Roadster	Italy	
Ferrari	212 Inter	1951	Coupé	Italy	
Ferrari	212 Export	1951	Coupé, Spyder, Cabriolet	Italy	
Ferrari	225 S	1952	Roadster	Italy	
Ferrari	250 Europa	1953-1954	Coupé	Italy	Limited production
Ferrari	250 MM Vignale Spyder	1953-1954	Roadster	Italy	
Ferrari	250 MM Pinin Farina Berlinetta	1953-1954	Coupé	Italy	
Ferrari	250 GT Boano Coupé	1955-1956	Coupé	Italy	
Ferrari	250 GT Zagato Coupé	1956-1957	Coupé	Italy	
Ferrari	250 GT Pininfarina	1958-1960	Coupé, Cabriolet	Italy	
Ferrari	250 GT Berlinetta SWB	1961-1963	Coupé	Italy	
Ferrari	250 GT California Spyder SWB	1960-1963	Roadster	Italy	
Ferrari	250 GT Berlinetta Lusso	1962-1964	Coupé	Italy	
Ferrari	250 Testa Rossa	1957-1961	Open-top Roadster	Italy	Racecar
Ferrari	250 GTO	1962-1964	Coupé	Italy	
Ferrari	250 LM	1963	Coupé	Italy	
Ferrari	275 GTB/ 275 GTS	1964-1966	Roadster, Coupé	Italy	
Ferrari	275 GTS/4 NART Spyder	1966-1968	Roadster	Italy	
Ferrari	330 TRI/LM	1962	Roadster	Italy	Le Mans Racecar
Ferrari	330 America	1963	Coupé	Italy	
Ferrari	330 GT LM Berlinetta	1963	Coupé	Italy	Racecar
Ferrari	330 GT 2+2	1964-1967	Coupé	Italy	
Ferrari	330 GT Navarro Speciale by Drogo	1966	Coupé	Italy	One-off model
Ferrari	330 GT by Michelotti	1967	Coupé	Italy	One-off model
Ferrari	330 GTC/ GTS	1966–1968	Coupé, Spyder	Italy	
Ferrari	330 GTC Zagato	1974	Coupé	Italy	One-off model
Ferrari	340/342 America	1950-1952	Spyder, Coupé	Italy	
Ferrari	375 America	1953-1954	Spyder, Coupé	Italy	
Ferrari	375 MM Spider Pinin Farina	1953-1954	Spyder	Italy	
Ferrari	375 MM Scaglietti Coupé Speciale	1954	Coupé	Italy	One-off model
Ferrari	375 MM Berlinetta Sport Speciale Pinin Farina	1955	Coupé	Italy	
Ferrari	410 Superamerica	1955-1959	Spyder, Coupé	Italy	
Ferrari	410 Superfast Pinin Farina Coupe Speciale	1956	Coupé	Italy	Limited production
Ferrari	400 Superamerica	1959-1964	Coupé, Cabriolet	Italy	
Ferrari	400 Superamerica Pinin Farina Coupe Speciale	1959	Coupé	Italy	
Ferrari	500 Superfast	1964-1966	Coupé	Italy	Limited production
Ferrari	500 Mondial	1953-1955	Spyder	Italy	
Ferrari	625 TF	1953		Italy	Ferrari's first four-cylinder closed-wheel sports racer
Ferrari	625 LM Touring Spyder	1956	Coupé	Italy	
Ferrari	625 TRC Scaglietti Spider	1957	Roadster	Italy	Limited to two units
Ferrari	750 Monza	1954-1955	Coupé	Italy	
Ferrari	860 Monza	1956	Coupé	Italy	
Ferrari	500 TRC	1956-1957		Italy	
Ferrari	350 Can-Am	1967	Speedster	Italy	
Ferrari	365 California	1966-1967	Roadster	Italy	
Ferrari	365 GTB/4 Daytona	1968-1973	Coupé	Italy	
Ferrari	365 GT4 BB	1973–1976	Coupé	Italy	
Ferrari	512 S	1970	Targa	Italy	Racecar
Ferrari	512 S Modulo	1970	Coupé	Italy	Concept Car, designed by Pininfarina
Ferrari	512 BB/ 512 BBi	1976–1984	Coupé	Italy	
Ferrari	512 BB LM	1978	Coupé	Italy	
Ferrari	412	1985-1989	Coupé	Italy	
Ferrari	246 GT/246 GTS Dino	1969-1974	Roadster	Italy	
Ferrari	208 GT4	1975-1980	Coupé	Italy	
Ferrari	208 GTB/GTS	1980-1981	Coupé	Italy	
Ferrari	288 GTO	1983-1987	Coupé	Italy	
Ferrari	288 GTO Evoluzione	1986	Coupé	Italy	Limited to five units
Ferrari	308 GT4 Dino	1973-1980	Coupé	Italy	
Ferrari	308 GTB/GTS	1975-1985	Roadster, Coupé	Italy	
Ferrari	328 GTB/GTS	1985-1989	Roadster, Coupé	Italy	
Ferrari	Mondial	1980-1993	Coupé, Cabriolet	Italy	
Ferrari	F40	1987-1992	Coupé	Italy	First production car to reach past 200 mph and was world's fastest car from 1987 to 1990
Ferrari	F40 LM	1989-1994	Coupé	Italy	Only 19 units produced
Ferrari	F40 LM Barchetta	1989	Speedster	Italy	One-off model
Ferrari	333 SP	1993-1995	Open-top Roadster	Italy	Racecar
Ferrari	348	1989-1995	Coupé, Targa	Italy	
Ferrari	348 Spider	1992-1995	Convertible	Italy	
Ferrari	348 GT Competizione	1993	Coupé	Italy	
Ferrari	348 GT Michelotto Competizione	1993	Coupé	Italy	
Ferrari	348 TB Zagato Elaborazione	1990	Coupé	Italy	
Ferrari	348 GT/C LM	1994	Coupé	Italy	
Ferrari	F355	1994-1999	Coupé, Convertible	Italy	
Ferrari	360 Modena	1999-2005	Roadster, Coupé	Italy	
Ferrari	360 Challenge Stradale	2003	Coupé	Italy	
Ferrari	360 N-GT	2002	Coupé	Italy	This racing car tuned by Michelotto for the N-GT category of the FIA GT Championship
Ferrari	Testarossa	1984-1991	Coupé	Italy	
Ferrari	Testarossa Spider	1986	Convertible	Italy	One-off model
Ferrari	Mythos	1989	Open-top Roadster	Italy	Concept car
Ferrari	512 TR	1991–1994	Coupé	Italy	
Ferrari	512 TR Spider	1993–1994	Convertible	Italy	Limited to three units
Ferrari	FZ93	1993-1994	Coupé	Italy	Limited production
Ferrari	F512 M	1992-1996	Coupé	Italy	
Ferrari	FX	1995	Coupé	Italy	One-off model, custom made for the 29th Sultan of Brunei
Ferrari	F50	1995-1997	Targa	Italy	Only 349 units were produced
Ferrari	F50 GT	1996	Coupé	Italy	Only three cars were produced
Ferrari	456 GT	1992-1997	Coupé	Italy	
Ferrari	456M GTA	1998-2002	Coupé	Italy	
Ferrari	550 Maranello	1996–2001	Coupé	Italy	
Ferrari	550 Prodrive	2001	Coupé	Italy	
Ferrari	550 Barchetta Pininfarina	2001	Roadster	Italy	
Ferrari	550 GTZ	2009	Roadster	Italy	Limited to five units
Ferrari	Rossa	2000	Open-top Speedster	Italy	One-off concept car, to celebrate Pininfarina's 70th anniversary.
Ferrari	575M Maranello	2002-2006	Coupé	Italy	
Ferrari	575 GTC	2004	Coupé	Italy	Racecar
Ferrari	Superamerica	2005-2006	Roadster	Italy	
Ferrari	575 GTZ	2006	Coupé	Italy	One-off model restyled and redesigned by Zagato
Ferrari	F430	2004-2009	Roadster, Coupé	Italy	
Ferrari	F430 Challenge	2006	Coupé	Italy	
Ferrari	F430 GT3	2006	Coupé	Italy	Racecar
Ferrari	430 Scuderia	2007-2009	Coupé	Italy	
Ferrari	Scuderia Spider 16M	2008-2009	Roadster	Italy	Only 499 units were produced, to commemorate Ferrari's 16th victory in the Formula 1 Constructor's World Championship in 2008
Ferrari	SP1	2008	Coupé	Italy	The first one-off special model produced by the Ferrari Portfolio Program
Ferrari	458 Italia	2009–2015	Roadster, Coupé	Italy	
Ferrari	458 Challenge	2010	Coupé	Italy	Racecar
Ferrari	458 Italia GT3	2011	Coupé	Italy	Racecar
Ferrari	458 Italia Grand Am	2011	Coupé	Italy	
Ferrari	SP12 EC	2012	Coupé	Italy	One-off model for guitarist Eric Clapton
Ferrari	458 Speciale	2013-2015	Coupé, Roadster	Italy	
Ferrari	458 MM Speciale	2016	Coupé	Italy	One-off model
Ferrari	Enzo Ferrari	2002-2004	Coupé	Italy	MSRP US $659,330, limited production
Ferrari	FXX/ FXX Evoluzione	2005	Coupé	Italy	Racecar
Ferrari	599 GTB Fiorano	2007-2012	Coupé	Italy	
Ferrari	599 GTO	2010-2012	Coupé	Italy	Limited to 599 units
Ferrari	SA Aperta	2011-2012	Roadster	Italy	Limited to 80 units
Ferrari	599 GTZ Nibbio Zagato	2008	Coupé	Italy	Limited to Nine units
Ferrari	599XX/ 599XX Evoluzione	2011	Coupé	Italy	Track car only
Ferrari	SP30 Arya	2012	Coupé	Italy	One-off model, built by Ferrari's Special Projects Division
Ferrari	LaFerrari	2013–2016	Coupé	Italy	First Ferrari with hybrid electric engine, limited production
Ferrari	LaFerrari Aperta	2016-2018	Roadster	Italy	Limited production
Ferrari	FXX-K	2015–2017	Coupé	Italy	Track car, only 40 units to be made
Ferrari	FXX-K Evo	2017–present	Coupé	Italy	Track car only
Ferrari	P4/5	2006	Coupé	Italy	One-off model designed by Pininfarina
Ferrari	612 Scaglietti	2004-2011	Coupé	Italy	
Ferrari	GTC4Lusso	2016-2020	Shooting Brake	Italy	
Ferrari	California	2008-2013	Convertible	Italy	
Ferrari	California T	2014-2017	Convertible	Italy	
Ferrari	Portofino	2017–2020	Convertible	Italy	
Ferrari	Portofino M	2020–2023	Convertible	Italy	
Ferrari	Roma	2020-2024	Coupé	Italy	
Ferrari	Roma Spider	2023–2025	Convertible	Italy	
Ferrari	Amalfi	2025	Coupé	Italy	
Ferrari	Amalfi Spider	2026	Convertible	Italy	
Ferrari	Monza SP1/ SP2	2019	Speedster	Italy	Limited to 400 units
Ferrari	Sergio	2015	Roadster	Italy	Limited to six units
Ferrari	J50	2016	Targa	Italy	Limited to 10 units for Japan only
Ferrari	488 GTB	2015–2019	Coupé, Roadster	Italy	
Ferrari	488 GT3	2016	Racecar	Italy	
Ferrari	488 GTE	2016	Racecar	Italy	
Ferrari	488 GT3 Evo 2020	2020	Racecar	Italy	
Ferrari	KC23	2023	Coupé	Italy	One-off special model designed by Ferrari Styling Centre
Ferrari	488 GT Modificata	2021	Racecar	Italy	Limited production
Ferrari	488 Challenge	2017	Coupé	Italy	Racecar
Ferrari	488 Challenge Evo	2020	Coupé	Italy	Racecar
Ferrari	SP38 Deborah	2018	Coupé	Italy	One-off model
Ferrari	488 Pista	2018–2020	Coupé, Roadster	Italy	Limited production
Ferrari	SP-8	2024	Open-top Roadster	Italy	One-off model
Ferrari	F8 Tributo	2020-2023	Coupé, Roadster	Italy	
Ferrari	HC25	2026	Open-top Roadster	Italy	One-off model
Ferrari	SP48 Unica	2022	Coupé	Italy	One-off model
Ferrari	P80/C	2019	Coupé	Italy	One-off Track car special built on the special request of a customer
Ferrari	296 GTB	2022–present	Coupé, Convertible	Italy	
Ferrari	296 Speciale	2025	Coupé, Convertible	Italy	
Ferrari	296 GT3	2023	Coupé	Italy	Race car
Ferrari	296 GT3 Evo	2026	Coupé	Italy	Race car
Ferrari	296 Challenge	2024	Coupé	Italy	Race car
Ferrari	SF90 Stradale	2020-2024	Coupé, Convertible	Italy	Ferrari's first series production plug-in hybrid supercar
Ferrari	SF90 XX Stradale	2024	Coupé	Italy	Limited to 799 units
Ferrari	SF90 XX Spider	2024	Convertible	Italy	Limited to 599 units
Ferrari	CZ26	2026	Coupé	Italy	One-off model
Ferrari	849 Testarossa	2026	Roadster, Coupé	Italy	
Ferrari	SC40	2025	Coupé	Italy	One-off model
Ferrari	F12 TRS	2014	Open-top Roadster	Italy	Limited to two units
Ferrari	F12berlinetta	2012-2016	Coupé	Italy	
Ferrari	F60 America	2015	Roadster	Italy	Limited to 10
Ferrari	F12 tdF	2016-2017	Coupé	Italy	
Ferrari	Berlinetta Lusso	2015	Coupé	Italy	One-off model designed by Carrozzeria Touring Superleggera
Ferrari	SP275 RW Competizione	2016	Coupé	Italy	One-off model and designed by Ferrari's Styling Centre with help from Pininfarina
Ferrari	FF	2011-2016	Fastback	Italy	
Ferrari	SP FFX	2014	Coupé	Italy	One-off model, built by Ferrari's Special Projects Division
Ferrari	GTC4Lusso/ GTC4Lusso T	2016–2020	Fastback	Italy	
Ferrari	BR20	2021	Fastback, Coupé	Italy	One-off model
Ferrari	Daytona SP3	2022	Roadster	Italy	Limited to 599 units
Ferrari	499P	2022	Coupé	Italy	Le Mans Hypercar (LMH)
Ferrari	F80	2025	Coupé	Italy	Limited to 799 units
Ferrari	F80 Aperta	2027	Roadster	Italy	
Ferrari	SP3JC	2018	Open-top Roadster	Italy	Two matching models designed by the Ferrari Styling Center
Ferrari	812 Superfast	2018–2024	Coupé	Italy	
Ferrari	812 GTS	2020–2024	Convertible	Italy	
Ferrari	Omologata	2021	Coupé	Italy	One-off model
Ferrari	SP51	2022	Open-top Roadster	Italy	One-off model, created by the Ferrari Styling Center
Ferrari	812 Competizione	2022-2023	Coupé	Italy	Limited to 999 units
Ferrari	812 Competizione A	2022-2023	Open-top Roadster	Italy	Limited to 599 units
Ferrari	12Cilindri	2025–present	Coupé, Convertible	Italy	
Fiat	124 Sport Spider	1966-1985	Roadster	Italy	
Fiat	124 Spider	2017–present	Roadster	Italy	
Fiat	850 Spider	1964-1973	Roadster	Italy	
Fiat	X1/9	1972–1982	Roadster	Italy	
Fiat	Barchetta	1995-2005	Roadster	Italy	
Fiat	8V	1952-1954	Coupè	Italy	
Ford	Thunderbird	1955-1997, 2002–2005	Convertible, Coupé	United States	
Ford	RS200	1984–1986	Coupé	United Kingdom	
Ford	Sierra RS500 Cosworth	1987-1992	Hatchback	Germany/United Kingdom	
Ford	Escort RS Cosworth	1992-1996	Hatchback	Germany/United Kingdom	
Ford	GT	2004–2006, 2017–2022	Coupé	United States	
Ford	GT Mk IV	2023-2025	Coupé	United States	Track-only supercar, limited to 67 units
Ford	GT90	1995	Coupé	United States	Concept car
Ford	GT40	1964-1969	Coupé	England/United States	Only 107 units produced
Ford	Mustang	1965–present	Coupé, Convertible	United States	
Ford	SVT Mustang Cobra/Cobra R	1993-2004	Coupé, Convertible	United States	
Ford	Mustang Dark Horse SC	2026	Coupé, Convertible	United States	Limited production
Ford	Mustang GTD	2025-present	Coupé	United States	Limited production
Ford	Shelby GT350R	2015–present	Coupé	United States	
Ford	Shelby GT500	1965–present	Coupé, Convertible	United States	
FV Frangivento	Charlotte	2017	Roadster	Italy	Concept car
FV Frangivento	Sorpasso GT3	2021	Coupé	Italy	Concept car
FV Frangivento	Asfane	2023	Coupé	Italy	Concept car
Frazer-Nash	Namir	2009	Coupé	Italy	Concept car designed by Giugiaro
Ferrante Design	DOSE Elytron	2017	Coupé	Italy	Concept hypercar designed by Fabio Ferrante for Le Mans
GAC	Aion Hyptec SSR	2023–present	Coupé	Coupé	China
Garagisti & Co	GP1	2026	Coupé	United Kingdom	Only 25 units will be built
Genty	Akylone	2016	Coupé	France	Limited to 25 cars
Giamaro	Katla	2025–present	Coupé	Italy	
Gillet	Vertigo	1992–present	Coupé	Belgium	
Ginetta	G4R	1964-1965	Coupé	United Kingdom	
Ginetta	G12	1966-1968	Coupé	United Kingdom	
Ginetta	G40R	2010–present	Coupé	United Kingdom	
Ginetta	G55	2011–present	Coupé	United Kingdom	Racecar
Ginetta	G60	2012-2015	Coupé	United Kingdom	
Ginetta	Akula	2019-	Coupé	United Kingdom	
Gordon Murray Automotive	T.50	2021	Limited production	United Kingdom	
Gordon Murray Automotive	T.50s Niki Lauda	2022	Limited production	United Kingdom	
Gordon Murray Automotive	T.33	2022–present	Limited to 100 units	United Kingdom	
Gordon Murray Automotive	T.33 Spider	2025	Convertible	United Kingdom	Limited Production
Gordon Murray Automotive	S1	2027	Coupé	United Kingdom	Limited to 64 units, built by Gordon Murray Special Vehicles (GMSV)
Gordon Murray Automotive	S1 LM	2026	Coupé	United Kingdom	Only five units built by Gordon Murray Special Vehicles (GMSV), a tribute to Murray's 1995 Le Mans victory
Gordon Murray Automotive	Le Mans GTR	2026	Coupé	United Kingdom	Only 24 units will be built by Gordon Murray Special Vehicles (GMSV)
Gumpert	Apollo Sport	2005-2012	Coupé	Germany	
Hennessey	Viper Venom 1000 Twin Turbo	2006-2015	Coupé, Roadster	United States	
Hennessey	Venom GT	2011-2017	Coupé, Roadster	United States	Limited to 13 units
Hennessey	Venom F5	2023-2025	Coupé, Roadster	United States	Limited to 24 units (Coupé) and 30 units (Roadster)
Hennessey	Venom F5 Revolution	2023-2025	Coupé, Roadster	United States	Track car, limited to 24 units (Coupé) and 12 units (Roadster)
Hennessey	Venom F5-M	2026	Roadster	United States	Limited to 12 units
Hennessey	Blackbird	2029	Coupé	United States	Limited to 71 units
Hispano-Suiza	Carmen	2019-2021	Coupé	Spain	
Hispano-Suiza	Carmen Boulogne	2022–present	Coupé	Spain	
Holden	Holden Commodore	1978-2017	Sedan	Australia	also sold as the Chevrolet SS
Holden	LX Torana SS	1977-1979	Sedan	Australia	the word Torana apparently means "to fly" in unidentified Australian Aboriginal language, it was based on the Vauxhall Viva
Holden	Holden Hurricane	1969	Coupé	Australia	The Holden Hurricane is a 1969 concept car built by Holden as a research vehicle to allow them "to study design trends, propulsion systems and other long range developments"
Holden	GTR-X	1970	Coupé	Australia	The GTR-X or the Torana GTR-X was a concept car that was Created by Holden, They were likely plans to realise it but only three were made and none of which made it to the public
Holden	Holden Monaro	2001-2006	Coupé	Australia	This model was sold under many other names such as the Pontiac GTO, the Vauxhall Monaro, the Chevy Lumina with the Holden Monaro being just one of them
Holden Special Vehicles	HSV ClubSport	1990-2017	Sedan	Australia	The Clubsport or nicknamed "Clubby" was sold as the Vauxhall VXR8
Holden Special Vehicles	HSV Maloo	1990-2017	Utility vehicle	Australia	Holden introduced the first generation of the HSV Maloo in 1990, it was based on the Holden Commodore utility
Holden Special Vehicles	HSV GTS	1992-2017	Sedan	The HSV GTS was the flagship model of Holden Special Vehicles, also sold as the Vauxhall VXR8	
Holden Special Vehicles	HSV W427	2008-2009	Sedan	The HSV W427 was a limited production vehicle made to celebrate HSV's 20th anniversary, it featured a 7.0-litre V8 from Corvette Z06	
Holden Special Vehicles	HSV Senator	1992-2017	Sedan	The HSV Grange was quite similar to the Senator in the sense that they were both performance luxury sedans and that they were discontinued when Holden ceased manufacturing.	
Holden Special Vehicles	HSV Grange	1996-2016	Sedan	The HSV Grange was quite similar to the Senator in the sense that they were both performance luxury sedans and that they were discontinued when Holden ceased manufacturing.	
Honda	CR-X	1985–1991	Coupé	Japan	
Honda	HSC	2003	Coupé	Japan	Concept car
Honda	Integra	1985-2006	lifeback Coupe	Japan	lifeback Coupe Only 1985–2006
Honda	NSX	1990–2005	Coupé, Targa	Japan	
Honda	NSX	2016–2022	Coupé	Japan	Also called Acura NSX in North America
Honda	NSX Type S	2021–2022	Coupé	Japan	Limited to 350 units
Honda	Prelude	1979-2001, 2026	Coupé	Japan	
Honda	S500	1963-1964	Roadster	Japan	
Honda	S600	1964-1966	Roadster, Coupé	Japan	
Honda	S660	2015–2023	Roadster	Japan	
Honda	S800	1966-1970	Roadster, Coupé	Japan	
Honda	S2000	1999-2009	Roadster, Coupé	Japan	
HTT	Pléthore LC-1300	2010–present	Coupé	Canada	
Hulme	F1	2011-2012	Roadster	New Zealand	Limited to 20 units
Hyundai	Tiburon	1996-2008	Coupé	South Korea	Also known as Hyundai Tuscani in Korean markets and Hyundai Coupe in European markets.
Hyundai	Genesis Coupé	2008–2016	Coupé	South Korea	Also available in a sedan
Hyundai	N Vision 74	2026	Coupé	South Korea	Electric and Hydrogen Fuel-cell Sports Car, limited to 200 units
Hyperion	XP-1	2022	Coupé	United States	Hydrogen fuel-cell supercar, limited to 300 units
Icona	Vulcano	2013–present	Coupé	China	Limited production
Icona	Vulcano Titanium	2016	Coupé	China	One-off model, the world's first ever Titanium car
Infiniti	G35/ G37S	2002-2013	Coupé, Convertible	Japan	
Infiniti	Q60	2013-2015, 2017–2022	Coupé, Convertible	Japan	
Isdera	Imperator 108i	1984-1993	Coupé	Germany	Limited to 30 units
Isdera	Commendatore 112i	1993	Coupé	Germany	One-off model
Iso	Grifo	1963-1974	Coupé	Italy	
Isuzu	117 Coupé	1968-1981	Coupé	Japan	Isuzu's first and only grand tourer/Sports Car
Italdesign	Zerouno	2017	Coupé	Italy	Limited to five units
Italdesign	Zerouno Duerta	2018	Roadster	Italy	Limited to five units
Italdesign	GT-R50	2020	Coupé	Italy	The Nissan GT-R and Italdesign are celebrating their 50th anniversaries by collaborating on GTR-50, limited to only 50 units will be produced
Jaguar	C-Type	1951–1953	Roadster	England	
Jaguar	D-Type	1954-1957	Roadster	England	
Jaguar	E-Type	1961-1975	Roadster, Coupé	England	
Jaguar	F-Type	2013-2024	Roadster, Coupé	England	
Jaguar	F-Type SVR	2016-2024	Roadster, Coupé	England	
Jaguar	F-Type Project 7	2016	Roadster	England	Limited to 250 units
Jaguar	SS 100	1936-1940	Roadster	England	
Jaguar	XK120	1948-1954	Roadster, Coupé	England	
Jaguar	XK140	1954-1957	Roadster, Coupé	England	
Jaguar	XK150	1957-1961	Roadster, Coupé	England	
Jaguar	XKSS	1957, 2016	Roadster	England	
Jaguar	XJ 13	1966	Coupé	England	A prototype racing car
Jaguar	XJ-S	1976-1996	Coupé, Targa, Convertible	England	
Jaguar	XJR-12	1990	Coupé	England	A sports-prototype race car
Jaguar	XJR-15	1990-1992	Coupé	England	Limited to 53 units
Jaguar	XJ 220	1992-1994	Coupé	England	Limited production
Jaguar	XK/ XK8/ XKR	1996-2015	Coupé, Convertible	England	
Jaguar	XKR-S/ XKR-S GT	2012-2015	Coupé, Convertible	England	
Jaguar	C-X75	2010-2015	Coupé	England	Concept Car
Jaguar	XFR-S	2012-2015	Sedan, Sportbrake	England	
Jaguar	XE SV Project 8	2017	Sedan	England	Limited production
JAS Motorsport	Tensei	2026	Coupé	Italy	Honda NSX restomod, only 35 units will be built, styled by Pininfarina
Jiotto	Caspita	1989-1990	Coupè	Japan	
K-1 Engineering	Attack	2002-2012	Roadster	Slovakia	
Karma	Kaveya		Coupé	United States	
Karma	Amaris GT	2026	Coupé	United States	
Keating	ZKR	2011	Coupé	United Kingdom	
Ken Okuyama Design	Kode57 Enji Speedster	2016	Open-top Roadster	Japan	Limited to five units only
Ken Okuyama Design	Kode0	2017	Coupé	Japan	One-off model
Ken Okuyama Design	Kode89	2026	Coupé	Japan	Limited to eight units
Kia	Stinger GT	2017–2023	Fastback, Sedan	South Korea	
Kimera	EVO37	2021	Coupé	Italy	
Kimera	EVO38	2025	Coupé	Italy	
Kimera	K-39 Stradale	2026	Coupé	Italy	Limited Production
Kimera	K-39 Pikes Peak Edition	2026	Coupé	Italy	
Koenigsegg	CC8S	2002-2004	Targa	Sweden	Limited to six units
Koenigsegg	CCR	2004-2010	Targa	Sweden	Limited production
Koenigsegg	CCX	2006-2011	Targa	Sweden	Limited production
Koenigsegg	CCXR Trevita	2009	Targa	Sweden	Limited to two units
Koenigsegg	CC850	2023	Targa	Sweden	Limited to 50 units
Koenigsegg	CCGT1	2027	Coupé	Sweden	Only 70 units will be made, developed as a tribute to the original CCGT race car
Koenigsegg	Agera	2011–2018	Targa	Sweden	
Koenigsegg	Agera R	2012–2018	Targa	Sweden	Limited production
Koenigsegg	Agera S	2013–2018	Targa	Sweden	Limited production
Koenigsegg	Agera RS	2015–2018	Targa	Sweden	Limited to 27 units
Koenigsegg	One:1	2014	Targa	Sweden	Limited to six units
Koenigsegg	Regera	2015–2022	Targa	Sweden	Limited to 80 units
Koenigsegg	Jesko	2021–present	Targa	Sweden	Limited to 125 units
Koenigsegg	Jesko Absolut	2022–present	Targa	Sweden	Limited production
Koenigsegg	Sadair's Spear	2026	Coupé	Sweden	Limited to 30 units
Koenigsegg	Gemera	2023–present	Coupé	Sweden	Limited to 300 units
KTM	X-Bow	2008–present	Roadster	Austria	
KTM	X-Bow GT4	2015–present	Coupé	Austria	Racecar
KTM	X-Bow GT-XR	2023	Coupé	Austria	Limited production
Lamborghini	350 GT/350 GTS	1964-1966	Coupé, Roadster	Italy	First production vehicle produced by Lamborghini and designed by Carrozzeria Touring
Lamborghini	3500 GTZ	1965	Coupé	Italy	Only two cars were built
Lamborghini	400 GT	1966-1968	Coupé	Italy	
Lamborghini	400 GT Monza	1966	Coupé	Italy	One-off model
Lamborghini	Islero	1968-1969	Coupé	Italy	
Lamborghini	Espada	1968-1978	Coupé	Italy	
Lamborghini	Jarama	1970-1976	Coupé	Italy	
Lamborghini	Miura	1966-1973	Roadster, Coupé	Italy	Limited to 763 units
Lamborghini	Miura SVR	1976	Coupé	Italy	One-off model, restored by Lamborghini Polo Storico
Lamborghini	Urraco	1973-1979	Coupé	Italy	
Lamborghini	Silhouette	1976-1979	Targa	Italy	
Lamborghini	Athon	1980	Roadster	Italy	Concept car designed by Bertone
Lamborghini	Countach	1974-1990	Coupé	Italy	
Lamborghini	Countach LPI 800-4	2022	Coupé	Italy	Limited to 112 units planned to be produced
Lamborghini	Jalpa	1981-1988	Roadster	Italy	
Lamborghini	Calà	1995	Targa	Italy	One-off concept car, designed by Italdesign Giugiaro
Lamborghini	Diablo VT	1990-2001	Roadster, Coupé	Italy	
Lamborghini	Diablo SE30/ SE30 Jota	1993	Coupé	Italy	Limited production special model to commemorate the company's 30th anniversary
Lamborghini	Diablo SV	1995-2001	Coupé	Italy	
Lamborghini	Diablo SV-R	1996	Coupé	Italy	Racecar
Lamborghini	Diablo GT/GTR	1998-2001	Coupé	Italy	Limited to 30 units (Diablo GTR) and 80 units (Diablo GT)
Lamborghini	Pregunta	1998	Roadster	Italy, France	One-off concept car based on Lamborghini Diablo, built by French Carrosserie Heuliez
Lamborghini	Murciélago	2002-2009	Roadster, Coupé	Italy	
Lamborghini	Murciélago LP670-4 SuperVeloce	2009	Coupé	Italy	Limited production
Lamborghini	Reventón	2006-2009	Roadster, Coupé	Italy	Limited to 35 units
Lamborghini	Gallardo	2003-2013	Roadster, Coupé	Italy	
Lamborghini	Gallardo LP570-4 Superleggera	2010-2013	Coupé	Italy	Limited production
Lamborghini	5-95 Zagato	2014	Coupé	Italy	One-off model
Lamborghini	Sesto Elemento	2011	Coupé	Italy	Limited to 20 units
Lamborghini	Huracán LP610-4	2015–2019	Roadster, Coupé	Italy	
Lamborghini	Huracán Performante	2017–2019	Roadster, Coupé	Italy	Limited production
Lamborghini	Huracán GT3/ GT3 EVO	2015	Coupé	Italy	Racecar
Lamborghini	Huracán EVO	2019-2024	Roadster, Coupé	Italy	
Lamborghini	Huracán Super Trofeo EVO2	2021	Coupé	Italy	Racecar
Lamborghini	Huracán STO	2021–2024	Coupé	Italy	Limited production, track-focused supercar
Lamborghini	Huracán Tecnica	2022-2024	Coupé	Italy	Limited production
Lamborghini	Huracán Sterrato	2023–present	Coupé	Italy	All-Terrain super sports car, limited production
Lamborghini	Huracán STJ	2024	Coupé	Italy	Final V10 supercar, limited to 10 units
Lamborghini	Temerario	2025	Coupé	Italy	
Lamborghini	Temerario GT3	2026	Coupé	Italy	Racecar
Lamborghini	Temerario Super Trofeo	2027	Coupé	Italy	Racecar
Lamborghini	Estoque	2008	4-door Sports Sedan	Italy	Concept car
Lamborghini	Egoista	2013	Coupé	Italy	One-off concept car, to celebrate the company's 50th anniversary
Lamborghini	Aventador LP700-4	2011–2017	Roadster, Coupé	Italy	
Lamborghini	Aventador J	2012	Open-top Roadster	Italy	One-off model
Lamborghini	Aventador LP750-4 SuperVeloce	2015–2017	Roadster, Coupé	Italy	Limited production
Lamborghini	Veneno	2013-2014	Roadster, Coupé	Italy	One of the most expensive production cars in the world, limited to 9 units (Roadster) and 5 units (Coupé)
Lamborghini	Asterion LPI 910-4	2014	Coupé	Italy	Concept car
Lamborghini	Aventador S	2017–2021	Roadster, Coupé	Italy	
Lamborghini	Aventador SVJ	2019-2021	Roadster, Coupé	Italy	Limited production
Lamborghini	Aventador LP780-4 Ultimae	2021-2022	Roadster, Coupé	Italy	Limited production, a celebration of the iconic V12 super sports car and combustion engine in a final production model
Lamborghini	SC18 Alston	2018	Coupé	Italy	One-off model, custom-built by Lamborghini's Racing division Squadra Corse
Lamborghini	Essenza SCV12	2020	Coupé	Italy	Limited to 40 units, track-only sports car developed by Lamborghini's Racing division Squadra Corse
Lamborghini	Centenario	2016-2018	Roadster, Coupé	Italy	Limited production
Lamborghini	Sián FKP 37	2020-2021	Roadster, Coupé	Italy	Lamborghini's first hybrid sports car limited to 63 units (Coupé) and 19 units (Roadster)
Lamborghini	SC20	2021	Open-top Roadster	Italy	One-off model, custom-built by Lamborghini's Racing division Squadra Corse
Lamborghini	Invencible	2023	Coupé	Italy	One-off model, to mark end of pure V-12 era
Lamborghini	Autentica	2023	Roadster	Italy	One-off model, to mark end of pure V-12 era
Lamborghini	Revuelto	2024–Present	Coupé	Italy	Lamborghini's first V12 hybrid plug-in HPEV (High Performance Electrified Vehicle)
Lamborghini	Revuelto SV	2027	Coupé	Italy	Limited to 1,963 units
Lamborghini	Fenomeno	2026	Coupé	Italy	Limited to 29 units
Lamborghini	Fenomeno Roadster	2027	Roadster	Italy	Limited to 15 units
Lamborghini	SC63	2024	Coupé	Italy	LMDh Racecar
Lancia	Stratos	1973-1978		Italy	
Lancia	Sibilo	1978	A concept car based on the production Lancia Stratos	Italy	
Lancia	Lancia Montecarlo	1975-1978 and 1980–1981		Italy	
Laraki	Fulgura	2004-2005	Coupé	Morocco	Limited production
Laraki	Borac	2005	Coupé	Morocco	Concept car
Laraki	Epitome	2013	Coupé	Morocco	Concept car
Lanzante	95-59	2025	Coupé	England	Limited to 59 units
Leblanc	Caroline GTR	1999-2005	Coupé	Switzerland	Limited production
Leblanc	Mirabeau	2005	Speedster	Switzerland	Limited production
Lexus	IS F	2006-2008	Sports Sedan	Japan	Limited production
Lexus	IS 500 F Sport Performance	2021–present	Sports Sedan	Japan	Limited production
Lexus	LC 500	2016–2026	Coupé, Convertible	Japan	
Lexus	LFA	2011-2012	Coupé	Japan	Limited to 500 units
Lexus	LFA Nürburgring Edition	2011-2012	Coupé	Japan	Limited to 64 units
Lexus	LFA EV	2027	Coupé	Japan	
Lexus	RC F	2014–2025	Coupé	Japan	
Lexus	RC F Track Edition	2020-2025	Coupé	Japan	Limited production
Lexus	SC	1991-2005	Coupe, convertible	Japan	Also Called "Toyota Soarer" Since 1991–2005
Lightning	GT	2007	Coupé	United Kingdom	
Lobini	H1	2005-2013	Coupè	Brazil	
Lotec	C1000	1995	Coupé	Germany	One-off model
Lotec	Sirius	2002-2005	Coupé	Germany	Limited production
Lotus	Elite	1958-1963, 1974–1982	Coupé, Shooting Brake	United Kingdom	
Lotus	Eclat	1975-1982	Coupé	United Kingdom	
Lotus	Elan M100	1990-1995	Roadster	United Kingdom	
Lotus	Emotion	1991	Coupe	United Kingdom	Concept car designed by Bertone
Lotus	Elise	1994–present	Roadster	United Kingdom	
Lotus	Elise GT1	1997	Coupé, Racecar	United Kingdom	Limited production
Lotus	Esprit	1976–2004	Coupé	United Kingdom	
Lotus	340R	1999-2001	Roadster	United Kingdom	Limited production
Lotus	M250	2000	Coupé	United Kingdom	Concept car
Lotus	Exige	2000–2021	Roadster	United Kingdom	
Lotus	Evora	2009–2021	Coupé	United Kingdom	
Lotus	2-Eleven	2007-2011	Coupé	United Kingdom	
Lotus	3-Eleven	2015-2021	Speedster	United Kingdom	
Lotus	Europa	1966–1975	Coupé	United Kingdom	
Lotus	Evija	2020–present	Coupé	United Kingdom	The first British all-electric hypercar codenamed "Type 130", limited to 130 units
Lotus	Emira	2022–present	Coupé	United Kingdom	
Lotus	Emira GT4	2022	Coupé	United Kingdom	Track car
Lucid	Air Sapphire	2023–present	Electric sports sedan	United States	Limited Production
Lucra	LC470	2013-	Convertible	United States	
Maggiore	GranTurismO	2023	Coupé	Italy	Planned to build 19 units, based on Ferrari 308 GTB
Marc Philipp Gemballa	Marsien GT	2026	Coupé	Germany	Limited to 30 units
Marcos	GT	1964-1972, 1981–1990	Coupé	England	
Marcos	Mantara	1992-1997	Coupé, Roadster	England	
Marcos	Mantis	1968-1971, 1997–1998	Coupé, Roadster	England	
Marcos	TSO GT2	2004-2007	Coupé	England	
Maserati	A6GCS "Monofaro"	1947-1952	Spyder	Italy	
Maserati	A6G 2000 Pinin Farina	1950-1951	Coupé	Italy	
Maserati	A6GCS Berlinetta	1953-1955	Coupé	Italy	
Maserati	A6G/54 Zagato	1954-1956	Coupé	Italy	
Maserati	A6G/54 GranSport Frua Spyder	1954-1956	Spyder	Italy	
Maserati	300S	1955-1958	Convertible	Italy	Racecar
Maserati	Tipo 60/61	1959-1961	Spyder	Italy	Also called "Maserati Birdcage"
Maserati	3500 GT	1957-1964	Coupé, Spyder	Italy	
Maserati	Sebring	1962-1968	Coupé	Italy	
Maserati	5000 GT	1959-1966	Coupé	Italy	Only 34 units were produced
Maserati	Mistral	1963-1970	Coupé, Spyder	Italy	
Maserati	Bora	1971-1978	Coupé	Italy	
Maserati	Ghibli	1967-1973, 1992–1998, 2013–2024	Coupé, Spyder, Sedan	Italy	
Maserati	Indy	1969-1975	Coupé	Italy	
Maserati	Khamsin	1974-1982	Coupé	Italy	
Maserati	Merak	1972-1983	Coupé	Italy	
Maserati	Shamal	1989-1996	Coupé	Italy	
Maserati	3200 GT	1998-2002	Coupé	Italy	
Maserati	GranSport	2004-2007	Roadster, Coupé	Italy	
Maserati	MC12	2004-2005	Coupé, Targa	Italy	Limited production
Maserati	Birdcage 75th	2005	Coupé	Italy	Concept car
Maserati	MC20	2021-2025	Coupé	Italy	Facelifted and renamed as Maserati MCPura in 2026
Maserati	MC20 Cielo	2023-2025	Convertible	Italy	Facelifted and renamed as Maserati MCPura Cielo in 2026
Maserati	GT2	2024	Coupé	Italy	Race car
Maserati	GT2 Stradale	2025	Coupé	Italy	
Maserati	MCXtrema	2024	Coupé	Italy	Track car only, limited to 62 units
Maserati	GranTurismo	2007-2019, 2023	Coupé	Italy	
Maserati	GranCabrio	2010-2019, 2024	Cabriolet	Italy	
Maserati	GranTurismo Folgore	2023	Coupé	Italy	All-electric version of Maserati's GT
Maserati	GranCabrio Folgore	2024	Cabriolet	Italy	All-electric version of Maserati's GT
Mastretta	MXT	2011-2014	Coupé	Mexico	
Marussia	B1/B2	2009-2014	Coupé	Russia	
Manifattura Automobili Torino (MAT)	New Stratos	2020	Coupé	Italy	Limited production
Matra	Djet	1965-1967	Coupé	France	
Maxton	Rollerskate	1992-1994	Roadster	United States	Rotary engine, 50 or 51 built
Mazda	Cosmo	1967-1996	Coupé	Japan	
Mazda	MX-3	1992-1998	Coupé	Japan	Also called "Eunos 30X"
Mazda	MX-5	1989–present	Roadster	Japan	
Mazda	MX-5 RF	2016–present	Targa, Fastback	Japan	
Mazda	MX-6	1988-1997	Coupé	Japan	
Mazda	RX-7	1978-2002	Roadster, Coupé	Japan	
Mazda	RX-8	2003-2012	Coupé	Japan	
Mazda	RX-500	1970	Coupé	Japan	Concept car
Mazzanti	Evantra	2013–present	Coupé	Italy	
McLaren	F1	1992-1997	Coupé	United Kingdom	
McLaren	F1 LM	1995	Coupé	United Kingdom	Limited production
McLaren	F1 GTR	1995-1997 (all versions)	Coupé, Racecar	United Kingdom	Limited production
McLaren	MP4-12C GT3	2010	Racecar	United Kingdom	
McLaren	12C	2011–2014	Coupé, Convertible	United Kingdom	
McLaren	X-1	2012	Coupé	United Kingdom	One-off model built by McLaren Special Operations (MSO)
McLaren	650S	2014-2016	Coupé, Convertible	United Kingdom	Similar as McLaren 625C
McLaren	650S Can-Am	2015-2016	Convertible	United Kingdom	Limited to 50 units
McLaren	650S GT3	2015	Racecar	United Kingdom	
McLaren	MSO HS	2016	Coupé	United Kingdom	Limited production
McLaren	675LT	2016-2017	Coupé, Convertible	United Kingdom	
McLaren	MSO R	2016-2017	Coupé, Convertible	United Kingdom	Limited production
McLaren	570S	2016–2021	Coupé, Convertible	United Kingdom	Similar as McLaren 540C
McLaren	570GT	2016–2019	Coupé	United Kingdom	
McLaren	570S GT4	2016	Coupé	United Kingdom	Track car only
McLaren	570S Sprint	2016	Coupé	United Kingdom	Track car only
McLaren	MSO X	2018	Coupé	United Kingdom	Limited to 10 units
McLaren	600LT	2018–2021	Coupé, Convertible	United Kingdom	
McLaren	620R	2020-2021	Coupé	United Kingdom	Limited to 225 units
McLaren	P1/ P1 GTR	2013-2017	Supercar, Racecar	United Kingdom	Limited production
McLaren	P1 LM	2016-2017	Supercar	United Kingdom	Limited production
McLaren	P1 Spider by Lanzante	2022	Convertible	United Kingdom	Limited to five units
McLaren	720S	2017–2022	Coupé, Convertible	United Kingdom	
McLaren	720S GT3	2019	Coupé	United Kingdom	Racecar
McLaren	720S Le Mans	2020-2022	Coupé	United Kingdom	Limited to 50 units, to marks McLaren's win at the famous 24-hour Le Mans race in 1995
McLaren	765LT	2020-2022	Coupé, Convertible	United Kingdom	
McLaren	750S	2024	Coupé, Convertible	United Kingdom	
McLaren	750S Le Mans	2025	Coupé	United Kingdom	Limited to 50 units
McLaren	788HS	2027	Coupé, Convertible	United Kingdom	Track-focused supercar, limited to 100 units (Coupé) and 100 units (Spider)
McLaren	W1	2025	Coupé	United Kingdom	Limited to 399 units
McLaren	McL 6GT	2028	Coupé	United Kingdom	The McL 6GT is a car made to honor the legacy Bruce McLaren by realising a mordenized version of the M6GT, what was planned to be McLaren's first production vehicle
McLaren	Senna	2018–2019	Coupé	United Kingdom	Limited to 500 units
McLaren	Senna GTR	2019	Coupé	United Kingdom	Track car only, limited to 75 units
McLaren	Senna GTR LM	2020	Coupé	United Kingdom	Track car only, limited to five units
McLaren	Senna Le Mans	2020	Coupé	United Kingdom	Limited to 20 units
McLaren	Sabre by MSO	2021	Coupé	United Kingdom	Limited to 15 units, which is exclusive to US market
McLaren	Speedtail	2020-	Coupé	United Kingdom	Limited to 106 units
McLaren	GT	2019-2023	Coupé	United Kingdom	
McLaren	GTS	2024	Coupé	United Kingdom	
McLaren	Elva	2020	Open-top Speedster	United Kingdom	Limited to 149 units
McLaren	Artura	2021–present	Coupé	United Kingdom	First twin-turbo V6 hybrid supercar
McLaren	Artura Spider	2024	Convertible	United Kingdom	
McLaren	Artura GT4	2022	Coupé	United Kingdom	Track car
McLaren	Solus GT	2023	Coupé	United Kingdom	Track car only, limited to 25 units
Mega	Monte Carlo	1996-1999	Coupé	France	
Melkus	RS 1000	1969-1979	Coupé	Germany	
Mercedes-AMG	C63/C63 S (W205)	2016–2023	Coupé, Cabriolet, Sedan, Touring	Germany	
Mercedes-AMG	CLE 53/ 63	2024-present	Coupé, Cabriolet	Germany	
Mercedes-AMG	CLE 63 Mythos	2027	Coupé	Germany	Limited Production
Mercedes-AMG	CLS 53	2018–2023	4-door Coupé	Germany	
Mercedes-AMG	E53 (W213)	2018–2023	Sedan, Cabriolet, Coupé	Germany	
Mercedes-AMG	E43/E63/E63 S (W213)	2017–2023	Sedan, Touring	Germany	
Mercedes-AMG	GT2 Edition W16	2025	Coupé	Germany	Track-focused hypercar, limited to 30 units
Mercedes-AMG	AMG GT3	2015-2019, 2027	Coupé	Germany	Racecar
Mercedes-AMG	GT3 Edition 55	2022	Coupé	Germany	Limited to five units
Mercedes-AMG	GT/GT C	2016–2022	Roadster, Coupé	Germany	
Mercedes-AMG	GT S	2015–2020	Roadster, Coupé	Germany	
Mercedes-AMG	GT R	2017–2021	Roadster, Coupé	Germany	
Mercedes-AMG	GT R Pro	2019-2022	Coupé	Germany	Limited production
Mercedes-AMG	GT Black Series	2021–2023, 2027	Coupé	Germany	Limited production
Mercedes-AMG	GT 4-door Coupé	2018–2025	4-door Coupé	Germany	
Mercedes-AMG	GT 4-door Coupé (C590)	2026	4-door Coupé	Germany	
Mercedes-AMG	GT (C192)	2024–present	Coupé	Germany	
Mercedes-AMG	SL (R232)	2022–present	Roadster	Germany	
Mercedes-AMG	PureSpeed	2025	Open-top Roadster	Germany	Limited to 250 units
Mercedes-AMG	AMG One	2022–present	Coupé	Germany	Limited to 275 units
Mercedes-AMG	S 63/ S 65	2013–2020	Coupé, Cabriolet, Sedan	Germany	
Mercedes-Benz	C111/II	1969-1970	Coupé	Germany	Concept car
Mercedes-Benz	C112	1991	Coupé	Germany	Concept car
Mercedes-Benz	190E 2.5-16 Evolution II	1990-1991	Sports Sedan	Germany	Limited Production
Mercedes-Benz	500e	1991-1995	Sports Sedan	Germany	A high-performance version of the W124 that was Created by Mercedes in close cooperation with Porsche
Mercedes-Benz	C63 (W204)	2008-2014	Sedan, Touring	Germany	
Mercedes-Benz	C63 AMG Coupe Black Series	2012-2013	Coupé	Germany	Limited production
Mercedes-Benz	CL	1992-2014	Coupé	Germany	
Mercedes-Benz	CLK	1997–2009	Coupé, Cabriolet	Germany	
Mercedes-Benz	CLK63 AMG Black Series	2007–2009	Coupé	Germany	Limited production
Mercedes-Benz	CLK DTM AMG	2004-2006	Coupé, Cabriolet	Germany	Limited to 180 units
Mercedes-Benz	CLK-GTR	1997-2002	Roadster, Coupé	Germany	Limited production
Mercedes-Benz	CLE	2023	Coupé, Cabriolet	Germany	
Mercedes-Benz	300 SL (W198)	1954–1963	Roadster, Coupé	Germany	"Gullwing" doors
Mercedes-Benz	230/250/280 SL (W113)	1963-1971	Roadster, Coupé	Germany	
Mercedes-Benz	SL (R107/C107)	1972-1989	Roadster, Coupé	Germany	
Mercedes-Benz	SL (R129)	1989-2002	Roadster, Coupé	Germany	
Mercedes-Benz	SL73 AMG (R129)	1995-1996	Roadster	Germany	Limited production
Mercedes-Benz	SL (R230/R231)	2002-2019	Roadster	Germany	
Mercedes-Benz	SL65 AMG Black Series	2008-2011	Coupé	Germany	Limited to 350 units
Mercedes-Benz	SLK	1996-2004, 2004–2010, 2011–2015	Roadster	Germany	
Mercedes-Benz	SLK55 AMG Black Series	2006-2008	Roadster	Germany	Limited to 100 units
Mercedes-Benz	SLC	2016-2019	Roadster	Germany	
Mercedes-Benz	SLR McLaren	2003-2010	Coupé, Roadster	Germany	
Mercedes-Benz	SLR McLaren 722 S	2006-2010	Coupé, Roadster	Germany	Limited production
Mercedes-Benz	SLR Stirling Moss	2009	Speedster	Germany	Limited to 75
Mercedes-Benz	SLS AMG	2011-2015	Coupé, Roadster	Germany	
Mercedes-Benz	SLS AMG GT3	2011-2015	Coupé	Germany	Racecar
Mercedes-Benz	SLS AMG Black Series	2014-2015	Coupé	Germany	
Mercedes-Maybach	Exelero	2005	Coupé	Germany	One-off Concept car
Mercedes-Maybach	Maybach 6	2018	Coupé, Cabriolet	Germany	Concept car
MG	14/28	1924-1927	Roadster	England	
MG	14/40	1927-1929	Roadster	England	
MG	C-type	1931-1932	Roadster	England	
MG	D-type	1931-1932	Roadster	England	
MG	MGF	1995-2002	Roadster	England	
MG	F-type	1931-1932	Roadster	England	
MG	J1, J2, J3, J4	1932-1934	Roadster	England	
MG	K-type	1932-1934	Roadster	England	
MG	L-type	1933-1934	Roadster	England	
MG	M-type	1929-1932	Roadster	England	
MG	N-type	1934-1936	Roadster	England	
MG	MGA	1955-1962	Roadster, Coupé	England	
MG	MGB	1962-1980	Roadster, GT Fastback Coupé	England	
MG	MGC	1962-1980	Roadster	England	
MG	Midget	1961-1979	Roadster	England	
MG	PA	1934-1936	Roadster	England	
MG	PB	1935-1936	Roadster	England	
MG	TA	1936-1939	Roadster	England	
MG	TB	1939-1940	Roadster	England	
MG	TC	1945-1950	Roadster	England	
MG	TD	1950-1953	Roadster	England	
MG	TF	1953-1955	Roadster	England	
MG	TF (2002)	2002-2005, 2007–2011	Roadster	England	
MG	XPower SV-R	2003-2005	Coupé	United Kingdom/ Italy	
MG	Cyberster	2024	Roadster	China/ United Kingdom	
Mitsubishi	Starion	1983-1989	Coupé	Japan	
Mitsubishi	Eclipse	1989-2012	Coupé, Convertible	Japan	
Mitsubishi	GTO	1990-2000	Coupé	Japan	Also called "Mitsubishi 3000 GT"
Mitsubishi	FTO	1994-2000	Coupé	Japan	
Mitsubishi	Lancer Evolution	1992-2016	Sedan, Station wagon	Japan	Also Compact Sports
Mitsuoka	Orochi	2006-2014	Coupé	Japan	
Mitsuoka	Himiko	2008–present	Roadster	Japan	
Mitsuoka	Rock Star	2018–present	Roadster	Japan	Limited to 50 units
Monte Carlo	GTB Centenaire	1990-1992	Coupe	Monaco	
Monteverdi	Hai 450 SS Prototype	1970, 1973	Coupé	Switzerland	Limited to two units
Monteverdi	Hai 650 F1 Prototype	1992	Supercar	Switzerland	Limited to three units
Morgan	Plus 4	1950-1969	Roadster	England	
Morgan	Aero 8	2001-2010, 2015–present	Roadster	England	
Morgan	Aeromax	2008-2009	Coupe	England	Limited production
Morgan	Roadster	2004–present	Roadster	England	Available as a 2-seater or a 4-seater
Morgan	Plus 8	1968-2004, 2012–present	Roadster	England	
Morgan	Plus 8 GTR	2022	Coupé	England	Limited to Nine units
Morgan	Aero Supersports	2010-2015	Targa	England	
Morgan	Aero Coupé	2012-2015	Coupé	England	
Morgan	3 Wheeler/ EV3	2012–present	Roadster	England	
Morgan	Aero GT	2018–present	Coupé	England	
Morgan	Plus Six	2019–2025	Roadster	England	
Morgan	Plus Four	2020–present	Roadster	England	
Morgan	Supersport	2025-present	Roadster	England	
Morgan	Midsummer	2024-present	Roadster, Coupé	England	Limited to 50 units (Roadster) and nine units (Coupé), designed by Pininfarina
Mosler	MT900S	2001-2011	Coupé	United Kingdom/ United States	
MTX Tatra	V8	1991	Coupé	Czech Republic	
Nio	EP9	2016–present	Coupé	China/United Kingdom	Electric sports car
Nilu27	V12	2025	Coupé		Limited production, a new brand created by ex-chief designer of Koenigsegg - Sasha Selipanov
Nissan	Datsun Roadster/Road Star	1932-1941	Roadster, Coupé	Japan	
Nissan	Datsun DC-3	1952	Roadster	Japan	
Nissan	Datsun Sports 1000	1959-1960	Roadster	Japan	
Nissan	Datsun Fairlady/Sports 1200	1960-1962	Roadster	Japan	engine change
Nissan	Datsun Fairlady/Sports 1500	1963-1965	Roadster	Japan	
Nissan	Datsun Fairlady/Sports 1600	1965-1970	Roadster	Japan	
Nissan	Datsun Fairlady/Sports 2000	1967-1970	Roadster	Japan	
Nissan	Fairlady Z/Datsun 240Z	1970-1973	Coupé	Japan	
Nissan	Fairlady Z/Datsun 260Z	1974-1978	Coupé and 2+2	Japan	
Nissan	Fairlady Z/Datsun 280Z	1975-1978	Coupé and 2+2	Japan	North America only
Nissan	Fairlady Z/Datsun 280ZX	1978-1983	Coupé and 2+2	Japan	North America and Australia only
Nissan	180SX	1989-1998	Coupé	Japan	
Nissan	240SX	1989-1998	Coupé	Japan	
Nissan	NISMO 270R	1994-1995	Coupé	Japan	Limited to 30 units
Nissan	Silvia	1965-1968, 1975–2002	Coupé	Japan	
Nissan	Fairlady Z/300ZX	1984-1996	Coupé	Japan	
Nissan	Fairlady Z/350Z	2003-2008	Roadster, Coupé	Japan	
Nissan	Fairlady Z/370Z	2009–2020	Roadster, Coupé	Japan	
Nissan	Z	2022–present	Coupé	Japan	
Nissan	Skyline 250GT	2001- 2010	Sedan	Japan	
Nissan	Skyline 350GT	2001- 2017	Coupe	Japan	
Nissan	Skyline Nissmo	2023	Coupe	Japan	
Nissan	RS	1983-1984	Coupe	Japan	Nicknamed the "Iron Mask"
Nissan	Figaro	1991	Roadster	Japan	
Nissan	Leopard	1980-1992	Coupe	Japan	only F30 Coupe And F31 Only is Sport car
Nissan	NX	1990-1996	Coupe, Targa Top	Japan	
Nissan	R390 GT1	1997-1999	Racecar	Japan	
Nissan	Skyline	1968-2014	Coupe	Japan	Only Coupe Body Style
Nissan	Skyline GT-R	1969–1973, 1989–2002	Coupé	Japan	
Nissan	NISMO 400R (R33)	1995-1998	Coupé	Japan	Only 44 units to be produced
Nissan	GT-R	2007–2025	Coupé	Japan	
Nissan	GT-R NISMO	2014–2025	Coupé	Japan	
Noble	M10	1999-2000	Convertible	England	
Noble	M12	2000	Coupé	South Africa	
Noble	M15	2006-2011	Coupé	England	
Noble	M400	2004-2007	Coupé	England	
Noble	M500	2022–present	Coupé	England	
Noble	M600	2010–present	Coupé, Speedster	England	
Oilstainlab	HF-11	2025	Coupé	United States	Limited to 25 units
Opel	Calibra	1989-1997	Coupé	Germany	
Opel	CD	1969	Coupé	Germany	Concept car
Opel	GT	1968-1973, 2007–2010	Coupé, Roadster	Germany	
Opel	Manta	1970-1988	Coupé	Germany	
Opel	Speedster	2001-2005	Roadster	Germany	Also called "Vauxhall VX220" in United Kingdom
Opel	Astra OPC	2005-2010	Coupé	Germany	Also called "Vauxhall Astra VXR" in United Kingdom
Opel	Cascada	2013-2019	Convertible	Germany	Also called "Vauxhall Cascada" (UK), "Buick Cascada" or "Holden Cascada"
Orca	113 Series	2004-2007	Coupé, Roadster	Liechtenstein	
Orca	SC7	2005	Coupé	Liechtenstein	Limited to seven units
One One Lab	Project Xeno	2026	Barchetta	Italy	
Oullim	Spirra	2008-2017	Coupé	South Korea	
Pagani	Alisea	2024	Coupé	Italy	Concept car
Pagani	Huayra	2012–2020	Coupé, Roadster	Italy	Limited to 100 units (Coupé) and 100 units (Roadster)
Pagani	Huayra BC	2016–2022	Coupé, Roadster	Italy	Limited to 20 units (Coupé) and 40 units (Roadster)
Pagani	Huayra Tricolore	2020–2022	Roadster	Italy	Limited to three units
Pagani	Huayra R	2021–present	Coupé	Italy	Track car only, limited to 30 units
Pagani	Huayra R Evo	2024	Targa	Italy	Track car only, limited production
Pagani	Imola	2020–present	Coupé, Roadster	Italy	Limited to five units (Coupé) and eight units (Roadster)
Pagani	Huayra Codalunga	2022	Coupé	Italy	Limited to five units
Pagani	Huayra Codalunga Speedster	2026	Roadster	Italy	Limited to 10 units
Pagani	Utopia	2023–present	Coupé, Roadster	Italy	Limited to 99 units (Coupé) and 130 units (Roadster)
Pagani	Zonda	1999-2017	Coupé, Roadster	Italy	
Pagani	Zonda F	2005-2017	Coupé, Roadster	Italy	Limited to 25 units (Coupé) and 25 units (Roadster)
Pagani	Zonda R	2008-2009	Racecar	Italy	Track car only, limited to 15 units
Pagani	Zonda Cinque	2009-2010	Coupé, Roadster	Italy	Limited to five units (Coupé) and five units (Roadster)
Pagani	Zonda Revolución	2014	Racecar	Italy	Final edition of Pagani Zonda R
Pagani	Zonda Tricolore	2010	Coupé	Italy	One-off model, to celebrate the 50th Anniversary of Frecce Tricolori, Italy's aerobatic team.
Pagani	Zonda HP Barchetta	2017	Speedster	Italy	Limited to three units
Pambuffetti	PJ-01	2021	Coupe	Italy	
Panoz	Roadster	1992-1995, 1996–1999	Roadster	United States	Derived from the TMC Costin
Panoz	Esperante	2000-2007	Roadster, Coupé	United States	
Panoz	Abruzzi	2010-2013	Coupé	United States	Limited to 81 units
Panoz	Avezzano	2017	Coupé	United States	
Panther	Solo	1989-1990	Coupé	England	
Peugeot	907	2004	Coupé	France	Concept car
Peugeot	RC Z	2009-2015	Coupé	France	
Peugeot	308 GTi	2015–2021	Hatchback	France	
Peugeot	208 GTi	2014–2019	Hatchback	France	
Peugeot	Onyx	2012	Coupé	France	Concept car
Peugeot	Oxia	1988	Coupé	France	Concept car
Peugeot	e-Legend	2018	Coupé	France	Concept car
Picasso	PS-01	2021	Coupè	Switzerland	
Piëch	Mark Zero	2019	Coupé	Switzerland	Concept car
Pininfarina	H2 Speed	2017	Hydrogen-powered Racecar	Italy	Concept car
Pininfarina	Fittipaldi EF7	2017	Coupé	Italy	Concept car, only 39 units planned to produce
Pininfarina	Battista	2021–present	Coupé	Italy	Electric hypercar, limited to 150 units
Pininfarina	Battista Targamerica	2025	Targa	Italy	One-off model
Pininfarina	B95	2025	Open-top Speedster	Italy	Electric hyper Barchetta, limited to 10 units
Plymouth	Barracuda	1964-1974	Fastback, Coupé, Convertible	United States	Source car for original Dodge Challenger
Plymouth	GTX	1968-1971	Coupé, Convertible	United States	
Plymouth	Road Runner	1968-1974	Coupé, Convertible	United States	Includes 1970 Plymouth Superbird
Polestar	1	2019-2022	Coupé	Sweden	
Polestar	02	2022	Electric convertible	Sweden	Concept car
Polestar	Synergy	2023	Coupé	Sweden	Concept car
Polestar	6	2026	Electric convertible	Sweden	
Pontiac	Fiero	1984-1988	Coupé	United States	
Pontiac	Firebird	1967–2002	Coupé, Convertible	United States	Also known as the Pontiac Trans Am
Pontiac	GTO	1964–1974, 2004–2006	Coupe	United States, Australia	Also known as the Holden Monaro
Pontiac	Solstice	2006–2010	Roadster, Coupé	United States	
Pontiac	Solstice GXP	2006–2010	Roadster, Coupé	United States	More powerful version of base Solstice
Porsche	356	1948–1965	Roadster, Coupé	Germany	
Porsche	356 B Carrera GTL Abarth	1960-1961	Coupé	Germany	
Porsche	550	1953-1956	Spyder, Coupé	Germany	
Porsche	718	1957	Roadster, Coupé	Germany	
Porsche	904	1964-1965	Coupé	Germany	Also known as the Carrera GTS
Porsche	912	1965 – 1969	Targa, Coupé	Germany	
Porsche	914	1969–1976	Targa	Germany	
Porsche	917 K	1970–1971	Coupé	Germany	Racing car, limited to 12 units
Porsche	924	1976–1988	Coupé	Germany	
Porsche	928	1977–1995	Coupé	Germany	
Porsche	930	1975-1989	Coupé, Cabriolet	Germany	Also known as Porsche 911 Turbo
Porsche	935	1976-1981, 2019	Coupé	Germany	Racing car, limited production
Porsche	944	1982–1991	Coupé, Cabriolet	Germany	
Porsche	959	1986-1988, 1992–1993	Coupé	Germany	Porsche 959 S is only 29 units to be built
Porsche	964	1989–1994	Coupé, Cabriolet, Targa	Germany	Also known as Porsche 911
Porsche	968	1992–1995	Coupé, Cabriolet	Germany	Successor to Porsche 944
Porsche	993	1993–1998	Coupé, Cabriolet, Targa	Germany	Also known as Porsche 911
Porsche	Carrera RS	1995-1996	Coupé	Germany	
Porsche	911 Speedster	1995-1996	Cabriolet	Germany	Limited production
Porsche	Schuppan 962CR	1992-1994	Coupé	Germany	Limited to six units, built from Australian racecar driver Vern Schuppan
Porsche	911 GT1	1996-1998	Coupé	Germany	Racecar
Porsche	919 Hybrid/ Evo	2014–2018	Coupé	Germany	Racecar
Porsche	963	2023–Present	Coupé	Germany	LMDh Racecar
Porsche	963 RSP	2025	Coupé	Germany	One-off model, road legal Le Mans Prototype
Porsche	911 GT3 R	2016–present	Coupé	Germany	Racecar
Porsche	996	1997-2004	Coupé, Cabriolet, Targa	Germany	Also known as Porsche 911
Porsche	997	2004–2012	Coupé, Cabriolet, Targa	Germany	German, also known as Porsche 911
Porsche	911 Speedster	2011–2012	Cabriolet	Germany	Limited production
Porsche	911 Sport Classic	2007-2010	Coupé	Germany	Limited to 250 units
Porsche	991	2013–2019	Coupé, Cabriolet, Targa	Germany	Also known as Porsche 911
Porsche	911 Carrera T	2018–2019	Coupé	Germany	
Porsche	911 GT3 Touring Package	2018–2019	Coupé	Germany	
Porsche	911 R	2016	Coupé	Germany	Limited production
Porsche	911 Turbo S Exclusive Series	2018–2019	Coupé, Cabriolet	Germany	Limited production
Porsche	911 GT2 RS Clubsport	2018–2019	Coupé	Germany	Racecar
Porsche	911 Speedster	2019	Cabriolet	Germany	Limited production
Porsche	911 GT2 Flachbau RS	2026	Coupé	Germany	One-off model
Porsche	992	2019–present	Coupé, Cabriolet, Targa	Germany	Also known as Porsche 911
Porsche	911 Dakar	2023–present	Coupé	Germany	
Porsche	911 S/T	2023–present	Coupé	Germany	Limited to 1,963 units
Porsche	911 GT3 S/C	2026	Cabriolet	Germany	
Porsche	911 GT3 R Rennsport (992)	2023	Coupé	Germany	Limited to 77 units, track car only
Porsche	Boxster	1996–2016	Roadster	Germany	
Porsche	Boxster Spyder	2015–2016	Convertible	Germany	
Porsche	Cayman	2005–2016	Coupé	Germany	
Porsche	Cayman GT4	2015–2016	Coupé	Germany	
Porsche	718 Boxster	2016–2024	Roadster	Germany	
Porsche	718 Boxster GTS	2019-2024	Roadster	Germany	
Porsche	718 Spyder	2020-2024	Roadster	Germany	
Porsche	718 Spyder RS	2023-2024	Roadster	Germany	Limited Production
Porsche	718 Cayman	2016–2024	Coupé	Germany	
Porsche	718 Cayman GTS	2019-2024	Coupé	Germany	
Porsche	718 Cayman GT4	2020-2024	Coupé	Germany	
Porsche	718 Cayman GT4 RS	2022-2024	Coupé	Germany	Limited production
Porsche	Carrera GT	2003–2007	Roadster	Germany	MSRP of US$448,000, limited production
Porsche	918 Spyder	2013-2015	Roadster	Germany	Limited production
Porsche	Mission X	2023	Coupé	Germany	Concept car
Porsche	Panamera	2010–present	4-door Hatchback, Sport Turismo	Germany	
Porsche	Taycan	2019–present	4-door Electric Coupé, Cross Turismo	Germany	
Porsche	Taycan Turbo GT	2024	4-door Electric Coupé	Germany	Limited Production
Praga	Bohema	2023	Coupé	Czech Republic	Limited Production
Puritalia	427	2015	Roadster	Italy	Limited production
Puritalia	Berlinetta	2019-	Coupé	Italy	Limited production
Qiantu	K50	2017–present	Coupé	China	
Qvale	Mangusta	1999-2002	Roadster	Italy/United States	
Radical	RXC GT	2014–present	Coupé	United Kingdom	Renamed from RXC Turbo in 2017
Radical	Rapture	2019	Roadster	United Kingdom	
Radical	SR3	2002–present	Roadster	United Kingdom	
Radical	SR3 XXR	2023	Roadster	United Kingdom	Track car only
RAESR	Tachyon Speed	2017	Electric Supercar	United States	
Red Bull	RB17	2025	Coupé		Limited to 50 units, this track-only hypercar developed in-house by Red Bull Advanced Technologies (RBAT) and chief technical officer - Adrian Newey himself.
Renault	15/17	1971-1979	Fastback Coupé	France	
Renault	Alpine GTA/A610	1984-1995	Coupé	France	
Renault	Clio V6 Renault Sport	1999-2006	Hacthback	France	
Renault	Fuego	1980-1992	Coupé	France	
Renault	Spider	1996-1999	Roadster	France	
Renault	Wind	2010-2013	Coupé Convertible	France	
Renault	Mégane R.S.	2004–2023	Hatchback	France	
Rezvani	Beast	2015–present	Coupé, Targa, Speedster	United States	
Rezvani	Beast Alpha	2016	Coupé	United States	
Rezvani	Beast X	2016-present	Coupé	United States	Limited to five units
Rhino	RR01	2024	Coupè	Lithuania	
Rimac	Concept One	2013-2017	Coupé	Croatia	Electric sports car, limited production
Rimac	Nevera	2021–present	Coupé	Croatia	Electric sports car, limited to 150 units
Rimac	Nevera R	2025	Coupé	Croatia	Limited to 40 units
Rinspeed	Ichange	2009	Coupè	Switzerland	Concept car
RMC	Scorpion	2008	Roadster	United States	Hydrogen-powered, limited to 200 units
Rossion	Q1	2008-2018	Coupè	United States	
Saab	9-3 Viggen Pikes Peak	2000	Coupé	Sweden	
Saab	Aero-X	2006	Coupé	Sweden	Concept car
Saab	PhoeniX	2011	Coupé	Sweden	
Saab	Sonett	1955–1974	Coupé, Roadster	Sweden	
Saleen	S7	2000-2007	Coupé	United States	Limited production
Saleen	S5S Raptor	2008	Coupé	United States	Concept car
Saleen	S1	2018	Coupé	United States	
Saleen	S1 GT4	2019	Coupé	United States	
Saleen	S11	2025	Coupé	United States	
Sard	MC8	1995	Coupé	Japan	
Saturn	Sky	2007-2010	Roadster	United States	
Saturn	Sky Red Line	2007-2010	Roadster	United States	More powerful version of base Sky
Sauber	C9	1987	Coupé	Switzerland	
Sauber	C291	1991	Coupé	Switzerland	
Sauber	C292	1992	Coupé	Switzerland	
Savage Rivale	Roadyacht GTS	2009	Sedan	Netherlands	
Sbarro	GT1	1999	Coupé	Switzerland	
Sbarro	GT12	2000	Coupé	Switzerland	Concept car
Sbarro	Alcador	1995-2009	Coupé	Switzerland	
Sbarro	Autobau	2010	Coupé	Switzerland	Concept car
Sbarro	Challenge III	1987	Coupé	Switzerland	
Sbarro	Flèche Rouge	2013	Speedster	Switzerland	
Sbarro	Saetta	2020	Speedster	Switzerland	
Sbarro	Sparta	2014	Hatchback	Switzerland	
Scuderia Cameron Glickenhaus (SCG)	003C/CS/S	2014–present	Coupé	United States	Limited production
Scuderia Cameron Glickenhaus (SCG)	004	2021	Coupé	United States	Limited production
Scuderia Cameron Glickenhaus (SCG)	007S	2025	Coupé	United States	Limited production, street-legal Le Mans hypercar
Scion	FR-S	2012–2016	Coupé	Japan	The same as the Toyota 86, except with HD audio on all models
SEAT	850 Spider	1966-1974	Roadster	Spain	
SEAT	Fórmula	1999	Roadster	Spain	
SEAT	Cupra GT	2003	Coupé	Spain	
Shelby	Series 1	1998-2005	Roadster	United States	
SIN	R1	2015–Present	Coupé	Bulgaria	
Sivax	Streetster Xtile	2004	Roadster	Japan	
Škoda	110 Super Sport	1971	Coupé	Czech	
Small Sports Car	SC01	2022	Coupè	China	
SP Automotive	Chaos	2022	Coupè	Greek	
Spada	Codatronca TS	2008-	Coupé	Italy	Limited production
Spada	Codatronca Monza	2010-	Speedster	Italy	One-off model
Spania GTA	Spano	2010–present	Coupé	Spain	
Spectre	R42	1995-1998	Coupé	England	
Spectre	R45	1997	Coupé	England	
Spyker	B6	2013	Coupé	Netherlands	Concept car
Spyker	C8 Double 12S	2002–2007	Coupé	Netherlands	
Spyker	C8 Laviolette	2001–2009	Coupé, Spyder	Netherlands	
Spyker	C8 Aileron	2009–2016	Coupé, Spyder	Netherlands	
Spyker	C8 Preliator	2016–present	Coupé, Spyder	Netherlands	
Spyker	C8 Preliator XXV	2026	Coupé	Netherlands	
Spyker	C12 La Turbie	2006	Coupé	Netherlands	
Spyker	C12 Zagato	2008	Coupé	Netherlands	One-off model
SSC	Ultimate Aero TT	2006-2013	Coupé	United States	Limited production
SSC	Tuatara	2020–present	Coupé	United States	Limited production
SSC	Tuatara Striker	2021	Coupé	United States	
Stola	S81 Stratos	2000	Coupé	Italy	Concept car
Strathcarron	SC-5A	1999	Roadster	United Kingdom	
SRT	Chrysler Crossfire SRT	2005-2006	Roadster, Coupé	United States	
SRT	Dodge Viper SRT	2006-2010	Roadster, Coupé	United States	Renamed the SRT Viper
SRT	Viper	2012–2017	Roadster, Coupé	United States	Replaced the Dodge and Chrysler Vipers
SS	90	1935	Roadster	England	
Studebaker	Avanti	1962-1963	Coupé	United States	
Sunbeam	Alpine	1953-1975	Roadster	England	
Sylva	Fury	1991-1994	Roadster	England	
Sylva	J15	2008-2010	Roadster	England	
Sylva	Jester	1998-2016	Roadster	England	
Sylva	Leader	1985	Roadster	England	
Sylva	Mojo	2000	Roadster	England	
Sylva	Mojo 2	2004–Present	Roadster	England	
Sylva	Mojo SE	2007–Present	Roadster	England	
Sylva	Phoenix	1988-1999	Roadster	England	
Sylva	R1ot	2005	Roadster	England	Also known as Riot
Sylva	Star	1982	Roadster	England	
Sylva	Striker	1988-1999	Roadster	England	
Sylva	Stylus	1994-1996	Roadster	England	
Subaru	Alcyone	1985-1996	Coupé	Japan	First generation named "XT", second generation named "SVX"
Subaru	BRZ	2012–present	Coupé	Japan	
Subaru	BRZ GT300	2011	Coupé	Japan	
Subaru	WRX	1992–2014 2014–present	Sport compact	Japan	
Subaru	STI E-RA	2022	Coupé	Japan	
Superlite	SL-C	2007	Coupé	United States	
Suzhou	Eagle Carrie	2015	Coupé	China	
Suzuki	Escudo Pikes Peak	1996	Coupé	Japan	
Suzuki	Hayabusa Sport Prototype	2002	Coupé	Japan	
Tata Motors	TaMo Racemo	2017–present	Coupé	India	
Tauro	V8	2012–Present	Roadster, Coupé, Spyder	Spain	
SSZ	Stradale	1984-1999	Coupé	United States	
SSZ	Stradale GT2	1984	Coupé	United States	
Stealth	B6	2000	Coupé	United Kingdom	
Thompson Manufacturing Company (TMC)	Costin	1983-1987	Roadster, Coupé	Ireland	
Techrules	AT96	2016	Coupé	China	
Techrules	Ren	2017	Coupé	China	
Techrules	Ren RS	2018	Coupé	China	
Tesla	Roadster	2008-2012	Roadster	United States	
Tesla	Model S Plaid	2021–present	Sports Sedan	United States	
Tesla	Model 3 Performance	2018–present	Sports Sedan	United States	
TMC	M1	2020	Coupé	Brazil	
TMG	EV P001	2011	Spyder	Germany	
TMG	EV P002	2012	Spyder	Germany	
TMI	VM180	2001	Roadster	Japan	
TOJ	SC03	1975	Spyder	Germany	
TOJ	SC304	1976	Spyder	Germany	
Tommykaira	ZZII	2001	Coupé	Japan	
Torino	ATS Wildtwelve	2015	Coupé	Italy	Concept car
Touring Superleggera	Sciadipersia	2018–present	Coupé, Cabriolet	Italy	Limited production
Touring Superleggera	Aero 3	2021	Coupé	Italy	Limited production
Touring Superleggera	Arese RH95	2021	Coupé	Italy	Limited to 18 units, to celebrate its 95th anniversary
Touring Superleggera	Veloce12	2024–present	Coupé	Italy	Limited to 30 units, based on Ferrari 550 Maranello
Touring Superleggera	Veloce12 Barchetta	2026	Roadster	Italy	Limited Production, based on Ferrari 550 Barchetta
Touring Superleggera	Veloce12 Aperta	2027	Roadster	Italy	Limited Production
Toroidion	1MW	2022	Electric Supercar	Finland	
Toyota	7 Turbo	1969	Roadster	Japan	
Toyota	90C-V	1990	Coupé	Japan	
Toyota	222D	1985	Coupé	Japan	
Toyota	Alessandro Volta	2003	Coupé	Japan	Concept car
Toyota	Sports 800	1965-1969	Roadster, Coupé	Japan	
Toyota	2000GT	1967-1970	Roadster, Coupé	Japan	
Toyota	Celica	1970-2006	Roadster, Coupé	Japan	
Toyota	MR2	1984-1999	Roadster, Coupé	Japan	
Toyota	MR-S	1999-2007	Roadster	Japan	
Toyota	AE86	1984-1987	Coupé, Hatchback	Japan	Also called "Corolla Levin" or "Sprinter Trueno"
Toyota	86	2012–present	Coupé	Japan	Also called "Subaru BRZ"
Toyota	GR Corolla (E210)	2022-	Hatchback	Japan, United States	
Toyota	GR Yaris	2020-present	Hatchback	Japan	WRC Homologation car
Toyota	GR GT	2026	Coupé	Japan	
Toyota	GR GT3	2027	Coupé	Japan	Racecar
Toyota	Paseo	1991-1999	Coupe	Japan	
Toyota	Soarer	1981-2010	Coupe, Convertible	Japan	Also Called "Lexus SC" Since 1991–2005
Toyota	Supra	1978-2002	Coupé	Japan	
Toyota	GR Supra	2019-	Coupé	Japan	
Toyota	GR Supra Racing	2018	Coupé	Japan	
Toyota	GR Super Sport	2018	Coupé	Japan	Concept car
Toyota	FT-Se	2023	Coupé	Japan	Concept car
Toyota	FT-HS	2007	Coupé	Japan	Concept car
Toyota	FT-86	2009	Coupé	Japan	Concept car
Toyota	FT-1	2014	Coupé	Japan	Concept car
Toyota	TS040 Hybrid	2014	Coupé	Japan	
Toyota	GR010 Hybrid	2021	Coupé	Japan	
Tramontana	XTR	2012	Roadster, Speedster	Slovenia	
Tria Design	Lynx	1992	Coupé	United Kingdom	Concept car
Trion	Nemesis	2016	Coupé	United States	
Tushek	Renovatio T500	2012	Targa	Slovenia	
Tushek	TS 900 H	2019	Coupé	Slovenia	
Tuthill	GT One	2024	Coupé	United Kingdom	Planned to build 22 units, based on Porsche 911 GT1
TVR	450 SEAC	1988	Coupé	United Kingdom	
TVR	Tuscan	1967-1971	Coupé	United Kingdom	
TVR	Sagaris	2005-2006	Coupe	United Kingdom	
TVR	Tuscan Speed Six	1999-2006	Targa, Convertible	United Kingdom	
TVR	Typhon	2002	Coupé	United Kingdom	There are only 3 road-legal cars produced
TVR	Griffith	1991-2002, 2017–present	Coupé	United Kingdom	
TVR	Cerbera	1996-2003	Coupé	United Kingdom	
TVR	Cerbera Speed 12	1996	Coupé	United Kingdom	
TVR	Chimaera	1992-2003	Roadster	United Kingdom	
TVR	Tamora	2002-2006	Roadster	United Kingdom	
TVR	T350	2002-2006	Coupé	United Kingdom	
TVR	Project 7/12	1996	Coupé	United Kingdom	
TWR	Supercat	2024	Coupé	United Kingdom	Coupé
Ultima	Mk1	1983	Coupé	United Kingdom	One-off
Ultima	Mk2	1984-1989	Coupé	United Kingdom	13 units sold
Ultima	Mk3	1989-1996	Coupé, Roadster	United Kingdom	13 units sold
Ultima	Sport and Spyder	1992-1996	Coupé, Roadster	United Kingdom	
Ultima	GTR and Can-Am	2000-2015	Coupé, Roadster	United Kingdom	
Ultima	Evolution	2015–present	Coupé, Convertible	United Kingdom	
Ultima	RS	2019–present	Coupé		
UVA	M6 GTR	1982	Coupé	United Kingdom	
Vanda Electrics	Dendrobium	2017	Coupé	United Kingdom	Concept car
Vauxhall	Cavalier BTCC	1990	Sedan	United Kingdom	
Vauxhall	VX220	2000-2005	Roadster	United Kingdom	
Vauxhall	VX Lightning	2003	Roadster	United Kingdom	
Vazirani	Shul	2018	Coupé	India	Concept car
Vega	EVX	2022	Electric Supercar	Sri Lanka	
Veloqx	Fangio	2022	Coupé	United Kingdom	
Vemac	RD200	2004	Coupé	United Kingdom	
VDS	GT 001	2012	Coupé	Belgium	
Veritas	RS-III	2009	Roadster	Germany	
Vector	Avtech WX-3	1992	Coupé	United States	
Vector	Avtech WX-8	2007	Coupé	United States	
Vector	W8	1989	Coupé	United States	
Vector	M12	1995-1999	Coupé	United States	Limited to 17 units
Vencer	Sarthe	2015–present	Coupé	Netherlands	
Venturi	600 LM	1994	Coupé	France	
Venturi	400 GT	1994-1997	Coupé	France	
Venturi	300 GTR	1991-2000	Coupé	France	
Venturi	Fétish	2004–2007	Electric Sports Car	France	
Viritech	Apricale	2022	Coupé	United Kingdom	
Vision	1789	2020	Coupé	France	
Vittori	Turbio	2024	Coupé	United States	
VLF	Force 1	2016-2017	Coupé, Roadster	United States	Limited production
Volkswagen	BlueSport	2009	Roadster	Germany	
Volkswagen	EcoRacer	2005	Coupé, Roadster, Speedster	Germany	
Volkswagen	Karmann Ghia	1955-1974	Coupé, Cabriolet	Germany	
Volkswagen	Scirocco R	2009-2017	Hatchback	Germany	
Volkswagen	W12	1997-2001	Coupé, Roadster	Germany	Concept car
Volkswagen	Passat R36	2007-2010	Sports Sedan, Sports Wagon	Germany	
Volkswagen	Passat CC	2008-2017	4-door Coupé	Germany	
Volkswagen	Arteon R	2021-2025	4-door Coupé/ Shooting Brake	Germany	
Volkswagen	I.D. R	2018	Coupé	Germany	First electric racing car prototype designed as part of Volkswagen's I.D. Project
Volkswagen	ID.X Performance	2023	Liftback	Germany	
Volkswagen	GTI Roadster Vision Gran Turismo	2014	Roadster	Germany	
Volkswagen	XL Sport	2014	Coupé	Germany	Concept car
Volkswagen	XL1	2011	Coupé	Germany	
Volvo	240 Turbo	1980	Sedan	Sweden	
Volvo	850 BTCC	1994	Wagon	Sweden	
Volvo	S60 V8 Supercar	2014	Sedan	Sweden	
Volvo	T6 Roadster	2005	Roadster	Sweden	
Vortex	GTT	2011	Coupé	United Kingdom	
Vortex	V2	2012	Speedster	United Kingdom	
Voyah	i-Land	2020	Sedan	China	
VUHL	05	2008-2017	Roadster	Mexico	
VUHL	05 RR	2016	Roadster	Mexico	
VUHL	05 ROC Edition	2017	Roadster	Mexico	
Weber	Faster One	2008	Coupé	Switzerland	
Wells	Vertige	2021	Coupé	United Kingdom	
Westfield	FW400	1998	Roadster	England	
Westfield	Megablade	2001	Roadster	England	
Westfield	Megabusa	2000–Present	Roadster	England	
Westfield	SDV	2006–Present	Roadster	England	
Westfield	SE	1992	Roadster	England	
Westfield	SEi	1992	Roadster	England	
Westfield	SEight	1991-2010	Roadster	England	
Westfield	XI	1982–2022	Roadster	England	
Westfield	XTR2	2001-2010	Roadster	England	
Westfield	XTR4	2005-2010	Roadster	England	
Westfield	iRacer	2010	Speedster	England	
Wiesmann	MF3	1993-2011	Roadster	Germany	
Wiesmann	MF4	2003-2007	Coupé, Roadster	Germany	
Wiesmann	MF5	2008-2014	Coupé, Roadster	Germany	
Wiesmann	Project Thunderball	2022	Roadster	Germany	
Wiesmann	Spyder	2011	Roadster	Germany	
WM	P76	1976	Coupé	France	
WM	P87	1987	Coupé	France	
WM	P88	1988	Coupé	France	
WR	LM94	1994	Spyder	France	
WR	LM96	1996	Spyder	France	
WR	LM2001	2001	Spyder	France	
WR	LMP2008	2008	Spyder	France	
Wrightspeed	X1	2000	Roadster	United States	
Xiaomi	SU7 Ultra	2024	Sedan	China	
W Motors	Fenyr SuperSport	2018–present	Coupé	Lebanon	Limited to 25 units
W Motors	Lykan HyperSport	2013-2017	Coupé	Lebanon	Limited to seven units
Yamaha	OX99-11	1992	Coupé	Japan	Only three prototypes were built
Yamaha	Sports Ride	2015	Coupé	Japan	
YES!	Cup R	2005	Roadster	Germany	
YES!	Roadster	2003	Roadster	Germany	
YES!	Clubsport	1999	Roadster	Germany	
Zagato	AGTZ Twin Tail	2024	Coupé	Italy	
Zagato	TZ3 Corsa	2010	Coupé	Italy	One-off model
Zagato	TZ3 Stradale	2011	Coupé	Italy	Limited production
Zagato	Mostro	2015	Coupé	Italy	Limited to five units
Zagato	Mostro Barchetta	2022	Roadster	Italy	Limited to five units
Zagato	IsoRivolta GTZ	2021	Coupé	Italy	Limited to 19 units
Zagato	8C Doppia Coda	2025	Coupé	Italy	One-off model
ZAP	Alias	2008	Coupé	United States	
Zedriv	GT3	2019	Coupé	China	
Zeekr	001 FR	2023	Shooting Brake	China	
Zender	Vision 1S	1983	Coupé	Germany	
Zender	Vision 2	1985	Coupé	Germany	
Zender	Vision 3	1987	Coupé	Germany	
Zender	Fact 4	1989	Coupé	Germany	
Zender	Progetto Cinque	1995	Roadster	Germany	
Zender	Escape 6	1997	Coupé	Germany	
Zender	Thirty 7	1999	Roadster	Germany	
Zender	Straight 8	2001	Roadster	Germany	
Zenos	E10	2014-2016	Roadster	England	
Zenos	E10 S	2015-2017	Roadster	England	
Zenos	E10 R	2015-2017	Roadster	England	
Zenos	E10 R Drive Edition	2015-2016	Roadster	England	
Zenos	E10 RZ	2025	Roadster	England	
Zenos	E10 R2	2025	Roadster	England	
Zenvo	Aurora Agil	2023	Coupé	Denmark	
Zenvo	Aurora Tur	2023	Coupé	Denmark	
Zenvo	ST1	2009-2016	Coupé	Denmark	
Zenvo	TS1 GT	2016-2019	Coupé	Denmark	
Zenvo	TS1 GT "Sleipnir"	2017	Coupé	Denmark	
Zenvo	TSR	2016	Coupé	Denmark	
Zenvo	TSR-S	2018–present	Coupé	Denmark	
Zenvo	TSR-GT	2023	Coupé	Denmark	
Zeroacento	273 Potenza	2023	Coupé	Italy	
Ziliani	IZ1	2022	Coupé	Italy	
Zolfe	Orange	2006	Coupé	United Kingdom	
Zolfe	GTC4	2009	Coupé	United Kingdom	
Zytek	04S	2004	Le Mans Prototype	United Kingdom	
Zytek	05S	2005	Le Mans Prototype	United Kingdom	
Zytek	06S	2006	Le Mans Prototype	United Kingdom	
Zytek	07S	2007	Le Mans Prototype	United Kingdom	
Zytek	07S/2	2007	Le Mans Prototype	United Kingdom	
Zytek	Z11SN	2011	Le Mans Prototype	United Kingdom	

== Sports SUVs ==
Manufacturer	Model/Trim	Years	Styles	Country of Origin	Notes
Alfa Romeo	Stelvio Quadrifoglio	2016–present	SUV	Italy	
Aston Martin	DBX707	2022–present	SUV	England	Limited Production
Audi	SQ7 V12 TDI	2006–2012	SUV	Germany	
Audi	RS Q8	2020–present	SUV	Germany	
Bentley	Bentayga Speed	2019–present	SUV	England	
Bentley	Bentayga V8	2018–present	SUV	England	
BMW	iX M60	2021–present	Electric SUV	Germany	
BMW	X3 M/ Competition	2003–present	SUV	Germany	
BMW	X4 M/ Competition	2014–present	Coupé SUV	Germany	
BMW	X5 M/ Competition	1999–present	SUV	Germany	
BMW	X6 M/ Competition	2007–present	Coupé SUV	Germany	
BMW	X7 M60i	2023–present	SUV	Germany	
BMW	XM	2023–present	SUV	Germany	
Chevrolet	Blazer EV.R NASCAR	2025	SUV	United States	
Dodge	Durango SRT Hellcat	2018–present	SUV	United States	
Ferrari	Purosangue	2023–present	Fastback SUV	Italy	
Ford	Mustang Mach-E	2020–present	Electric SUV	United States	
GMC	Hummer EV	2023–present	Electric SUV	United States	
Jaguar	F-Pace SVR	2018–present	SUV	England	
Jeep	Grand Cherokee SRT-8	2013–present	SUV	United States	
Jeep	Grand Cherokee Trackhawk	2017–present	SUV	United States	
Lamborghini	Urus	2018–2022	SUV	Italy	
Lamborghini	Urus Performante	2022–present	SUV	Italy	Limited Production
Lamborghini	Urus SE	2024	SUV	Italy	
Land Rover	Range Rover Sport SVR	2015–2022	SUV	England	
Land Rover	Range Rover Sport SV	2023–present	SUV	England	
Land Rover	Defender OCTA	2024	SUV	England	
Lotus	Eletre	2023–present	Electric SUV	England, China	
Maserati	Grecale Folgore/ Trofeo	2022–present	SUV	Italy	
Maserati	Levante Trofeo	2018–present	SUV	Italy	
Mercedes-AMG	G63	2013–present	SUV	Germany	
Mercedes-AMG	GLC 63/ 63 S	2015–present	SUV	Germany	
Mercedes-AMG	GLC 63/ 63 S Coupé	2015–present	Coupé SUV	Germany	
Mercedes-AMG	GLE53/ 63 S	2015–present	SUV	Germany	
Mercedes-AMG	GLE53/ 63 S Coupé	2015–present	Coupé SUV	Germany	
Mercedes-AMG	GLS63	2015–present	SUV	Germany	
Mercedes-Benz	G55/ G63/ G65 AMG	2002-2018	SUV	Germany	
Porsche	Cayenne	2002–present	SUV	Germany	
Porsche	Cayenne Coupé	2019–present	Coupé SUV	Germany	
Porsche	Cayenne Turbo GT	2021–present	Coupé SUV	Germany	Limited Production
Saturn	Vue Red Line	2004-2009	SUV	United States	
Rezvani	Tank	2017–present	SUV	United States	
Rivian	R1S	2022–present	Electric SUV	United States	
Tesla	Model X Plaid	2015–present	Electric SUV	United States	
Tesla	Model Y	2020–present	Electric SUV	United States	
Volkswagen	Touareg R Plug-in Hybrid	2021–present	SUV	Germany	

== Sports pickups ==
Manufacturer	Model/Trim	Years	Country of Origin	Displacement	Horsepower	Torque
Ford	F-150 FP700	2023–present	United States	4,951 cc (302.1 cu in; 4.951 L)	700 bhp (710 PS; 520 kW)	800 N⋅m (590 lb⋅ft)
Ford	F-150 Raptor R	2023–present	United States	5,163 cc (315.1 cu in; 5.163 L)	720 bhp (730 PS; 540 kW)	868 N⋅m (640 lb⋅ft)
Ford	F-150 Lightning	2023–present	United States	0 cc (0 cu in; 0 L)	572 bhp (580 PS; 427 kW)	1,051 N⋅m (775 lb⋅ft)
Ford	Ranger Raptor	2023–present	United States	1,996 cc (121.8 cu in; 1.996 L)	405 bhp (411 PS; 302 kW)	583 N⋅m (430 lb⋅ft)
Ford	Bronco Raptor	2023–present	United States	2,993 cc (182.6 cu in; 2.993 L)	418 bhp (424 PS; 312 kW)	597 N⋅m (440 lb⋅ft)
Ram	1500 TRX	2021-2024	United States	6,166 cc (376.3 cu in; 6.166 L)	702 bhp (712 PS; 523 kW)	881 N⋅m (650 lb⋅ft)
Ram	1500 RHO	2025–present	United States	2,993 cc (182.6 cu in; 2.993 L)	540 bhp (550 PS; 400 kW)	706 N⋅m (521 lb⋅ft)
Ram	1500 Ramcharger	to commence	United States	0 cc (0 cu in; 0 L)	654 bhp (663 PS; 488 kW)	949 N⋅m (700 lb⋅ft)
Rivian	R1T Quad Motor	2023-2024	United States	0 cc (0 cu in; 0 L)	835 bhp (847 PS; 623 kW)	1,231 N⋅m (908 lb⋅ft)
Rivian	R1T Quad Motor Ascend	2024–present	United States	0 cc (0 cu in; 0 L)	1,025 bhp (1,039 PS; 764 kW)	1,495 N⋅m (1,103 lb⋅ft)
GMC	Hummer EV	2021–present	United States	0 cc (0 cu in; 0 L)	1,000 bhp (1,000 PS; 750 kW)	1,627 N⋅m (1,200 lb⋅ft)
Tesla	Cybertruck Beast	2024–present	United States	0 cc (0 cu in; 0 L)	834 bhp (846 PS; 622 kW)	1,003 N⋅m (740 lb⋅ft)
Chevrolet	Silverado EV	2024–present	United States	0 cc (0 cu in; 0 L)	754 bhp (764 PS; 562 kW)	1,064 N⋅m (785 lb⋅ft)

== Sport Trims ==
Manufacturer	Model/Trim	Years	Styles	Country of Origin	Notes
Alfa Romeo	147 GTA	2002-2010	Hot Hatch	Italy	
Alfa Romeo	Giulietta Quadrifoglio Verde	2010-2020	Hot Hatch	Italy	
Alfa Romeo	156 GTA	2001-2007	Sports Sedan, Wagon	Italy	
AMC	Concord Sport	1978	Coupé, Hatchback	United States	
AMC	Eagle Sport	1980-1988	Hatchback	United States	
AMC	Gremlin GT	1978	Hatchback	United States	
AMC	Gremlin X	1971-1978	Coupé, Hatchback	United States	
AMC	Green Hornet	1972	Coupé	Canada	
AMC	Hornet Rallye	1972-1977	Coupé, Hatchback, Wagon	United States	
AMC	Hornet Rallye X	1972-1977	Coupé, Hatchback, Wagon	United States	
AMC	Hornet SC/360	1971	Coupé	United States	
AMC	Hornet X	1972-1977	Coupé, Hatchback, Wagon	United States	
AMC	Matador X	1974-1978	Coupé	United States	
AMC	Pacer Sport	1978	Hatchback	United States	
AMC	Pacer X	1975-1978	Hatchback	United States	
AMC	Rambler American 440-H	1963-1965	Coupé	United States	
AMC	Rambler Classic 770-H	1964-1965	Coupé	United States	
AMC	Rambler Rebel	1966	Coupé	United States	
AMC	Rambler Rogue	1966-1967	Coupé	United States	
AMC	SC/Rambler	1969	Coupé	United States	
AMC	Rambler Typhoon	1964	Coupé	United States	
AMC	Rebel Machine	1970	Coupé	United States	
AMC	Rebel Raider	1969	Coupé	United States	
AMC	Spirit GT	1979-1983	Hatchback	United States	
Buick	Century Free Spirit	1975-1976	Coupé	United States	
Buick	Century GS	1973-1975	Coupé	United States	
Buick	Lesabre Grand National	1986	Coupé	United States	
Buick	Lesabre Sport Coupe	1977-1980	Coupé	United States	
Buick	Lesabre T-Type	1981-1985	Coupé	United States	
Buick	Regal GNX	1987	Coupé	United States	
Buick	Regal Grand National	1982, 1984–1987	Coupé	United States	
Buick	Regal GS	1989-2004	Coupé	United States	
Buick	Regal GSX	2003-2004	Coupé	United States	
Buick	Regal Sport Coupe	1978-1982	Coupé	United States	
Buick	Regal T-Type	1983	Coupé	United States	
Buick	Riviera GS	1965-1975	Coupé	United States	
Buick	Riviera S/R	1976	Coupé	United States	
Buick	Riviera T-Type	1979-1989	Coupé	United States	
Buick	Skyhawk Road Hawk	1979-1980	Hatchback	United States	
Buick	Skylark GS	1965-1972	Coupé, Convertible	United States	
Buick	Skylark GSX	1970-1972	Coupé	United States	
Buick	Wildcat GS	1966	Coupé, Convertible	United States	
Cadillac	ATS-V	2016-2019	Sports Sedan, Coupé	United States	
Cadillac	CTS-V	2008-2019	Sports Sedan, Coupé, Wagon	United States	
Chevrolet	Chevrolet Cobalt SS	2008-2010	Coupé	United States	Turbocharged rather than supercharged like its previous iteration.
Chevrolet	Chevrolet Cobalt SS Supercharged	2005-2007	Coupé	United States	
Chevrolet	Chevelle Malibu SS	1964-1976	Coupé, Convertible, Wagon	United States	Pickup version sold as El Camino SS
Chevrolet	"Heavy Chevy" Chevelle	1971	Coupé	United States	
Chevrolet	Chevette Rally	1976-1987	Coupé, Hatchback	United States	
Chevrolet	Corvair Corsa	1965-1966	Coupé, Convertible	United States	
Chevrolet	Corvair Monza Spyder	1962-1964	Coupé, Convertible	United States	
Chevrolet	Impala SS	1961-1969, 1994–1996	Coupé, Convertible	United States	
Chevrolet	Laguna SS	1973	Coupé, Wagon	United States	
Chevrolet	Laguna Type S-3	1974-1976	Coupé	United States	
Chevrolet	Malibu El Camino Black Knight	1978	Pickup	United States	
Chevrolet	Malibu El Camino Royal Knight	1979-1983	Pickup	United States	
Chevrolet	Malibu El Camino SS	1978-1987	Pickup	United States	
Chevrolet	Monte Carlo SS	1970-1971, 1983–1988, 2000–2007	Coupé	United States	
Chevrolet	Monte Carlo Z34	1995-1999	Coupé	United States	
Chevrolet	Monza Mirage	1977	Hatchback	United States	
Chevrolet	Monza Spyder	1976-1980	Coupé, Hatchback	United States	
Chevrolet	Nova Rally	1977-1978	Coupé, Hatchback	United States	
Chevrolet	Nova SS	1963-1976	Coupé, Hatchback, Convertible	United States	
Chevrolet	Cosworth Vega	1975-1976	Hatchback	United States	
Chevrolet	Vega GT	1971-1977	Hatchback, Wagon	United States	
Dodge	Aspen Kit Car	1978	Coupé	United States	
Dodge	Aspen R/T	1976-1980	Coupé	United States	
Dodge	Aspen Sport Wagon	1979-1980	Wagon	United States	
Dodge	Aspen Sunrise	1978-1980	Coupé	United States	
Dodge	Aspen Super Coupe	1977-1980	Coupé	United States	
Dodge	Aspen Super R/T	1977	Coupé	United States	
Dodge	Colt GT	1973-1977	Coupé, Hatchback	United States	
Dodge	Colt GTS	1984	Hatchback	United States	
Dodge	Colt RS	1979-1983	Hatchback	United States	
Dodge	Coronet R/T	1967-1970	Coupé, Convertible	United States	
Dodge	Dart Charger	1965-1966	Coupé	United States	
Dodge	Dart GT	1963-1969	Coupé, Convertible	United States	
Dodge	Dart GTS	1967-1969	Coupé, Convertible	United States	
Dodge	Dart Hemi	1968	Coupé	United States	
Dodge	Dart Sport	1973-1976	Coupé	United States	
Dodge	Demon 340	1971-1972	Coupé	United States	
Dodge	Demon Sizzler	1971	Coupé	United States	
Dodge	Lancer GT	1962	Coupé	United States	
Dodge	Omni 024	1979-1982	Hatchback	United States	
Dodge	Omni 024 de Tomaso	1980-1982	Hatchback	United States	
Dodge	Polara 500	1962-1964	Coupé	United States	
Dodge	Swinger 340	1969-1970	Coupé, Convertible	United States	
Ford	Escort GLX	1982-1983	Hatchback	United States	
Ford	Escort GT	1982-1996	Coupé, Hatchback	United States	
Ford	Escort LX	1984	Hatchback	United States	
Ford	Escort SS	1981	Hatchback	United States	
Ford	Fairlane 500 Sports Coupe	1962-1965	Coupé	United States	
Ford	Fairlane GT	1966-1967	Coupé, Convertible	United States	Pickup version sold as Ranchero GT
Ford	Fairlane GTA	1966-1967	Coupé, Convertible	United States	
Ford	Fairlane XL	1966-1967	Coupé, Convertible	United States	
Ford	Falcon Sprint	1963-1965	Coupé, Convertible	United States	
Ford	Falcon GT	1967-2014	Full sized sedan	Australia	
Ford	Fiesta S	1978-1980	Hatchback	United States	
Ford	Focus RS	2002–2019	Sports Sedan, Hot Hatch	United States	The original Focus RS was only available in Europe.
Ford	Focus ST	2005–present	Sports Sedan, Hot Hatch	United States	
Ford	Galaxie 500 XL	1963-66	Coupé, Convertible	United States	
Ford	LTD II Sports Touring Package	1977-1979	Coupé	United States	Pickup version sold as Ranchero GT
Ford	Maverick Grabber	1970-1975	Coupé	United States	
Ford	Maverick Sprint	1972	Coupé	United States	
Ford	Maverick Stallion	1976-1977	Coupé	United States	
Ford	Pinto w/Cruising Package	1977-1980	Hatchback, Wagon	United States	
Ford	Pinto ESS	1979-1980	Coupé, Hatchback, Wagon	United States	
Ford	Pinto Rallye	1978-1980	Coupé, Hatchback, Wagon	United States	
Ford	Pinto Sport	1973-1980	Coupé, Hatchback, Wagon	United States	
Ford	Pinto Sprint	1972	Coupé, Hatchback	United States	
Ford	Pinto Stallion	1976-1977	Coupé, Hatchback, Wagon	United States	
Ford	Torino Cobra	1969-1971	Coupé	United States	
Ford	Torino GT	1968-1971	Coupé, Convertible	United States	Pickup version sold as Ranchero GT
Ford	Gran Torino Sport	1972-1975	Coupé	United States	Pickup version sold as Ranchero GT
Ford	Torino Talladega	1969	Coupé	United States	
GMC	Caballero Diablo	1978-1987	Pickup (using Chevrolet Malibu body)	United States	
GMC	Sprint SP	1971-1977	Pickup (using Chevrolet Chevelle body)	United States	
Honda	Accord/ Accord Euro R/ Accord Type R	1976–present	Coupé, Sports Sedan	Japan	Accord Euro R production since 1997–2007
Honda	Civic Si	1984–present	Sports Compact	Japan	
Honda	Civic SiR	1999-2005	Sports Compact, Hot Hatch	Canada	Equivalent to USDM Si.
Honda	Civic Type R	1997–present	Hot Hatch, Sports Compact	Japan	
Hyundai	Elantra N	2021–present	Sports Compact	South Korea	
Hyundai	Veloster N	2017–present	Hot Hatch, Sports Compact	South Korea	
Hyundai	i20 N	2020–present	Hot Hatch, Sports Compact	South Korea	
Hyundai	i30 N	2017–present	Hot Hatch, Sports Compact/ Sedan	South Korea	
Hyundai	Kona N	2017–present	SubCompact Crossover	South Korea	
Hyundai	Ioniq 5 N	2021-Present	Electric compact SUV	South Korea	
Hyundai	Ioniq 6 N	2026	Electric Fastback Sedan	South Korea	
Lexus	IS F	2007-2008	Sports Sedan	Japan	
Lexus	GS F	2016-2018	Sports Sedan	Japan	
Mazda	Mazda6	2002–present	Sports sedan	Japan	
Mazda	Mazda3 MPS	2007-2013	Hot Hatch, Sports Compact	Japan	
Mercedes-AMG	A35/ A45/ A45 S	2013–present	Sports Compact, Hot Hatch	Germany	
Mercury	Bobcat Sport	1976-1980	Hatchback	United States	
Mercury	Comet Cyclone	1964-1967	Coupé, Convertible	United States	
Mercury	Comet GT	1971-1975	Coupé	United States	
Mercury	Comet S-22	1961-1963	Coupé, Convertible	United States	
Mercury	Comet Sport	1976-1977	Coupé	United States	
Mercury	Cougar Eliminator	1969-1970	Coupé	United States	
Mercury	Cougar GT	1967-1968	Coupé, Convertible	United States	
Mercury	Cougar GTE	1968	Coupé, Convertible	United States	
Mercury	Cougar Sports Special	1969	Coupé, Convertible	United States	
Mercury	Cougar XR-7G	1967	Coupé, Convertible	United States	
Mercury	Lynx RS	1980-1984	Hatchback	United States	
Mercury	Lynx XR3	1985-1986	Hatchback	United States	
Mercury	Meteor S-33	1962-1963	Coupé	United States	
Mercury	Montego GT	1971-1973	Coupé, Convertible	United States	
Mercury	Monterey S-55	1962-1967	Coupé, Convertible	United States	
Mini	JCW	2008–present	Sports Compact, Hot Hatch/ Cabriolet	United Kingdom	
Mitsubishi	Lancer Evolution	1992–2016	Sports Sedan	Japan	
Oldsmobile	Cutlass 4-4-2	1964-1981	Coupé, Convertible	United States	
Oldsmobile	Hurst/Olds Cutlass	1968-1969, 1972–1975, 1979, 1983–1984	Coupé, Convertible	United States	
Oldsmobile	Cutlass Rallye 350	1970	Coupé	United States	
Oldsmobile	Ninety-Eight Touring Sedan	1987-1993	Sedan	United States	
Oldsmobile	Omega ES	1982-1984	Coupé, Sedan	United States	
Oldsmobile	Omega S	1974-1975	Coupé, Hatchback	United States	
Oldsmobile	Omega SX	1976-1981	Coupé, Hatchback	United States	
Oldsmobile	Starfire Firenza	1979-1980	Hatchback	United States	
Oldsmobile	Starfire GT	1979-1980	Hatchback	United States	
Oldsmobile	Starfire SX	1976-1978	Hatchback	United States	
Peugeot	508 PSE	2021-	Sedan, Sportswagon	France	Limited Production
Plymouth	Champ Rallye	1980-1982	Hatchback	United States	
Plymouth	Duster 340	1970-1973	Coupé	United States	
Plymouth	Duster 360	1974-1975	Coupé	United States	
Plymouth	Duster Twister	1971-1974	Coupé	United States	
Plymouth	Sport Fury	1967-1968	Coupé	United States	
Plymouth	Horizon E-Type	1982	Hatchback	United States	
Plymouth	Horizon TC3 Sport	1979-1980	Hatchback	United States	
Plymouth	Horizon TC3 Turismo	1980	Hatchback	United States	
Plymouth	Valiant Signet 200	1962-1963	Coupé, Convertible	United States	
Plymouth	Volare Duster	1978-1980	Coupé	United States	
Plymouth	Volare Front Runner	1978	Coupé	United States	
Plymouth	Volare Fun Runner	1978	Coupé	United States	
Plymouth	Volare Road Runner	1976-1980	Coupé	United States	
Plymouth	Volare Sport Wagon	1979-1980	Wagon	United States	
Plymouth	Volare Super Coupe	1977-1980	Coupé	United States	
Pontiac	Astre GT	1975-1977	Hatchback, Wagon	United States	
Pontiac	"Li'l Wide Track" Astre	1975	Hatchback	United States	
Pontiac	Grand Am GT	1992-2005	Coupé	United States	
Pontiac	LeMans Can Am	1977	Coupé	United States	
Pontiac	LeMans GT	1972	Coupé	United States	
Pontiac	LeMans GT-37	1970-1971	Coupé	United States	
Pontiac	LeMans GTO	1973	Coupé	United States	
Pontiac	LeMans Sport	1968-1977	Coupé, Convertible	United States	
Pontiac	LeMans Sprint	1966-1969	Coupé, Convertible	United States	
Pontiac	Sunbird Formula	1977-1980	Hatchback	United States	
Pontiac	Sunbird GT	1986-1993	Coupé	United States	
Pontiac	Tempest Custom S	1969	Coupé	United States	
Pontiac	Tempest LeMans	1962-1963	Coupé	United States	
Pontiac	Tempest Sprint	1966-1968	Coupé	United States	
Pontiac	Ventura GTO	1975	Coupé	United States	
Pontiac	Ventura Sprint	1971-1975	Coupé	United States	
Saturn	ION Red Line	2004-2007	Coupé	United States	Same as the Chevrolet Cobalt SS Supercharged
Saturn	SC2 GT	2001-2002	3-door Coupé	United States	
Subaru	Impreza WRX STI	1992–2014	Hot Hatch, Sports Sedan	Japan	
Subaru	WRX STI	2015–present	Sports Sedan	Japan	Previously known as the Impreza WRX STI
SEAT	Cupra R	1998–present	Hot Hatch, Sports Compact	Spain	
Toyota	Corolla	1974–present	Sport Compact	Japan	
Volkswagen	Golf GTi	1975–present	Hot Hatch, Sports Compact	Germany	
Volkswagen	Golf R	2011–present	Hot Hatch, Sports Compact	Germany	
Volvo	S60 Polestar	2013–2018	Sports Sedan	Sweden	Limited Production
Volvo	V60 Polestar	2013–2018	Sports Wagon	Sweden	Limited Production

== Tuner Cars ==
Tuner	Model	Platform	Years	Country of Origin	Notes
7X Design	GTO Vision	Ferrari 488 GTB	2019	United Kingdom	
7X Design	Rayo	Lamborghini Huracán LP610-4	2021	United Kingdom	
9ff	9F-T6	Porsche 911 (996)	2004	Germany	
9ff	Boxster GTB	Porsche Boxster (986)	2003	Germany	
9ff	BT-2	Porsche 911 (997)	2009	Germany	
9ff	Carrera GTC	Porsche 911 (996)	2003	Germany	
9ff	Cayman CR-42	Porsche Cayman (987)	2006	Germany	
9ff	CT-78	Porsche Cayman (987)	2007	Germany	
9ff	DR700	Porsche 911 (997)	2010	Germany	
9ff	DraXster	Porsche 911 (997)	2008	Germany	
9ff	F92 GTurbo	Porsche 911 (992)	2024	Germany	
9ff	F97 A-Max	Porsche 911 (997)	2013	Germany	
9ff	GT9	Porsche 911 (997)	2007	Germany	
9ff	GT9 Vmax	Porsche 911 (997)	2012	Germany	
9ff	GT9-CS	Porsche 911 (997)	2011	Germany	
9ff	GT9-R	Porsche 911 (997)	2009	Germany	
9ff	GTronic 1000	Porsche 911 (997)	2010	Germany	
9ff	GTronic 1200	Porsche 911 (997)	2012	Germany	
9ff	GTronic 1400	Porsche 911 (997)	2015	Germany	
9ff	GT-T900	Porsche Carrera GT	2008	Germany	
9ff	GTurbo 750	Porsche 911 (997)	2009	Germany	
9ff	GTurbo 1000	Porsche 911 (997)	2010	Germany	
9ff	GTurbo 1200	Porsche 911 (997)	2012	Germany	
9ff	GTurbo R	Porsche 911 (997)	2011	Germany	
9ff	Speed9	Porsche 911 (997)	2009	Germany	
9ff	TR-1000	Porsche 911 (997)	2009	Germany	
9ff	TRC-85	Porsche 911 (996)	2006	Germany	
9ff	TRC-91	Porsche 911 (997)	2007	Germany	
9ff	Turbo 9fT1	Porsche 911 (996)	2003	Germany	
9ff	V400	Porsche 911 (996)	2004	Germany	
ABT	R8-R	Audi R8	2017	Germany	
ABT	R8 GTR	Audi R8	2010	Germany	
ABT	RS3-R	Audi RS3	2022	Germany	
ABT	RS4-R	Audi RS4	2018	Germany	
ABT	RS5-R	Audi RS5	2018–Present	Germany	
ABT	RS6-R	Audi RS6	2020	Germany	
ABT	RS7-R	Audi RS 7	2020	Germany	
ABT	Audi TT-R DTM	Audi TT	1999	Germany	
ABT	XGT	Audi R8 LMS GT2	2023	Germany	
AC Schnitzer	ACL2	BMW M235i	2016	Germany	
AC Schnitzer	ACZ4	BMW Z4	2017	Germany	
AC Schnitzer	BMW i8	BMW i8	2015	Germany	
AC Schnitzer	GP3.10	BMW E92	2007	Germany	
AC Schnitzer	Raptor	Mini Cooper S	2012	Germany	
AC Schnitzer	Tension Street Version	BMW E63	2006	Germany	
AC Schnitzer	V8 Topster	BMW Z4	2003	Germany	
Affolter	Diablo GTR Le Mans	Lamborghini Diablo	1999	Switzerland	
ART	CLS GTR 374	Mercedes-Benz C219	2007	Germany	
BimmerWorld	Bergsteiger	BMW E36	2019	United States	
Brabus	Rocket 800	Mercedes-Benz CLS63 AMG	2012	Germany	
Brabus	800 Roadster	Mercedes-Benz SL65 AMG	2013	Germany	
Brabus	820	Porsche 911	2022	Germany	
Brabus	900 Peetch	Porsche 911	2024	Germany	
Brabus	Rocket 900 Coupé	Mercedes-AMG S65 Coupé	2016	Germany	
Brabus	Rocket 900 Cabrio	Mercedes-AMG S65 Cabriolet	2017	Germany	
Brabus	Rocket 900 'One of Ten'	Mercedes-AMG GT63 S	2021	Germany	Limited to 10 units
Brabus	Rocket GTS	Mercedes-Benz SL-Class	2024	Germany	
Carlsson	C25 Royale Super GT	Mercedes-Benz SL-Class	2011	Germany	
Coloni	S1	Alfa Romeo 156	2000	Italy	
Edo Competition	575 GTS	Ferrari 575M Maranello	2003	Germany	
Edo Competition	MC12 Corsa	Maserati MC12	2007	Germany	
FAB Design	Chimera	McLaren MP4-12C	2013	Switzerland	
FAB Design	Desire	Mercedes-Benz SLR McLaren	2009	Switzerland	
Gemballa	GTR 8XX EVO-R	Porsche 911	2019	Germany	
Gemballa	Mirage GT	Porsche Carrera GT	2007–present	Germany	
Gemballa	MIG-U1	Ferrari Enzo	2010	Germany	Limited to 25 units
Gemballa	Mistrale	Porsche Panamera	2009	Germany	
G-Power	M5 Hurricane RR/RS	BMW M5	2010–Present	Germany	
Gunther Werks	F-26	Porsche 993	2024	United States	
Hamann	Volcano	Mercedes-Benz SLR McLaren	2008	Germany	
HWA	Evo	Mercedes-Benz 190E 2.5-16 Evolution II	2023	Germany	
Keyvany	Porroo	Ferrari Purosangue	2024	Germany	
Koenig Specials	911 Turbo Road Runner	Porsche 911 Turbo	1987	Germany	
Koenig Specials	C62	Porsche 962	1990	Germany	
Mansory	Cabrera	Lamborghini Aventador SVJ	2020	Switzerland	
Mansory	F8XX Spider Tempesta Turchese	Ferrari F8 Spider	2024	Switzerland	
Mansory	Le Mansory	Ford GT	2020	Switzerland	
Mansory	MCX Pergusa	Maserati MC20	2024	Switzerland	
Mansory	Stallone	Ferrari 812 Superfast	2018	Switzerland	
Novitec Rosso	F12 N-Largo S	Ferrari F12 Berlinetta	2015	Germany	
Novitec Rosso	TuLesto	Ferrari F430	2009	Germany	
RUF	CTR3 Clubsport	Porsche 911	2012	Germany	
RUF	Turbo Florio	Porsche 911	2012	Germany	
Strosek	Mega 30	Porsche 964	2021	Germany	
Studiotorino	RK Coupe	Porsche Cayman	2006	Italy	
TechArt	GT Street RS	Porsche 911	2019	Germany	
Totem	GT Super SP	Alfa Romeo Giulia	2024	Italy	
Value Progress	Beast	Lamborghini Diablo	2025	Japan	
