= Caterham Project V =

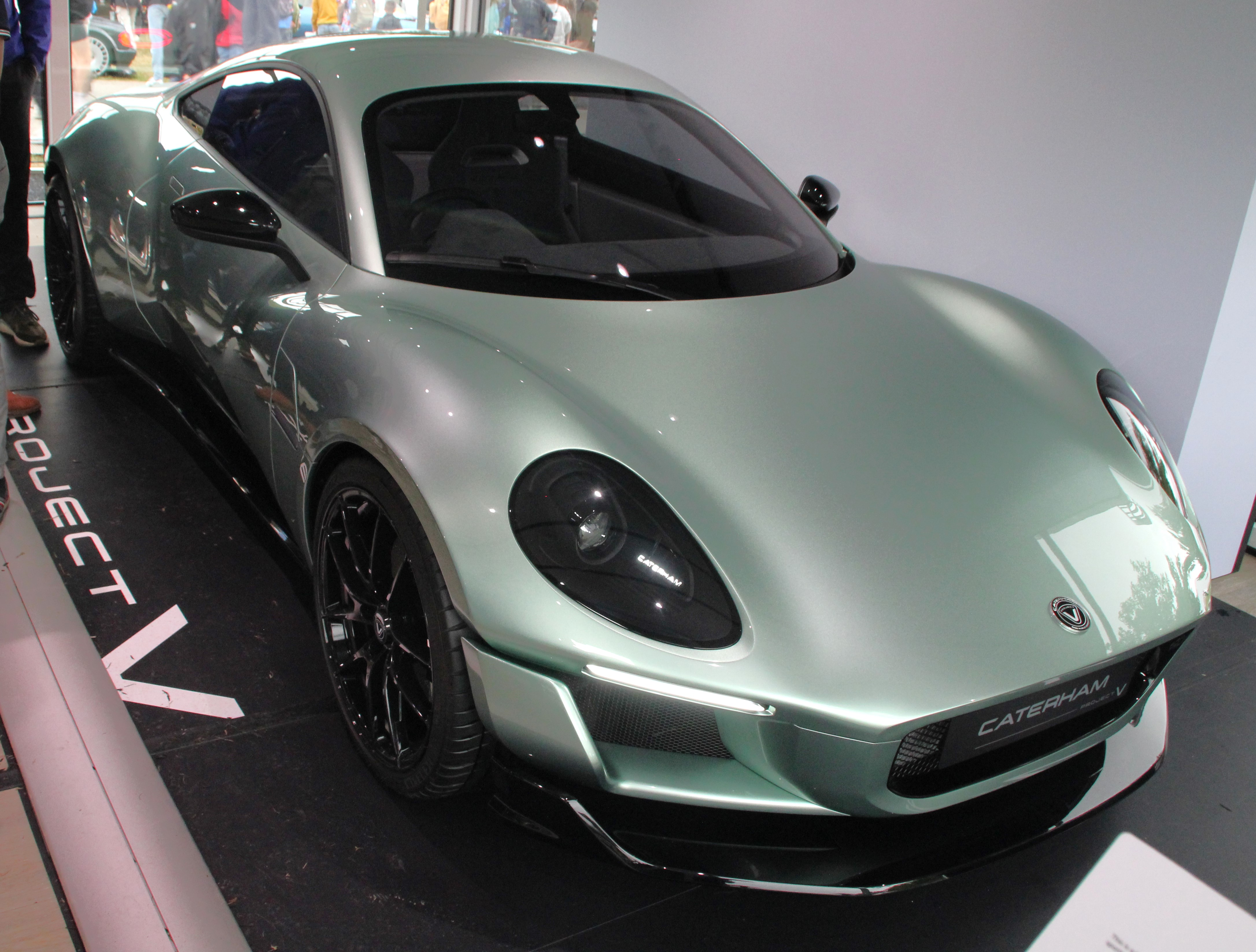

Overview
- Manufacturer: Caterham Cars
- Production: 2027 (to commence)
- Designer: Anthony Jannarelly

Body and chassis
- Class: Sports car (S)

Powertrain
- Power output: 272 PS (200 kW; 268 bhp)
- Electric range: 250 miles (400 km) (WLTP)

Dimensions
- Wheelbase: 2,586 mm (101.8 in)
- Length: 4,255 mm (168 in)
- Width: 1,893 mm (75 in)
- Height: 1,226 mm (48 in)
- Kerb weight: 1,190 kg (2,620 lb)

The Caterham Project V is an upcoming electric sports car to be produced by Caterham Cars and it is set to be released in late 2027.

== Presentation ==
On 7 June 2023, Caterham Cars announced that the Project V would be presented on 12 July 2023, with production starting in 2027.

The Project V is the work of French designer Anthony Jannarelly, co-founder of the Jannarelly brand, which produces the Design-1, and became Caterham's chief of design in November 2022.

== Overview ==
Caterham is currently developing a prototype vehicle with collaboration partners TOKYO R&D Co., Ltd. and Yamaha Motor Co., Ltd., with the aim of completing it in 2027. Yamaha Motor is providing a lightweight compact electric powertrain and their latest e-axle. Furthermore, XING Mobility, another Taiwanese partner, supplies its immersion-cooled battery pack called "IMMERSIO Cell-to-Pack (CTP)", in which the cells are immersed in a dielectric liquid, more safety is ensured through fast and even heat dissipation and an energy density of 200 Wh/kg.

== See also ==
- JMEV 01
