= Small Sports Car SC01 =

Battery electric sports car

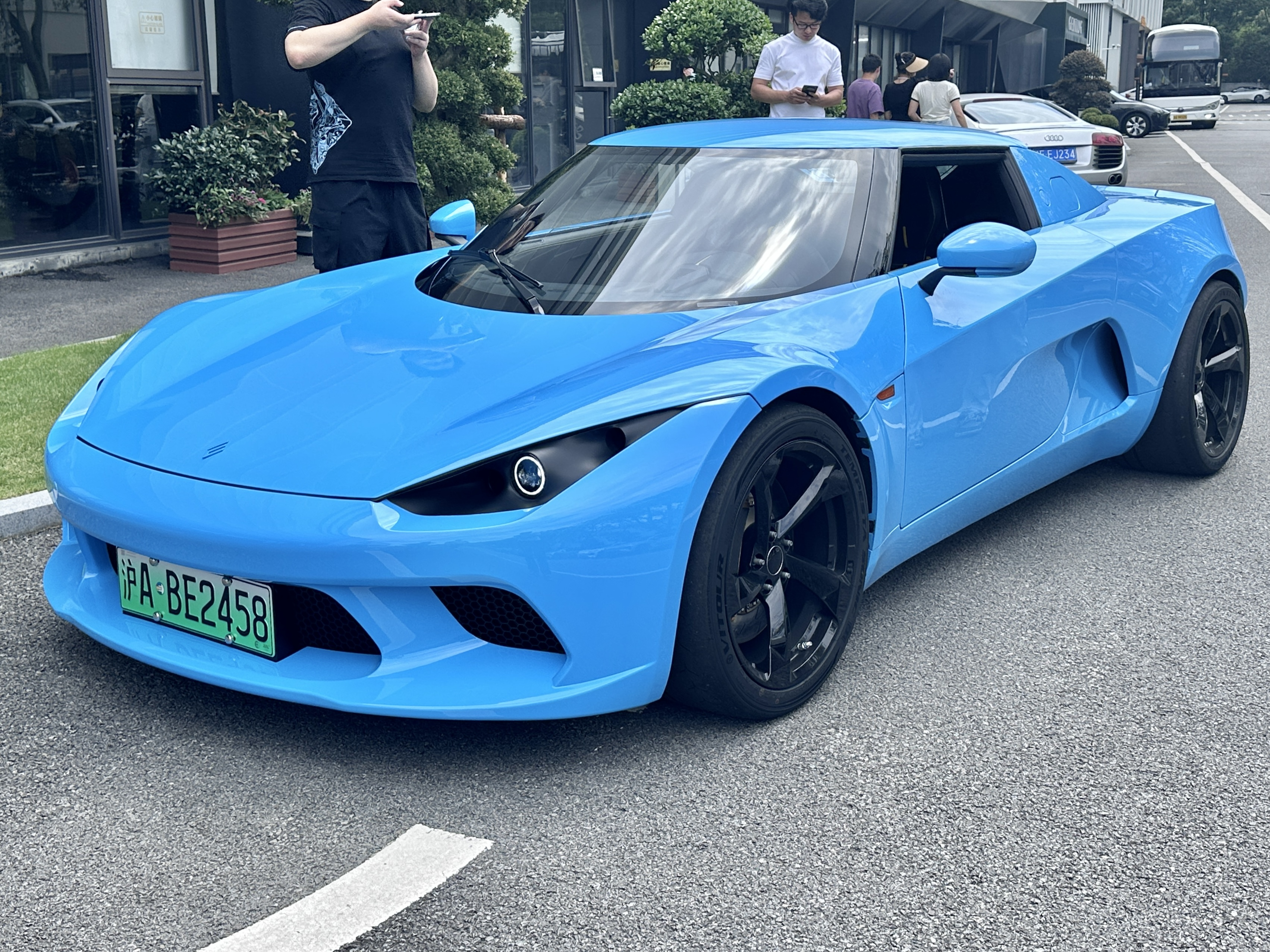

Overview
- Manufacturer: Tianjin Gongjiang Pai Auto Technology
- Also called: SSC SC01; Xiaopaoche SC01; JMEV 01
- Production: April 2025 – present
- Assembly: China: Nanchang (JMEV)
- Designer: Feng Xiaotong

Body and chassis
- Class: Sports car (S)
- Body style: 2-door coupé
- Layout: Dual-motor, all-wheel drive
- Chassis: Tubular space frame

Powertrain
- Electric motor: 2×160 kW TZ200XSWMA permanent magnet synchronous
- Power output: 429 hp (320 kW; 435 PS)
- Battery: 60 kWh NMC CALB
- Electric range: 520 km (320 mi) (CLTC)

Dimensions
- Wheelbase: 2,503 mm (98.5 in)
- Length: 4,106 mm (161.7 in)
- Width: 1,830 mm (72 in)
- Height: 1,170 mm (46 in)
- Curb weight: 1,365–1,370 kg (3,009–3,020 lb)

The Small Sports Car (SSC) SC01 (Chinese: 小跑车SC01; pinyin: xiǎo pǎochē SC01; lit. 'Small Sports Car SC01') is a battery electric two-seater coupe sports car produced by JMEV, a subsidiary of Jiangling Motors. It was originally unveiled in September 2022 by the boutique tuner startup Tianjin Gongjiang Pai Auto Technology who designed, engineered, and markets the vehicle, before it was brought under JMEV as the JMEV 01 (Chinese: 江铃羿驰 01; pinyin: jiānglíng yìchí 01) for contract manufacturing and access to a sales license in 2025. It went on sale in April 2025 after launching at Auto Shanghai 2025 with its original name, Small Sports Car SC01.

== Background ==
In 2016, the tuner startup Gongjiang Pai (Chinese: 天津工匠派汽车科技有限公司) was founded in Tianjin by Feng Xiaotong (Chinese: 冯晓彤), known for running China Car Custom on social media since 2014. Feng and the company have modified several vehicles in the past, including the Chery eQ1, Porsche 911 and Mitsubishi 3000GT. Additionally, it has also hand-built race cars for racing teams, and was responsible for making the 800 hp (600 kW; 810 PS) WM Weltmeister prototype concept car, which is based on a heavily modified Weltmeister W6 and can accelerate from 0–100 km/h (62 mph) in 1.8 seconds. The company has received investment on the scale of tens of millions of Chinese yuan from Xiaomi Group, and Xiaomi co-founder Liu De serves on the board of directors.

On September 21, 2022 Feng announced the launch of the Small Sports Car (Chinese: 小跑车; pinyin: xiǎo pǎochē). Days later on September 25, the company unveiled the development of the SC01 with exterior images along with some preliminary specifications. According to Feng, the 'SC' in the name SC01 stands for 'sports car'. Pre-order reservations were opened with a deposit of CN¥ 199 (approximately US$30), with the company expecting the price to be under CN¥ 300,000 (US$41,950) when official orders planned to open in the third quarter of 2023 and deliveries beginning in the fourth quarter.

In August 2023, Feng shared an update on social media showing that the SC01 was undergoing hot weather testing for regulatory approval process at Turpan, near the Taklamakan Desert. In September 2023, the production version of the SC01 was revealed along with detailed specifications and images of the interior. In January 2024, the company announced that the first SC01 was completed on the production line, and that it intends to start deliveries by the end of the year.

In January 2025, a publicly available regulatory filing to China's MIIT revealed that the vehicle had become part of the JMEV brand to obtain a sales license, and had been legally renamed to the JMEV 01. The SC01 was launched on 26 April 2025, with founder Feng Xiaotong forgoing an attention-grabbing keynote event or marketing campaign, and instead providing the information through a series of Weibo posts, while he announced the car was displayed at Auto Shanghai 2025 at a booth in the supplier hall. The car is simply marketed as 'Small Sports Car SC01' with no brand name, and is available in a single variant with a price of CN¥ 229,800 (US$31,600).

== Overview ==
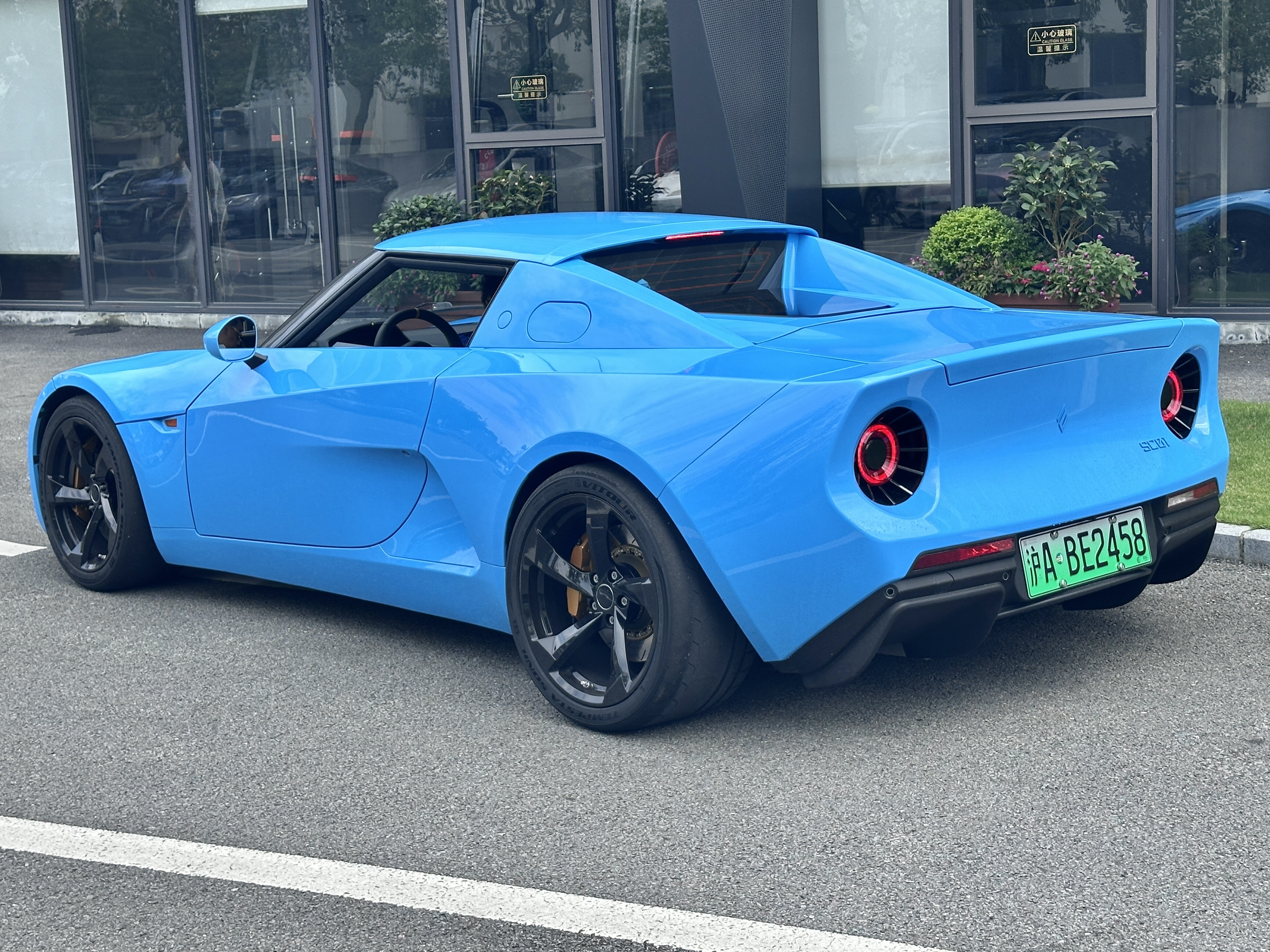
Rear view

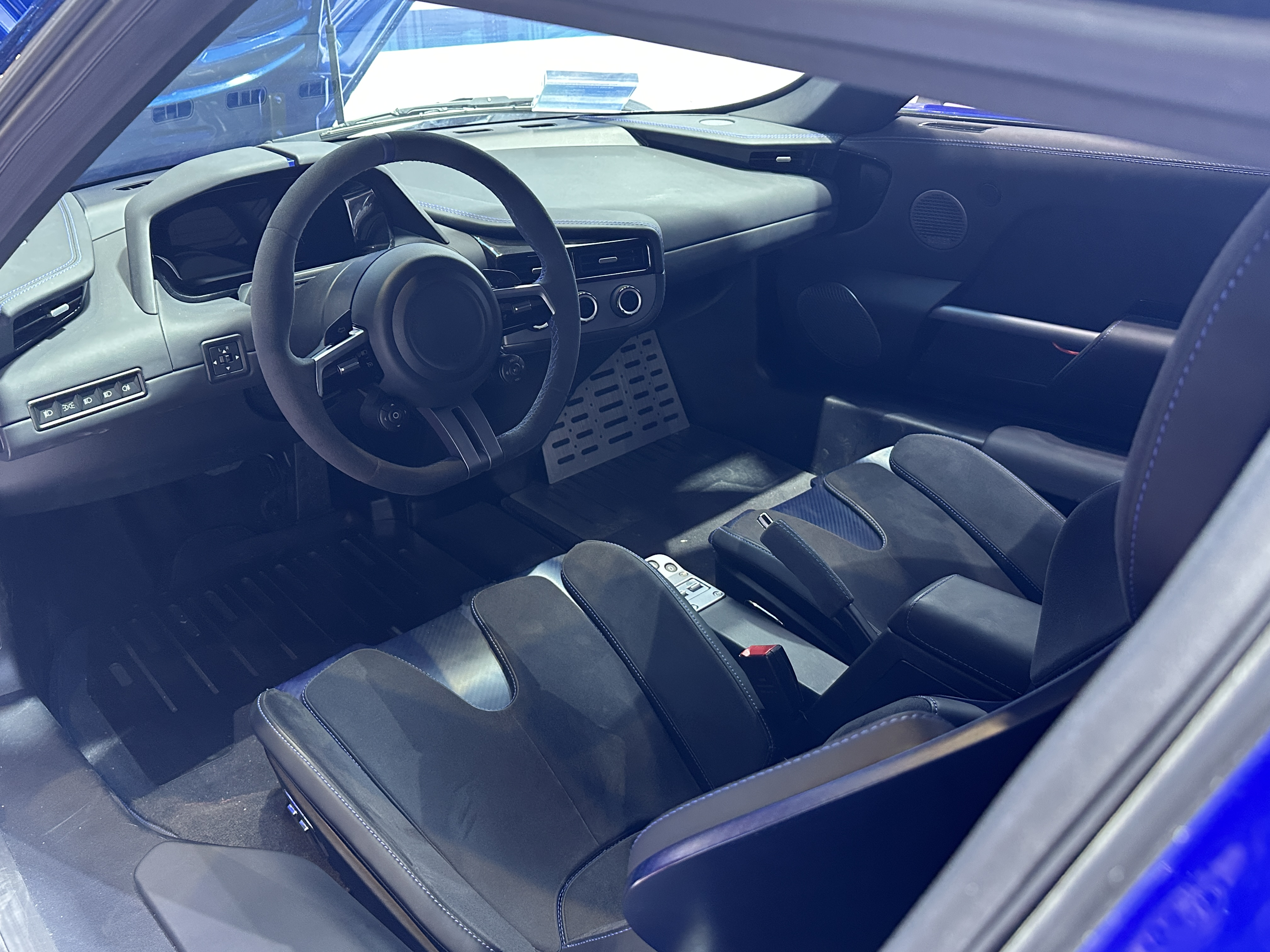
Interior

Rear cargo view.

The SC01 is a small two-seater coupe sports car, which falls into the compact car class at 4,106 mm (161.7 in) long. Its front bumper contains a front license plate holder and two side vents on the corners which act as air curtains, as well as an open LED headlight and daytime running light which is surrounded by air ducts used to cool the brakes. The low, forward-opening hood leads up to an abnormally rounded windshield to reduce drag, which uses only a single windshield wiper. The sides of the vehicle have an air intake vent located between the door and rear wheel, which is used supply cool air to radiators; the air then exits around the circular taillights. The area behind the passenger compartment has buttresses concealing the vertical rear window, allowing for a flat rear deck with a top opening trunk. The trunk is shaped like a deep well and provides about 170 L (6.0 cu ft) of luggage space.� The buttresses have mounting points for modifications such as a rear wing. The SC01 is available with personalized body paint colors.

The interior of the SC01 features a large LCD instrument cluster display behind the steering wheel, and lacks a separate center infotainment display. The flat-bottomed three-spoke steering wheel has several controls mounted on the horizontal spokes, including turn indicators, horn, and windshield wipers, as well as two separate control pods mounted low off the center hub which are responsible for media controls and screen navigation. Headlight controls are found to the left of the wheel, while dials for major HVAC functions are the only controls found on the dashboard to the right of the steering wheel. The center console is narrow and contains the drive selector buttons, a mechanical handbrake lever and power window controls. All other controls are found in a strip of buttons and dials mounted on the ceiling above the windshield, including the ignition button, volume knob, windshield wipers, door locks, trunk release, traction control settings, drive power configuration, and more. The SC01 is equipped with forged carbon fiber racing-style bucket seats with cutouts to allow for a multi-point harness. The arrangement of the two seats is asymmetrical: the driver’s seat is shifted 6 cm toward the center of the car for better driver positioning, resulting in reduced space on the passenger side. It has an Edifier sound system, with a claimed dual-channel three-way configuration.

The chassis of the SC01 consists of a 4130 chrome-molybdenum steel tube space frame to save weight, allowing for a curb weight of 1,365 kilograms (3,009 lb); the gross vehicle weight rating is 1,615 kilograms (3,560 lb). It uses a horizontal pushrod suspension system with compression and rebound adjustable shock absorbers, along with forged 7075 aluminum steering knuckles. It has a wheelbase of 2,503 mm (98.5 in), and the front and rear tracks measure 1,580 mm (62.2 in). It has approach and departure angles of 10 degrees and 16 degrees, respectively. It uses 350 mm (13.8 in) diameter brake discs, with six-piston calipers at the front and four-piston calipers on the rear axle. It has 5.9-kilogram (13 lb) magnesium alloy 18-inch wheels equipped with Michelin Pilot Sport Cup2 245/40 ZR18 tires, or optionally Vitour Tempesta Enzo V-01R racing tires. Rather than using the common skateboard platform design, the battery pack is mounted directly behind the passenger compartment. This placement is similar to the engine in a rear-mid engine vehicle, and allows for similar weight distribution, handling characteristics, and seating position. It has a center of gravity height of 380 mm (15.0 in), which is claimed to be similar to a GT3 race car.

== Powertrain ==
The 01 is powered by two Enpower-supplied permanent magnet synchronous motors with a peak output of 160 kW (215 hp; 218 PS) and a rated power of 70 kW (94 hp; 95 PS), one per axle in a dual-motor all-wheel drive configuration for a total of 429 hp (320 kW; 435 PS) and 560 N⋅m (413 lb⋅ft) of torque. Power is supplied by an approximately 60 kWh NMC battery pack supplied by CALB, capable of a peak output of 360 kW and an energy density of 160 Wh/kg. This allows for a CLTC range rating of 520 kilometres (323 mi) and claimed 30‍–‍80% charge time under 25 minutes. It has a top speed of 200 km/h (124 mph) and a 0–100 km/h (62 mph) time of 2.9 seconds.

== Configurable suspension ==
According to development-test driver Wang Yue, SC01's suspension is highly configurable.

- The ride height can be adjusted by changing the pushrod length. This can be achieved by rotating the rod with a wrench. This does not alter the pre-load or length of the spring.
- The spring preload can also be adjusted to change the ride height.
  - By varying both mechanisms, ride height can be held constant while experimenting with different preload/pushrod-length combinations.
- The camber can be adjusted by adding shims on the steering knuckle. This is similar to the 911's camber shims on the lower control arms, but unlike the 911, these shims are included with the car.
  - The camber adjustment range is claimed to be "very large" and is "sufficient for tires of any grip". By lowering the ride height and removing all shims, the camber can reach -7° to -8°.
  - The adjustment is made at the steering knuckle, allowing camber adjustment without changing the control arm length. This avoids the side effect of also changing the camber gain.
- The pitch angle of all 8 control arms can be tuned between 9 settings. This changes the car's anti-dive and anti-squat behaviors.
- The toe gain of front and rear wheels can be adjusted.
- The height of the toe link's outer end can be adjusted for the front and rear axles.
- The height of the toe link's inner end can be adjusted for the rear axle.
- The steering box height can be adjusted.
- The Ackermann angle can be adjusted by changing a small part. This ranges from pro- to anti-Ackermann settings.

== See also ==
- Caterham Project V
