= W6 =

W6 may refer to:

- W6 (tram), a class of electric trams built by the Melbourne & Metropolitan Tramways Board.
- a particular width for a structural steel I-beam
- a postcode district in the W postcode area
- Wizz Air (IATA code W6)
- 7th step of the W0-W6 scale for the classification of meteorites by weathering
- W6 (loading gauge) on the British rail network
- Weltmeister W6, a Chinese car

== See also ==
- 6W (disambiguation)
