= EX5 =

EX5 may refer to:

== Vehicles ==
=== Automobiles ===
- BJEV EX5, a 2019–present Chinese compact electric SUV
- EVeasy EX5, a 2019–present Chinese subcompact electric SUV
- Geely EX5, a 2024–present Chinese compact electric SUV
- Weltmeister EX5, a 2018–present Chinese compact electric SUV

=== Motorcycles ===
- Honda EX5, a 1958–present Japanese underbone motorcycle

== Other uses ==
- Yamaha EX5, a synthesizer/workstation
