= Weltmeister M7 =

Electric mid-size concept sedan

Overview
- Manufacturer: WM Motor
- Production: 2022
- Assembly: Wenzhou, China

Body and chassis
- Class: Mid-size car
- Body style: 4-door sedan
- Layout: Front-motor, all-wheel-drive

Powertrain
- Electric motor: Permanent Magnet Synchronous Motor
- Power output: 218 hp (221 PS; 163 kW)
- Transmission: 1-speed direct-drive
- Battery: 89 kWh (320 MJ)
- Electric range: 700 km (435.0 mi)

Dimensions
- Wheelbase: 2,918 mm (114.9 in)
- Length: 4,930 mm (194.1 in)

The Weltmeister M7 is a battery electric mid-size sedan that is developed by the Chinese NEV manufacturer WM Motor (Chinese: 威马汽车) under the brand Weltmeister.

== Overview ==
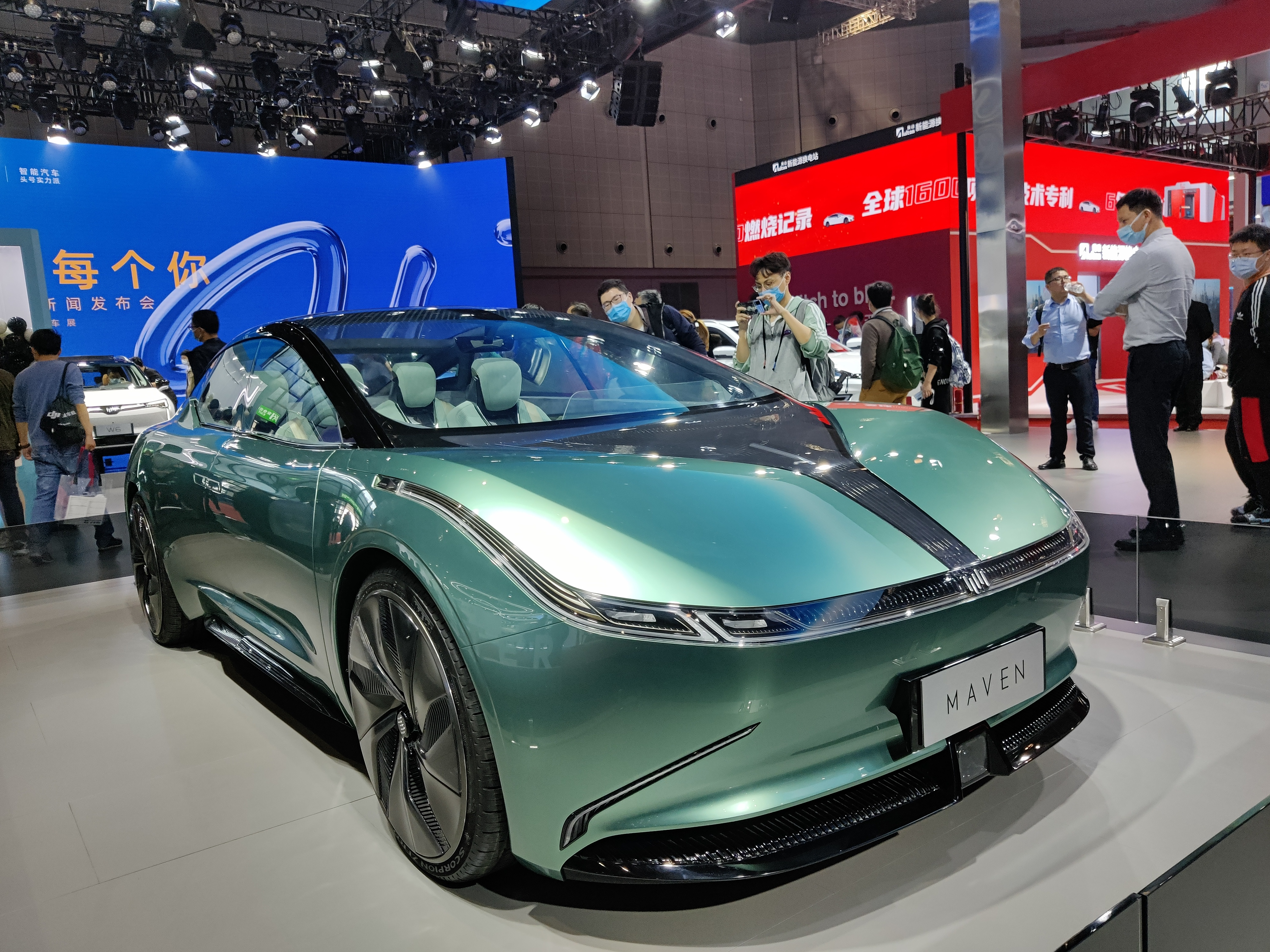
Weltmeister Maven Concept front

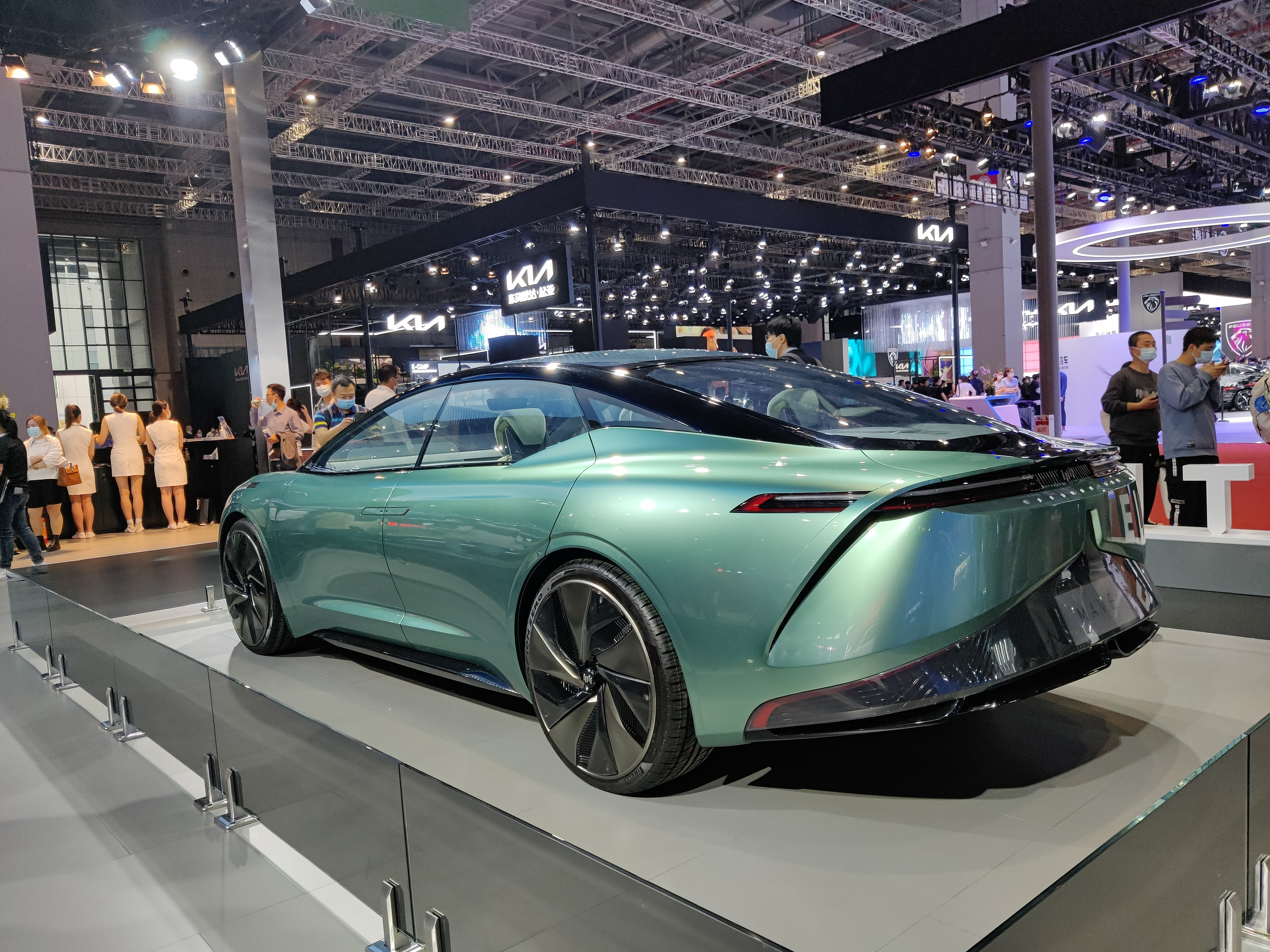
Weltmeister Maven Concept rear

In May 2020, the Chinese company WM Motor presented a prototype of its first flagship electric limousine in the form of the Weltmeister Maven Concept, with plans to implement it into production next year. The production car called Weltmeister M7 was presented in November 2021.

A characteristic solution for the M7 was an extensive package of sensors and cameras, which enabled achieving advanced level four of semi-autonomous driving. In addition to 32 sensors located throughout the body, three LiDAR radars located on the front edge of the roof are particularly visible, ensuring continuous monitoring and scanning of the surroundings. The manufacturer claims that the M7 is ready to provide movement closest to the requirements of fully autonomous driving.

The M7 was planned to be built by Weltmeister exclusively for the domestic Chinese market, where its sales was originally planned to began by the end of 2022, while production was never launched due to Weltmeister's financial crisis at the time.

== Specifications ==
The M7 is a fully electric car powered by an engine transmitting power to both axles. The battery with a capacity of 98 kWh allows the user to travel approximately 700 km (430 mi) on one charge.
