= Weltmeister EX6 =

Electric mid-size crossover SUV

EX6 Plus
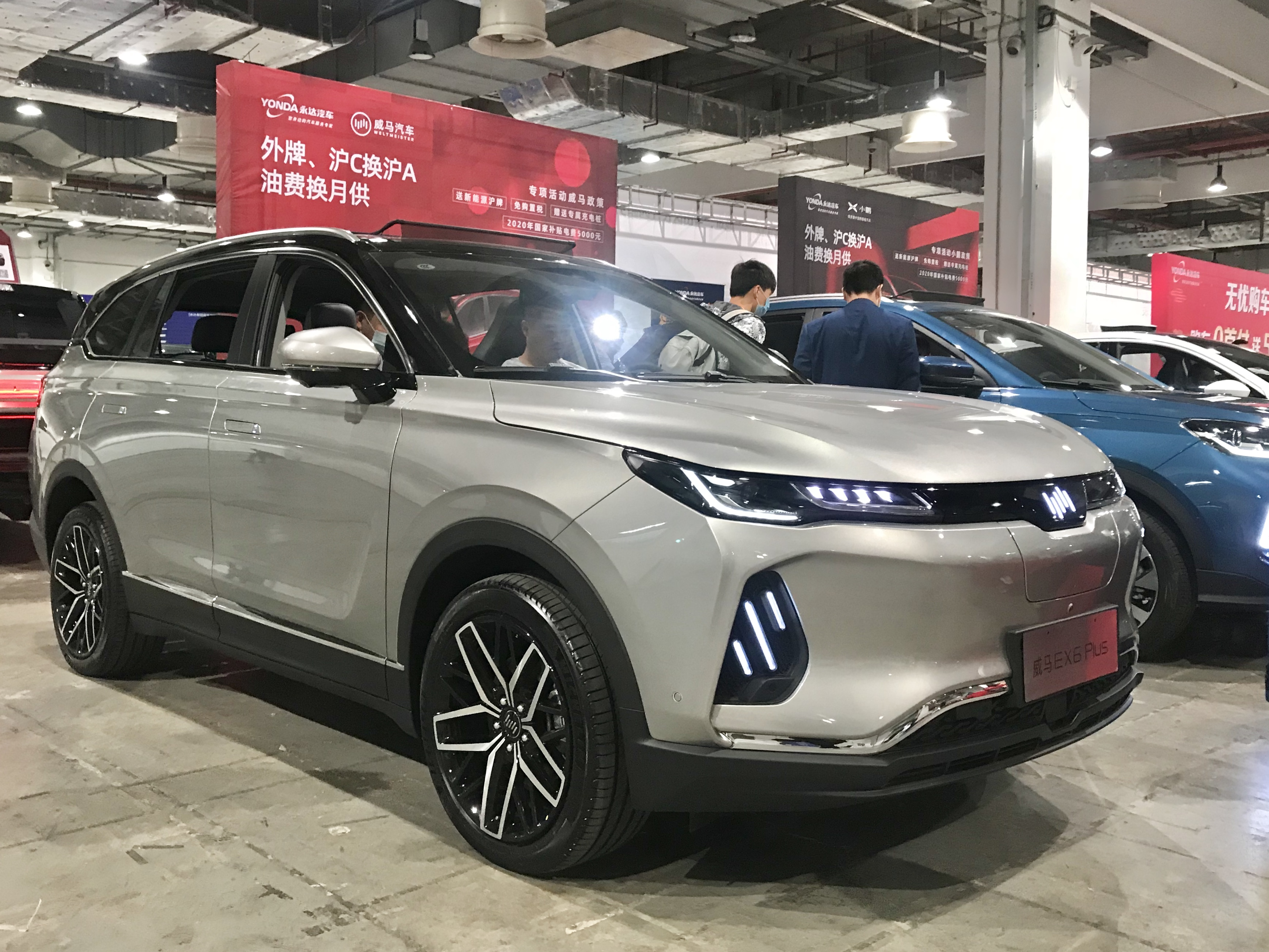

Overview
- Manufacturer: WM Motor
- Production: 2019–2022
- Assembly: China: Wenzhou

Body and chassis
- Class: Mid-size crossover SUV
- Body style: 5-door SUV

Powertrain
- Electric motor: Permanent Magnet Synchronous Motor
- Power output: 160 kW (214 hp; 217 PS)
- Transmission: 1-speed direct-drive
- Battery: 52.5 kWh (189 MJ), 69 kWh (250 MJ)
- Electric range: 408 km (253.5 mi) & 505 km (313.8 mi)

Dimensions
- Wheelbase: 2,715 mm (106.9 in)
- Length: 4,802 mm (189.1 in)
- Width: 1,839 mm (72.4 in)
- Height: 1,710 mm (67.3 in)

The WM Motor (Weltmeister) EX6 is a battery electric mid-size crossover SUV that is manufactured by the Chinese NEV manufacturer WM Motor (Chinese: 威马汽车) under the brand Weltmeister. The model was first revealed as the Weltmeister EX6 Limited pre-production model during the 2019 Shanghai Auto Show. The Weltmeister EX6 Limited is based on the EX6 concept car, and it is previewing the second model from Weltmeister Motor. The EX6 is available in 5-seater and 6-seater layouts. Deliveries of the first units to customers began a year after the market debut, in May 2020, in the next 6 months ending with a relatively low level of 259 models sold and finally disappearing from the market in 2022.

== Overview ==
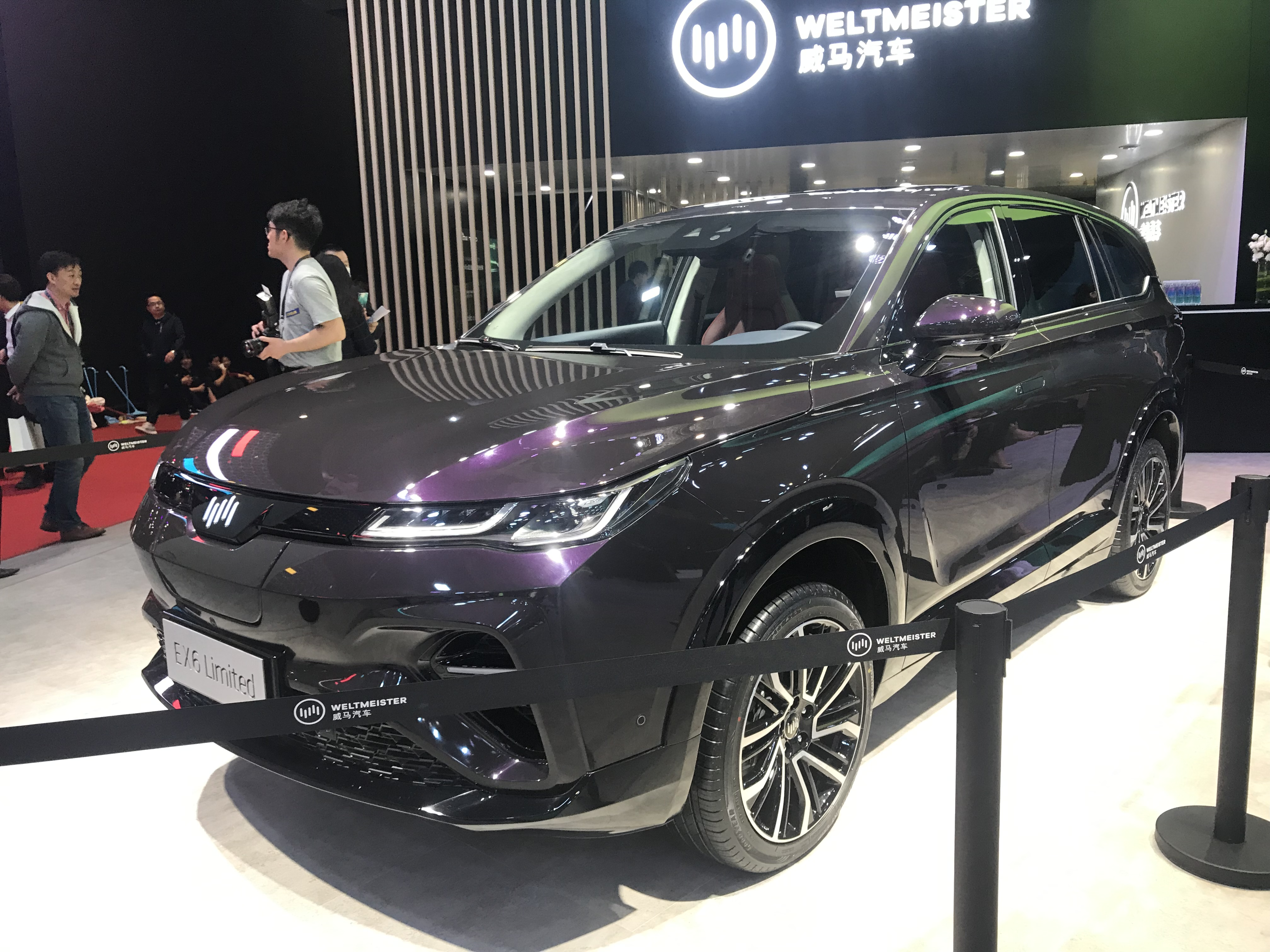
WM Motor EX6 Limited front

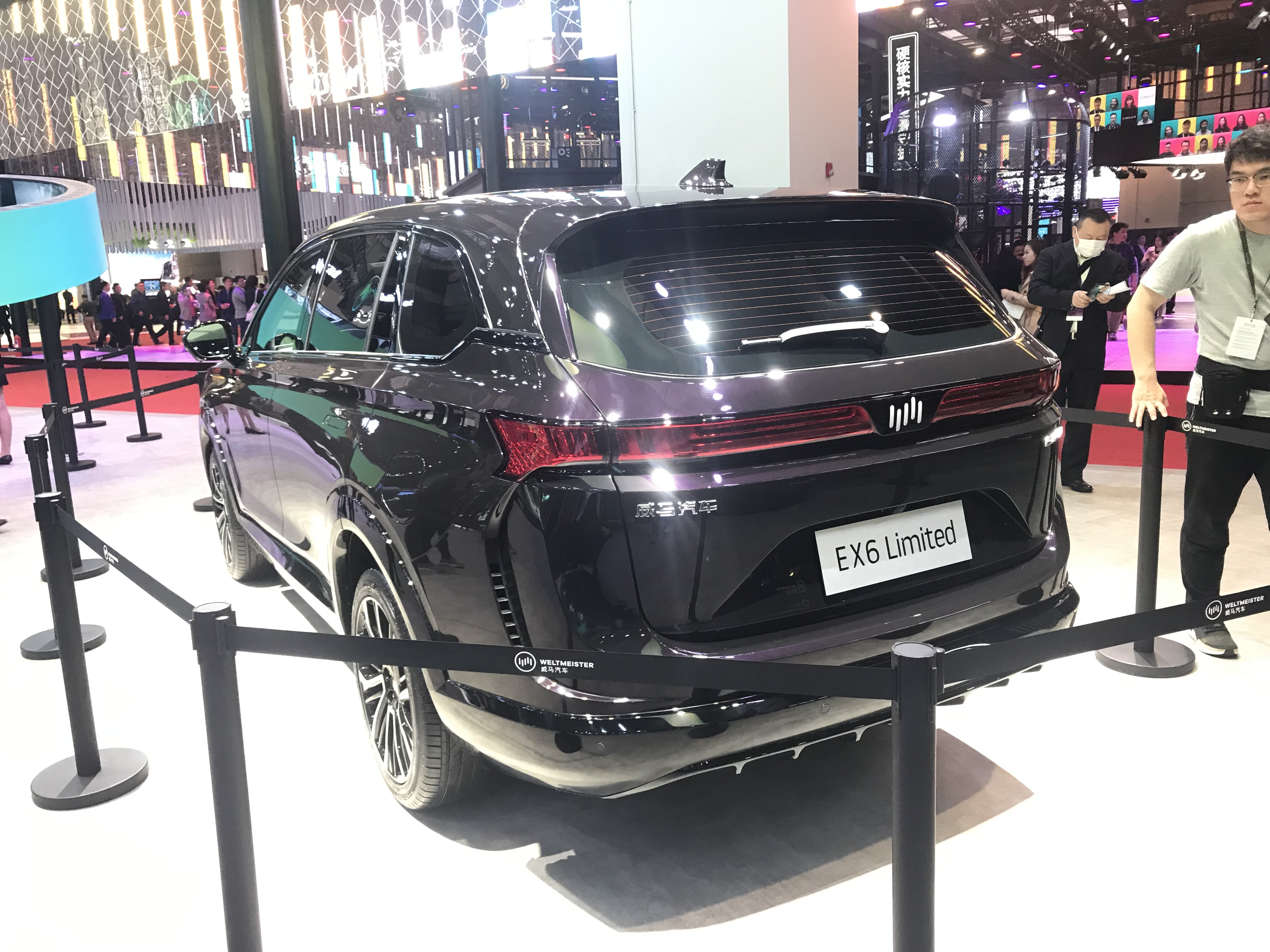
WM Motor EX6 Limited rear

The Weltmeister EX6 Limited prototype revealed in 2019 has a dimension of 4,851 mm (191.0 in) by 1,835 mm (72.2 in) by 1,724 mm (67.9 in) which was different from the later revealed EX6 Plus, and is powered by BorgWarner integrated electric drive system with a maximum power output of 214 horsepower (160 kW; 217 PS), and a torque of 315 newton-metres (232 lb⋅ft; 32 kg⋅m). The EX6 is equipped with Weltmeister Motor's second-generation power battery unit allowing a cruising range of 500 kilometres (310 mi).

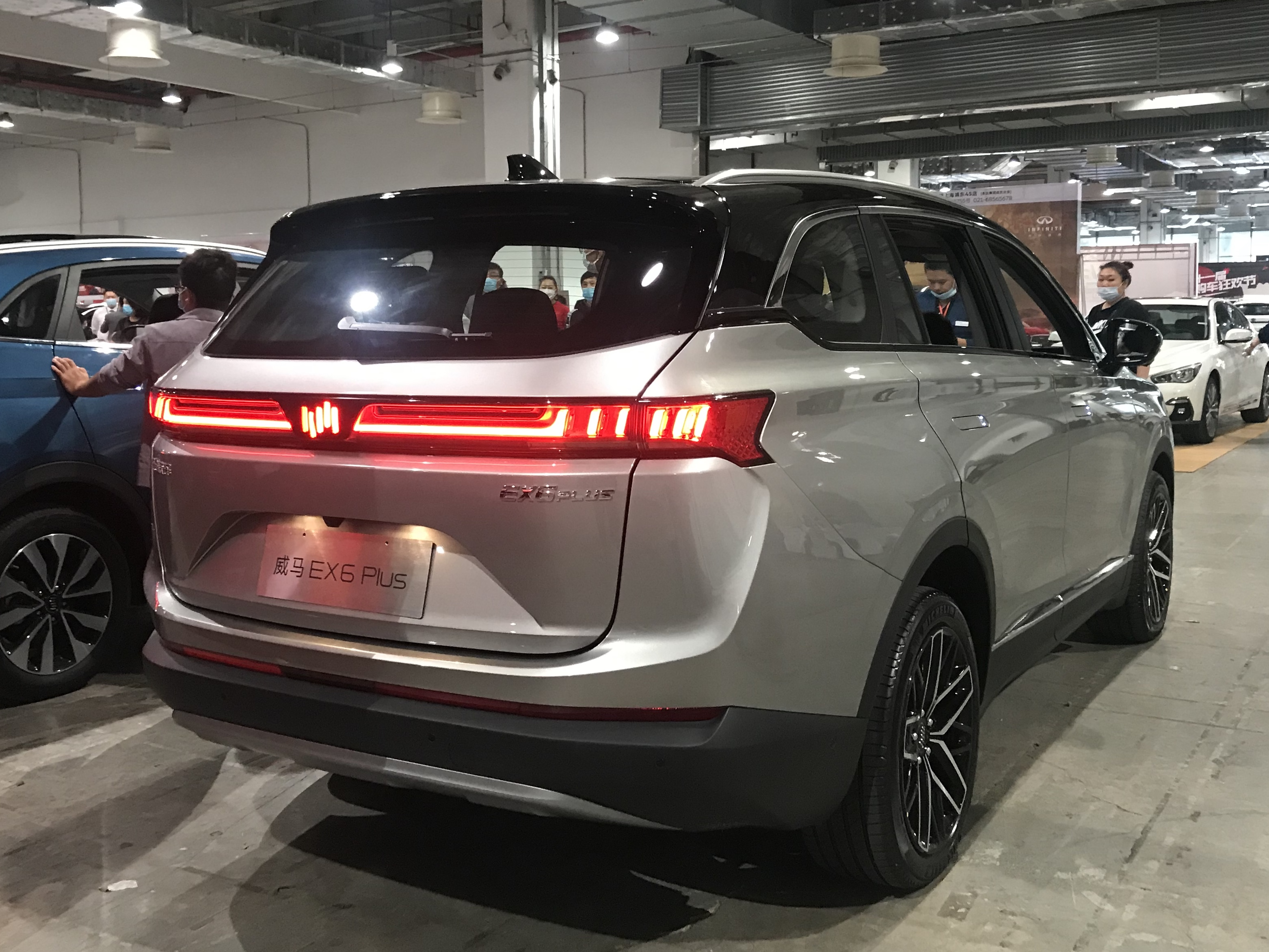
WM Motor EX6 Plus rear

The Weltmeister EX6 Plus production version made its debut at the 2019 Guangzhou Auto Show. It is available in 2 different variants with 2 different range of 408 and 505 kilometres (254 and 314 mi) respectively. Pricing ranges from 239,900 yuan to 289,900 yuan.

There are five variants of the EX6 Plus excluding the founders edition, the EX6 Plus 400 Arctic, EX6 Plus 500 Arctic, EX6 Plus Nex, EX6 Plus Pro, and the EX6 Plus 400 entry version. The EX6 Plus 400 Arctic and EX6 Plus 400 entry version are both equipped with a 54 kWh (190 MJ) battery that provides 408 kilometres (254 mi) NEDC range. The EX6 Plus 500 Arctic and the founders edition is equipped with a 69 kWh (250 MJ) battery and achieves 505 kilometres (314 mi) NEDC range. In all EX6 variants, WM Motor uses 160 kW (218 PS; 215 bhp) electric drive modules supplied by BorgWarner that can provide up to 315 N⋅m (232 lb⋅ft; 32 kg⋅m) of torque.

WM Motor supplies a 6.6 kW, 220V home charger that can fully charge the EX6 in 9 to 11.5 hours. Charging from 30% to 80% takes 30 minutes when using 120 kW DC fast chargers.

== Sales ==
Year	China
2020	259
2021	110
2022	6
