= Weltmeister E5 =

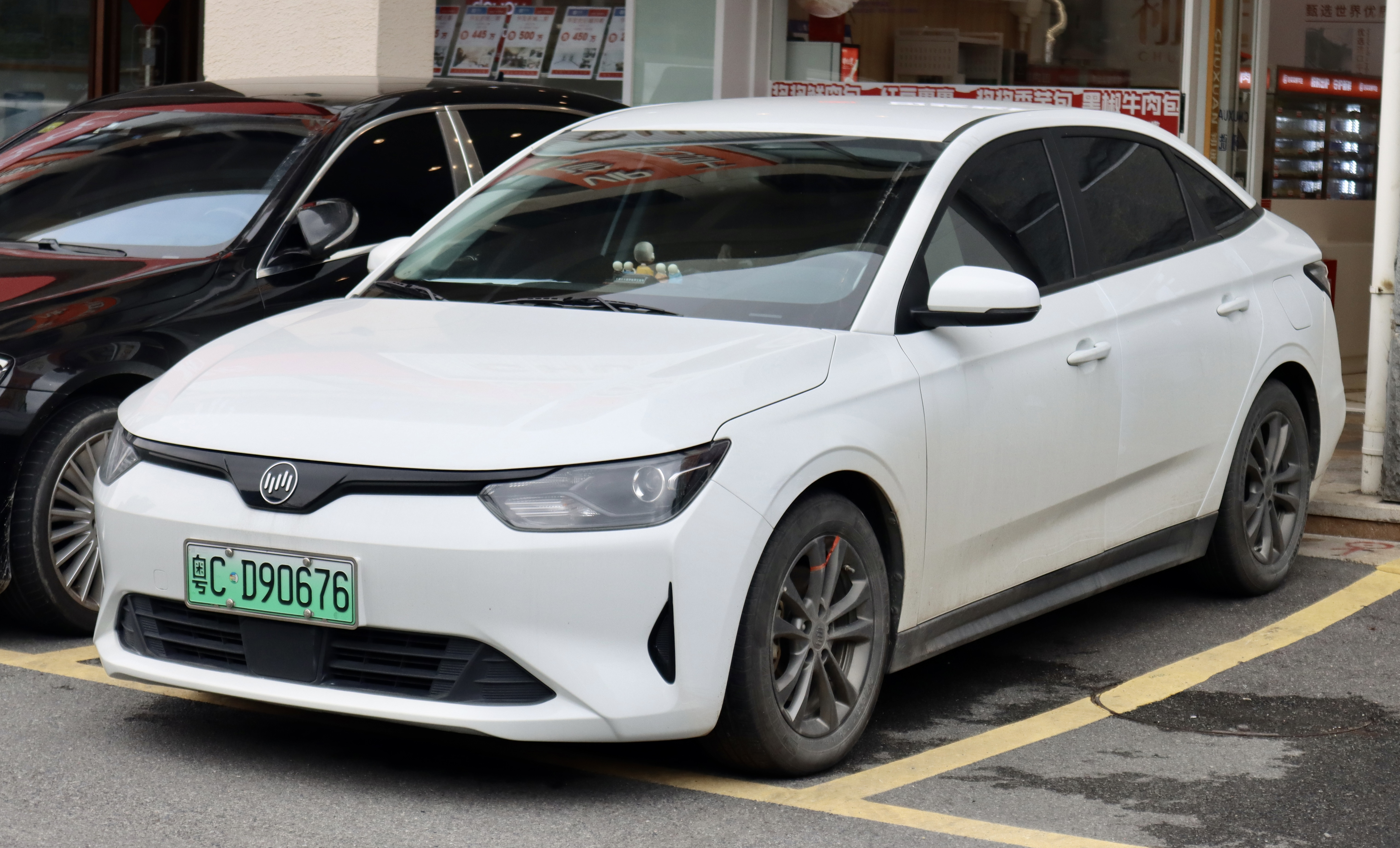

Overview
- Manufacturer: WM Motor
- Production: 2021–2022
- Assembly: China: Wenzhou

Body and chassis
- Class: Compact car (C)
- Body style: 4-door sedan

Powertrain
- Electric motor: Permanent Magnet Synchronous Motor
- Power output: 122 kW (163 hp; 165 PS)
- Transmission: 1-speed direct-drive
- Battery: 58.6 kWh (211 MJ)
- Electric range: 505 km (313.8 mi)

Dimensions
- Wheelbase: 2,810 mm (110.6 in)
- Length: 4,718 mm (185.7 in)
- Width: 1,838 mm (72.4 in)
- Height: 1,535 mm (60.4 in)
- Kerb weight: 1,649 kg (3,635 lb)

The Weltmeister E5 is a battery electric compact sedan that is manufactured by the Chinese NEV manufacturer WM Motor (Chinese: 威马汽车) under the brand Weltmeister. The E5 is the first product of the economy E series products of Weltmeister, which is a series of products built for entry level budget buyers and ride hailing services.

== Overview ==
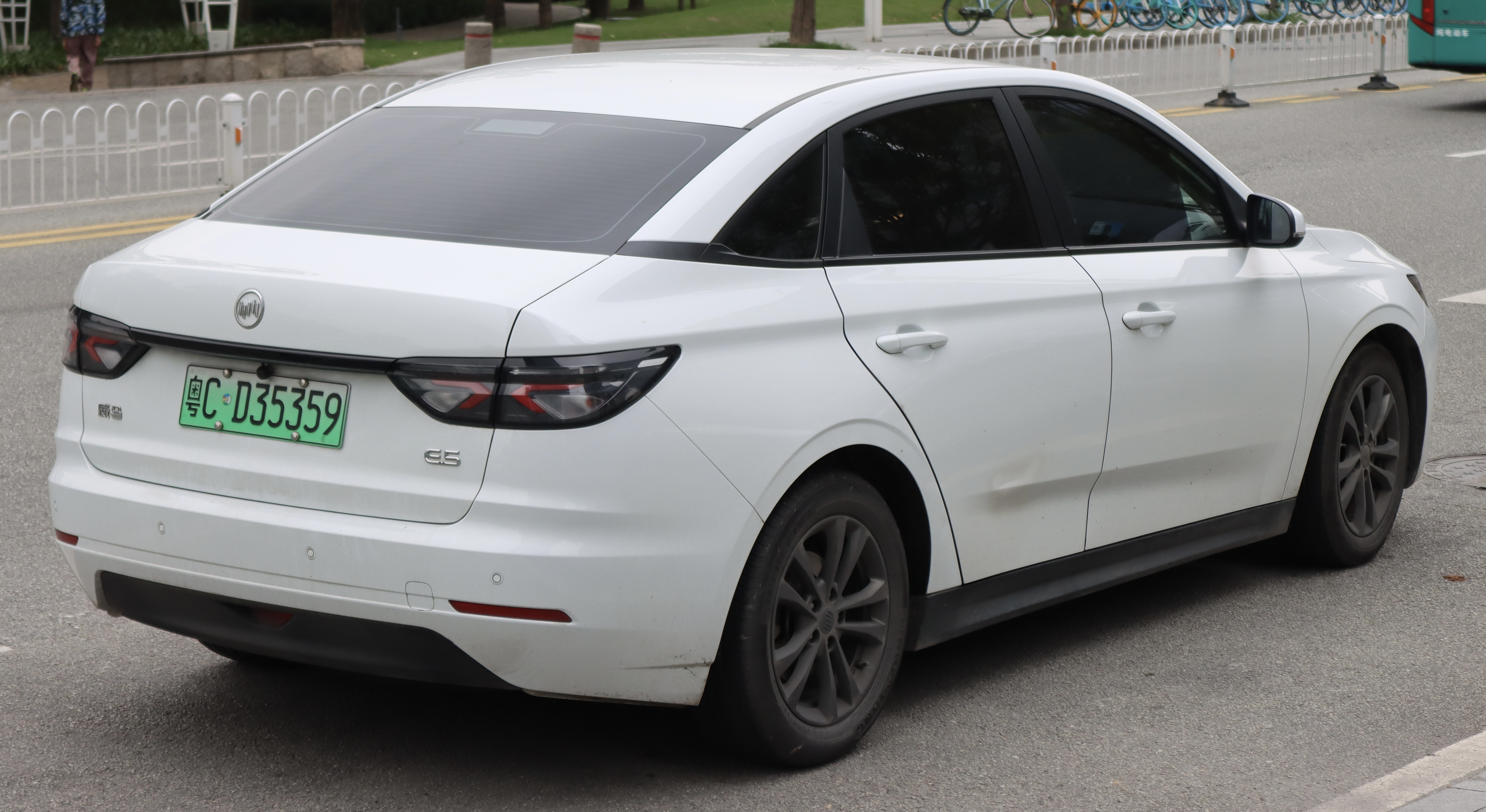
Weltmeister E5 rear

The design of the Weltmeister E5 is based on a simplified platform with MacPherson struts at the front and twist-beam rear suspension, with standard wheels being 17 inches. The interior equipment is focused on taxis and rental services, with no multimedia system in the cabin. In the place where the screen is connected, a USB connector for connecting gadgets is the only feature with no buttons on the steering wheel. The air conditioning is a single-zone climate control with hardware buttons and knobs. In a more upmarket configuration, a 12.3-inch multimedia system screen, leatherette seat upholstery and a panoramic roof is offered.

The Weltmeister E5 has a 163-horsepower (122 kW; 165 PS) electric motor and 240 N⋅m (177 lb⋅ft; 24 kg⋅m), powering the front wheels. The lithium-ion traction battery has a capacity of 58.6 kWh (211 MJ), and the maximum mileage on one charge is 505 kilometres (314 mi) according to the NEDC cycle. Maximum speed of the E5 is 170 kilometres per hour (110 mph), acceleration time from 0–100 km/h (0–62 mph) is at 8.9 seconds.

== Sales ==
Year	China
2021	12,121
2022	18,780
