= 6W =

6W or 6-W may refer to:

== Units of measurement ==
- 6°W, or 6th meridian west, a longitude coordinate
- 6 watts
- 6 weeks
- 6 wins, abbreviated in a Win–loss record (pitching)

== Other ==
- 6W, IATA code for Saravia
- Dublin 6W, see List of Dublin postal districts
- 06W, a designation for Typhoon Ora (1972)
- 6W, the production code for the 1985 Doctor Who serial The Two Doctors
- 6w (locomotive), a type of locomotive under the Whyte notation

== See also ==
- W6 (disambiguation)
