= Jannarelly Design-1 =

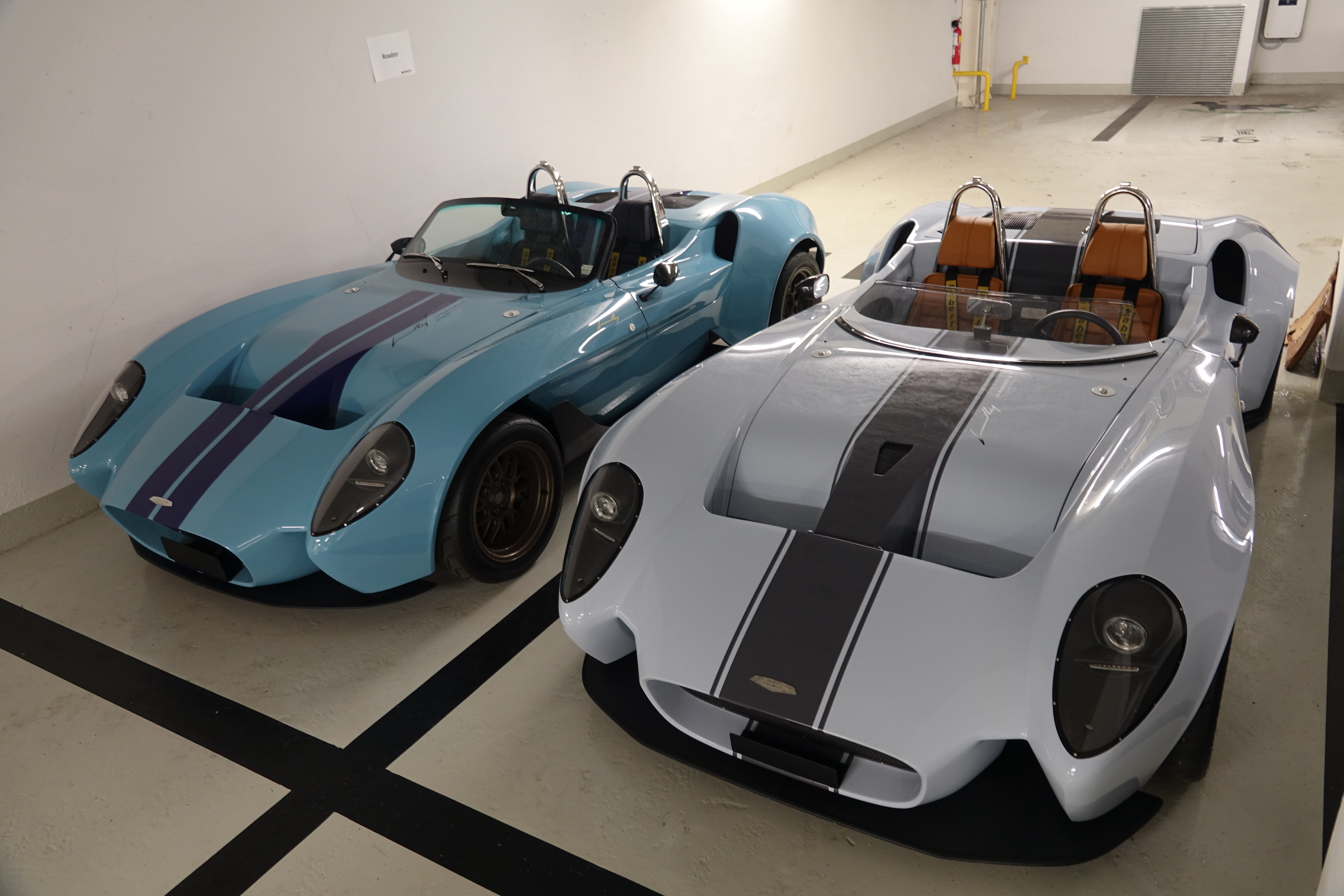

Overview
- Manufacturer: Jannarelly
- Production: 2016–present
- Assembly: Dubai, Dubai, United Arab Emirates
- Designer: Anthony Jannarelly

Body and chassis
- Class: Sports car (S)
- Body style: 2-door Roadster (Trackday & lifestyle); 2-door Hardtop coupe (Touring)
- Layout: Mid-engine, rear-wheel drive

Powertrain
- Engine: 3.5 L Nissan VQ35HR V6
- Power output: 325 hp (242 kW)
- Transmission: 6-speed manual

Dimensions
- Wheelbase: 2,425 mm (95.5 in)
- Length: 3,860 mm (152.0 in)
- Width: 1,840 mm (72.4 in)
- Height: 1,080 mm (42.5 in)
- Kerb weight: 750–850 kg (1,650–1,870 lb)

The Jannarelly Design-1 is the first vehicle produced by the French-Emirati automaker Jannarelly since 2016.

== Presentation ==
The Design-1 is a roadster with central rear mid-engine and rear-wheel drive. It is built in Dubai by the French manufacturer Jannarelly and its production is limited to 499 copies. Its design is similar to roadsters of the 1960s like the AC Cobra.

== Technical characteristics ==
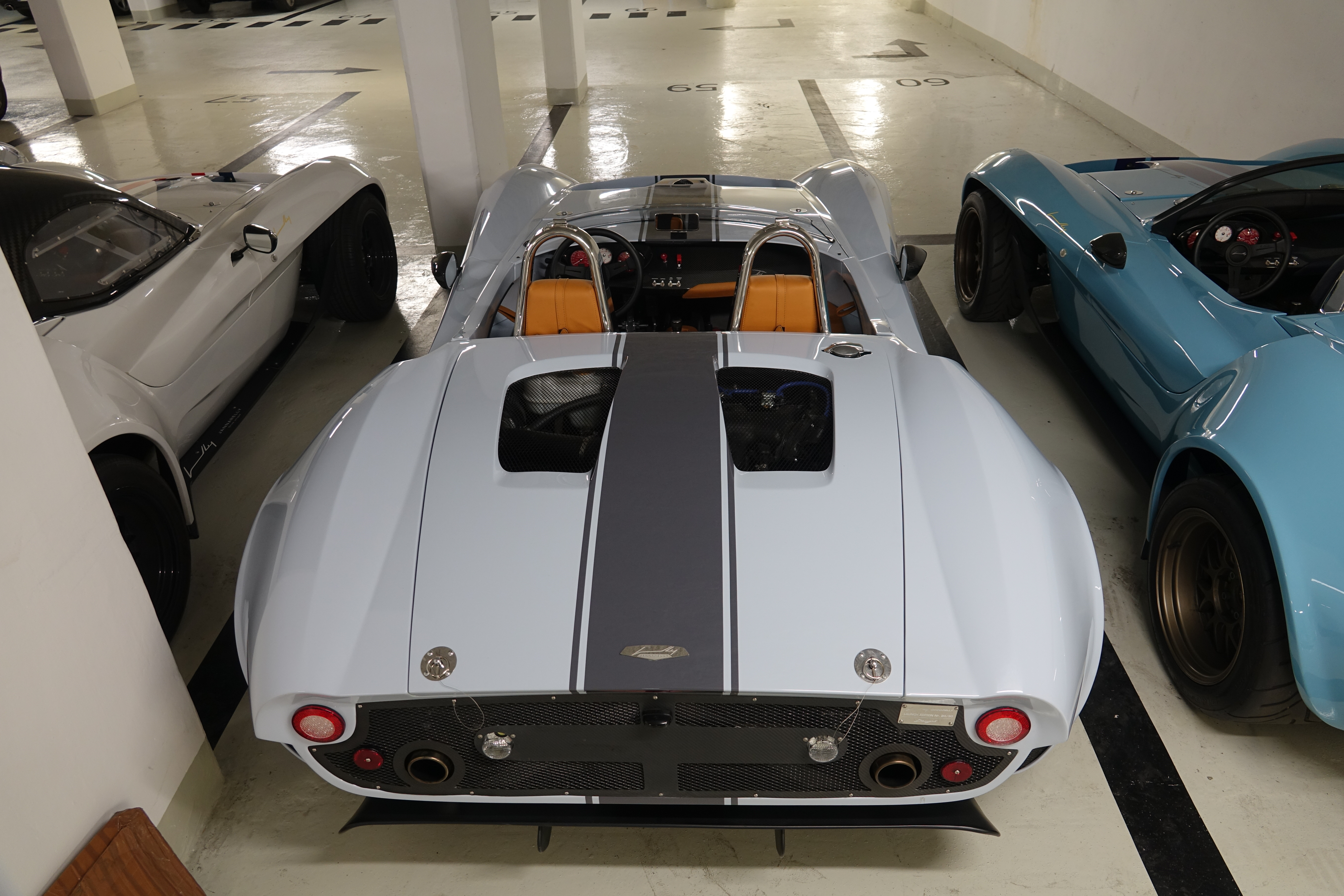
Jannarelly Design-1

The Design-1 rests on a tubular steel and aluminum chassis, covered with a carbon fiber and/or fiberglass body. The Jannarelly Design-1 can receive a removable hard carbon roof (painted or visible carbon) to transform the roadster into a coupe.

The 3 versions available are:

- Trackday, roadster with a simple windscreen;
- Lifestyle, roadster with windshield;
- Touring, roadster with its hardtop.

The Design-1 inherits the latest generation of the V6 3.5 engine from the Nissan 350Z, providing 325 hp (242 kW) and 371 N⋅m (274 lb⋅ft) of torque.
