= Weltmeister (marque) =

Chinese electric car brand owned by WM Motor Technology Co Ltd

- Type: company
- Industry: Automotive
- Founded: 2015; 11 years ago
- Founder: Shen Hui, Du Ligang, Lu Bin
- Headquarters: Shanghai City, People's Republic of China
- Key people: Shen Hui (Chairman, President); Du Ligang (Executive Vice Chairman); Lu Bin (Senior Vice President)
- Website: www.wm-motor.com

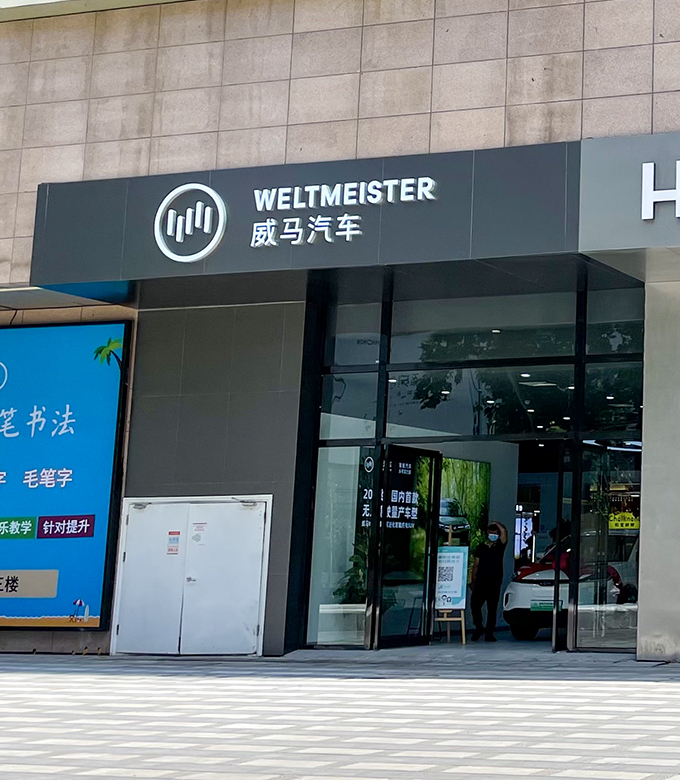
Weltmeister showroom in Zhengzhou, China

Weltmeister (Chinese: 威马汽车) is a Chinese electric car brand owned by WM Motor Technology Co Ltd, a Shanghai-based automotive company which specialises in the creation of battery electric vehicles (BEVs). It launched its first production car, the EX5 in May 2018 at the Beijing Auto Show, with deliveries starting in September 2018. WM investors include Chinese technology companies Baidu and Tencent. Weltmeister vehicles are manufactured at WM Motor's manufacturing facility in Wenzhou, Zhejiang Province, which has an annual capacity of 100,000 units. WM Motor also maintains R&D facilities in China, Germany and the United States. In October 2023, WM Motor filed for pre-restructuring bankruptcy as the company struggled for cash.

== History ==
=== Beginnings ===
Weltmeister logo since 2017

In January 2015, Freeman Shen, former manager of Geely Automobile and former president of the Chinese branch of Volvo, founded startup WM Motor Technology. His goal was to put on sale self-built electric cars competitive with similar, short-lived Chinese startups working on vehicles with new propulsion sources. The startup's investors included Chinese technology giants such as Baidu and Tencent. In November 2016, WM Motor launched its first production plant in Wenzhou in Zhejiang province. In January 2018, before the premiere of the first vehicle, a Chinese company has started building a second factory in the city of Huanggang in Hubei province.

=== Brand Weltmeister ===
Official premiere of the first car, along with the announcement of the "Weltmeister" brand, under which WM Motor products will be offered, took place in May 2018. The EX5 model took the form of an SUV with an electric drive, going into production and sale on the internal Chinese market at the end of 2018. In May 2019, during the Shanghai Auto Show, the manufacturer presented a study announcement of the next flagship model in the form of the Evolve Concept, as well as the second, this time production model - an electric SUV larger than the EX5 EX6.

In spring 2021, Weltmeister began the next stage of expanding its offer. The model range has been enriched with the mid-size SUV-a W6, and, moreover, WM Motor also announced plans to start the production of classic passenger vehicles. After the Maven prototype production sedan called E5 was presented. In November 2021, the offer was expanded by another classic sedan in the form of the M7.

=== Bankruptcy ===
In the second half of 2022, WM Motors found itself in a bad financial situation, which was caused by growing debt and losses recorded despite attempts to increase sales and product portfolio. As a result, the company was unable to put the flagship M7 model on sale, and moreover - it ended the production of all its existing models at the end of 2022, laid off staff and closed most sales points. The following year, the president of WM Motor started looking for new sources of financing and implemented a savings plan. These actions were unsuccessful, and as a result, in mid-October 2023, WM Motor announced bankruptcy. Freeman Shen indicated that the factors preventing the company from remaining on the market were the economic effects of the COVID-19 pandemic, stagnation of the capital market and the increase in raw material prices. The bankruptcy of the company led to radical difficulties for the current owners of Weltmeister. A day after the bankruptcy application was accepted by the Shanghai court, drivers lost access to the WM Motor mobile application, the website stopped working and contact with the support center disappeared, leaving after-sales and service support in question.

In January 2024, WM Motor announced that the court had accepted the company's application for pre-reorganization to reorganization.

=== Return to production ===
In September 2025, WM Motor had found a new owner, which later became the restructuring investor and also became the shareholder of the company's four entities. WM Motor will resume production of the E5 and EX5 in the same month and plans to return to full production capacity in 2026.

== Manufacturing ==
=== Wenzhou Plant ===
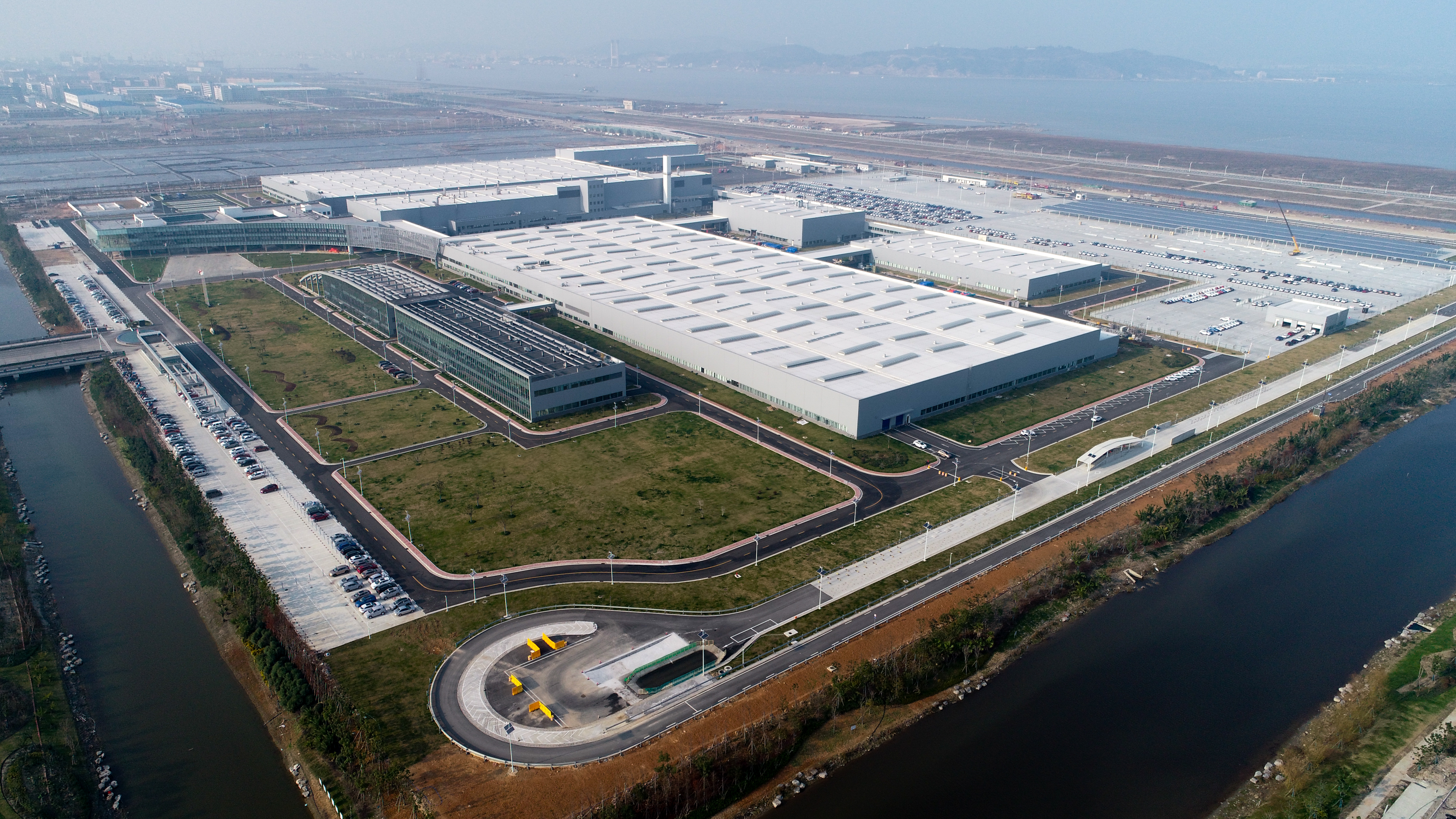
WM Motor's Wenzhou Plant has a site area of 650,000 sqm, and is currently operational. The plant currently has a maximum operating capacity of 100,000 units per year.

Wenzhou Plant has a site area of 650,000 sqm, and is currently operational. The plant currently has an operating capacity of 100,000 units per annum. Construction of the facility began in September 2016, and mass production commenced on 28 September 2018.

=== Huanggang Plant ===
WM Motor's second manufacturing facility in Huanggang, Hubei Province, was scheduled for completion in early 2020. Due the impact of the COVID-19 pandemic, it only produced 10,000 vehicles of its planned 2022 production capacity of 150,000.

== Mobile App - GETnGO ==
WM Motor operates a proprietary app called GETnGO (Chinese: 即客行), which is primarily aimed at offering search, navigation and payment options for public chargers in China. As of October 2019, the GETnGO app had registered 200,000 public chargers to the service through its partnerships with public charging providers, including the State Grid.

== Models ==
- Weltmeister E5 (2021–2022), an electric compact sedan
- Weltmeister EX5 (2018–2022), an electric compact SUV
- Weltmeister M7 (2022), an electric mid-size sedan
- Weltmeister EX6 (2019–2022), an electric mid-size SUV
- Weltmeister W6 (2021–2022), an electric compact SUV
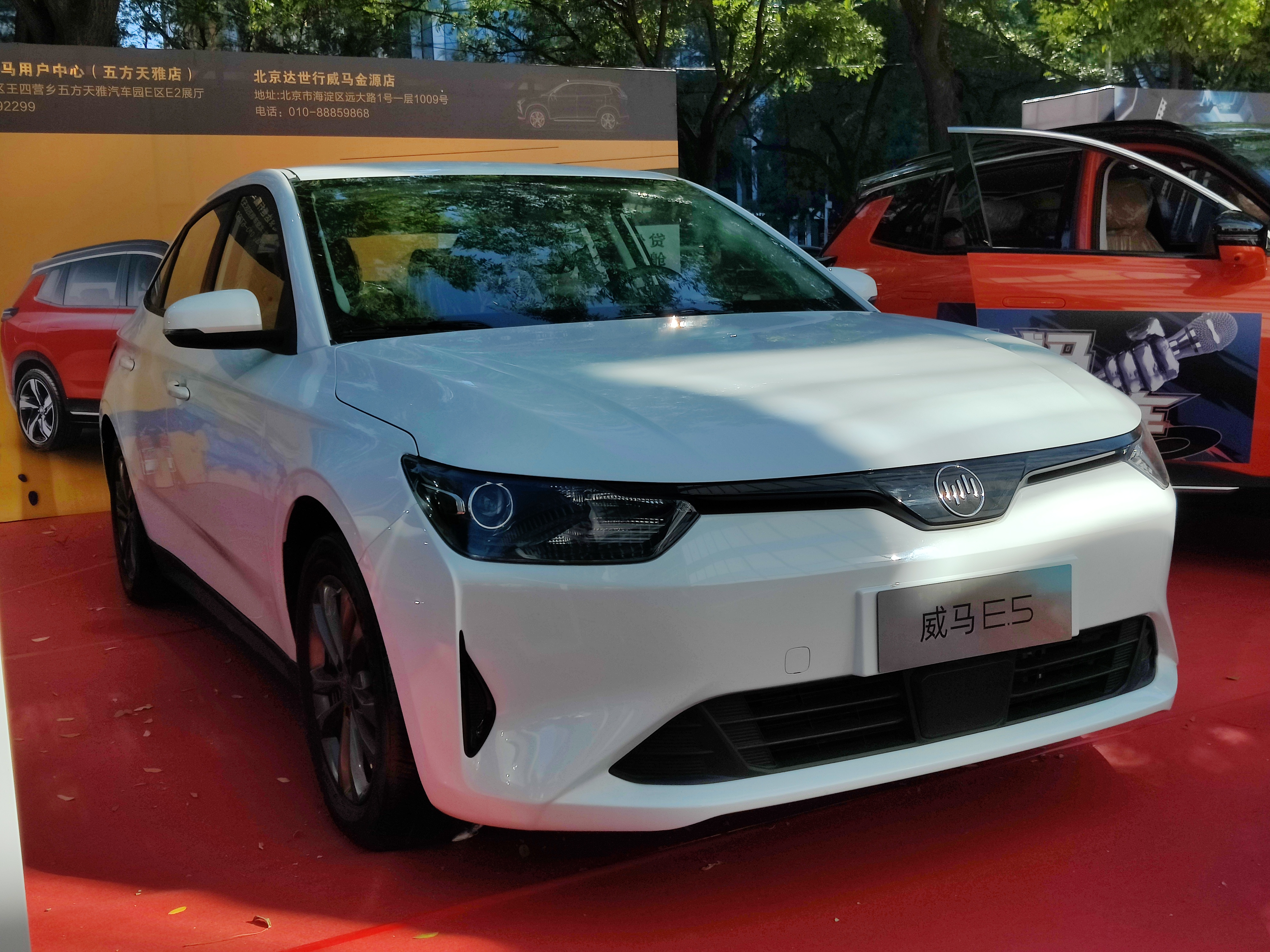
Weltmeister E5

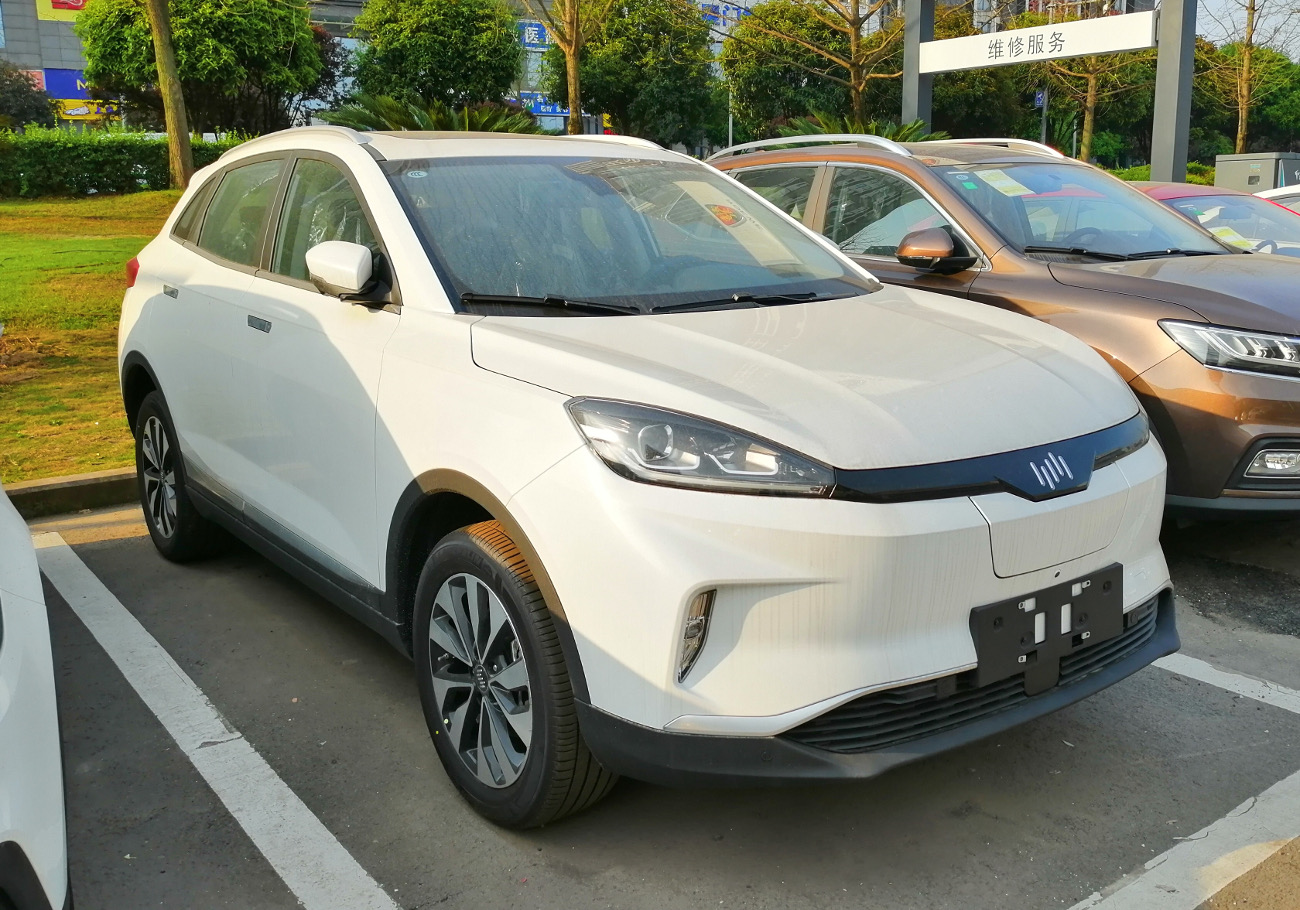
Weltmeister EX5

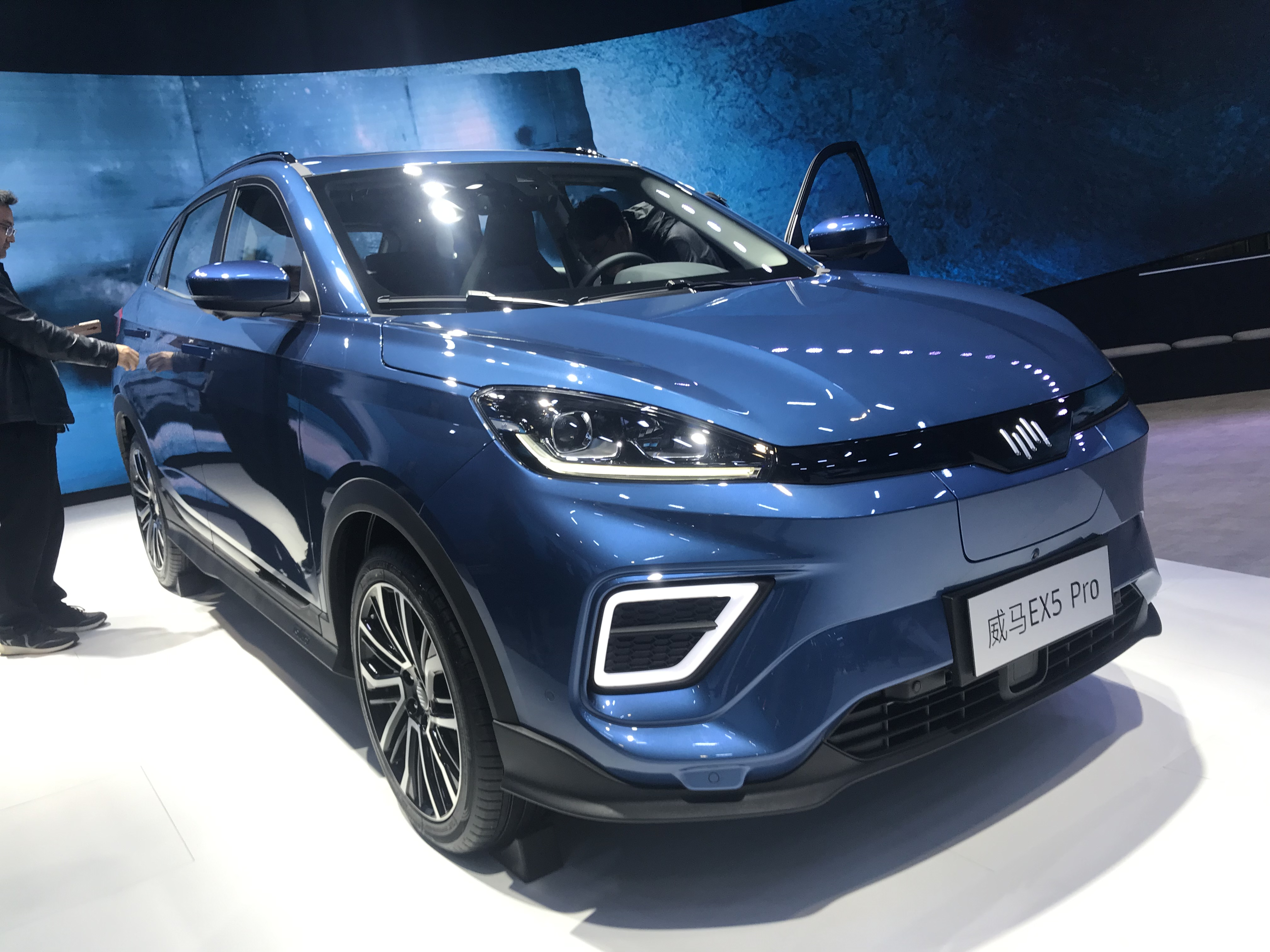
Weltmeister EX5 Pro

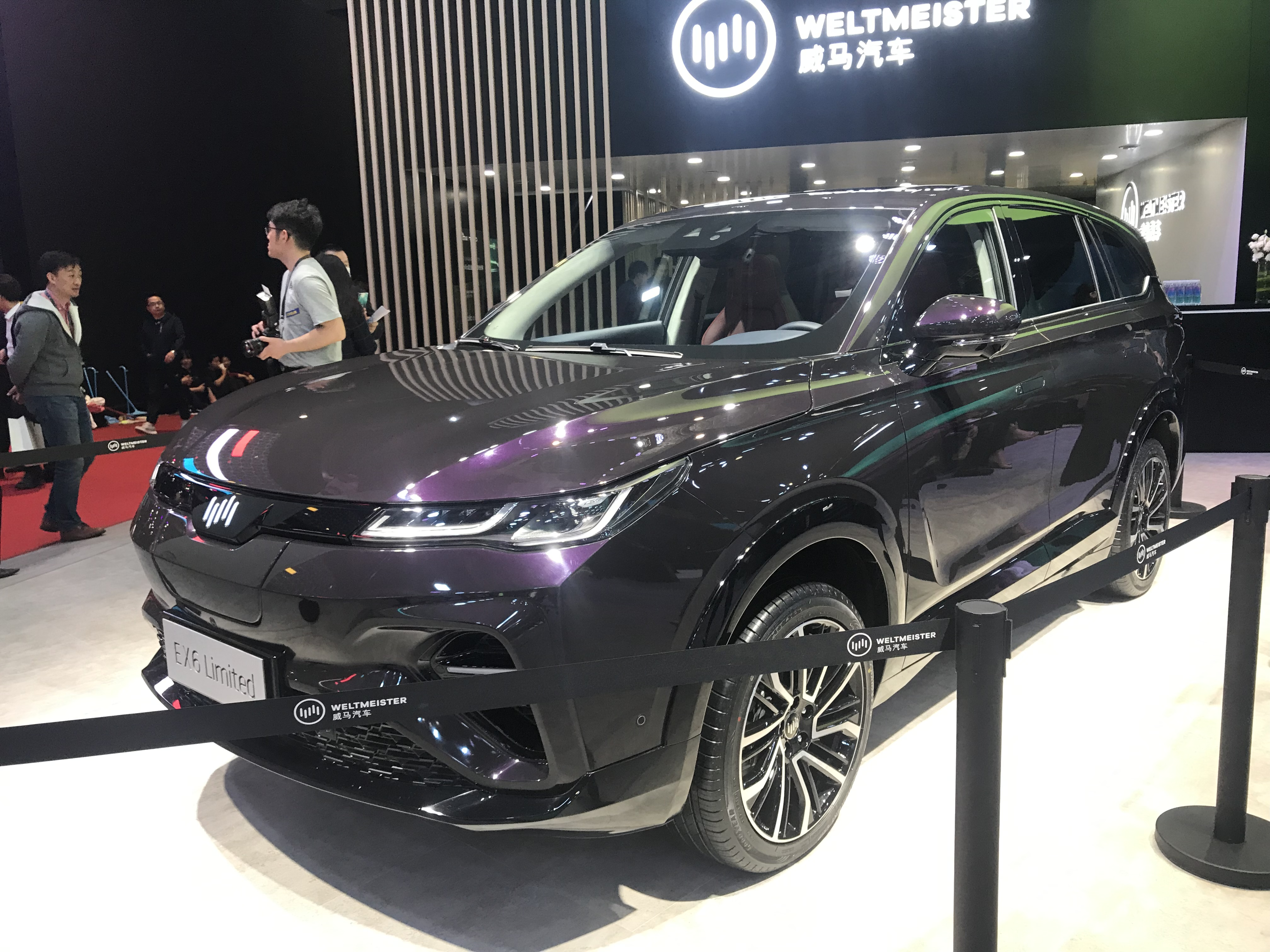
Weltmeister EX6 Limited

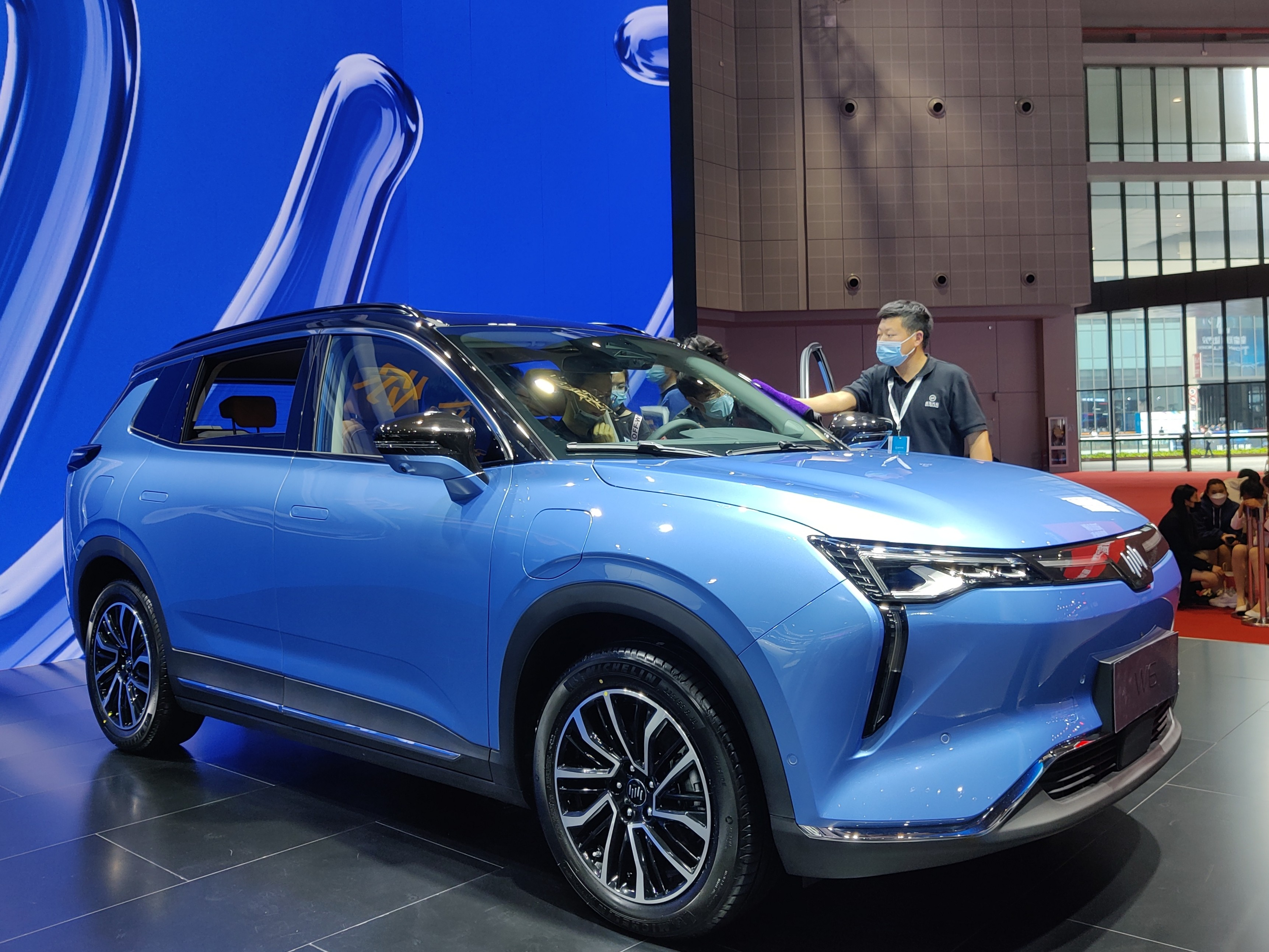
Weltmeister W6

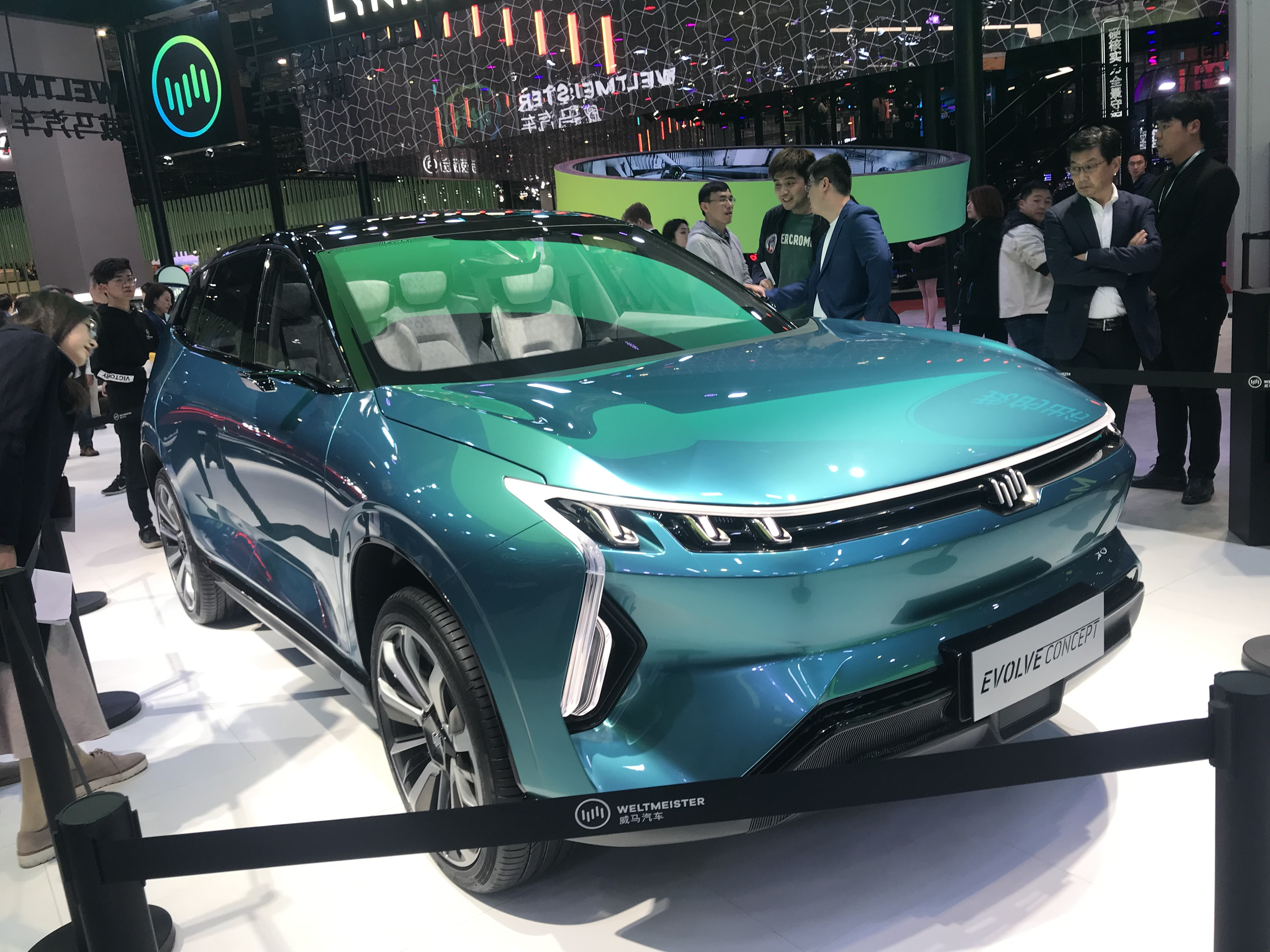
Weltmeister Evolve Concept

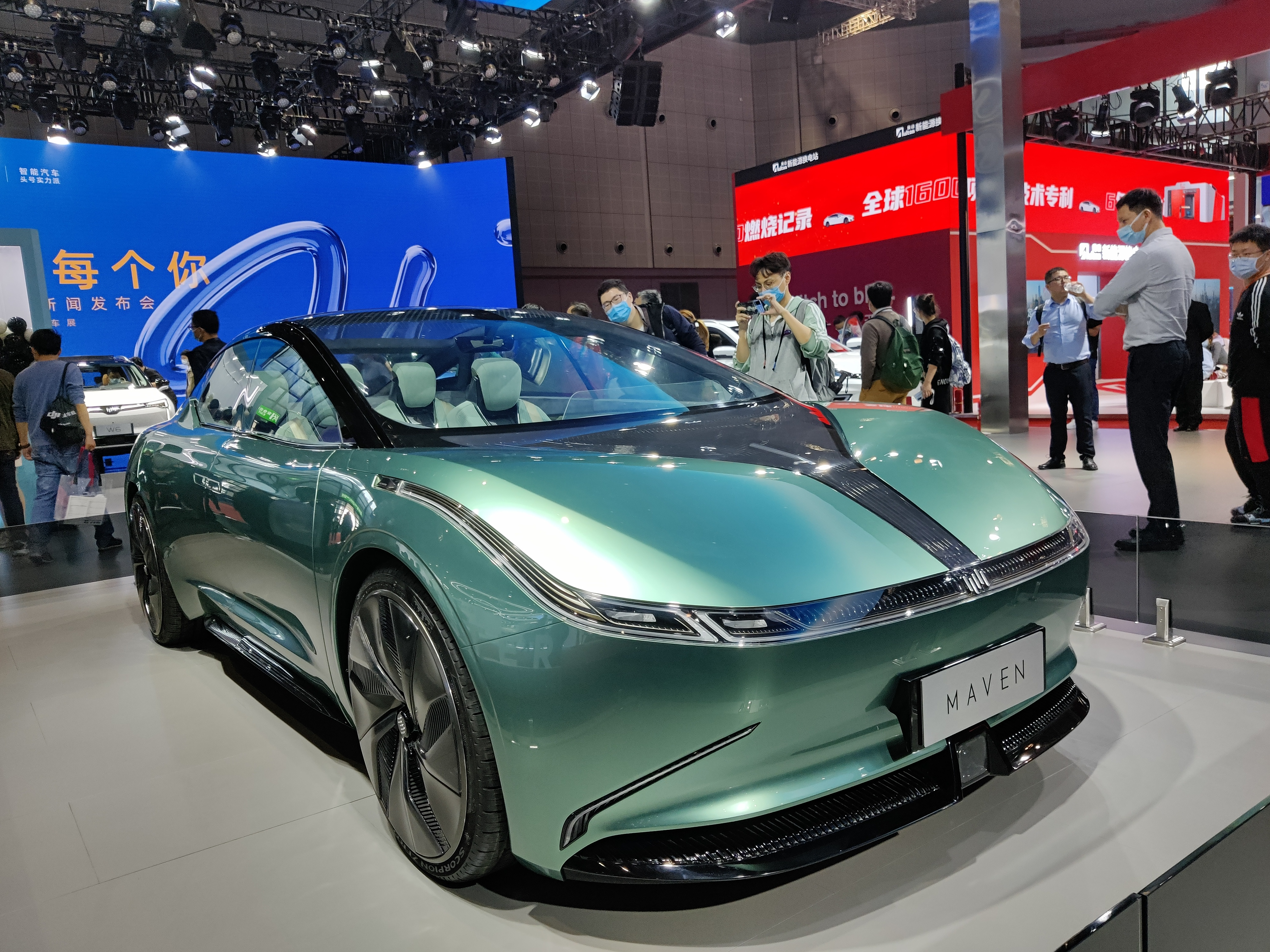
Weltmeister Maven Concept

== Sales ==
Sales of Weltmeister
Year	Total
2019	12,799
2020	21,937
2021	44,152
2022	29,450
2023	0
