= XING Mobility =

XING Mobility Inc.
- Type: Private
- Industry: Automotive
- Founded: Taipei, Taiwan; 2015; 11 years ago
- Key people: Royce YC Hong, CEO & Co-founder Azizi Tucker, CTO & Co-founder Godfrey Ngai, CFO
- Website: xingmobility.com

XING Mobility is a provider of electric vehicle powertrain and battery technology. XING Mobility was founded in 2015 and is headquartered in Taipei, Taiwan.

== Background ==
XING Mobility was founded by Royce YC Hong and Azizi Tucker. Xing Mobility was launched with the aim of developing race-derived advanced engineering and technology and supplying it to the global smart mobility market. The company's first electric concept car, Miss E, debuted at the 2017 EV Taiwan exhibition alongside an early version of the company's second concept car, Miss R.

== Vehicles ==
=== Miss E ===
Miss E is the first prototype electric race car developed by XING Mobility. Miss E was primarily developed as a platform in order to test some of the company's technologies. Miss E has a 450V motor, which produces 400 hp and 430Nm (221 ft.lb.) of torque. The battery pack is rated at 33 kW·h. Miss E has a claimed top speed of 288 to 300 km/h (179-186 mph) depending on configuration.

=== Miss R ===
Miss R also a prototype electric vehicle. It has been designed to be driven both on-road and off-road. The manufacturer claims a 0–100 km/h (0-62 mph) time of 1.8 seconds, a 0–200 km/h (0-124 mph) time of 5.1 seconds, and a projected top speed of over 270 km/h(168 mph).

It is considered to be proof of concept for the company's battery pack system. The design of the battery system allows each cell to be immersed in a non-conductive thermal transfer fluid. Its battery pack, which consists of 98 modules each containing 42 lithium-ion cells, is capable of producing one megawatt of power (the equivalent of 1341 horsepower). The company reports the battery has a capacity of 52 kW·h. The battery pack is user changeable and has been designed to be changed in less than 5 minutes.

The initial concept car measures 4,000 (L) x 1,800 (W) x 1,300mm (H), while its wheel base is 2,950mm and its mass is 1,500 kg.

Miss R was displayed at Goldman Sachs' Asia Pacific TechNet Conference held in Hong Kong on May 24, 2018, as well as AutoTronics Taipei held at Nangang Exhibition Center from April 11 to 14, 2018.
