= Weltmeister EX5 =

EX5
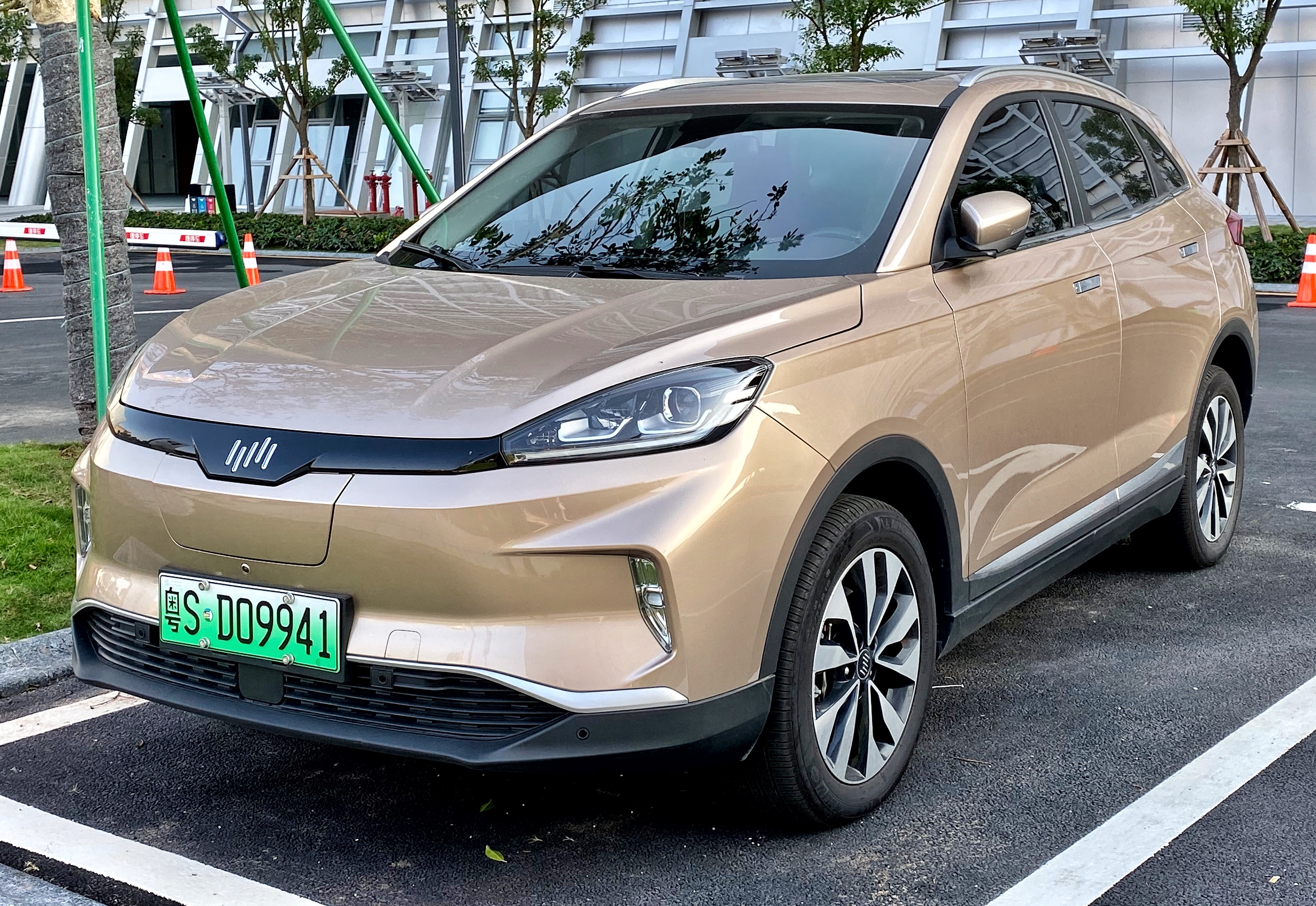

Overview
- Manufacturer: WM Motor
- Production: 2018–2022
- Assembly: China: Wenzhou
- Designer: Icona

Body and chassis
- Class: Compact crossover SUV (C)
- Body style: 5-door SUV

Powertrain
- Electric motor: Permanent Magnet Synchronous Motor
- Power output: 160 kW (215 hp; 218 PS)
- Transmission: 1-speed direct-drive
- Battery: 52.5 kWh; 69 kWh
- Electric range: 400 km (248.5 mi) & 520 km (323.1 mi)

Dimensions
- Wheelbase: 2,703 mm (106.4 in)
- Length: 4,585 mm (180.5 in)
- Width: 1,835 mm (72.2 in)
- Height: 1,672 mm (65.8 in)

The WM Motor (Weltmeister) EX5 is a battery electric compact crossover SUV that is manufactured by the Chinese NEV manufacturer WM Motor (Chinese: 威马汽车) under the brand Weltmeister. The model was first announced in December 2017 and unveiled to the public in May 2018 at the Beijing Auto Show. Mass production of the EX5 began in September 2018.

== Overview ==
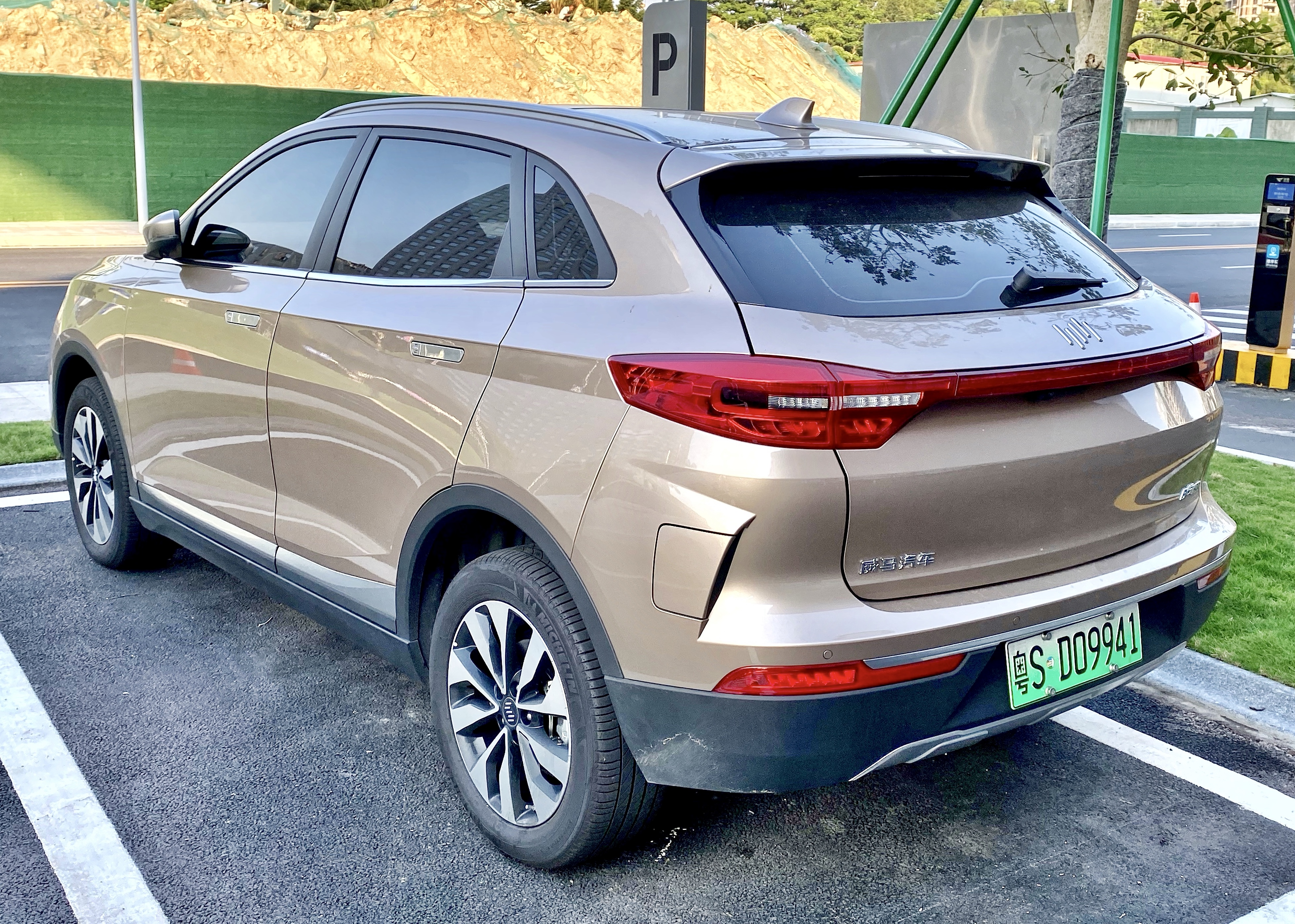
WM Motor EX5 rear

The WM Motor EX5 production version made its debut at the 2018 Beijing Auto Show. The price of the EX5 ranges from CNY¥139,800 (~US$20,000) to CNY¥189,800 (~US$27,100), inclusive of Chinese government electric vehicle subsidies.

There are three variants of the EX5, the EX5 400 Mate, EX5 400 and EX5 520. The EX5 400 Mate and EX5 400 are both equipped with a 52.5 kWh (189 MJ) battery that provides 400 kilometres (250 mi) NEDC range. The EX5 520 is equipped with a 69 kWh (250 MJ) battery and achieves 520 kilometres (320 mi) NEDC range. In all EX5 variants, WM Motor uses 160 kW (218 PS; 215 hp) electric drive modules supplied by BorgWarner that can provide up to 315 N⋅m (232 lb⋅ft; 32 kg⋅m) of torque.

WM Motor supplies a 6.6 kW, 220V home charger that can fully charge the EX5 in 8.5 to 9 hours. Charging from 30% to 80% takes 30 minutes when using 120 kW DC fast chargers.

The EX5 features the 'Living Pilot' intelligent driving assistance system with L2 ADAS autonomous driving features, as well as the Living Engine operating system for its infotainment system.

On 28 September 2018, one year from the start of the production of the EX5, the company announced that it had delivered over 16,000 EX5s, with the model maintaining a customer satisfaction score of 97%.

== Specifications ==
=== Driver assistance ===
Since Q2 2019, the EX5 can be equipped with Bosch L2 ADAS features, which WM Motor claims is the first in class to do so. The Living Pilot L2 ADAS features use a sensor suite consisting of one high-definition front camera, three medium distance millimeter wave radars, a 360-degree camera system consisting of 4 cameras mounted around the vehicle, and 12 ultrasonic sensors. In January, 2019, WM Motor announced a partnership with Baidu to jointly develop L3 and L4 autonomous driving technologies, and establish the 'WM Motor & Baidu Apollo Intelligent Vehicle Joint Research Center'.

=== Infotainment ===
WM Motor's Living Engine infotainment system is powered by their self-developed operating system. It features third-party applications including Tencent (QQ Music for music streaming; WeChat for instant messaging), Baidu (Baidu Maps for navigation), iQiyi (video streaming platform) as well as Xiaomi and Gree Electric (smart home appliances). It can use facial recognition to identify the user and log into online music and video streaming and social media accounts in the vehicle. The system uses a 12.8-inch rotating touchscreen display which functions as the main user interface for the infotainment and environmental control systems as well as a 12.3-inch LCD digital instrument panel. It also features a voice assistant, 'Xiaowei' (Chinese: 小威) that both the driver and passengers can use.

=== Powertrain ===
WM Motor's Living Motion powertrain consists of an electric drive module, battery pack and electronic control insulated-gate bipolar transistor (IGBT) power electronics. It uses components from suppliers including BorgWarner (electric drive module), Infineon (electronic control IGBT), as well as CATL, Tianjin Lishen (天津力神) and Tafel (塔菲尔新能源科技) (lithium-ion battery cells and modules). The battery pack is fitted with WM Motor's self-developed BMS that monitors and maintains battery cell temperatures in climate conditions ranging from −30 °C (−22 °F) to 50 °C (122 °F). The BMS helps to prevent battery degradation, with the EX5 having been shown to experience only 5% degradation after 160,000 kilometres (99,000 mi) of real world driving.

== Safety ==
In July 2019, the EX5 was certified with C-NCAP 5-star safety rating.

=== Battery ===
The EX5's battery pack is positioned at the center of the car and has an IP67 ingress protection rating.

L2 ADAS

The EX5 has several active safety features including Adaptive Cruise Control (ACCA), Intersection Collision Avoidance (ICA), Traffic Jam Assist (TJA) and Automatic Parking Assist (APA). WM Motor claims it releases OTA updates to improve these L2 systems every quarter.

== Sales ==
Year	China
2019	15,587
2020	22,236
2021	24,025
2022	4,317
