= Weltmeister W6 =

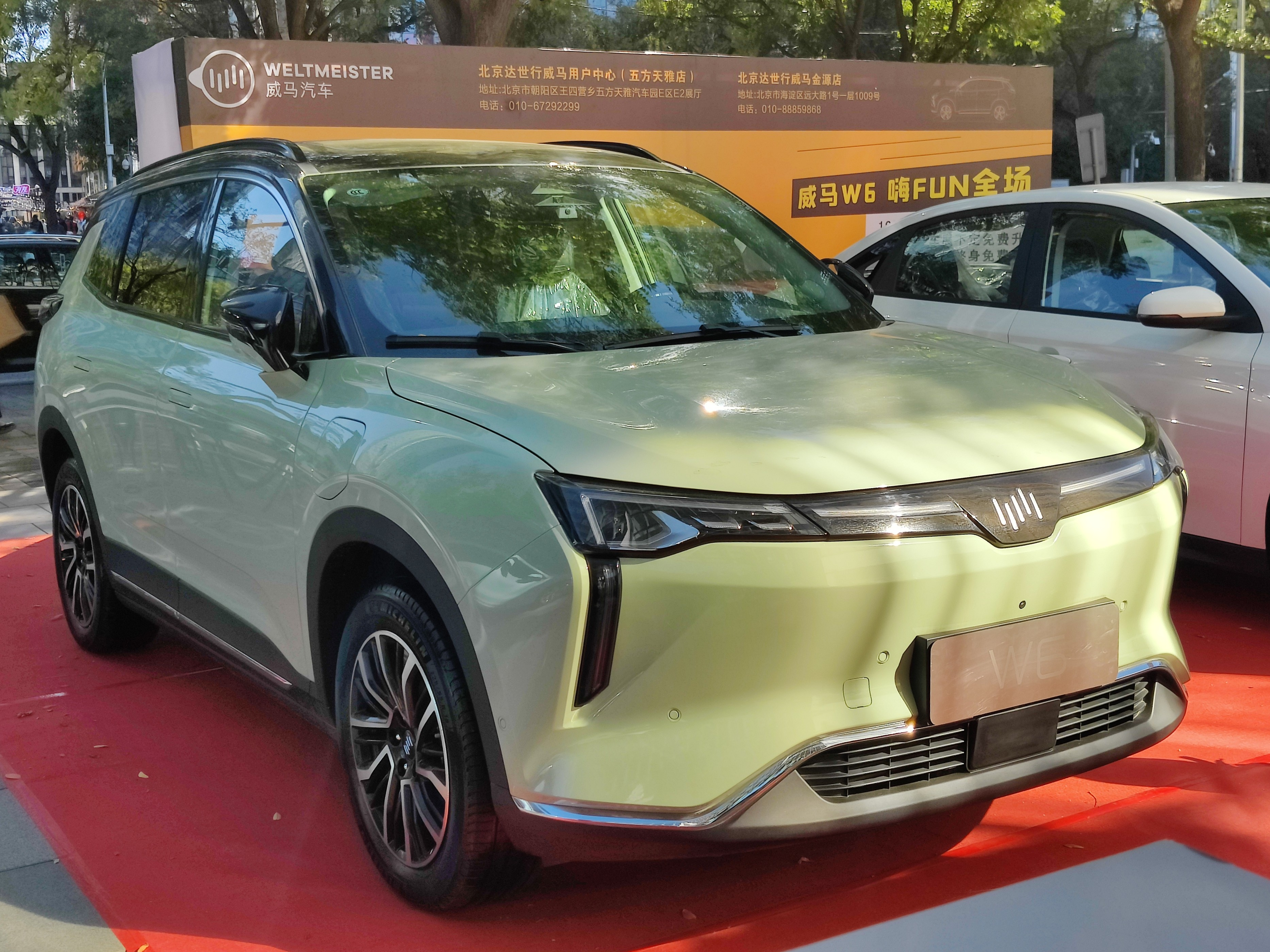

Overview
- Manufacturer: WM Motor
- Production: 2021–2022
- Assembly: China: Wenzhou

Body and chassis
- Class: Mid-size crossover SUV
- Body style: 5-door SUV

Powertrain
- Electric motor: Permanent Magnet Synchronous Motor
- Transmission: 1-speed direct drive
- Battery: 69 kWh
- Electric range: 520 km (323.1 mi)

Dimensions
- Wheelbase: 2,715 mm (106.9 in)
- Length: 4,620 mm (181.9 in)
- Width: 1,847 mm (72.7 in)
- Height: 1,730 mm (68.1 in)

The Weltmeister W6 is a battery electric mid-size crossover SUV produced by the Chinese NEV manufacturer WM Motor (Chinese: 威马汽车) under the brand Weltmeister. Mass production of the W6 began in January 2021.

== Overview ==
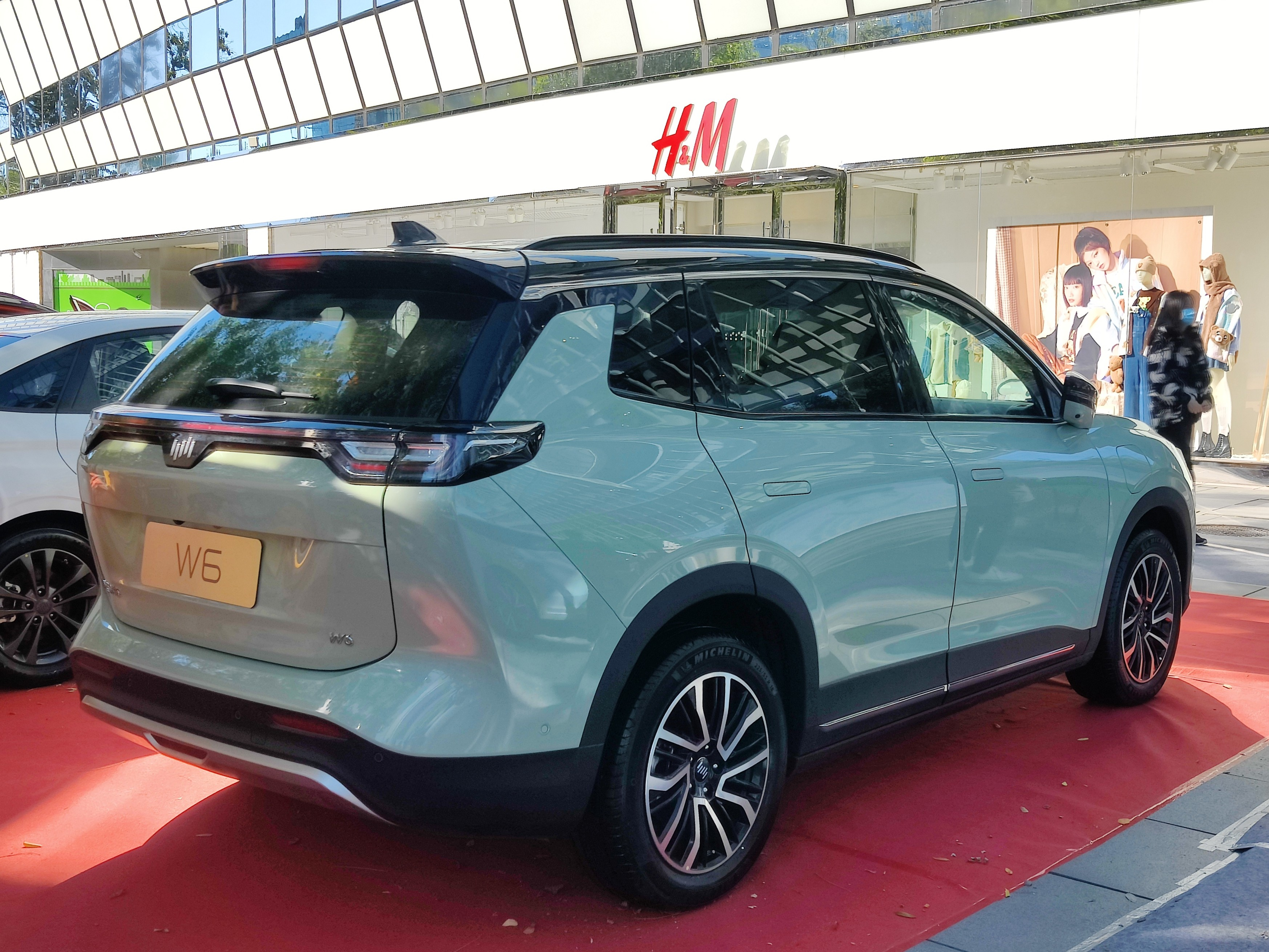
Weltmeister W6 rear

The design of the W6 was originally previewed by the Weltmeister Evolve Concept during the 2019 Auto Shanghai.

The production version of the W6 was developed in cooperation with Baidu, and is equipped with unmanned autonomous parking technology. The W6 is capable of performing self-driving functions under specific scenarios using Baidu’s Apollo platform. The Apollo platform feature a Qualcomm 8155 chipset, 5G connectivity, seven cameras, five radars and 12 ultrasonic sensors.

In terms of range, the W6 is equipped with a 65 kWh (230 MJ) battery for 520 kilometres (323.1 mi) of NEDC range.

== Sales ==
Year	China
2021	7,901
2022	6,364
