= RSQ =

RSQ may refer to:

- Audi RSQ, a concept car
- RSQ, a magazine in Slovenia
- Rhetoric Society Quarterly of the Rhetoric Society of America
- Río Seco de la Quebrada Formation, a geological formation in Mendoza Province, Argentina
- RSQ system, a variant of the R-S-T system used by amateur radio operators
- Romano Saxophone Quartet, formed by Arthur Romano
