= Rhythm section =

Group of musicians within a music ensemble or band

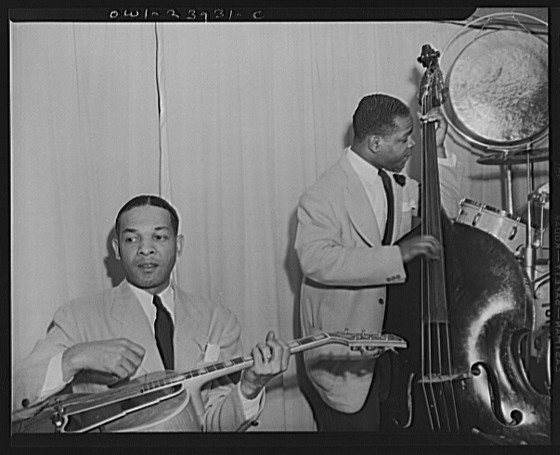
Jazz often features a prominent rhythm section, typically consisting of at least drums and bass, and sometimes a comping instrument such as piano or guitar.

A rhythm section is a group of musicians within a music ensemble or band that provides the underlying rhythm, harmony and pulse of the accompaniment, providing a rhythmic and harmonic reference and "beat" for the rest of the band. The rhythm section is often contrasted with the roles of other musicians in the band, such as the lead guitarist or lead vocals whose primary job is to carry the melody.

The core elements of the rhythm section are usually the drum kit and bass. The drums and bass provide the basic pulse and groove of a song. The section is augmented by other instruments such as keyboard instruments and guitars that are used to play the chord progression upon which the song is based. The bass instrument (either double bass, or electric bass guitar, or another low-register instrument such as the synth bass, depending on the group and its style of music) plays the low-pitched bassline. The bassline is a musical part that supports the chord progression, typically by playing a musically interesting bassline that outlines the important notes of the harmony, often by emphasizing the root, fifth, and third of each chord.

The term is common in modern small musical ensembles, such as bands that play jazz, country, blues, and rock. Orchestras that play popular music, film soundtracks (often called a "pops orchestra"), or musical theatre orchestras may also feature a rhythm section (at a minimum drum kit and electric bass/amplified double bass, but possibly including keyboards and guitar) that performs with the larger ensemble. The rhythm section provides a rock or pop feel and sounds that would be difficult to recreate with orchestral instruments.

== Instruments ==
A typical rhythm section comprises one or more guitars (either electric guitars, in rock music bands; acoustic guitars, in country music, folk music and blues or both electric and acoustic in some bands); and/or a keyboard instrument (piano, electric piano, Hammond organ, synthesizer, etc.) a double bass, an acoustic bass guitar, or an electric bass guitar (depending on the style of music), and drums (usually acoustic, but in some post-1980s styles, the drums may be electronic drums).

In some styles of music, there may be additional percussionists playing instruments such as the djembe or shakers. Some styles of music often have two electric guitarists, such as rock genres like heavy metal music and punk rock. Some styles of music use multiple keyboard instrument performers simultaneously (e.g., piano and Hammond organ or electric piano and synthesizer) for a fuller sound. A rhythm section could be as small as two or three instruments (e.g., a guitarist and a bassist or a power trio of bass, drums and guitar) or it may be a fairly large ensemble with several keyboardists, several guitarists, auxiliary string players (mandolin, ukulele, etc.), a drummer and percussionists.

The largest rhythm sections may be led by a bandleader or a conductor who indicates the tempo of each song, starts each song, leads slow-downs of the music at cadences (sections of songs where the music comes to rest on a chord), and indicates when to change soloists and how and when the song will end.

The instrumentalists used in a rhythm section vary according to the style of music and era. Modern pop, rock and jazz band rhythm sections typically consist of a drummer, a bass player, and one or more players of chordal instruments (e.g., a pianist, guitarist, etc.). The term rhythm section may also refer to the instruments in this group (named collectively the "rhythm section instruments").

Klezmer bands rarely have percussion, but rely heavily on a bass instrument, often brass, and a piano or accordion. Traditional dance music bands from Central and Eastern Europe often build their rhythm section around a double bass and viola - the musician designated with the German term "Bratscher".

In music industry parlance, the amplifiers and some of the instruments are nicknamed the "backline." Backline instruments are commonly provided for bands at music festivals and other concerts where several bands will play during an event. By providing these backline instruments, the changeover process is quickened when new bands take the stage. The backline typically consists of large and heavy items that are hard to transport; this may include large bass amplifiers and guitar amplifiers and their speaker cabinets, a drum kit (with or without cymbals and a snare drum, which drummers often provide themselves), a Hammond organ, stage piano, and a keyboard amplifier.

Notwithstanding being provided amplifiers, an instrumentalist almost always needs to bring their own instrument (i.e. a guitar or bass). A venue often informs musicians about which instruments are supplied as the backline for a given performance, and in many cases, the contract signed by the band and the venue/promoter contains an explicit list of the backline gear that will be on stage, even specifying brand names and model numbers.

== Roles ==
In modern rock music, a rhythm guitarist specializes in rhythmic and chordal playing (as opposed to the melodic guitar solos and lead melody lines played by the lead guitar), often repeating quaver (eighth-note), half note or whole note chords. In the louder genres, such as hard rock, heavy metal, and punk rock, rhythm guitarists often play power chords with distortion. Rhythm guitarists often strum open chords in pop, rock, country, and folk music and play barre chords in many pop and rock styles.

Although rhythm sections spend much of the time providing accompaniment (backing parts) for songs, in some cases they provide other musical roles. In some songs or styles of music, instruments from the rhythm section may play soloistic roles on occasion (e.g., improvised guitar solos or solo breaks) or play a melodic role (e.g., a rhythm guitarist may play a lyrical countermelody behind a singer or a melodic intro line before the lead vocalist starts to sing). Since rhythm sections generally provide the background music for lead instruments and solo singers, rhythm sections are typically not as prominent as a singer or soloist. However, since rhythm sections provide the underpinning for a good performance by the lead instruments and vocalists, good rhythm sections are valued in the music industry. Some of the most accomplished rhythm sections have become famous, such as The Band, the E Street Band and Sly Dunbar and Robbie Shakespeare (the latter in reggae). In some popular bands, all of the band members, including rhythm section members, have become famous as individuals (e.g., the rhythm section members of The Beatles, The Rolling Stones, The Who, etc.).

In almost all genres of popular music and traditional music that use rhythm sections, ranging from rock to country to jazz, the rhythm section members are expected to be able to improvise (make up) their parts or prepare their own parts for a given song by listening to the CD at home. Once the bassist and chord-playing instruments are provided with the chord progression on a lead sheet (in which chords are typically named using the root note of the chord and its quality; e.g., C Major, d minor, G7, etc.), they are expected to be able to improvise or prepare a bass line and chord voicings, respectively, that suit the style of the song.

In each style of music, there are different musical approaches and styles that rhythm section members are expected to use. For example, in a country music song the guitarist will be expected to be able to perform a chord progression using an intricate fingerpicking style; in a heavy metal song, the guitarist will be expected to play power chords and complex, precise rhythmic patterns; in a jazz song, a guitarist will be expected to be able to play "jazz voicings" of the chords, which emphasize the third, seventh and often the sixth or ninth chord tones (this contrasts with the barre chord voicings used in pop and rock, which emphasize the root, fifth, and to a lesser degree, the third of the chord). Drummers and percussionists are expected to be able to improvise or prepare rhythm parts that suit the style of a given song. In some cases, an arranger, orchestrator or composer will provide a written-out bass part or drum part written in music notation (the five-line staff in which the notes are round symbols with or without stems). It is rare in jazz or rock for chords to be written out in music notation; the arranger or songwriter typically writes the chord symbol and expects the guitarist to improvise the appropriate chord voicing.

=== Other roles ===
Rhythm section members may be expected to sing backup vocals or harmony parts in some styles of music. In some styles of music, notably 2010s-era pop, hip hop music and funk, rhythm section members may be required to perform a rhythmic dance routine, which may range from a simple body movement to a complex dance choreography that requires significant dance skills. In some types of heavy metal music, rhythm section members (guitar, bass, drums) may be expected to be able to "headbang" (move their head in an up and down fashion in time with the beat) while performing. Less commonly, some rhythm section members may sing lead vocals (e.g., Phil Collins or Sting). In some groups, one rhythm section member may have other roles, such as bandleader (e.g., jazz bassist Charles Mingus), conductor (often the case in 2010s-era musical theatre shows), songwriter, composer or arranger.

== Components ==
=== Jazz ===
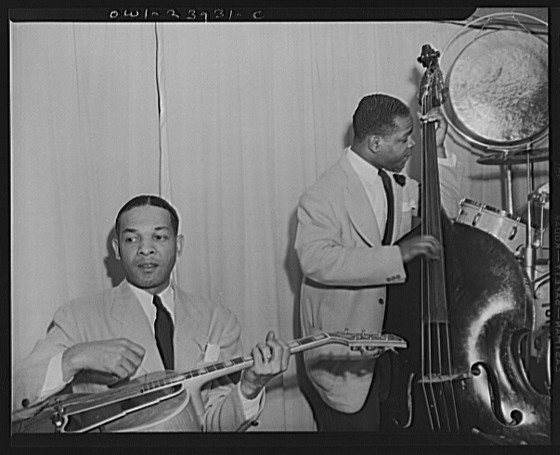
Two members of Duke Ellington's rhythm section at the Hurricane Ballroom: a jazz guitarist and an upright bass player.

In the case of swing bands, the classic rhythm section comprises a quartet of electric guitar, piano, double bass, and drums; a noted example is that of the Count Basie Orchestra with Freddie Green, the Count, Walter Page, and Jo Jones. Earlier jazz bands had used banjo in place of guitar, and other bass instruments such as the tuba for recording purposes prior to the advent of microphone technology in studios.

As bebop evolved, smaller jazz groups dropped the guitar, and many free jazz ensembles dropped the piano as well. Auxiliary percussion such as claves, bongos or maracas can also be used, especially in music influenced by strains from Latin America such as salsa and samba. In theory any instrument or instruments can provide a steady rhythm: for example, in the trio led by Jimmy Giuffre the late 1950s, the clarinet, valve trombone and guitar all switched between lead and supporting roles.

In the 1950s, some jazz bandleaders began to replace the double bass with the then-newly invented electric bass. However, the electric bass made a big impact on jazz in the 1970s, with the advent of jazz rock and jazz fusion. The electric bass was much easier to amplify to stadium-filling volumes using large bass speaker cabinets and amplifiers than an upright bass. The electric bass also began to be used as an expressive solo instrument, as exemplified by the performances of Jaco Pastorius and Stanley Clarke.

In the 1970s, the main chordal rhythm instruments were often electric instruments such as the Rhodes electric piano or electric clavinet, often run through effects units such as fuzz, phasers, or wah-wah pedals and amplified through loud keyboard amplifiers. The jazz fusion rhythm section followed the lead of the rock rhythm sections of the era, and used banks of speakers and powerful amplifiers to create a massive sound large enough for stadium concerts. In the later 1980s and subsequent decades, jazz fusion bands such as the Chick Corea Elektric Band used synthesizers in the rhythm section, both for chordal accompaniment and for synth bass parts.

=== R&B, rock and pop ===
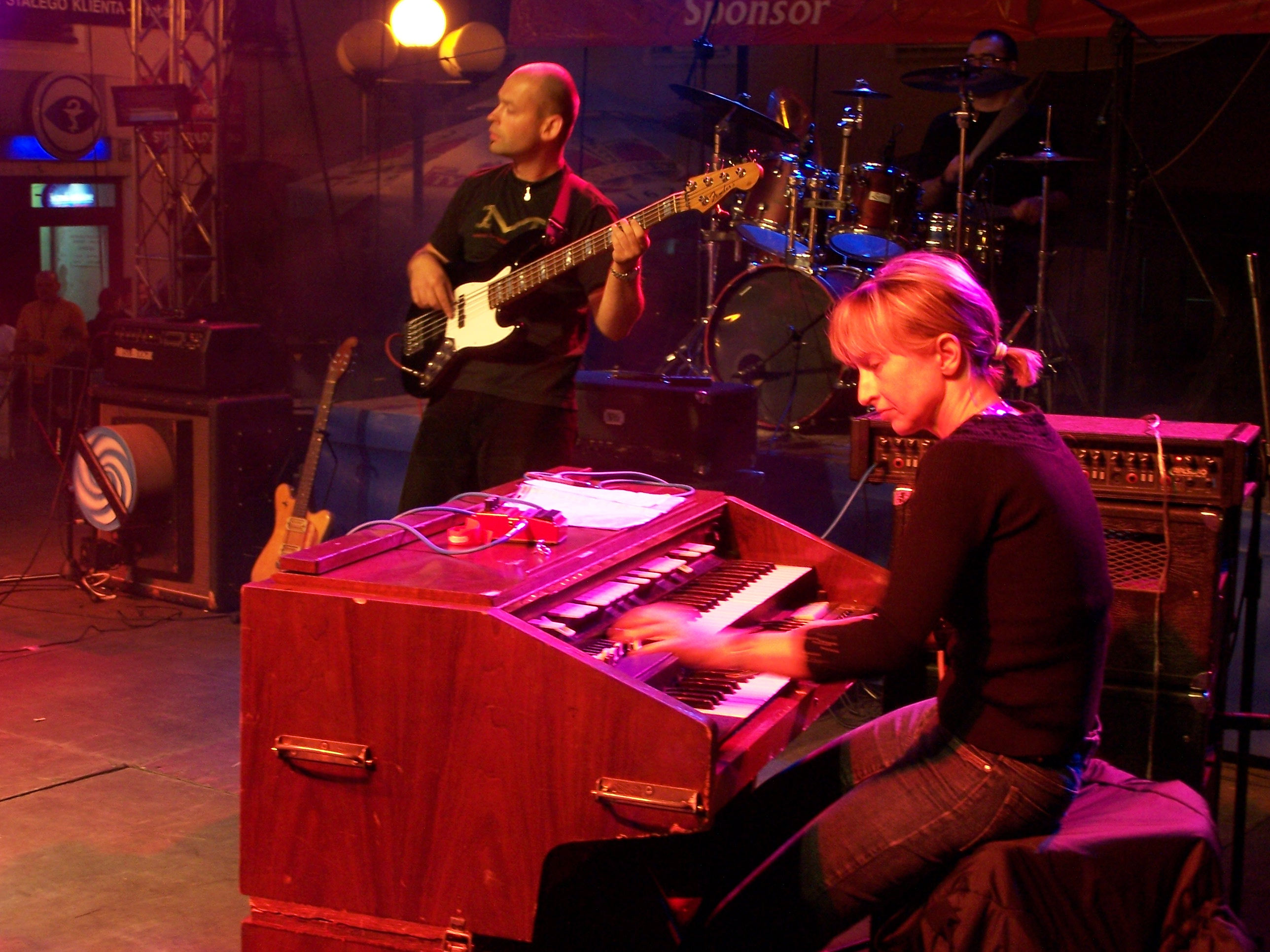
This Polish group's rhythm section consists of a Hammond organist, an electric bassist, and a drummer.

R&B and rock and roll groups in the 1950s emphasized rhythm, so their backup bands generally consisted only of the standard swing band rhythm section of guitar, piano, bass, and drums supporting a vocalist, and in some cases omitting the keyboards. The bass guitar took over from the double bass in the 1950s, and had almost completely taken over the bass role in the 1960s. As the 1960s progressed the term "rhythm section" as used in a pop music context sometimes came to refer to just the bass and drums. For example, Paul McCartney and Ringo Starr of the Beatles were referred to as the band's rhythm section.

In the 1970s, chordal instruments such as the electric and/or acoustic guitar and various keyboards (piano, electric piano, Hammond organ, clavinet) continued to be used to augment the bass and drums in soul, funk, and reggae groups. The sound of late 1960s and 1970s rhythm sections was often given a unique tone and sound due to the use of effects units. Funk bass players would play through auto-wah or envelope follower pedals. Reggae guitarists would plug into echo pedals. Rock guitarists would run their electric guitars through distortion and wah pedals. Electric piano or clavinet players also used effects.

In the 1980s, many rock and pop bands continued to be based around the basic rock rhythm section established by 1960s and 1970s bands: electric bass, drums, and electric guitar or keyboards. In the 1980s, the first widely-affordable digital synthesizer, Yamaha's DX7, was released. The distinctive FM synthesis tone of the DX7 is a key part of the sound of many 1980s pop and dance singles.

As electronic effects became more sophisticated, with the development of digital signal processing, during the 1980s, there was some crossover between the roles played by electronic keyboards and electric guitar. Even though electronic keyboards or organs were the standard instruments used to create sustained "pads" of sound (e.g., held backing chords) for ballads, with the introduction of digital delay pedals and other modern effects, electric guitars could produce similar "pads" or "walls of sound". The Edge, the guitarist from the rock band U2, often used digital delay and reverb-drenched electric guitar arpeggios (chords played one note after the other) to create a shimmering, sustained "pad" for the group. These arpeggio pads created a sustained sound that was similar to the sound of an electronic keyboard. By the late 1980s, the price of digital effects pedals dropped, making these effects units available to the general public.

During the 1980s era, rhythm sections in some styles of pop took an increasing turn towards electronic instruments. A 1980s-era dance pop band might be backed up by a rhythm section of a synth bass, electronic drums (or drum machine) and various synthesizer keyboards. In some 1980s and 1990s bands, live human rhythm sections were sometimes replaced by sequenced MIDI synthesizer rhythm tracks made in the studio. In the 1980s and 1990s, the roots rock scene went in the opposite direction from dance pop; roots rock favoured traditional instruments in the rhythm section such as acoustic piano, acoustic guitar, mandolin, pedal steel guitar, acoustic bass guitar and upright bass. Another 1980s-era trend that helped revive interest in acoustic instruments was the "MTV Unplugged" style of performances, in which a rock band performs with acoustic instruments, including acoustic guitars and an acoustic bass guitar.

In rock and pop, rhythm sections range in size from the barest, stripped-down size of the "power trio" (guitarist, bassist, and drummer) and the organ trio (Hammond organist, drummer, and a third instrument) to large rhythm sections with several stringed instrument players (mandolin, acoustic guitar, electric guitar, etc.), multiple keyboard players (e.g., piano, Hammond organ, electric piano, synth), two instruments playing a bass role (e.g., bass guitar and synth bass) and a group of auxiliary percussionists (congas, shakers, etc.) to fill out (or "sweeten") the sound. Some rhythm sections combine electronic/digital instruments that are sequenced, pre-recorded backup tracks and live instruments (including electric, electronic and acoustic instruments).

== Musical roles ==
The drums and bass both supply a rhythmic pulse for the music, and the bass instrument supplies a harmonic foundation with a bassline. The types of basslines performed by the bass guitarist vary widely from one style of music to another. Despite all of the differences in the styles of bassline in most styles of popular music, the bass guitarist fulfills a similar role: anchoring the harmonic framework (often by emphasizing the roots of the chord progression) and laying down the beat (in collaboration with the drummer). The importance of the bass guitarist and the bass line varies in different styles of music. In some pop styles, such as 1980s-era pop and musical theater, the bass sometimes plays a relatively simple part, and the music forefronts the vocals and melody instruments. In contrast, in reggae or funk, entire songs may be centered around the bass groove, and the bassline is very prominent in the mix.

Similarly, the role of the drummer varies a great deal from one style of music to another. In some types of music, such as traditional 1950s-style country music, the drummer has a rudimentary "timekeeping" role, and the drums are placed low in the mix by the sound engineers. In styles such as progressive rock, metal, and jazz fusion, the drummers often perform complex, challenging parts, and the drums may be given a prominent placement in the mix; as well, the drummer may be often given prominent solo breaks, fills, or introductions that put the spotlight on their technical skills and musicality. In the more experimental forms of free jazz and jazz fusion, the drummer may not play the strict "timekeeping" role that is associated with drums in pop music. Instead, the drums may be used more to create textured polyrhythmic soundscapes. In this type of situation, the main pulse is often provided by the bass player rather than the drummer.

The rhythm section members sometimes break out of their accompaniment role when they are asked to perform keyboard solos, bass breaks, or drum solos. In genres such as progressive rock, art rock, or progressive metal, the rhythm section members may play complicated parts along with the lead guitar (or vocalist) and perform extended solos. In jazz groups and jazz fusion bands, the rhythm section members are often called on to perform improvised solos. In jazz, the drummer may "trade" short solo sections with a saxophone player or trumpet player; this practice, nicknamed "trading fours", typically involves the drummer and the horn player alternating four bar solo sections during a jazz tune. They can also trade eights, twos, ones, or other numbers depending on the musical context.

== Variants ==
=== Organ trios ===
In organ trios, the lower octaves of a Hammond organ or electronic keyboard are used as a substitute for bass guitar or double bass. The organist can play the bassline using the bass pedal keyboard or using the lower manual. As well, the organist could play right-hand chords and melodies. Organ trios were a widely used type of jazz ensemble in the 1950s and 1960s to play hard bop.

Organ trios are sometimes used in rock as well. The Doors' keyboardist Ray Manzarek used a keyboard bass to play the bass lines. Manzarek, guitarist Robby Krieger, and drummer John Densmore would act as an organ trio with the addition of singer Jim Morrison.

=== Dixieland bands ===
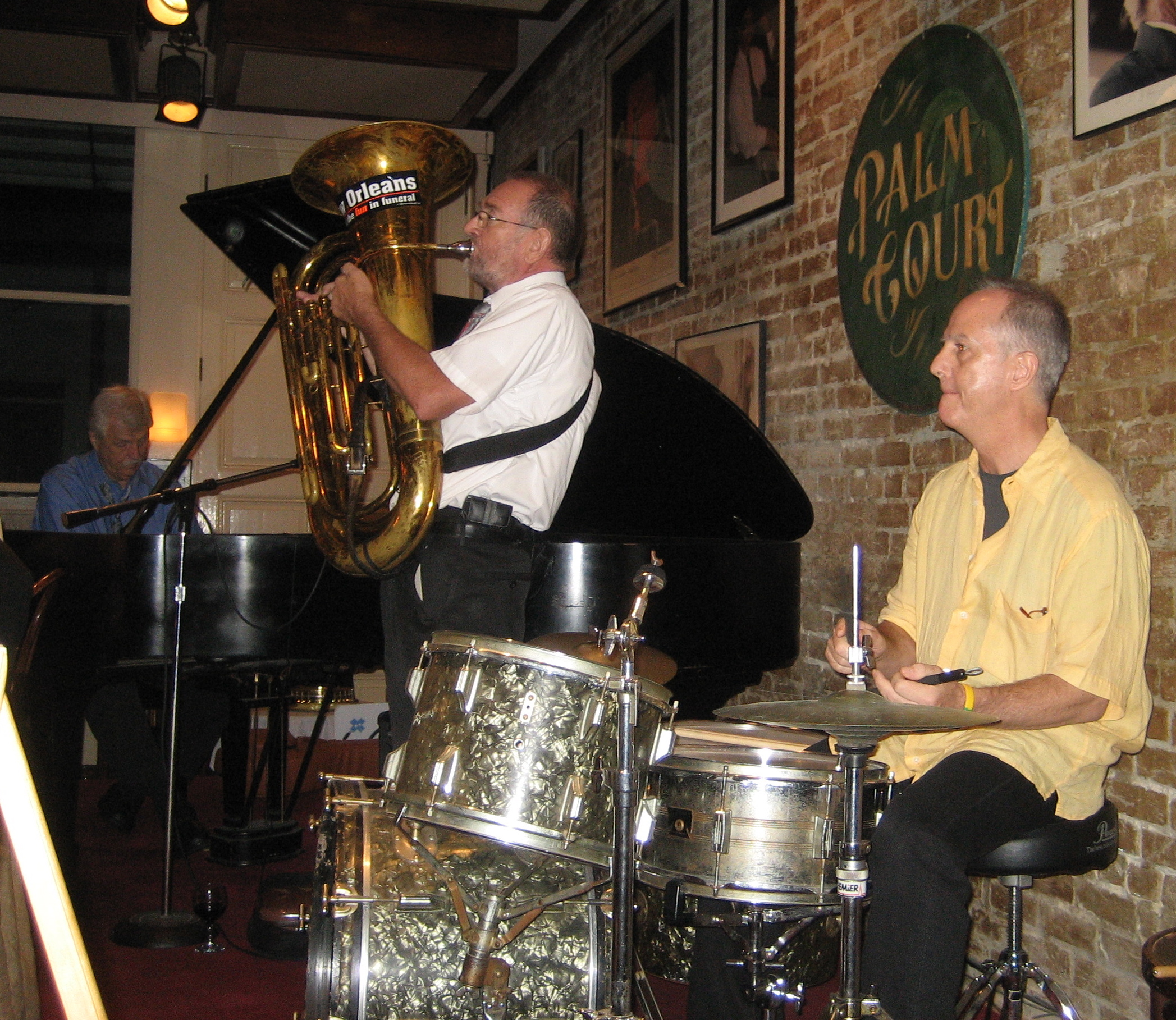
Dixieland band rhythm sections sometimes use a tuba for the bassline.

New Orleans or Dixieland jazz bands occasionally use tuba, sousaphone, or bass saxophone in place of the double bass that was common in 1920s-era jazz bands. This tradition developed from the origins of New Orleans music in marching bands, which used instruments that could be carried on harnesses or with straps. Marching bands use a mixture of brass, woodwind, and percussion instruments, because all of these instruments can be played while marching.

== Other variants ==
Not all rhythm sections follow the standard model of drummer-bassist-chordal instrument. Some bands have no drummer. In bands without a drummer, one or more instruments from the rhythm section often play in styles that replace the drum kit role—that is laying down the beat and backbeat. Traditional bluegrass bands typically do not have a drummer. In bluegrass bands, the timekeeping role is shared between several instruments: the upright bass generally plays the on-beats while the mandolin plays chop chords on the off-beats, with the banjo also keeping a steady eighth note rhythm.

This distributed nature allows for rhythmic continuity while players take turns highlighting the melody. In funk-oriented groups that do not have a drummer, the electric bass player may take over some of the drummer's role by using slap bass. With slap bass, the bassist slaps the low strings to create a strong "thump" (similar to the bass drum's role) and "snaps" or "pops" the high strings to create a percussive effect (the latter takes over some of the role played by the hi-hat cymbals). In some bands, there may be no bass player—the basslines may be played by the piano player, synth player, or guitarist. Using a guitar player to provide basslines is particularly effective if a guitar player has a seven-string guitar with a low "B" string.

Some jazz duos consist of a singer accompanied by a single piano player. In these duos, the jazz piano player has a challenging task; they have to provide all of the rhythmic and harmonic foundation that would normally be provided by a full rhythm section. A jazz pianist accompanying a singer in a duo needs to play a deep bassline, chords, and fill-in melody lines while the singer is performing. The pianist often improvises an instrumental solo in between vocal melodies.

Rarely, a jazz vocalist may perform in a duo with a double bass player. In this duo setting, the bass player may have to use less commonly used bass techniques to fill out the sound, such as occasionally playing two- or three-note double stops (to recreate the chord-playing role normally filled by a guitar or piano) or using percussive slaps on the fingerboard (to recreate some of the percussive elements provided by a drummer). The Canadian bassist Michel Donato has performed in a duo with singer Karen Young, and the pair released several albums in the 1980s and 1990s.
