= Arthur Romano =

Arthur Romano may refer to:

- Arthur Romano (musician) (1914-1964), Italian-Canadian saxophonist, clarinetist, oboist, english hornist, and music educator
- Arthur Romano (rugby league) (born 1997), French rugby league player
