= Audi Pikes Peak quattro =

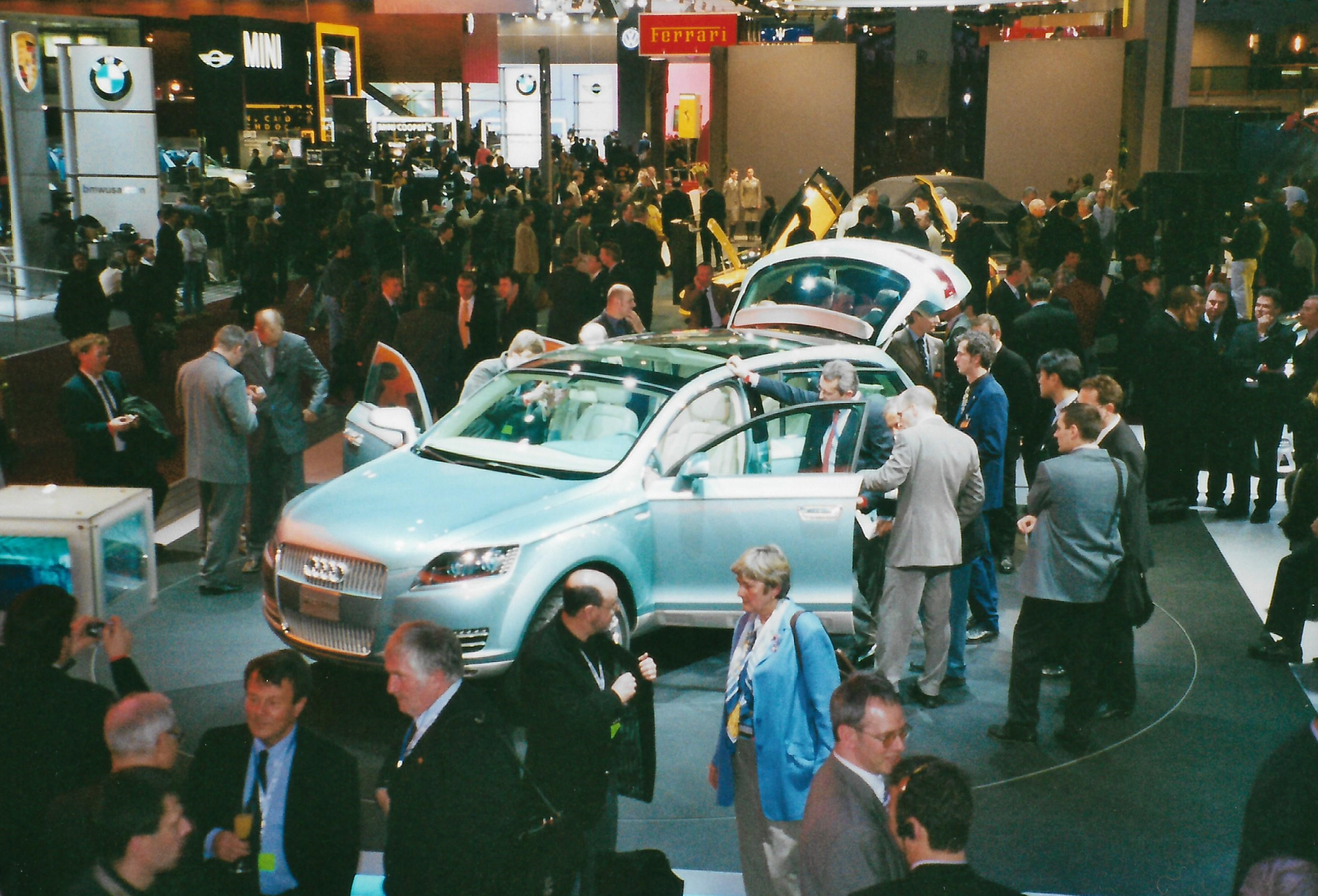

Overview
- Manufacturer: Audi AG
- Production: 2003
- Designer: Satoshi Wada

Body and chassis
- Class: Concept full-size luxury crossover SUV
- Body style: 5-door 6-seater large SUV
- Layout: Front engine, quattro permanent four-wheel drive
- Related: Audi Q7

Powertrain
- Engine: 4.2 Twin Turbo FSI DOHC V8
- Transmission: 6-speed tiptronic automatic transmission

The Audi Pikes Peak quattro was a sport utility vehicle concept car. It was created by German premium automobile manufacturer, Audi. The Pikes Peak quattro was first introduced at the 2003 North American International Auto Show. It was the first of three concept cars designed by Audi and shown in 2003, ahead of the Nuvolari quattro and the Le Mans quattro.

The Pikes Peak quattro was named after the famed hillclimbing course, Pikes Peak in the Rocky Mountains, which they had taken overall wins and broken records during the 1980s, due to the off-road capability of the Audi Quattro and the Audi Sport Quattro.

The Pikes Peak quattro design was subsequently developed into the production Audi Q7.

== Engine, performance, and design ==
In the early 1990s, Audi developed a concept car known as the Audi Quattro Spyder. A clear throwback to the successful rally road car of the early 1980s, which was simply called the Audi Quattro, this new concept proved to be a success when first shown at the 1991 Frankfurt Motor Show. Enthusiasts began to call for a production version, provoking Audi engineers and accountants into discussion of whether or not there was a viable business case for such a vehicle. Ultimately, Audi decided against a production version.

An issue with the Spyder concept was its incompatibility with an existing platform. This issue was addressed when the Audi TT concept was unveiled a few years later at the 1995 Frankfurt Motor show. It shared a platform with the Volkswagen Golf and Audi A3, making it less expensive to manufacture. Other vehicles, such as the Volkswagen Touareg/Porsche Cayenne SUVs jointly developed by Volkswagen and Porsche, evidenced a closer partnership between different Volkswagen Group manufacturers, of which Audi is a member.

The Audi Pikes Peak was developed in a short five-month period after the initial conceptualization and design. The car employs several parts from fellow Volkswagen Group vehicles, including the use of the front and rear axle assemblies from the Touareg, as well as the air-suspension technology also taken from the Touareg and Audi’s A8. The suspension settings can be set to the driver’s preference through a four-level adjustable system. It is capable of manipulating the vehicle’s ride-height, from a range of 7 to 11 inches, allowing it to adapt to a variety of road surfaces.

The concept car also features an all-carbon-fibre body to increase agility on and off-road. To further complement the vehicle’s off-road capability, there are several cameras mounted to the exterior of the car in order to give the driver an increased spatial awareness. One camera is mounted on top of the windshield to monitor the edges of the car’s track, aiding the driver in correcting the vehicle’s position, if it were to veer off-course. Another is mounted ahead of the right-front tire to minimize the risk of running over a curb.

The Pikes Peak quattro uses a twin-turbocharged 4.2 L Fuel Stratified Injection (FSI) V8 engine. This develops 368 kW (500 PS; 493 bhp) and 630 N⋅m (465 lbf⋅ft) of torque from 2000 rpm, and features DOHC (two per cylinder bank) with 5 valves per cylinder.

Engine output is transmitted through a 6-speed tiptronic automatic transmission, complete with steering wheel mounted paddle shifters. quattro permanent four wheel drive system is also standard.
