= Nick Ayoub =

Canadian jazz saxophonist, oboist, English horn player, and composer

- Genres: Jazz
- Occupation: Composer

Nicholas ("Nick") Ayoub was a Canadian jazz saxophonist, oboist, English horn player, and composer. While he focused on jazz in his career, he also performed classical music at some points. He was born in Trois-Rivières, Quebec on September 7, 1926 and died on May 2, 1991.

== Early years and education ==
Ayoub, who had Lebanese parents, grew up in Montreal. He learned clarinet, tenor saxophone, oboe, English horn, and flute. He studied at the Conservatoire de Montréal (CMM), under Arthur Romano, and he was awarded the Premier prix in 1953. Next, he studied with Harold Gomberg from the New York Philharmonic.

== Career ==
=== 1940s ===
He started playing professionally in 1943 in dance bands and jazz bands. He played in bands led by Johnny Holmes, Maynard Ferguson, saxophonist Freddie Nichols, and trombonist Jiro Watanabe.

=== 1950s-1980s ===
He worked as a studio musician in Montreal in the 1950s. He played oboe from time to time (and in some cases, saxophone) in the Montreal Symphony Orchestra. He played in a jazz quintet at the 1963 Montreal Jazz Festival. In 1964, he recorded 'The Montreal Scene' LP with Michel Donato and other local players, under the RCA Victor label.

In 1968, he started teaching saxophone and leading the jazz big band at the CMM. From 1974 to 1978, he taught at the JMC Orford Art Centre. He taught a number of Quebecois musicians, including Yves Charuest, Michel Ethier, Martin Fournier, Daniel Gauthier, Jean-Noël Letennier, Guy McDougall, André Pelchat, Yannick Rieu, and François Théberge.

In the 1970s, he led bands that included trumpet player Alan Penfold and piano player Art Roberts. These bands gigged at clubs and played on CBC radio. He played at the 1988 FIJM with bassist Skip Bey and guitarist Nelson Symonds.

== Discography ==
- Nick Ayoub with Rosita Et Deno - 'Bossa Nova' (LP). Trans-Canada; TC-A-74, 1962.
- 'The Montreal Scene' (Vinyl, LP, Album, Stereo) - with Michel Donato (bass). RCA Victor, PCS-1042, 1964.
- Nick Ayoub - Canadian Talent Library (LP), 1965.
- Nick Ayoub - 'Dance to the Saxophone' (LP). RCA Camden, 1965.
- Nick Ayoub - 'Les Lumier De Québec' (7", Single). Caprice, CAP 4010, 1968
- Nick Ayoub - 'Contact 20 Plus' (with Guy Maufette, Charles Linton, Nick Ayoub, Tony Romandini) (7", Single). Banque Provinciale, M-8955, 1970.
- Nick Ayoub Quintet - 'The Music Of Nick Ayoub' (LP) Radio Canada International, RCI 455, 1977.

== Personal life ==
His son grew up to share his father's musical gifts, and he became a professional drummer.
