= Gerald Danovitch =

Classical saxophonist

- Also known as: Gerry Danovitch
- Born: February 24, 1932; Montreal, Quebec, Canada
- Died: December 1, 1997 (aged 65) Montreal, Quebec, Canada
- Genres: Classical, Jazz
- Occupation(s): musician, bandleader, professor
- Instrument(s): saxophone, clarinet, flute

Gerald Danovitch (February 24, 1932 – December 1, 1997) was a Canadian classical saxophone player and educator, McGill University professor, founder of Gerald Danovitch Saxophone Quartet and jazz studies department at McGill.

== Early life and education ==
Gerald Danovitch studied the clarinet with Joseph Moretti. Later in his studies he picked up saxophone as a second instrument taking lessons with Arthur Romano. Alto and soprano saxophones very soon became his main solo instruments. Danovitch learned to read music in any key, transposing it using the clefs system. His sight reading was outstanding making him a very demanded musician on the Montreal scene, and counting his ability to double fluently on several woodwind instruments, including clarinet, flute, and piccolo he soon became a part of many musical productions in Montreal, Toronto, Ottawa, and other cities.

== Career ==
McGill University professor since 1964, Danovitch was chair of the woodwind area, and in 1968 initiated jazz studies program at the university. In 1968, he founded the Gerald Danovitch Saxophone Quartet. In 1989, Paquito D'Rivera composed New York Suite for the Danovich Saxophone Quartet. Danovich was the orchestra contractor and the bandleader for the Canadian premiere of The Phantom of the Opera musical in Ottawa.

Danovitch taught many prominent classical saxophone players including Peter Freeman and Abe Kestenberg who were part of the Gerald Danovitch Saxophone Quartet.

In late 1995, Danovich was invited by Andrew Homzy and George Doxas to start a 1930s-styled big band The Valentino Orchestra. As a lead alto and clarinet player, Danovich recorded two out of three CDs of the group. Danovich's part on the last track of the second CD was recorded by his student, second alto player of the band, Boris Khodorkovsky, after Danovich died.

With The Valentino Orchestra, Danovich performed at the du Maurier stage of the Montreal International Jazz Festival in June 1997, several months before his death.

== Discography ==
1985 — Esquisses. Dubois Quatuor — M. Perrault Esquisses québécoises — McGill University Records 85022
1986 — Jones Three Preludes and a Fugue. 5-ACM 24
1987 — Gerald Danovitch Saxophone Quartet — CBC Records [1018]
1988 — Patriquin Earthpeace One. L. and I. Zuk piano. A Tempo 29588 (cass)
1989 — Free Trade. D. Matthews — Arnold — D'Rivera — et al. New York Saxophone Quartet. CBC JazzImage 2-0118 (CD)
1991 — Celebration: One Hundred and Fifty Years of the Saxophone. — featuring Eugene Rousseau — McGill University Records 750042-2 (CD)
1996 — My Foolish Heart — The Valentino Orchestra — Just A Memory Records (CD)
1998 — Feelin' No Pain — The Valentino Orchestra — Just A Memory Records 9137-2 (CD)
2001 — Classics & Pop Pieces
