= Audi Nuvolari quattro =

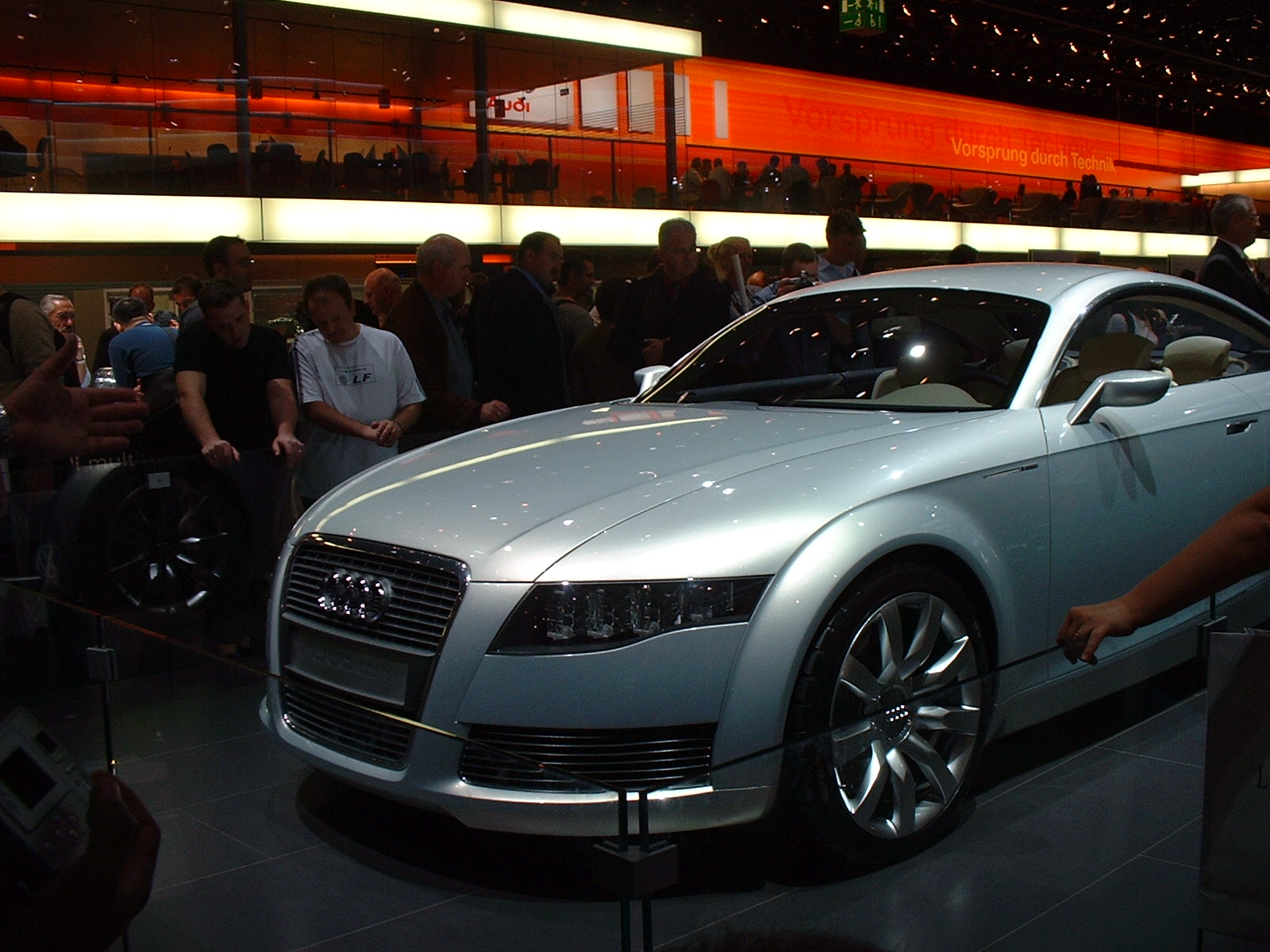

Overview
- Manufacturer: Audi AG
- Production: 2003

Body and chassis
- Class: Concept car
- Body style: 2-door 4-seat coupé
- Layout: Front engine, quattro permanent four wheel drive
- Related: Audi A4; Audi A5

Powertrain
- Engine: 5.0 L DOHC twin-turbocharged TFSI V10
- Transmission: 6-speed automatic

Dimensions
- Length: 4,800 mm (189.0 in)
- Width: 1,920 mm (75.6 in)
- Height: 1,410 mm (55.5 in)

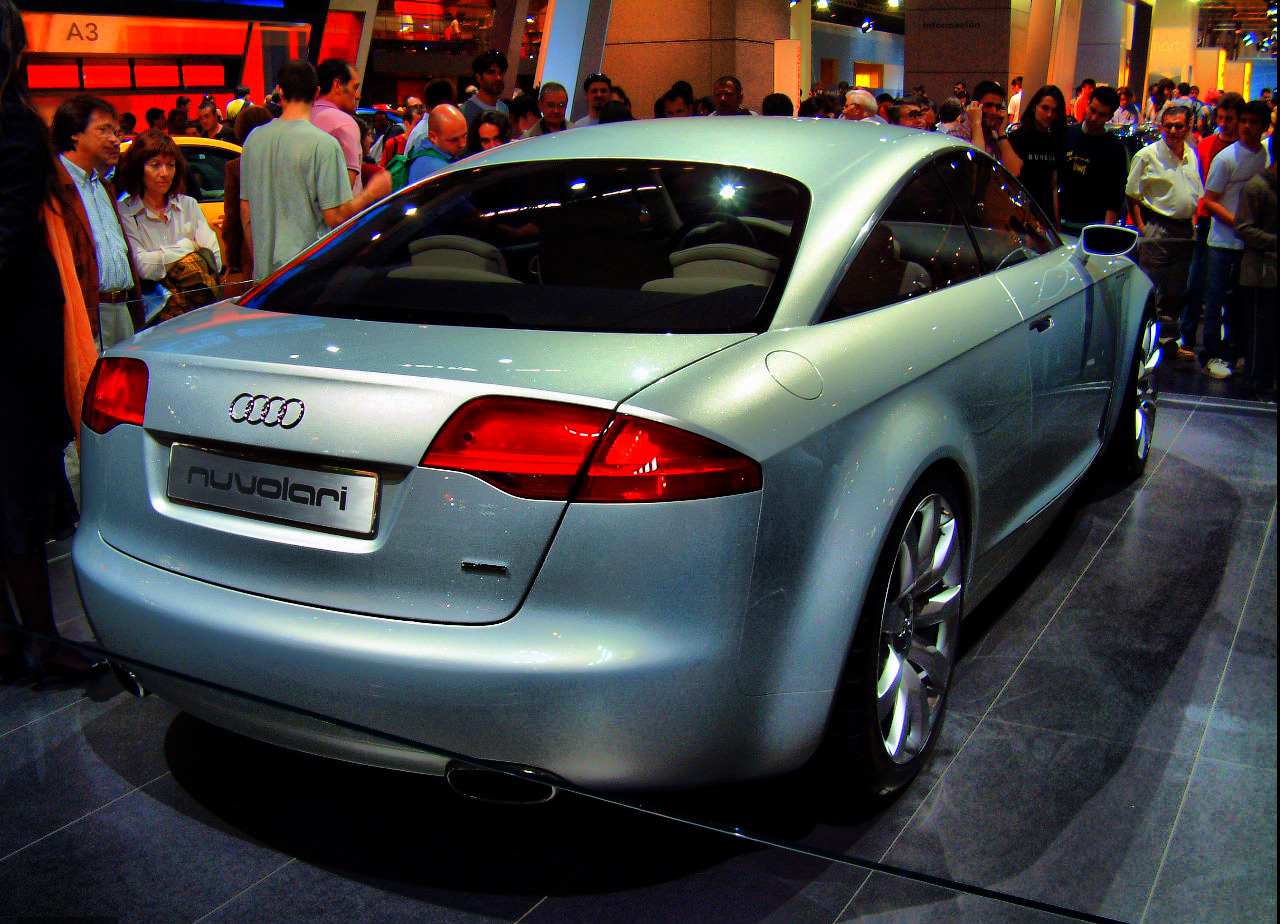
Rear view of the Nuvolari quattro.

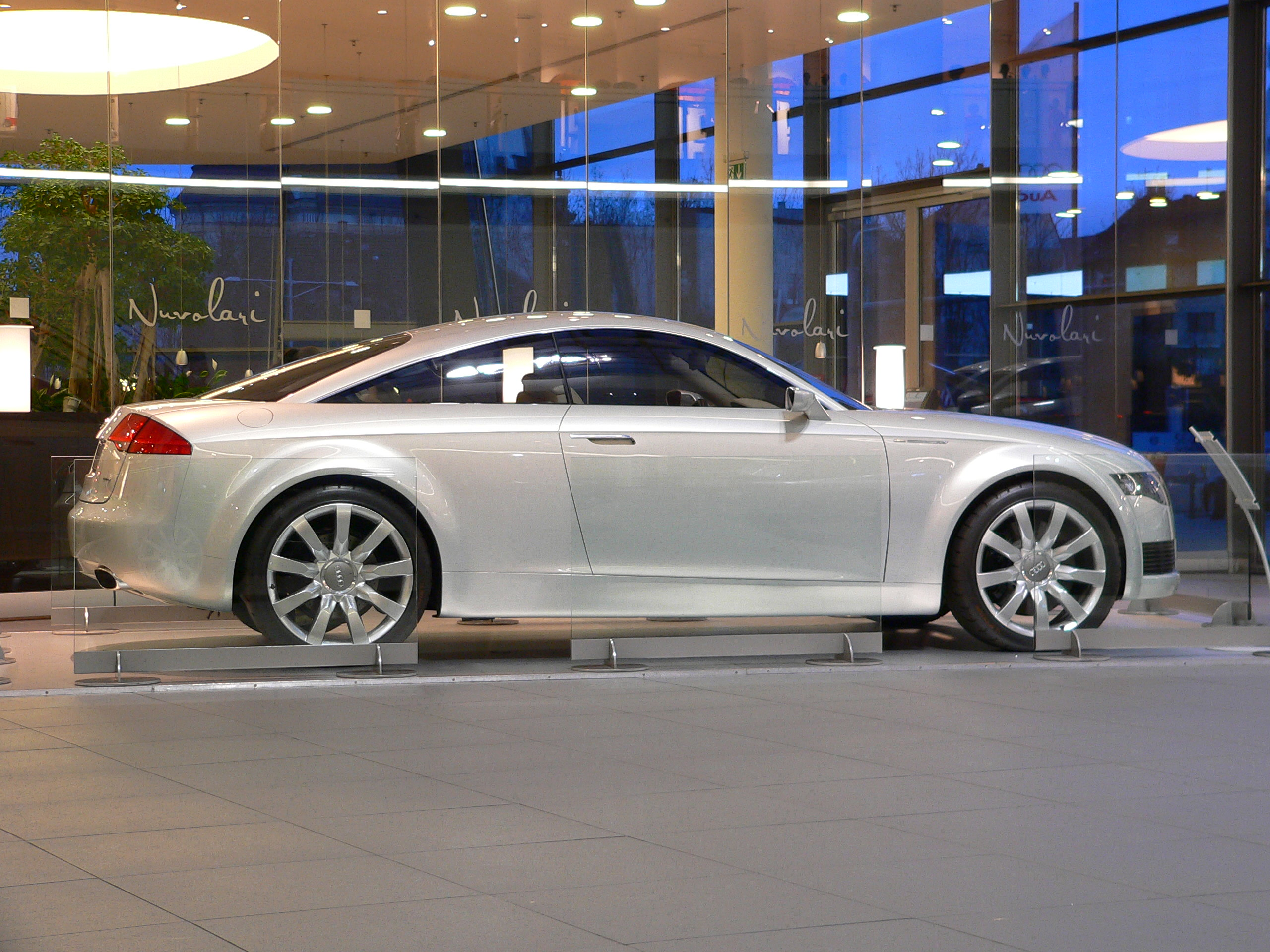
Rear 3/4 view

The Audi Nuvolari quattro (also known as the Audi Lisvina) was a concept car created by German automaker Audi. The vehicle was introduced at the 2003 Geneva Motor Show, the second of three Audi concept cars shown in 2003, after the Pikes Peak quattro and ahead of the Le Mans quattro.

The Nuvolari quattro had a 5.0 L twin-turbocharged V10 Fuel Stratified Injection (FSI) engine rated at 441 kW (600 PS; 591 bhp) and 750 N⋅m (553 lbf⋅ft). The car used Audi's Torsen-based quattro permanent four-wheel drive system.

The Nuvolari quattro was named after Tazio Nuvolari.

Audi showed the Nuvolari quattro with LED headlights, one of the first cars to have them.
