= Audi Le Mans quattro =

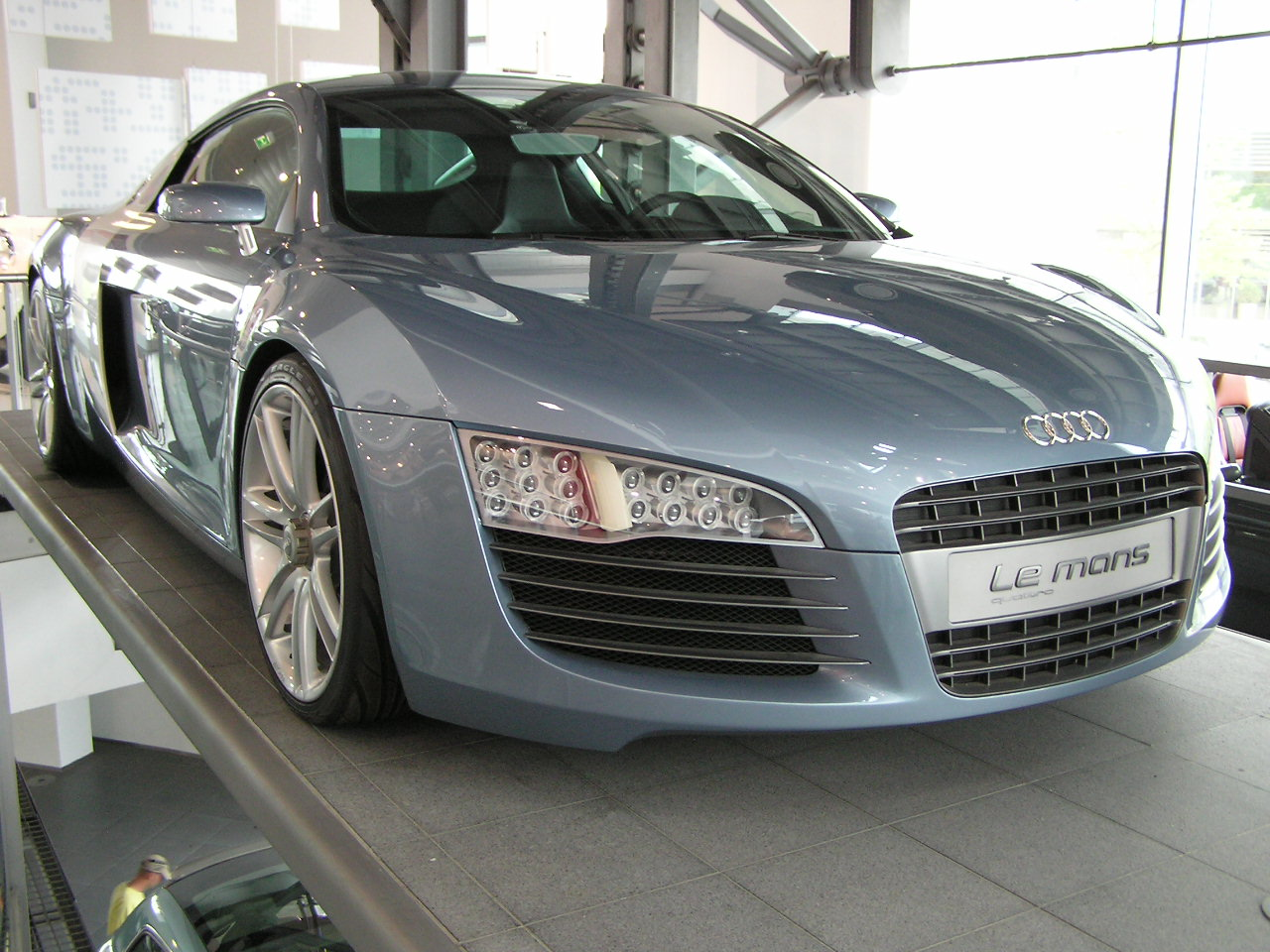

Overview
- Manufacturer: Audi AG
- Production: 2003
- Assembly: Neckarsulm, Germany
- Designer: Bernhard Voll (project leader); Rüdiger Kiehn (design project manager); Frank Lamberty (exterior designer); Jens Sieber (interior design)

Body and chassis
- Class: Concept car
- Body style: 2-door coupé
- Layout: Mid engine, quattro permanent all-wheel drive
- Related: SEAT Cupra GT; Lamborghini Gallardo; Audi R8 (Type 42)

Powertrain
- Engine: 5.0 L DOHC twin-turbocharged TFSI V10
- Transmission: 6-speed automated manual

Dimensions
- Wheelbase: 2,649 mm (104.3 in)
- Length: 4,369 mm (172.0 in)
- Width: 1,900 mm (74.8 in)
- Height: 1,245 mm (49.0 in)
- Curb weight: 1,530 kg (3,370 lb)

Chronology
- Predecessor: Audi Rosemeyer
- Successor: Audi R8

The Audi Le Mans quattro is a concept car, developed by German automobile manufacturer Audi, for presentation at the 2003 Frankfurt Motor Show, to celebrate Audi's three successive wins at the arduous 24 Hours of Le Mans endurance race in 2000, 2001, and 2002. It was the third and final concept car designed by Audi in 2003, following the Pikes Peak quattro and the Nuvolari quattro.

Audi's subsidiary quattro GmbH subsequently decided to produce the Audi Le Mans Quattro as a production road car, calling it the R8, naming it after Audi's R8 LMP race car, which is notable for being one of the most successful cars in the history of the 24 Hours of Le Mans with five overall wins.

== Design and technical ==
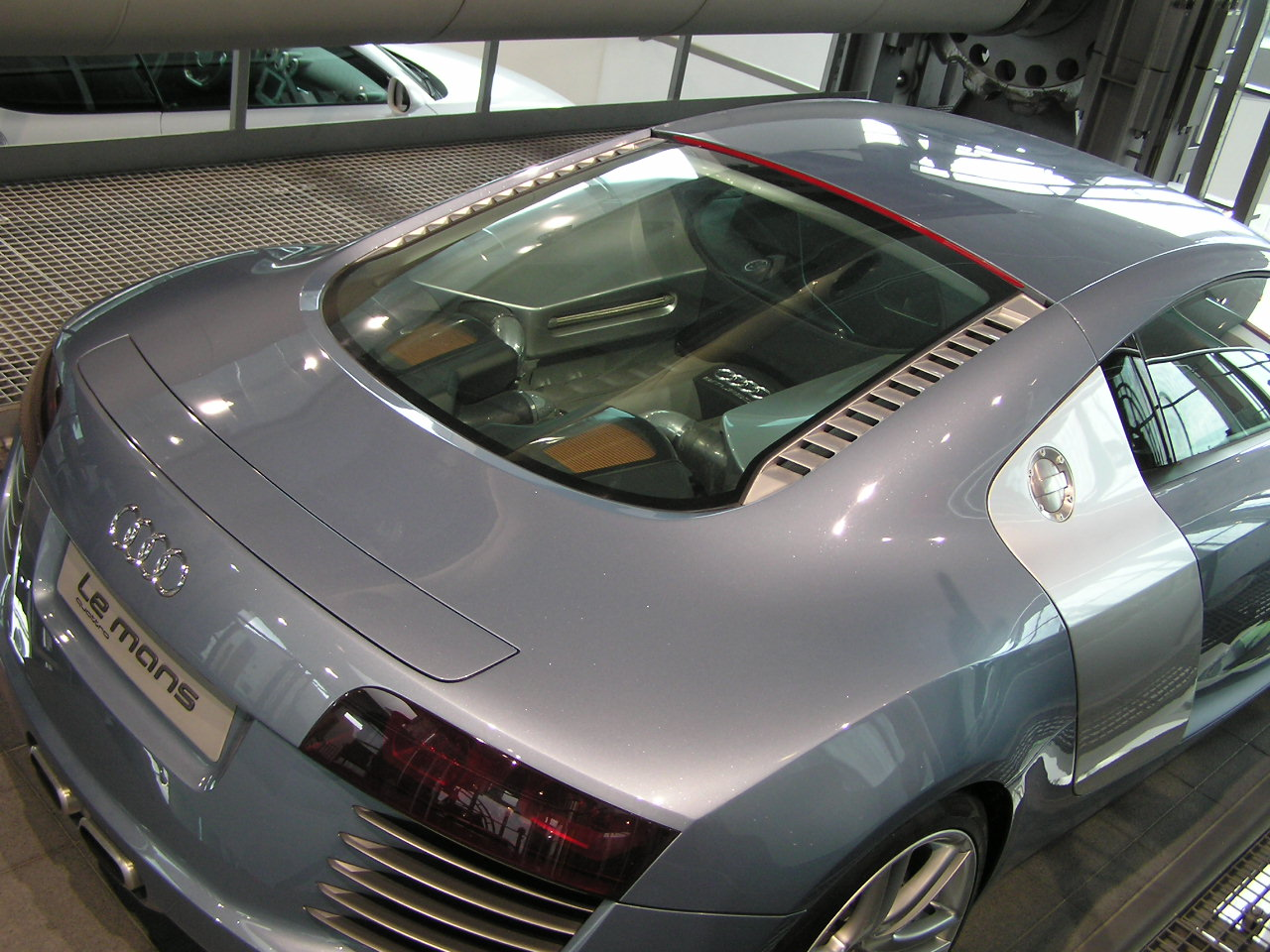
Engine bay

The Audi Le Mans quattro has a number of high-technology features, including the headlights composed entirely of light-emitting diodes (LEDs). The structural framework of the body, the Audi Space Frame, shared with the Lamborghini Gallardo, is made entirely of aluminium, while the outer skin is made out of carbon fibre and aluminium. The car also features an electronically controlled rear spoiler that raises at 70 mph (110 km/h).

The Le Mans quattro featured the magnetic ride magneto rheological dampers, also installed in the latest TT, which gives the car a firmer and more responsive drive and improved handling characteristics. In Audi tradition, the car features quattro permanent four-wheel drive to optimise traction and handling.

The Le Mans quattro's and Gallardo’s engine (both were development of C6 RS 6’s engine) have the same displacement but using different cylinder heads and twin-turbochargers and Fuel Stratified Injection technology, resulting in the high output of 449 kW (610 PS; 602 hp), and 750 N⋅m (553 lb⋅ft) of torque. The transmission is the six-speed automated manual transmission that was also shared with the Gallardo and developed by Volkswagen.

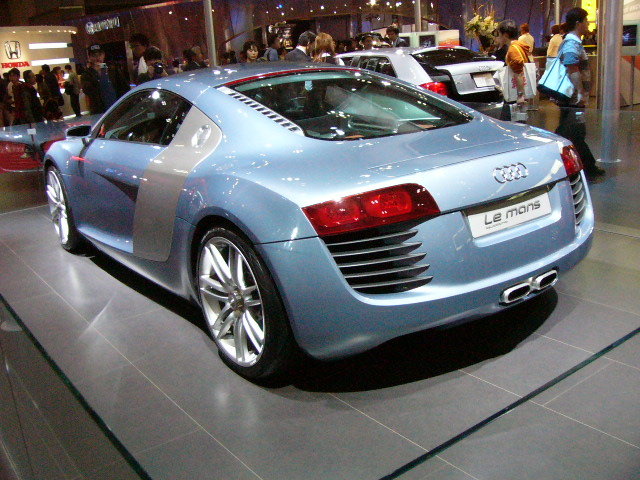
Rear view

The car showcased various Audi styling cues and technological details, planned to be used in future production Audi models.

== Specifications and performance ==
- Power: 449 kW (610 PS; 602 hp)
- Torque: 750 N⋅m (553 lb⋅ft)
- Engine: 5.0 L DOHC twin-turbocharged TFSI V10
- 0–100 km/h: 3.7 seconds
- Top speed: 345 km/h (214 mph)

== See also ==
- Audi RSQ
