= Audi RSQ =

The Audi RSQ concept vehicle series include:

== Audi RSQ (2004) ==
Audi RSQ
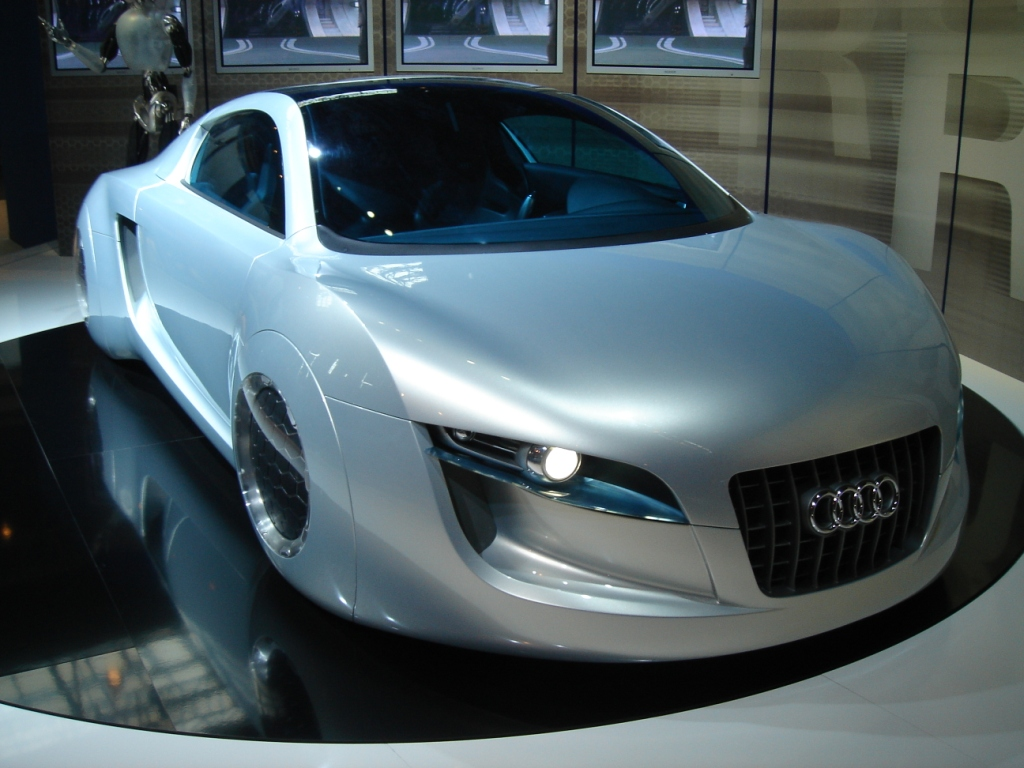

Overview
- Manufacturer: Audi AG
- Production: 2004
- Designer: Julian Hönig (Senior Exterior Designer at Audi AG)

Body and chassis
- Class: Concept car
- Body style: 2-door coupé
- Layout: mid engine, all wheel drive
- Platform: Fibreglass construction over aluminium space frame
- Doors: Reverse butterfly doors
- Related: Audi Le Mans quattro Audi TT; Lamborghini Gallardo

Powertrain
- Engine: 5.0 L twin-turbocharged FSI V10
- Transmission: 6-speed manual

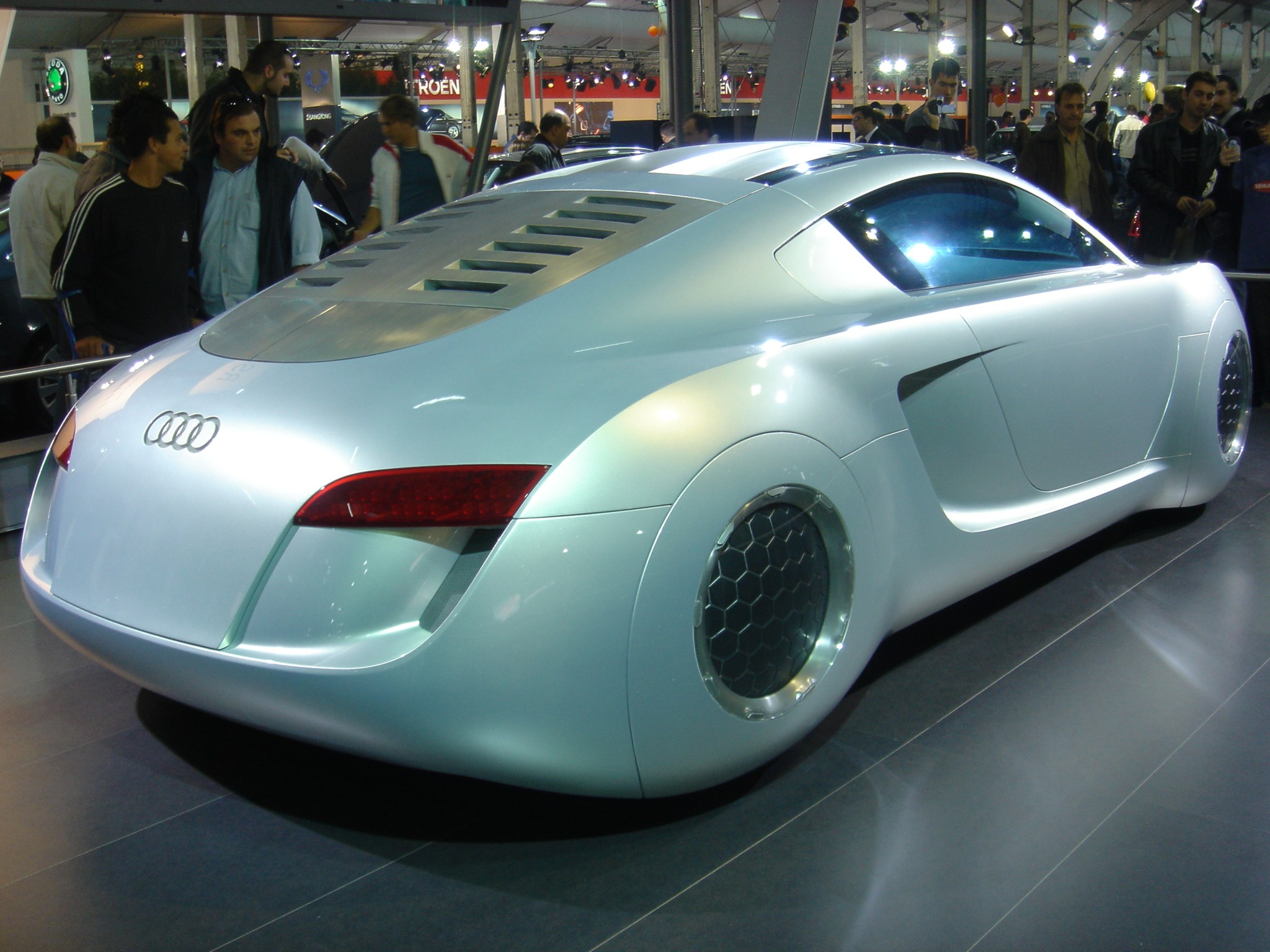
Rear view

The Audi RSQ is a mid-engined concept car developed by Audi AG for use as a product placement in the 2004 sci-fi film I, Robot. It is meant to depict a technologically advanced automobile in the Chicago cityscape from the year 2035.

This sports coupé is a visionary interpretation of Audi's typical automobile design. An important challenge presented to the designers was that in order for the car to have successful advertising for Audi as product placement, despite its extreme character, the car still had to be recognised by those audience members familiar with car designs as an Audi. To accommodate this demand, the engineers implemented a current Audi front-end design which includes the trapezoidal "Audi single-frame grille", the company's trademark four overlapping rings, and the Multi Media Interface (MMI) driver-to-car control system. The RSQ also includes special features suggested by film director Alex Proyas. The car uses spheres instead of conventional wheels. Its two reverse butterfly doors are hinged to the C-pillars of the body.

Although this kind of collaboration was a first for Audi, a similar project named the Lexus 2054 was developed by Lexus for use in the 2002 film Minority Report.

== Audi RSQ e-tron (2019) ==
Audi RSQ e-tron

Overview
- Manufacturer: Audi
- Production: 2019
- Designer: Jan Poliak

Body and chassis
- Class: Concept car
- Body style: 2-door coupé
- Layout: Individual-wheel drive
- Related: Audi RSQ

Powertrain
- Electric motor: 4 liquid-cooled permanent magnet synchronous electric motors placed at each wheel

The Audi RSQ e-tron is a concept car developed by Audi for use in the 2019 animated film Spies in Disguise.

According to Audi, the car was designed closely with Blue Sky Studios and features a "visionary design language and futuristic highlights including a hologram speedometer".

=== Marketing ===
As part of the Audi RSQ e-tron and Spies in Disguise movie launch, a video named 'Lunchbreak' was produced.

== See also ==
- Audi Le Mans quattro, a similar styled concept car
- Audi R8, a road car influenced by the RSQ's design and the production version of the Le Mans Quattro
- Audi RS Q e-tron, an off-road competition car debuted in 2021
