= Gerald Danovitch Saxophone Quartet =

Canadian music ensemble

- Origin: Montreal, Quebec, Canada
- Genres: Classical; Jazz
- Years active: 1968–1997
- Past members: Gerald Danovitch; Donald Hughes; Shane Nestruck; Abe Kestenberg; Peter Freeman; Nancy Newman; Janis Steprans

The Gerald Danovitch Saxophone Quartet (GDSQ) was a Canadian music ensemble formed in 1968. It was founded in Montreal by McGill University professor Gerald Danovitch.

== History ==
The saxophone quartet performed music in many styles, from Classical to Jazz. The original group members were Danovitch on soprano saxophone, Donald Hughes on alto, Shane Nestruck on baritone, and Abe Kestenberg on tenor. In 1976, Danovitch's student, Peter Freeman, took the place of Donald Hughes, and in 1978, Nancy Newman became the baritone player for the quartet in place of Shane Nestruck. Janis Steprans, also a student of Danovitch, began performing with the group in 1994.

In 1983, GDSQ won the du Maurier Search for Stars Contest organized by the du Maurier Council for the Performing Arts. In 1986, the quartet performed Pierre Max Dubois' concerto for saxophone quartet and strings with the Orchestre Métropolitain, conducted by the composer.

In 1988, the quartet performed at the ninth World Saxophone Congress, in Tokyo, Japan, and toured the Far East. In 1989, Paquito D'Rivera composed New York Suite for the GDSQ. CBC JazzImage also made a recording of the composition that same year, featuring the New York Saxophone Quartet.

After the sudden death of Gerald Danovitch from cancer in 1997, Newman and Kestenberg formed the Phoenix Saxophone Quartet. They broadcast a tribute to Danovitch on 8 January 1999 on the CBC Radio 2 program In Performance.

== Discography ==
1985 – Esquisses. Dubois Quatuor – M. Perrault Esquisses québécoises – McGill University Records 85022
1986 – Jones Three Preludes and a Fugue. 5-ACM 24
1987 – Gerald Danovitch Saxophone Quartet – CBC Records [1018]
1988 – Patriquin Earthpeace One. L. and I. Zuk piano. A Tempo 29588 (cass)
1989 – Free Trade. D. Matthews – Arnold – D'Rivera – et al. New York Saxophone Quartet. CBC JazzImage 2-0118 (CD)
1991 – Celebration: One Hundred and Fifty Years of the Saxophone. – featuring Eugene Rousseau – McGill University Records 750042-2 (CD)
