= The Valentino Orchestra =

Canadian big band

- Genres: Jazz
- Years active: 1996–2002
- Labels: Just a Memory
- Past members: Andrew Homzy; Boris Khodorkovsky; Bruce Lochhead; Chester Doxas; George Doxas; Gerald Danovitch; Jeff Fong; Jim Doxas; Michael Cartile; Pamela Fong; Yosef Tamir

The Valentino Orchestra is a Canadian 17-piece pre-swing style big band formed in Montreal in 1996 and led by musicologist and composer Andrew Homzy. Gerald Danovitch was the lead alto player until he died in 1997.

The Valentino Orchestra—named after Rudolph Valentino—bases its repertoire of "sophisticated swing" on the American popular music—compositions by Jerome Kern, George Gershwin, Cole Porter, Hoagy Carmichael, and the many others who in the Jazz Age established what is often called the Great American Songbook. Most of the music performed by the band was drawn stylistically from the period between the two world wars, and performed accordingly: often with exaggerated "old style" pre-swing era rhythm.

The band performs the original musical settings of these songs: the arrangements that were written for the dance bands and hotel orchestras of the 1920s and 1930s, complete with the string section: two violins and a viola.

== History ==
In 1995, jazz musicologist, composer, and arranger Andrew Homzy, together with music educator and bass player George Doxas, invited saxophonist Gerald Danovitch to start a pre-swing era jazz band. Homzy introduced his large collection of Duke Ellington stock arrangements. George Doxas and Gerald Danovitch invited several friends and students to try the sound of this vintage jazz project. Danovitch at first was designated to supervise the rehearsals, as he had the most practical expertise in performing the music of 1920s and 1930s, but later Danovitch led the saxophone section.

After months of rehearsal led by Homzy, the band started to record in George Doxas's home studio. The recording was an experiment which attracted the attention of Justin Time Records. After releasing their first album, My Foolish Heart, the band was invited to perform at many venues.

The Valentino Orchestra performed at the du Maurier stage of the Montreal International Jazz Festival in 1997 and 1998 in front of 50,000 people and on other stages in 1999 and 2002. They also performed in Ottawa in 1998.

== Discography ==
- My Foolish Heart (Just a Memory, 1996)
- Feelin' No Pain (Just a Memory, 1997)
- Daybreak Express (Just a Memory, 2000)
