= Coral Egan =

Canadian singer

Coral Egan is a Canadian jazz and pop singer. She is most noted as a two-time Juno Award nominee, receiving nominations for Vocal Jazz Album of the Year at the Juno Awards of 2003 for her album The Path of Least Resistance, and Adult Contemporary Album of the Year at the Juno Awards of 2014 for The Year He Drove Me Crazy. Her voice is recognized as the vocals for the English opening & closing theme songs for the 1999 animated cartoon Cybersix.

The daughter of musician and composer Karen Young, she began her career as a backing vocalist on some of her mother's recordings and performing as a solo folk artist. She released The Path of Least Resistance, her own solo debut, in 2002, and followed up with the albums My Favorite Distraction (2004), Magnify (2007) and The Year He Drove Me Crazy (2012).

In 2015, Egan was diagnosed with Guillain–Barré syndrome. During and after her recovery, Egan and Young collaborated on Missa Campanula, a polychoral project which they performed at the 2016 Montreal Jazz Festival, and on the 2017 album Dreamers.
