= Audi R8 =

Mid-engine sports car made by Audi

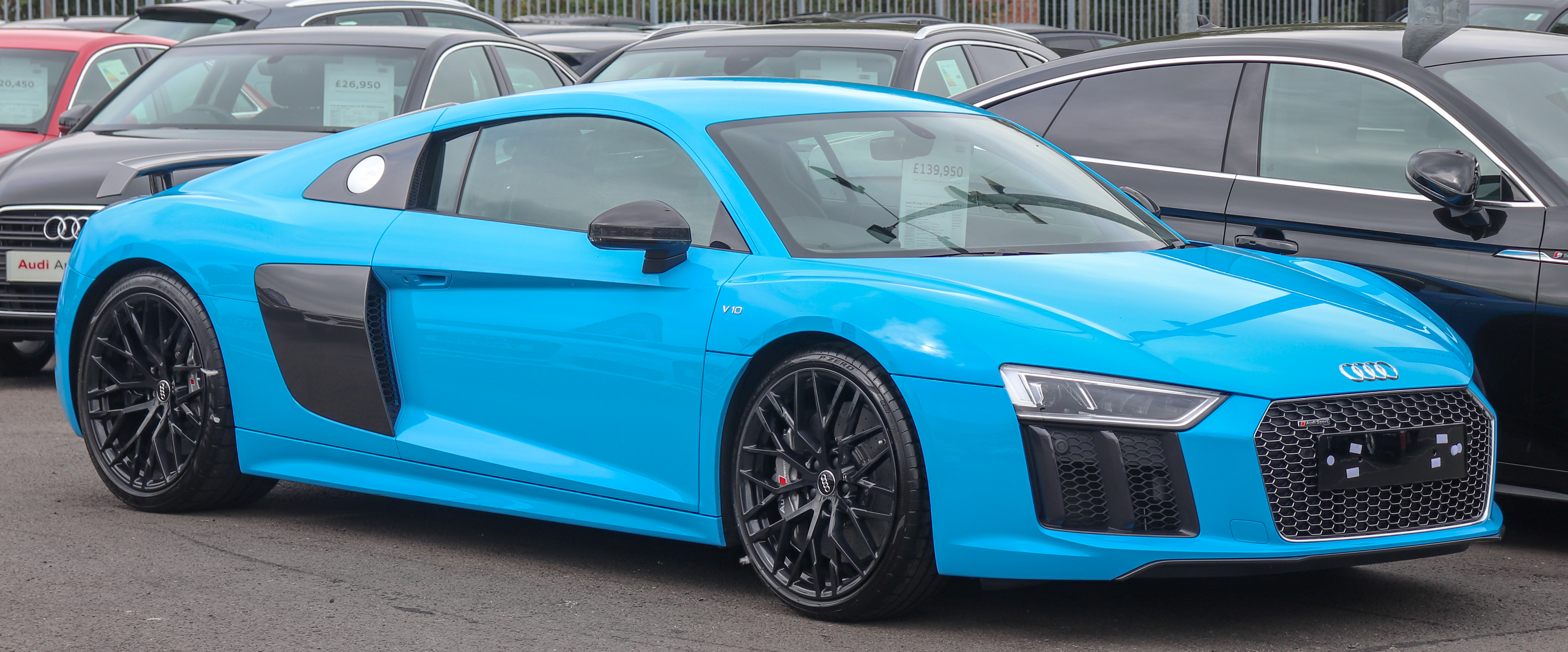
- Audi R8 V10 Plus (Type 4S)

Overview
- Manufacturer: Audi (Audi Sport GmbH)
- Production: June 2006 – March 2024 (44,430 units)
- Model years: 2007–2024

Body and chassis
- Class: Sports car (S)
- Body style: 2-door coupé 2-door convertible (spyder)
- Layout: Longitudinal mid-engine, rear-wheel-drive / all-wheel-drive

The Audi R8 is a mid-engine, 2-seater sports car, which uses Audi's trademark quattro permanent all-wheel drive system. It was introduced by the German car manufacturer Audi AG in 2006. Production ended in the first quarter of 2024.

The car is exclusively designed, developed, and manufactured by Audi AG's private subsidiary company manufacturing high performance automotive parts, Audi Sport GmbH (formerly quattro GmbH), and was inspired by the Lamborghini Gallardo albeit the second generation is built using the Huracán platform. The fundamental construction of the R8 is based on the Audi Space Frame, and uses an aluminium monocoque which is built using space frame principles. The car is built by Audi Sport GmbH in a newly renovated factory at Audi's 'aluminium site' at Neckarsulm in Germany. At the time it was introduced in 2006, the R8 became the first production car with full-LED headlamps.

== First generation (2006; Type 42) ==
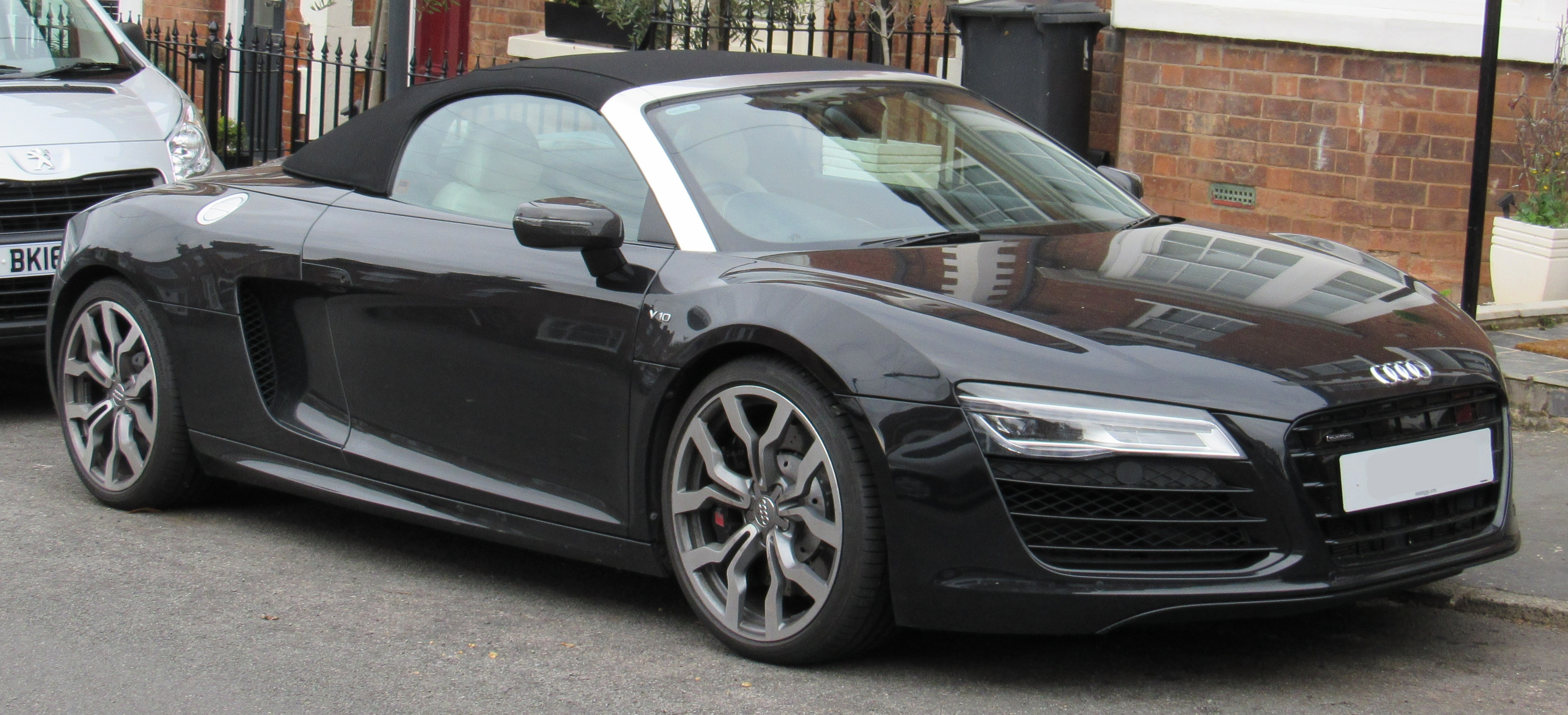
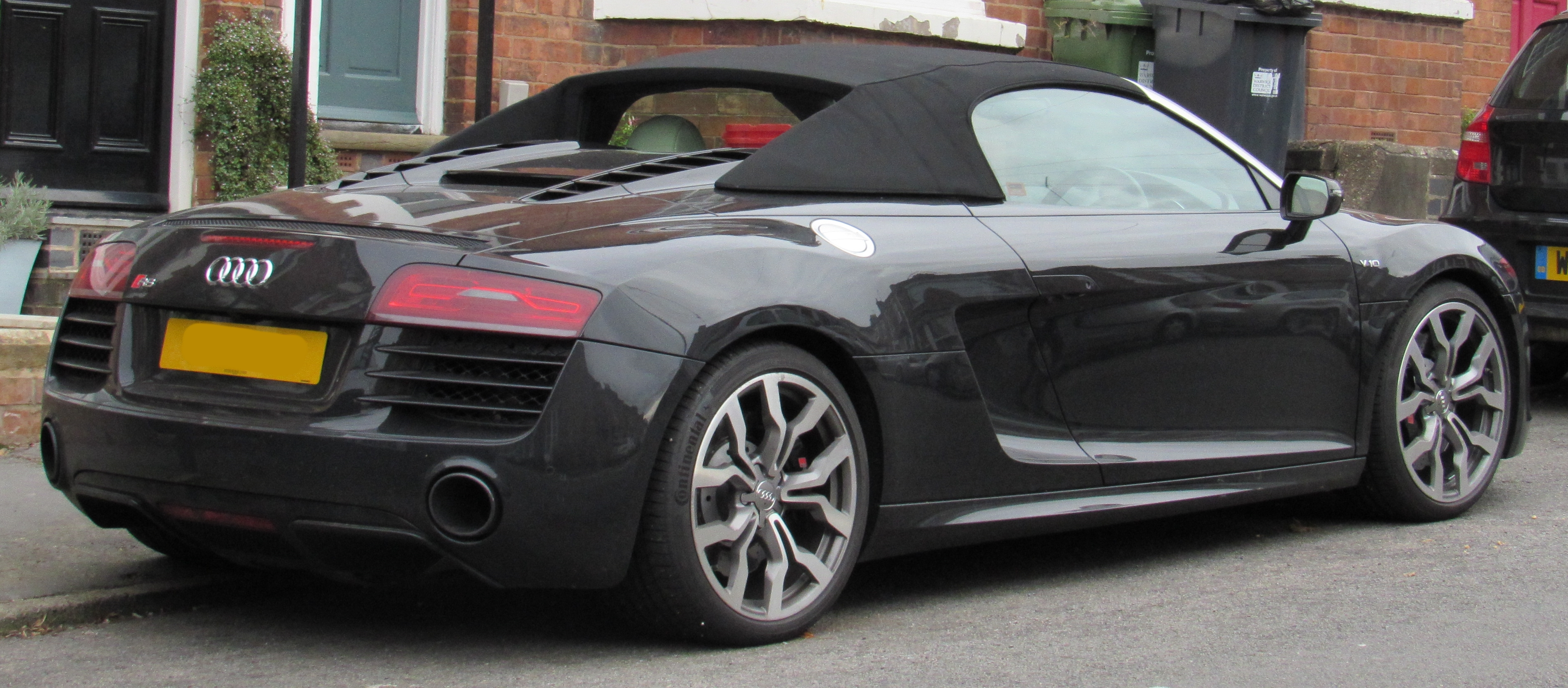
Audi R8 5.2 FSI Spyder

The Audi R8, based on the Audi Le Mans quattro concept car (designed by Frank Lamberty and Julian Hoenig) first appeared at the 2003 International Geneva Motor Show and the 2003 Frankfurt International Motor Show. The R8 road car was officially launched at the Paris Auto Show on 30 September 2006. There was some confusion with the name, which the car shares with the 24 Hours of Le Mans winning R8 Le Mans Prototype (LMP). Initial models included the R8 4.2 FSI coupé (with a V8 engine) and R8 5.2 FSI coupé (with a V10 engine). Convertible models, called the Spyder by the manufacturer, were introduced in 2008, followed by the high-performance GT model introduced in 2011. The Motorsport variants of the R8 were also subsequently introduced from 2008 onwards. An all-electric version called the e-Tron started development but would only reach production stage when the second generation model would be introduced.

6-time 24 Hours of Le Mans winner Jacky Ickx described the R8 as "the best handling road car today".

The car received a facelift in 2012 and a new model called the V10 Plus was now added to the range. Production of the Type 42 ended in August 2015.

== Second generation (2015; Type 4S) ==
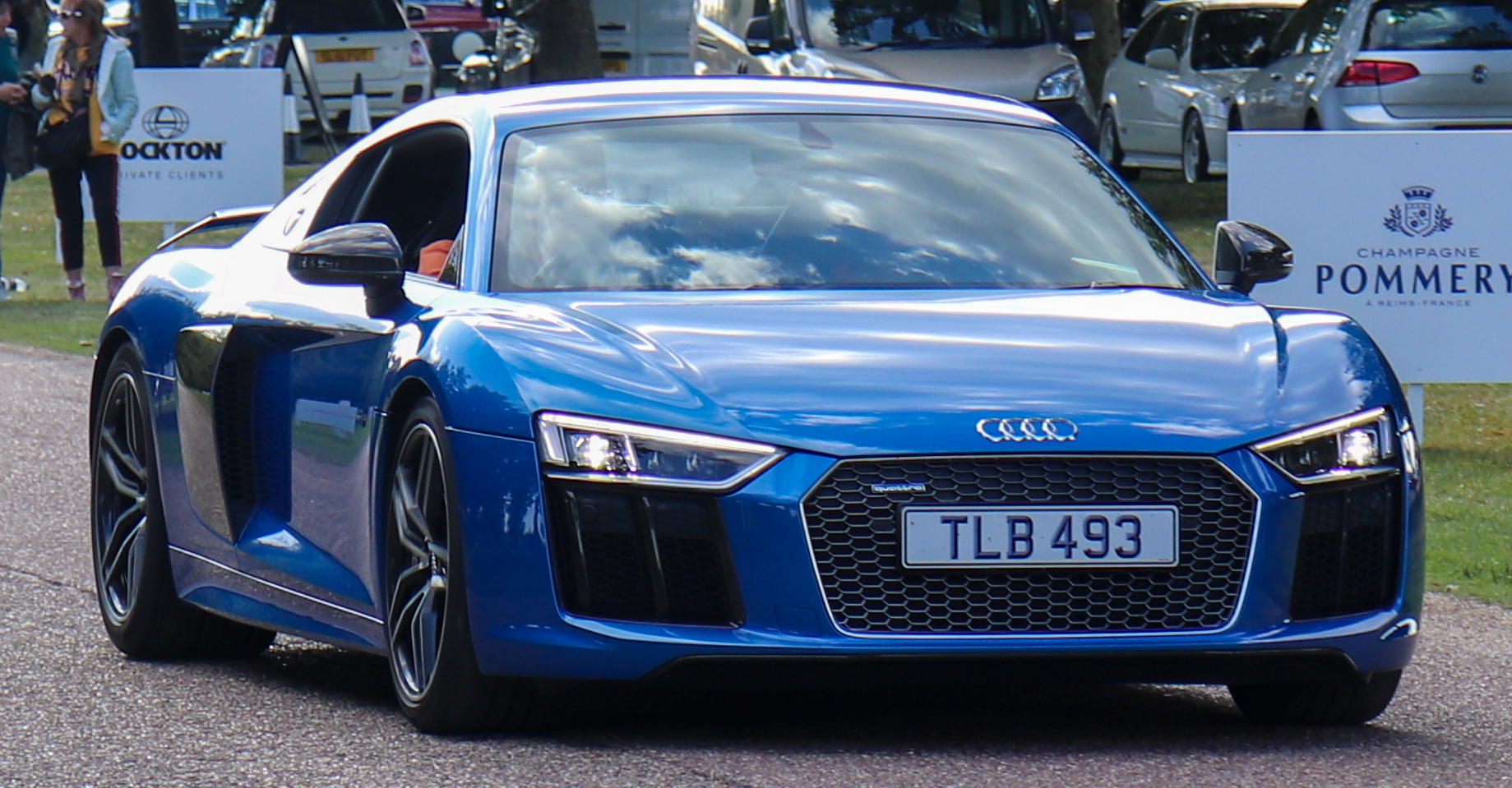
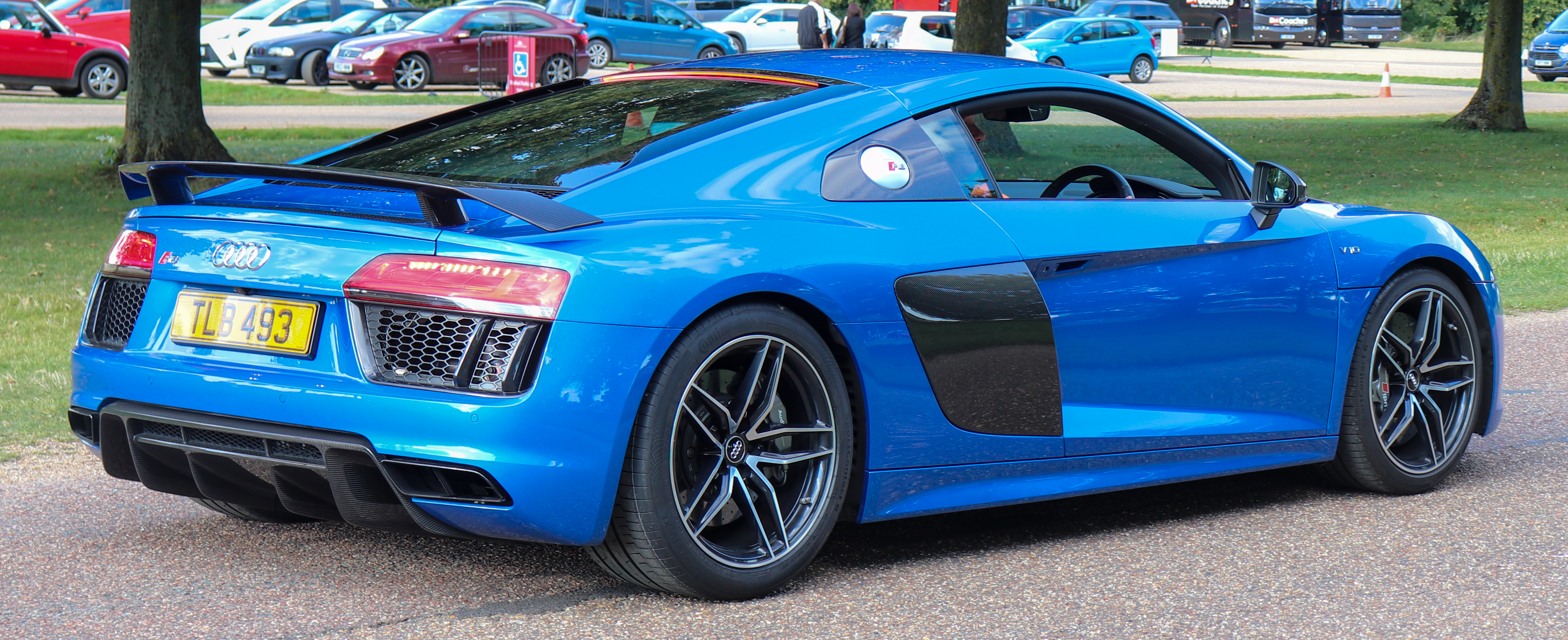
Audi R8 5.2 FSI coupé

The second generation of the R8 (model code: Type 4S) was unveiled at the 2015 Geneva Motor Show and is based on the Modular Sports System platform shared with the Lamborghini Huracán. The development of the Type 4S commenced in late 2013 and was completed in late 2014 (2015 model year in Europe, 2017 model year in the US). Initial models included the all-electric e-Tron and the V10 5.2 FSI along with the V10 plus. Unlike its predecessor, there was no manual transmission available and the entry-level V8 trim was also dropped. In 2016, the convertible (Spyder) variant was added to the line up which was initially available in the base V10 trim. In mid-2017, the high performance V10 plus Spyder was added to the range. A rear-wheel-drive model called the R8 RWS was introduced.

In 2017, Audi introduced the R8 V10 plus "Exclusive Edition," a limited production run of 25 units exclusively for the United States market. This model was the first Audi production vehicle in the United States to feature laser headlight technology. The laser high-beam module, which requires FDA approval for use in the U.S. due to its laser emission, supplements the standard full LED headlights and is activated at speeds above 40 mph (64 km/h) to significantly increase visibility range. The Exclusive Edition is distinguished by a Quantum Gray exterior paint finish, a Titanium Black-optic exterior package, and a Solar Orange accent stripe on the carbon fiber sideblades. The interior features a "Black/Signal Orange" leather package, a diamond-tufted Alcantara headliner, and illuminated carbon matte door sills inscribed with "one of 25."

In 2018 (2020 model year in the US), the R8 received a mid-cycle refresh with mechanical and exterior changes. The newer and more aggressive design language carried over from famous Audi models of the past and its appearance is slightly more angular up front. The refreshed model had substantial performance improvements over its predecessor. The base R8 gets a power boost from 532 hp to 562 hp, while the V10 Plus was renamed V10 Performance Quattro and the engine saw a power increase by 10 hp (7 kW), now up to 612 hp. 2023 R8 GT is last R8 with 620 hp limited to 333 units.

The Audi R8 e-tron (2015) was an all-electric version of the second-generation R8. Unlike the earlier 2010 prototype based on the first-generation R8, it actually entered production, but only on a small scale, with less than 100 units sold. It featured a 92-kWh battery.

== Production, available markets and sales ==
To produce the R8 at Audi Sport GmbH, 70 workers fit 5,000 different parts by hand. The factory at Neckarsulm, redeveloped at a cost of €28 million, usually produces between eight and fifteen cars a day, up to a maximum daily output of 29 cars. Ninety-five lasers inspect the entire car in five seconds to ensure that over 220 measurements are within 0.1 millimetres of the programmed plans.

Worldwide sales (production)
Year	World	US	Europe	Canada
2005	6			
2006	164		80	
2007	4,125	240	2,035	34
2008	5,656	900	2,935	155
2009	2,101	699	1,656	152
2010	3,485	799	1,632	137
2011	3,551	1,145	1,278	147
2012	2,241	802	1,046	116
2013	2,500	813	1,021	111
2014	2,214	735	859	116
2015	2,074	495	1,108	89
2016	3,688	736	1,428	158
2017	3,179	772		225 (Jan–Nov)
2018	1,764	961		
2019	2,121	577		
2020	1,517	581		
2021	1,679	649		
2022	1,097	288		
2023	2,127	441		
2024		305		
Total	45,289 (2005–2023)	11,938 (2007–2024)	15,078 (2006–2016)	1,436 (2007–Nov 2017)

- In Asia, the R8 is available in India, Israel, Japan, Taiwan, Bahrain, Kuwait, South Korea, Philippines, Thailand, Pakistan, Hong Kong and Vietnam, and has been available in China, United Arab Emirates, Singapore, Malaysia, and Indonesia since 2008.
- European statistics include sales from the following countries: Austria, Belgium, Cyprus, Czech Republic, Denmark, Estonia, Finland, France, Germany, Great Britain, Greece, Hungary, Iceland, Ireland, Italy, Latvia, Lithuania, Luxembourg, Netherlands, Norway, Poland, Portugal, Romania, Slovakia, Slovenia, Spain, Sweden, Switzerland.

== Marketing ==
=== Marvel Cinematic Universe ===
The R8 became the personal vehicle for Tony Stark (played by Robert Downey Jr.) throughout six films in the Marvel Cinematic Universe. Type 42 models were used in the Iron Man Trilogy with a V8 in Iron Man, a V10 Spyder in Iron Man 2, and an e-tron prototype in Iron Man 3. Type 4S models appeared in later Marvel Studios movies with 2016 V10 Plus models in Avengers: Age of Ultron and Captain America: Civil War and a Spyder model in Spider-Man: Homecoming.

== See also ==
- Lamborghini Huracán (built on same platform)
- Audi Le Mans quattro
- Audi S and RS models
- Lamborghini Gallardo (built on same platform)
