= Michel Donato =

Canadian jazz musician

Michel Donato (born August 25, 1942) is a Canadian jazz double bass player, composer, and singer and pianist. According to the Canadian Encyclopedia, "[h]is association with both [Oscar] Peterson and [Bill] Evans marks Donato as one of Canada's foremost jazz bassists...". He was made a member of the Order of Canada in 2007.

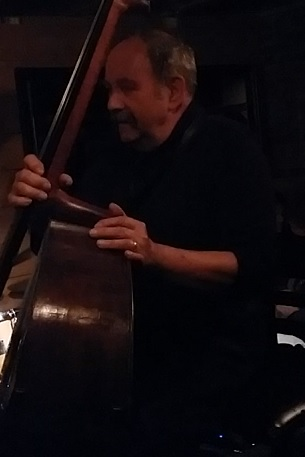
Michel Donato performing at the Dièse Onze club.

== Career ==
=== Early years ===
He grew up in a musical family, as his grandfather was a violinist and his father, Roland, was a saxophone, flute and piano player and dance band leader. Michel Donato studied accordion at age 10 and piano at age 12. He studied double bass from 1958 to 1961 at the Conservatoire de musique de Montréal (CMM) with Roger Charbonneau. After leaving CMM, he took private lessons with Thomas Martin.

=== Performing and teaching ===
In the start of the 1960s, he played some gigs with the Montreal Symphony Orchestra. He soon moved away from Classical music and focused on playing jazz and working as a studio musician in the Montreal music scene, where he gigged with Jazz Hot and Jazztek. He also played with Pierre Leduc and Lee Gagnon. He became associated with the jazz drummer Claude Ranger, as they often provided the rhythm section for shows. In 1968 to 1969, he joined the Montreal trio Aquarius Rising.

From 1969 to 1977 he moved to Toronto, and he played under Lenny Breau and accompanied Carol Britto and Bernie Senensky. From 1972 to 1973, he was in the Oscar Peterson Trio. In the 1970s, he did some shows with Bill Evans, but he decided not to become a full-time member of Evan's group. He did studio work with performers including Félix Leclerc, Nick Ayoub, Sonny Greenwich, Ian McDougall, Bruce Coburn, Dave Samuels, Bernie Senesky, Buddy De Franco, Gordie Fleming, Gilles Vigneault, and Ginette Reno.

From 1977 to 1990, Donato moved back to Montreal. In 1980, he started teaching bass at McGill University and the University of Montreal.

In the 1980s, he played in trios with Lorraine Desmarais and Oliver Jones. In 1984, he played with Oscar Peterson and the Montreal Symphony Orchestra. As well, he formed a duo with jazz singer Karen Young, playing bass and sometimes piano while she sang. In the 1980s, he did two albums with Young: "Karen Young\ Michel Donato" (1985) and "Contredanse" (1988).

In 1990, he collaborated with Young on another album, "En vol III". In the early 1990s, he did a duo collaboration with virtuoso Quebecois electric bassist Alain Caron from the jazz fusion band UZEB.

=== Awards ===
He won FIJM's Concours de Jazz de Montréal in 1982, a Félix Award in 1988, the Oscar Peterson trophy in 1995, and a Jutras award in 2001. He became a member of the Order of Canada in 2007; his award notes that "His technique, virtuosity and mastery have gained him a reputation that extends well beyond our borders."

== Discography ==
- Karen Young/Michel Donato with Karen Young (Justin Time, 1985)
- Contredanse (Justin Time, 1988)
- En Vol. III (Justin Time, 1990)
- Basse Contre Basse with Alain Caron (Avant Garde, 1992)
- De Toute Beauté with Alain Lamontagne (Transit, 1995)
- Maree Bass (Label Bleu, 1995)
- Setting the Standard with James Gelfand (DSM, 1996)
- Live (DSM/Unidisc, 1996)
- Second Time Around with Karen Young (Ursh, 1996)
- Setting the Standard Vol. 2 with James Gelfand (DSM, 1996)
- Matters of the Spirit with Reno De Stefano (DSM, 2001)
- Noel En Harmonie (Justin Time, 2004)
- Et Ses Amis Européens (Effendi, 2004)
- Happy Blue (2 Contrebasses) with Guillaume Bouchard (Zig Zag, 2006)
- Et Ses Amis Européens Vol. 2 (Effendi, 2007)
- Autour De Bill Evans with Frank Lozano (Effendi, 2011)
- Noel En Harmonie Vol. 2 (Justin Time, 2014)
