= Karen Young (Canadian singer) =

Singer-songwriter from Quebec, Canada

Karen Young (born June 19, 1951) is a singer, lyricist, composer and arranger from Quebec, Canada who has explored several different musical styles, including world music, classical, jazz, Latin, traditional, and medieval music.

== Career ==
Young was born in Montreal, Quebec. Starting in folk music with a medium chart hit Garden Of Ursh (1971) in the late 1960s, she switched to jazz in the mid-1970s with the successful bebop vocal group, Bug Alley. She was a member from 1975 to 1979. She played lead roles in the musical theatre productions Mata Hari and Angel, written by David Rimmer and Edward Knoll, in the early 1980s.

In the mid-to later 1980s, she was part of the renowned bass and voice duo, Young and Donato, with Montreal jazz bassist Michel Donato. Their album Young & Donato was nominated for a Juno Award 1985. The following album Contredanse won a Félix Award in category Best jazz album in Quebec in 1988. The duo had four tours from (1987–90) in France and 1989-90 in the USA, and also some gigs in 1989 in England.

She was touring with her bands mostly in Canada in the early 2000s, so at the Kaslo Jazz Festival (2003) with a psychedelic music style or as a member of Sylvain Provost Trio at Jazz en Rafale Festival 2008.

Her eclecticism and familiarity with world, classical and jazz styles allow her to present works ranging from traditional, Latin and contemporary jazz to, more recently, medieval (album Âme, corps et désir, 2007 ) and electro jazz (album Electro-Beatniks, 2009). Young established her own independent record label in 1991, Les Disques URSH. Since then, she has released nine records featuring combinations of artists from different musical backgrounds and traditions.

Young composed the musical soundtracks for Joseph’s Daughter, a film by Ilana Schwartz, The Road from Kampuchea by Anne Henderson and for Revoir Julie by Jeanne Crepeau. She was awarded another Félix Award in 2008 for Âme, Corps et Desir in the category "best classic vocal album". She has been touring also with jazz musicians Michel Donato (bass), Norman Lachapelle (bass), Éric Auclair (bass).

Karen's daughter, Coral Egan, is also a singer-songwriter and has released several jazz and pop albums; Coral has also given Karen a granddaughter.

== Discography ==
- 2018 - Portraits: Songs of Joni Mitchell (with Marianne Trudel)
- 2017 - Dreamers (with Coral Egan)
- 2015 - You make me feel so young (with Sylvain Provost and Normand Guilbeault)
- 2009 - Electro-Beatniks (with Eric Auclair)
- 2007 - Âme, Corps et Desir
- 2003 - La couleur du vent
- 2002 - Live in your living room
- 2000 - Le cantique des cantiques
- 1997 - Nice work if you can get it
- 1994 - Second time around
- 1993 - Good news on the crumbling walls
- 1992 - Karen Young
- 1990 - En vol III (with Michel Donato)
- 1988 - Contredanse (with Michel Donato)
- 1985 - Karen Young\ Michel Donato (with Michel Donato)
- 1981 - Karen Young
