= Arthur Romano (musician) =

Canadian saxophonist, clarinetist, oboist, english hornist and music educator

Arthur Romano (23 March 1914 in Naples – 16 January 1964 in Montreal) was a Canadian saxophonist, clarinetist, oboist, english hornist, and music educator of Italian birth. He is considered a pioneer in the classical repertoire for the saxophone.

== Career ==
Arthur Romano studied with Al Gallodoro in New York City and with Marcel Mule in France. From 1952-1962 he was a woodwind player in Montreal Symphony Orchestra; playing the english horn, oboe, and saxophone. He also appeared frequently with the Quebec Symphony Orchestra as a saxophonist during his career. He established the Romano Saxophone Quartet (RSQ) which appeared frequently on CBC Radio in the 1950s. The RSQ was the first professional saxophone quartet in the nation of Canada and it was active from 1949 until Romano's death in 1964. With this ensemble he performed the world premieres of several classical works for saxophone; including compositions by George Fiala, Alexander Brott, Michel Perrault, Jean Françaix, and Gabriel Pierné.

Romano was a professor of saxophone at the Conservatoire de musique du Québec à Montréal from 1949-1962 and taught on the music faculty of the Schulich School of Music at McGill University from 1955-1964. His pupils included Nick Ayoub, Gerald Danovitch, Frederick Nichols, Gilles Moisan, Lee Gagnon, Jacques Larocque, and Alvinn Pall; many of whom played at one time or another in the Romano Saxophone Quartet.

In addition to his work teaching and performing, Romano established the business Seaward Ltd. which did instrument repairs as well as sell instruments. After his death in 1964, the Université du Québec à Trois-Rivières and the Association of Saxophonists of North America established the Arthur Romano Competition; a composition competition which required contestants to create works that featured the saxophone.
