= List of Audi concept cars =

The following is a list of Audi concept cars.

== Concept cars ==
Year	Model	Designer	Image
1969	80 Prototype	Audi	
1969	100 LS Cabriolet	Karmann	
1973	Asso di Picche	Italdesign	
1974	Audi 100S coupe speciale	Pietro Frua	
1981	Auto 2000	Audi	
1981	Quartz Concept	Pininfarina	
1984	B12 80	Pininfarina	
1986	GT Cabriolet	Audi	
1986	300 Prototype		
1986	Sport quattro RS002 Group S	Audi	
1991	Avus quattro Concept	Audi	
1991	Quattro Spyder Concept	Audi	
1993	ASF	Audi	
1995	TT Concept	Audi	
1995	TTS Roadster Concept	Audi	
1997	Al_{2} Concept	Audi	
1997	A8 Coupe	Audi	
2000	Rosemeyer	Audi	
2000	Steppenwolf	Audi	
2001	Avantissimo	Audi	
2003	Nuvolari quattro	Audi	
2003	Le Mans quattro	Audi	
2003	Pikes Peak quattro		
2004	RSQ		
2005	Shooting Brake		
2006	Roadjet		
2007	A1 Metroproject quattro	Audi	
2007	Cross Coupé quattro		
2007	Cross Cabriolet quattro		
2008	R8 Le Mans Concept	Audi	
2008	A1 Sportback concept	Audi	
2009	A7 Sportback Concept	Audi	
2009	e-tron (Frankfurt)	Audi	
2010	e-tron (Detroit)	Audi	
2010	e-tron Spyder	Audi	
2010	quattro Concept	Audi	
2011	A2 Concept	Audi	
2011	A3 Concept	Audi	
2011	Urban Concept	Audi	
2011	Urban Spyder Concept	Audi	
2012	Crosslane Coupé	Audi	
2013	Nanuk Quattro Concept	ItalDesign	
2013	Sport quattro concept		
2014	TT Offroad		
2014	TT Sportback	Audi	
2014	Prologue	Audi	
2015	Audi A7 sportback h-tron (hydrogen fuel cell)	Audi	
2015	Prologue Allroad	Audi	
2015	e-tron quattro	Audi	
2016	h-tron Quattro Concept	Audi	
2017	Aicon	Audi	
2017	Elaine	Audi	
2017	Q8 Sport Concept	Audi	
2018	e-tron Vision Gran Turismo		
2018	Pop.Up Next	ItalDesign	
2018	PB18 e-tron	Audi	
2018	e-tron GT concept	Audi	
2019	RSQ e-tron		
2019	Q4 e-tron concept	Audi	
2019	AI:ME	Audi	
2019	AI:Trail	Audi	
2020	Q4 Sportback e-tron Concept	Audi	
2020	RS6 GTO Concept	Audi	
2021	A6 e-tron concept	Audi	
2021	Sky Sphere	Audi	
2021	Grandsphere	Audi	
2021	Urban Sphere	Audi	
2021	S1 e-tron quattro Hoonitron	Audi	
2023	Activesphere	Audi	
2025	Concept C	Audi	
