= Maserati Boomerang =

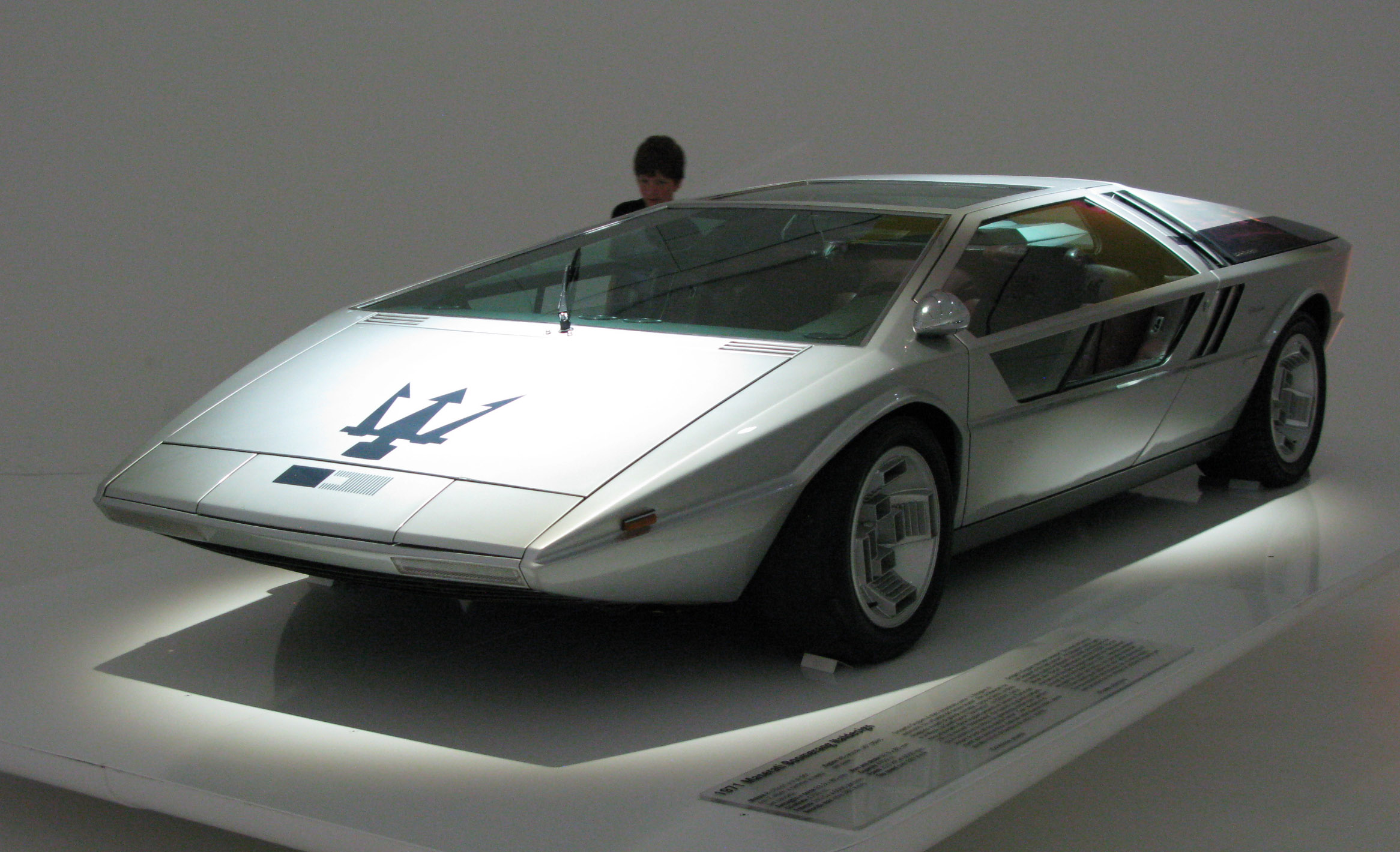
- Maserati Boomerang at Museo Casa Enzo Ferrari

Overview
- Manufacturer: Italdesign Giugiaro
- Production: 1972
- Assembly: Turin, Italy
- Designer: Giorgetto Giugiaro at Italdesign

Body and chassis
- Class: Concept car
- Body style: 2-door coupé
- Layout: Rear mid-engined, rear-wheel drive
- Related: Maserati Bora

Powertrain
- Engine: 4.7 L (4,719 cc) DOHC V8
- Transmission: 5-speed manual

Dimensions
- Wheelbase: 2,600 mm (102 in)
- Length: 4,342 mm (171 in)
- Width: 1,860 mm (73 in)
- Height: 1,070 mm (42 in)
- Curb weight: 1,400 kg (3,086 lb)

The Maserati Boomerang is a concept car designed by Giorgetto Giugiaro and produced by Italdesign. It was first revealed at the Turin Motor Show in 1971 as a non-functional Epowood model, but by the time of the 1972 Geneva Auto Show it was based on Maserati Bora chassis as a one-off.

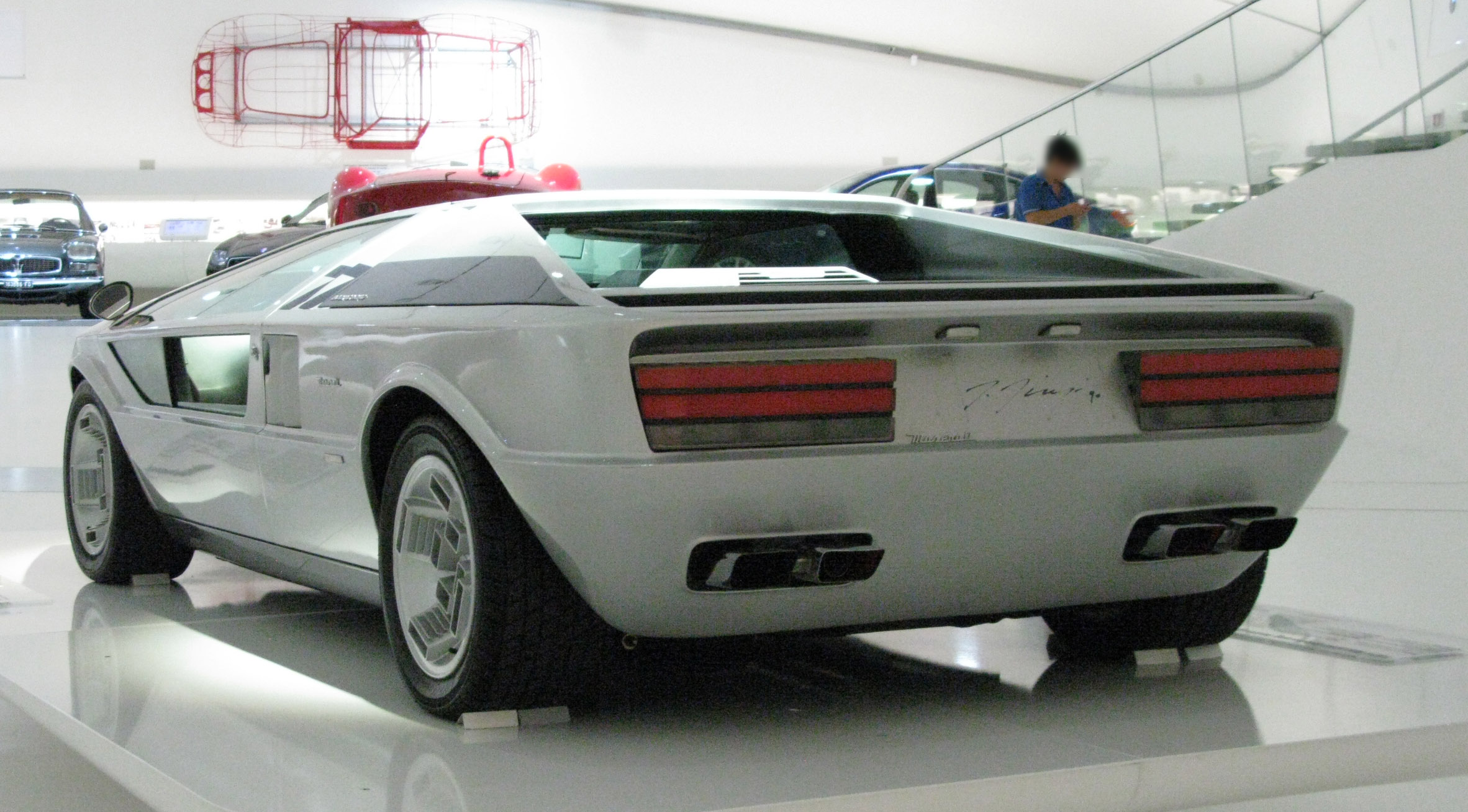
Maserati Boomerang (rear)

The Boomerang was registered as a road car, but it was intended as a one-off show car. It was shown in dozens of places, and after the 1974 car show in Barcelona it was sold to a private individual. In 1990, it was shown at the Bagatelle Concours in Paris, 1993 Concorso Italiano, Carmel (Calf.) and Pebble Beach, with a new owner and some restoration work having been done. It made an appearance again in 2000 at the Monterey Historic Automobile Races, and Pebble Beach - 50th Anniversary -, 2012 "BEST OF SHOW", May, Monte Carlo, Monaco, 2013 "BEST OF SHOW", October, Knokke, Belgium, 2014 "Paris Motor Show". On 5 September 2015, the Boomerang was auctioned by Bonhams at the Château de Chantilly, France, and sold for €3,335,000 (approximately US$3.7 million).

== Design ==
The design of the Boomerang would resonate through Giugiaro's future designs for many years. Its sharp angles and wedge shape could be easily recognised in the 1973 Audi Asso di Picche concept, 1973 VW Passat Mk1, 1974 VW Golf Mk1, 1976 Lotus Esprit and Medici II show car, 1979 Lancia Delta and Maserati Quattroporte III, as well as the 1976 designed and 1981 launched DeLorean.

== Specifications ==
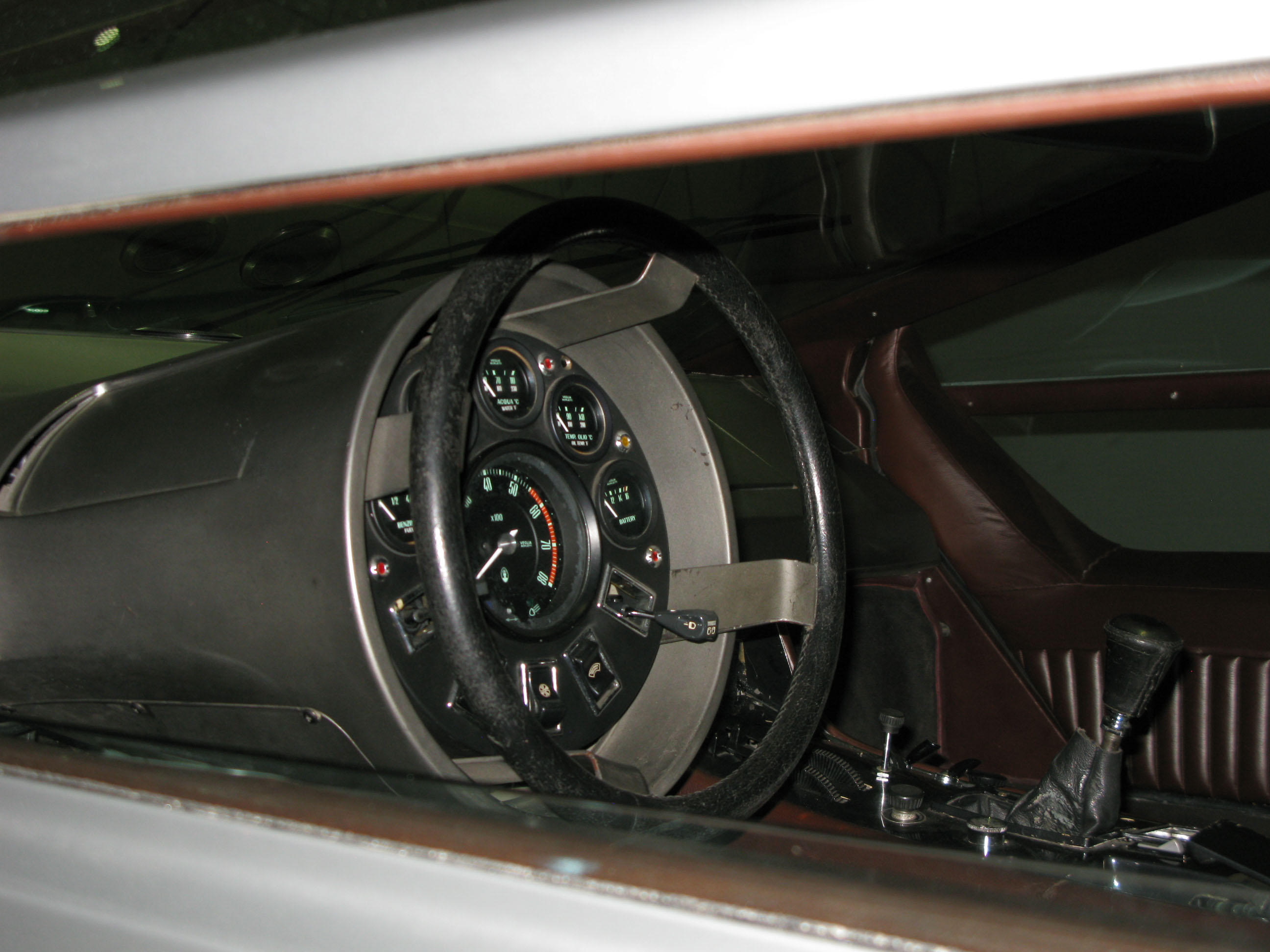
Steering wheel with gauges

The Boomerang is powered by a 4.7L V8 engine producing 310 hp (314 PS; 231 kW) and 460 N⋅m (339 lb⋅ft) of torque, driving the rear wheels and mated to a 5-speed manual transmission. The interior features a unique dashboard layout where the steering wheel and gauge cluster are part of a single console that emerges from the dash, and the steering wheel rotates around the stationary gauges.

== Other media ==
The Boomerang featured prominently in a 2014 series of Louis Vuitton print and video ads, with photographs by Jürgen Teller showing the car and fashion models at the Giardini della Biennale (Venice).
