= Audi Steppenwolf =

Overview
- Manufacturer: Audi
- Production: 2000

Body and chassis
- Class: Concept car
- Body style: 3-door crossover SUV
- Layout: Front-engine, four-wheel drive
- Platform: Volkswagen Group PQ34

Powertrain
- Engine: 3.2 L V6
- Transmission: 6-speed manual

The Audi Steppenwolf was a concept car produced by Audi and presented at the Paris Motor Show in 2000.

The Steppenwolf was a study for a three-door compact crossover SUV based on the Volkswagen Group PQ34 platform used in the contemporary Audi A3 and Audi TT. Powered by a 3.2L V6 engine with four-wheel drive, the Steppenwolf had several novel features, including four-level adjustable air suspension (similar to the Audi allroad quattro), a removable carbon fibre hardtop or optional soft top, and an electro-hydraulic parking brake.

The Steppenwolf didn't result directly in a production model. However, six years later, Audi presented the Audi Cross Coupé quattro, another concept car in the same class, which was the basis of a production version called the Audi Q3 for 2011.

== Sources ==
- "Design Concept: Audi Steppenwolf". www.audi.co.uk. Archived from the original on 2009-08-17.
- "Audi "Steppenwolf" project". AudiWorld. 2000-09-28. Archived from the original on 13 October 2008.
