= Audi Quattro Spyder Concept =

Audi Quattro Spyder
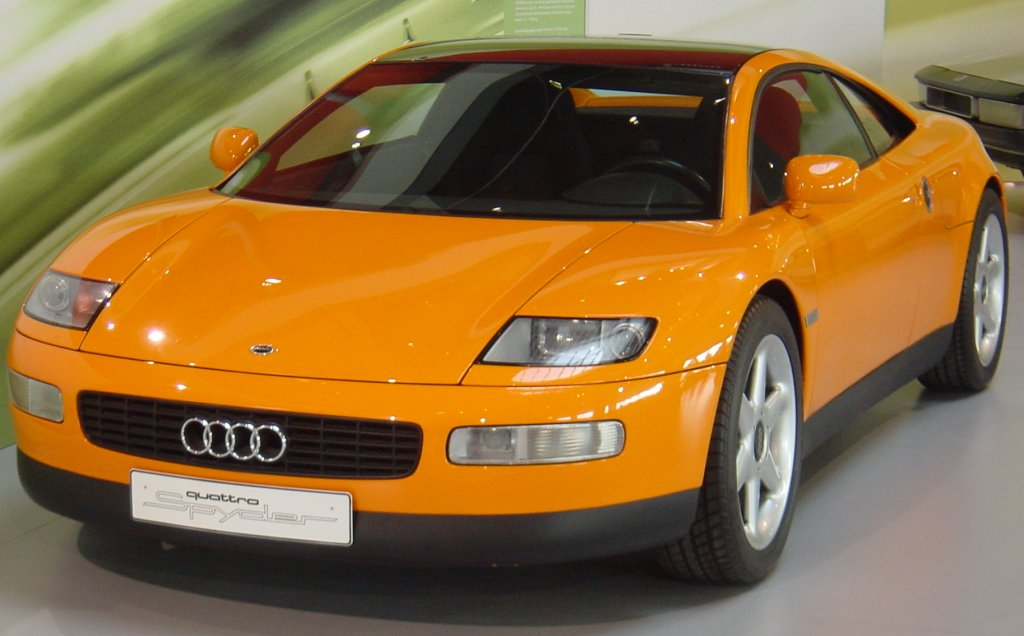
- Audi Quattro Spyder

Overview
- Manufacturer: Audi AG
- Model years: 1991

Body and chassis
- Class: Concept Car
- Body style: 2-door roadster
- Layout: Mid engine, four-wheel drive
- Related: Audi 100; Audi Avus Quattro; Volkswagen Golf

Powertrain
- Engine: 2.8 L (2,771 cc) V6
- Transmission: 5-speed manual transmission

Dimensions
- Wheelbase: 2,540 mm (100 in.)
- Kerb weight: 1,100 kilograms (2,425 lbs.)

The Audi Quattro Spyder was a concept vehicle developed by Audi. It was presented at the Frankfurt Auto Show in October 1991, but further development of the car was later terminated in 1992.

== History ==
The development of the Quattro Spyder began during 1990, and the vehicle was ultimately intended to serve as a replacement for their aging flagship vehicle, the Audi Quattro, whose production was ceasing in the following year. Audi was also seeking a sportier option despite the upcoming Audi S2, and viewed the Quattro Spyder as a good way to move upmarket. It was conceptualized in a similar timeframe to the Audi Avus Quattro, which was revealed just one month after this prototype was presented in Frankfurt.

Following the reveal of the Quattro Spyder, around 3000 pre-orders were ostensibly placed by customers in the following months, however Audi AG ultimately made the decision to cut production short in 1992. This was done for many reasons, among them being price and expected production numbers. The projected sales price was around 100,000 German marks (approx. 55,000$US), but it was quickly realized that this price target could not be met by Audi. The vehicle was also expected to have a lifetime production of 25,000 units, but subcontractors that may have been expected to participate in production, including Porsche or Karmann, did not have the capacity at the time. In addition, the Audi CEO, Ferdinand Piëch, feared that it could serve as a potential competitor to vehicles throughout a declining Porsche's lineup, and did not want to hurt their sales.

== Engine & Design ==
The Quattro Spyder was very different from anything that Audi had produced to that point, and looked very similar to the Audi Avus Quattro that it had been developed alongside of.

The vehicle used the 2.8 liter (2,771 cc) V6 petrol engine found in the C4 Audi 100, and it made 129 kW (172 bhp; 172 PS), and 181 ft·lb (245 N·m) of torque channeled to a 5-speed manual transmission. It was electronically limited to a top speed of 155 mph. (250 km/h)
