= Audi Prologue =

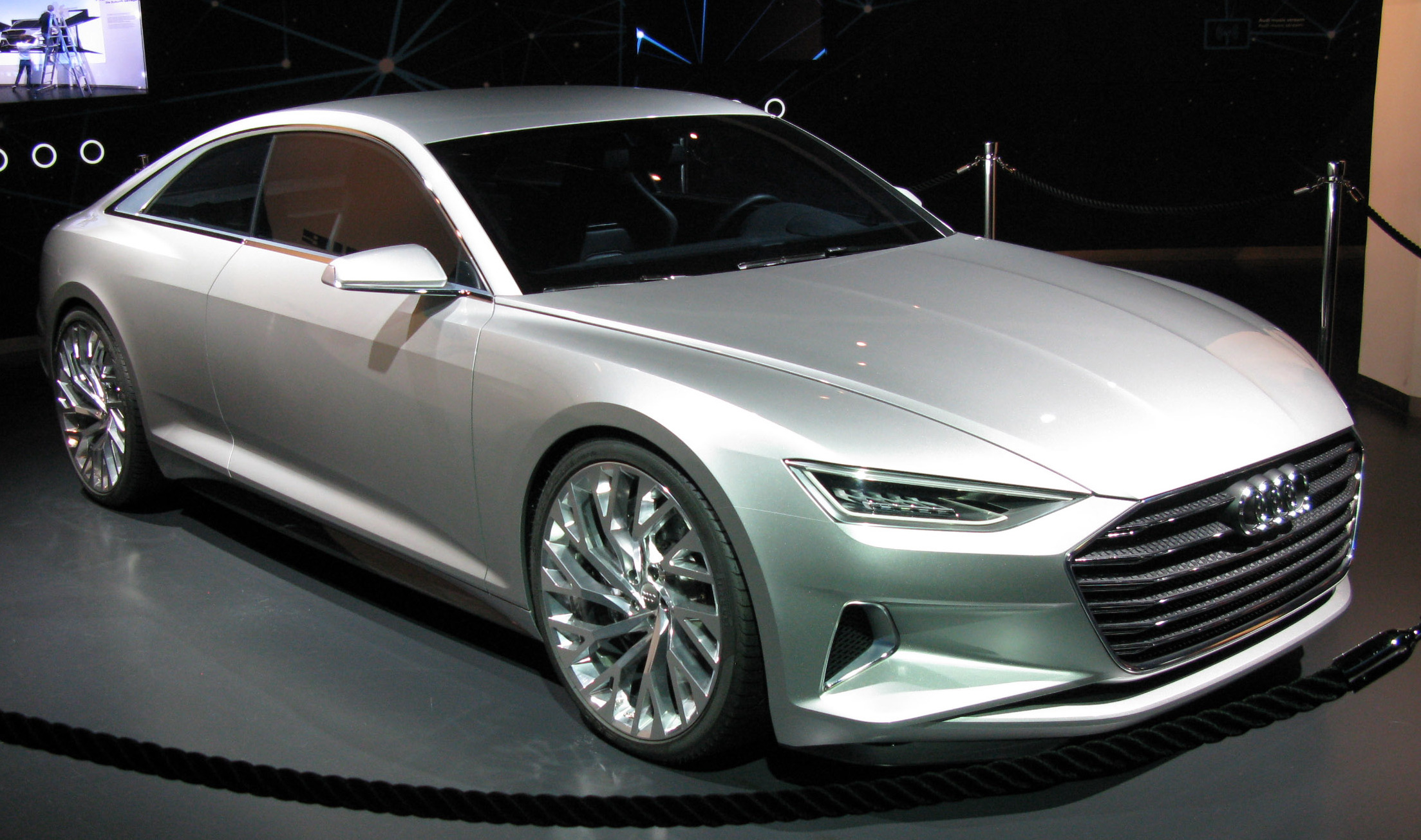
- Audi Prologue Coupé

Overview
- Manufacturer: Audi AG
- Production: 2014

Body and chassis
- Class: Concept car
- Body style: 2-door coupé 5-door Avant; 5-door Avant Allroad
- Layout: Front-engine design, quattro permanent four-wheel drive

Powertrain
- Engine: 4.0 L TFSI V8
- Transmission: 8-speed automatic

Dimensions
- Wheelbase: 2,940 mm (115.7 in)
- Length: 5,110 mm (201.2 in)
- Width: 1,950 mm (76.8 in)
- Height: 1,390 mm (54.7 in)
- Curb weight: 1,980 kg (4,365 lb)

The Audi Prologue is a series of concept cars unveiled by Audi at the 2014 LA Auto Show.

The Prologue features a 4.0 TFSI V8 engine with 445 kW (597 hp) and 700 N⋅m (516 lb⋅ft) of torque (750 N⋅m (553 lb⋅ft) in overboost mode allowing it to accelerate from 0 to 100 km/h (62.1 mph) in 3.7 seconds), an eight‑speed tiptronic, Quattro (four-wheel-drive system) with torque vectoring and self-levelling air suspension with adaptive damping, dynamic all-wheel steering. It is equipped with Matrix laser headlamps, Audi virtual cockpit, 3 OLED tablet-like touchscreens and a next-generation Multi Media Interface.

A notable feature is the central driver assistance control unit (zFAS), a main computer in the vehicle trunk that controls all vehicle functions, dynamics and Advanced driver-assistance systems with real-time computing through a high-speed FlexRay optical fiber data network. It uses a Tegra K1 System on a chip.

Its design and technology previewed the next generation Audi A8, which was unveiled in 2017.

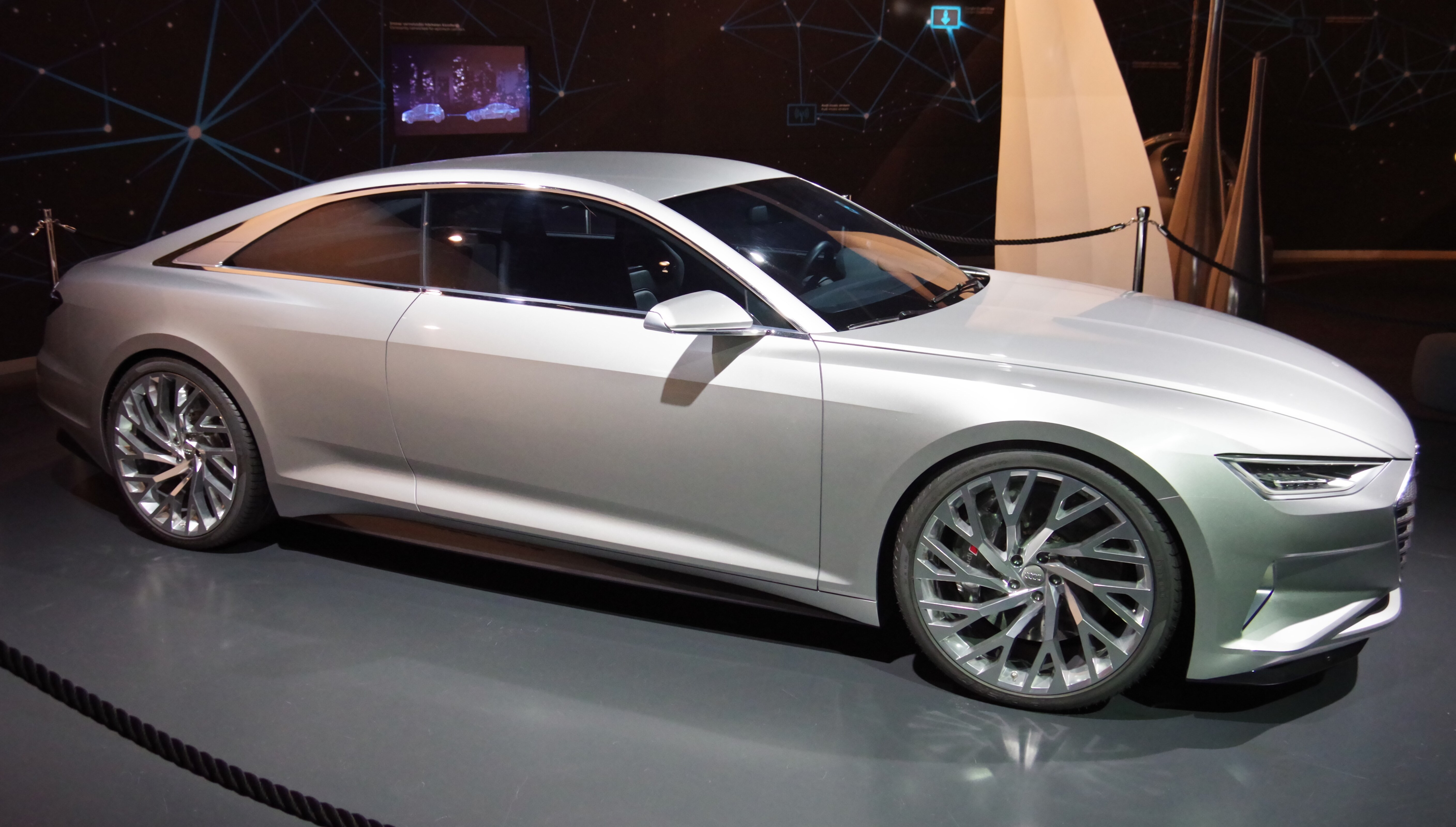
Coupé

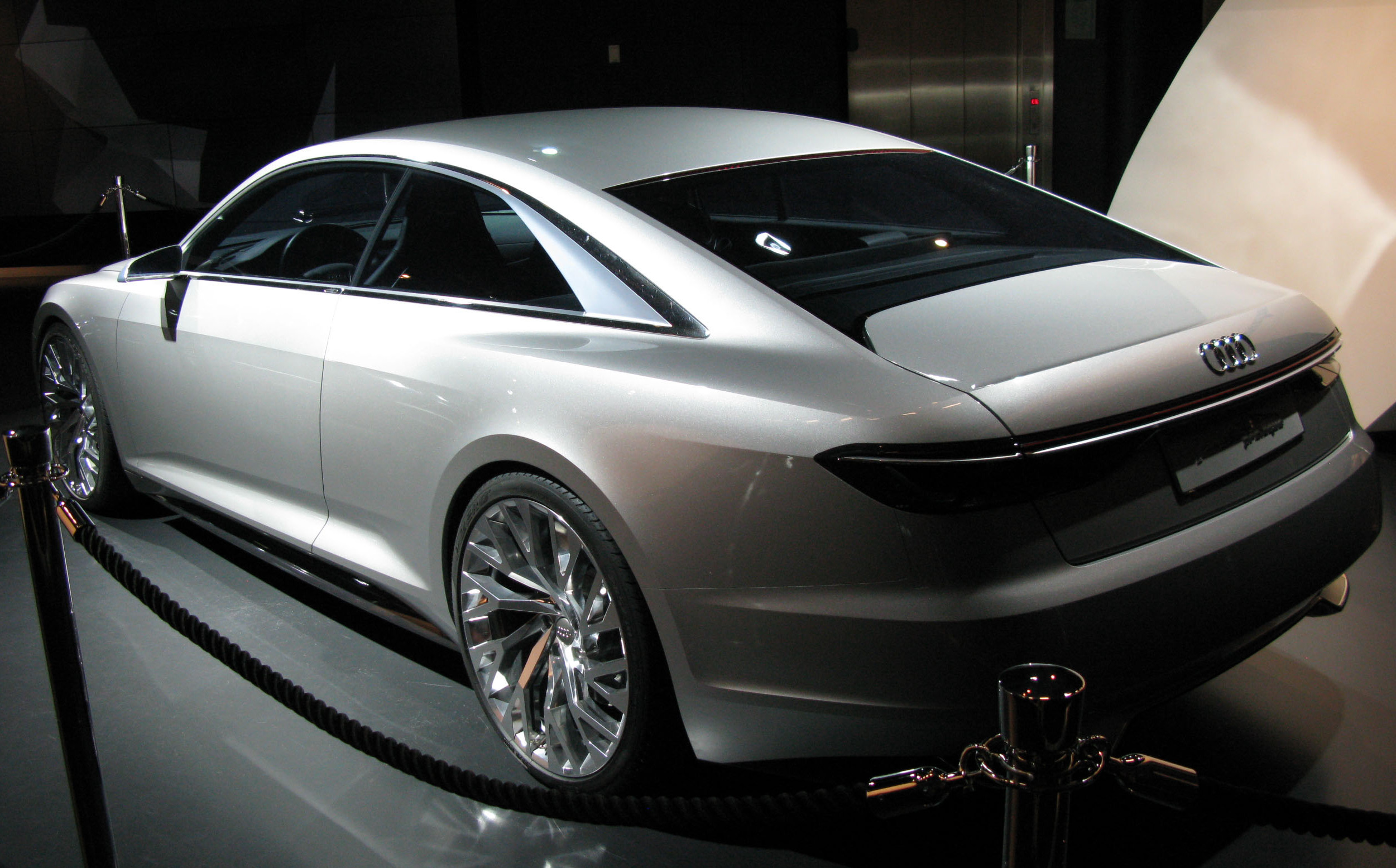
Coupé

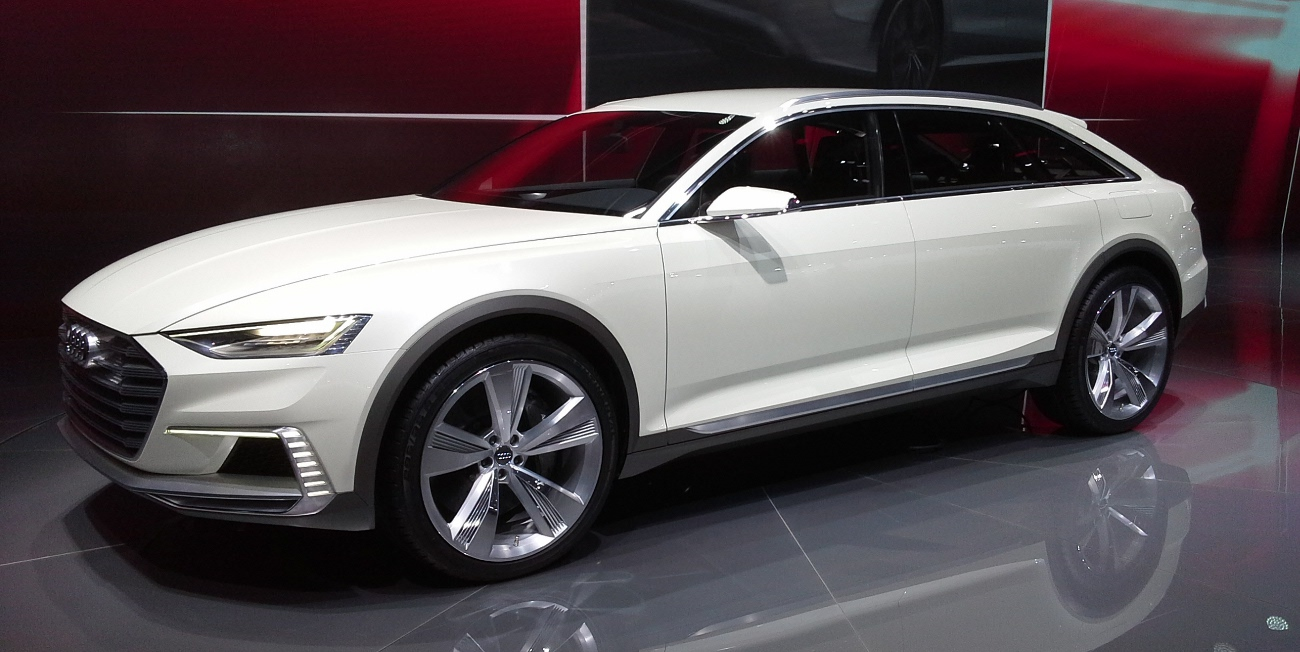
Allroad

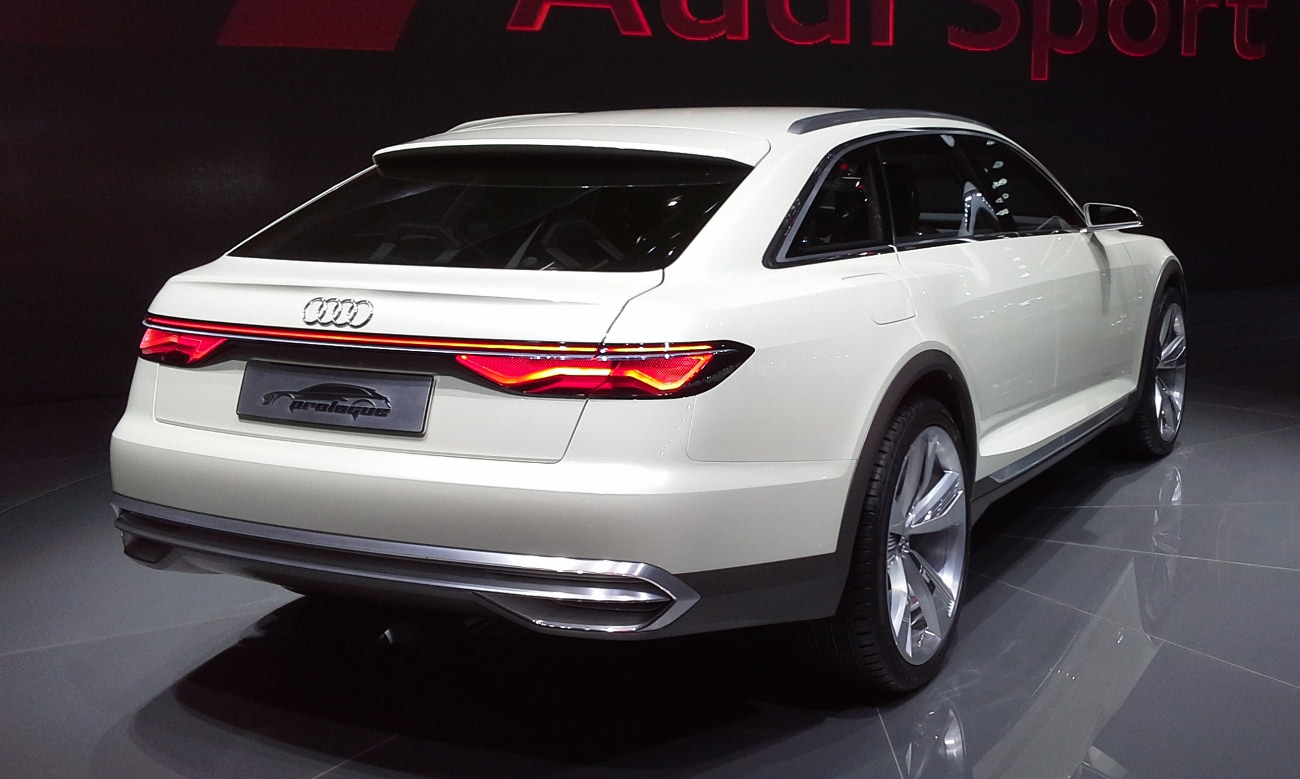
Allroad
