= Audi Concept C =

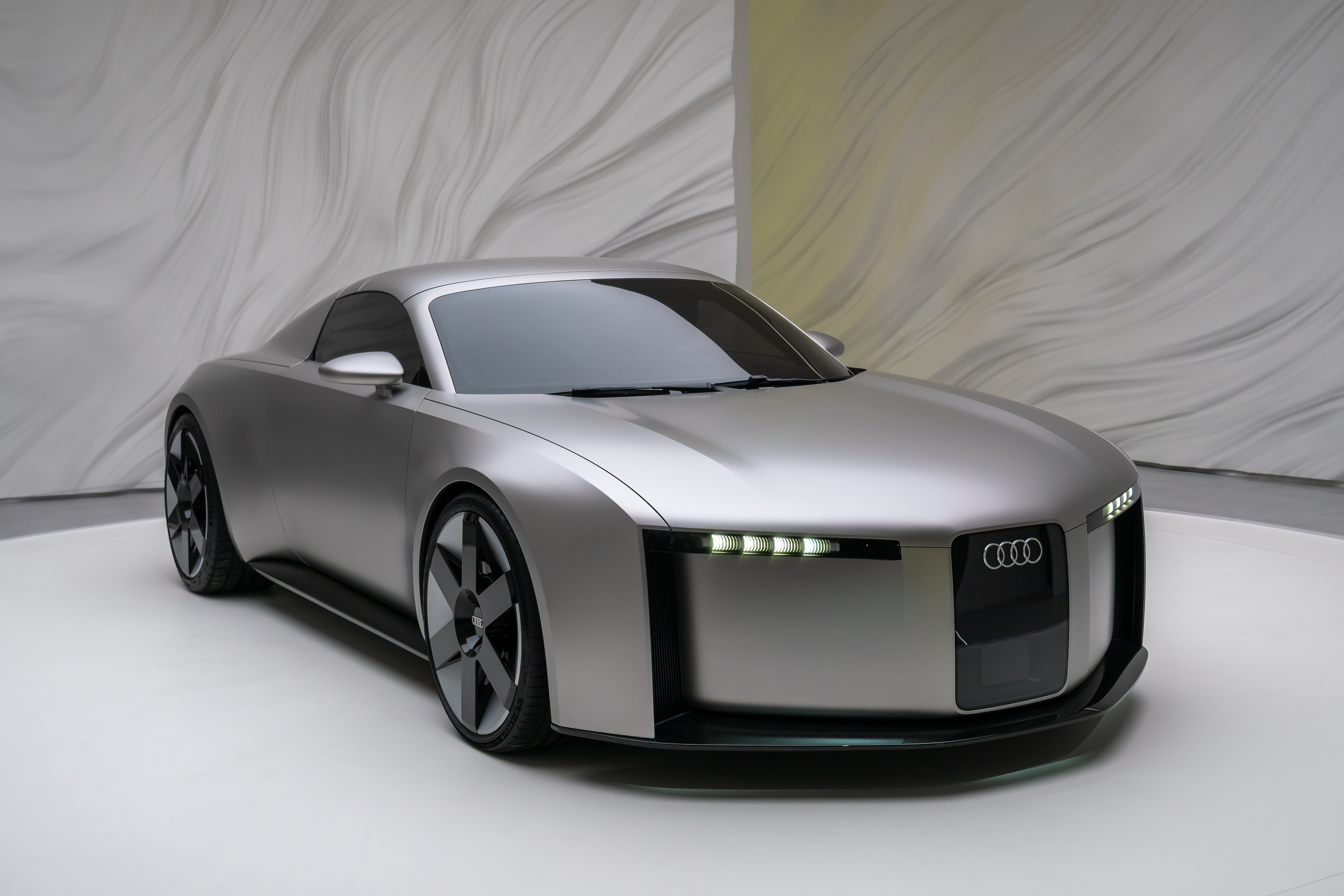

Overview
- Manufacturer: Audi AG
- Production: 2025

Body and chassis
- Class: Concept vehicle
- Body style: 2-door targa top

Powertrain
- Power output: 500 brake horsepower (370 kW); 500 newton-metres (370 lbf⋅ft)
- Transmission: 6-speed manual

The Concept C is a concept car unveiled on the eve of the Munich Motor Show on 4 September 2025 by the German car manufacturer Audi, following its launch to the media in Milan on 2 September.

The Concept C demonstrates a new design language for Audi "radical simplicity", including a new style grille and is reported to be closely linked to the 2-seater electric sports car expected in 2027, a potential new Audi TT.

The roof features a retractable hard top and the body is finished in a titanium colour paintwork and is claimed to be inspired by the 1936 Auto Union Type C. No technical information was announced for the Concept C at the unveiling.
