= Audi Roadjet =

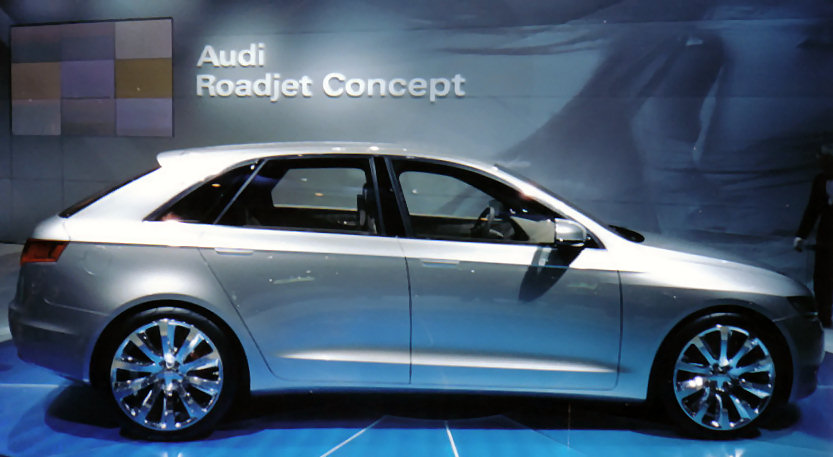
- Audi Roadjet at the 2006; North American International Auto Show

Overview
- Manufacturer: Audi AG
- Production: 2006

Body and chassis
- Class: Compact concept car
- Body style: 5-door hatchback
- Layout: Front engine, quattro on-demand four-wheel drive
- Platform: B7 (PL47)

Powertrain
- Engine: 3.2L V6 engine FSI

The Audi Roadjet is a compact concept car developed by the German manufacturer Audi, and was officially unveiled at the 2006 North American International Auto Show in Detroit, Michigan. It is a study of a sporty and luxurious mid-size hatchback. According to Audi, this study was a technology demonstrator of new electronic systems that would be built into future production models.

== Specifications ==
The Roadjet is the first model to feature a newly developed 3.2-liter V6 Fuel Stratified Injection (FSI) petrol engine with direct fuel injection. The engine develops a maximum output of 300 PS (221 kW; 296 hp) at 7,000 rpm and 363 Nm (244 lb·ft) of torque at 4,500 rpm, which is reached through the fixed intake manifold and a valve control system called Audi Valvelift System. The Roadjet is also equipped with a new 7-speed version of Direct-Shift Gearbox, and reportedly should be able to accelerate from 0 to 100 km/h (62 mph) in 6.4 seconds, while its top speed is electronically limited at 250 km/h (155 mph). The vehicle also features Audi's trademark four-wheel drive system - quattro.

This concept previewed the styling of the Audi A3's 2008 facelift.

The interior of the Roadjet features four individual bucket seats, a 10-inch screen in front that is part of Audi's Multi Media Interface system, two 7-inch screens for the rear seats, and a Bang & Olufsen stereo system. The space between the two rear seats can be configured to fit a storage box with an armrest, a rear facing baby carrier, or an espresso machine. It also reportedly has a system designed to communicate with nearby vehicles and roadside infrastructure via wireless LAN.
