= Audi e-tron Vision Gran Turismo =

Concept sports car made by Audi

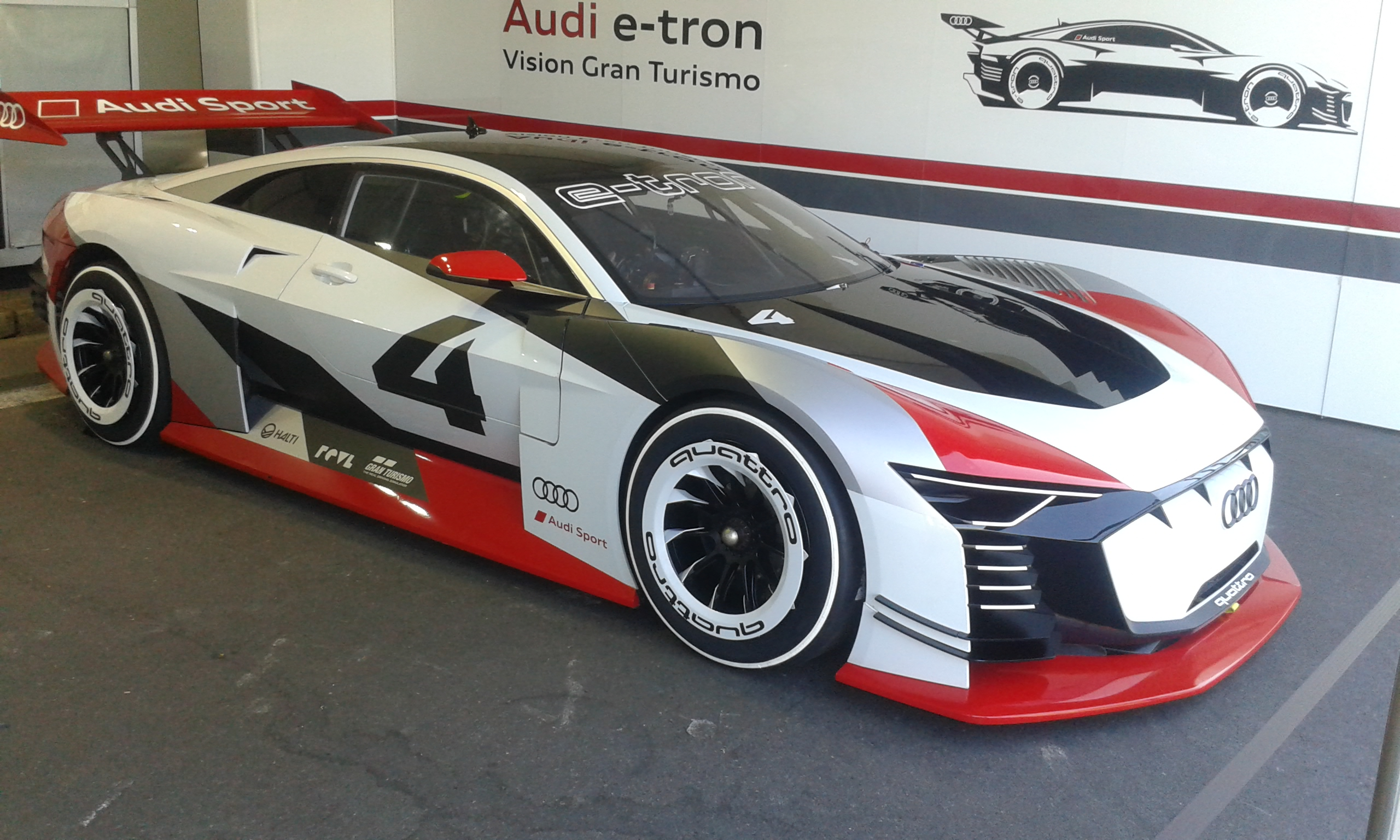

Overview
- Manufacturer: Audi Sport GmbH
- Model years: 2018
- Designer: Marc Lichte (lead); Andreas Krüger (exterior)

Body and chassis
- Class: Concept car Race car
- Body style: 2-door coupé
- Related: Audi 90 quattro IMSA GTO

Powertrain
- Electric motor: 3 electric motors One front, two rear 268 hp, 246 lb-ft per unit
- Power output: 804 hp (600 kW; 815 PS); 738 lb⋅ft (1,001 N⋅m)
- Transmission: Single-speed fixed gear

Dimensions
- Curb weight: 1,450 kg (3,197 lb)

The Audi e-tron Vision Gran Turismo is a two-seater concept car developed by Audi Sport GmbH and was manufactured in Germany. In April 2018, the car was unveiled at the Audi Competence Center Motorsport at Neuburg an der Donau, Bavaria, Germany, four days after two teaser trailers were released on YouTube. The car was fully constructed in a span of 11 months.

The car was deemed the first official fully functioning concept car that can drive on the roads. This is also the first fully functioning concept car which matches the virtual and "on-paper" specifications with the real specifications.

== Specifications ==
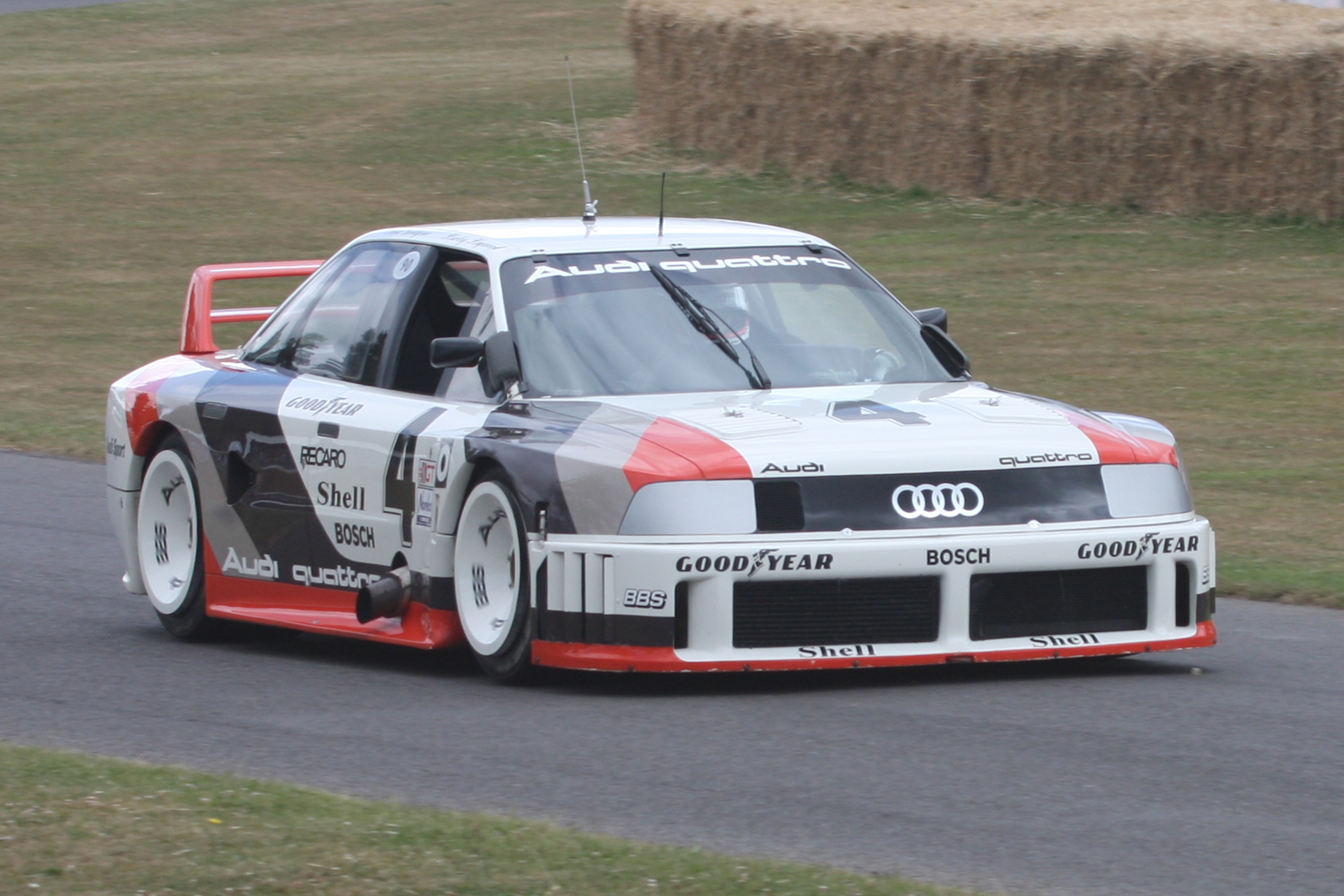
The Audi 90 quattro IMSA GTO served as inspiration for the car's development.

The Audi e-tron Vision Gran Turismo has three electric motors, two at the rear axle, one at the front axle. Each motor delivers 268 hp (200 kW; 272 PS) and 246 lb⋅ft (334 N⋅m), for a total of 804 hp (600 kW; 815 PS) and 738 lb⋅ft (1,001 N⋅m). The curb weight of the vehicle stands at 1,450 kg (3,197 lb) with a 50:50 weight distribution, and also giving the car a power-to-weight ratio of 554 hp per ton. The car runs on a permanent all-wheel drive drivetrain. The car does contain some elements used for future "e-tron" production cars, according to Audi. The e-tron Vision Gran Turismo also uses Audi's DTM ceramic brakes and steering wheel, 305-width racing tyres, and other parts from the Audi R8 LMS, their Group GT3 race car.

According to Audi and Polyphony Digital, the car also performs a 0–60 mph (0–97 km/h) run of 2.5 seconds.

Marc Lichte led the entire design process, with Andreas Krüger completing the exterior. The vehicle's design and livery is heavily inspired by the Audi 90 quattro IMSA GTO.

== Media ==
The Audi e-tron Vision Gran Turismo is available for virtual driving in the Polyphony Digital racing games, Gran Turismo Sport and Gran Turismo 7. Two versions exist in the game, with one of them (which does not exist in the real world) scrapping the "e-tron" moniker and opting for a 3.4-liter turbocharged V6 engine with hybrid assistance from a single electric motor.

The Audi e-tron Vision Gran Turismo featured in the game has a significantly more conceptualized and fictitious interior compared to its real world counterpart's more conventional race car design.

== Motorsport ==
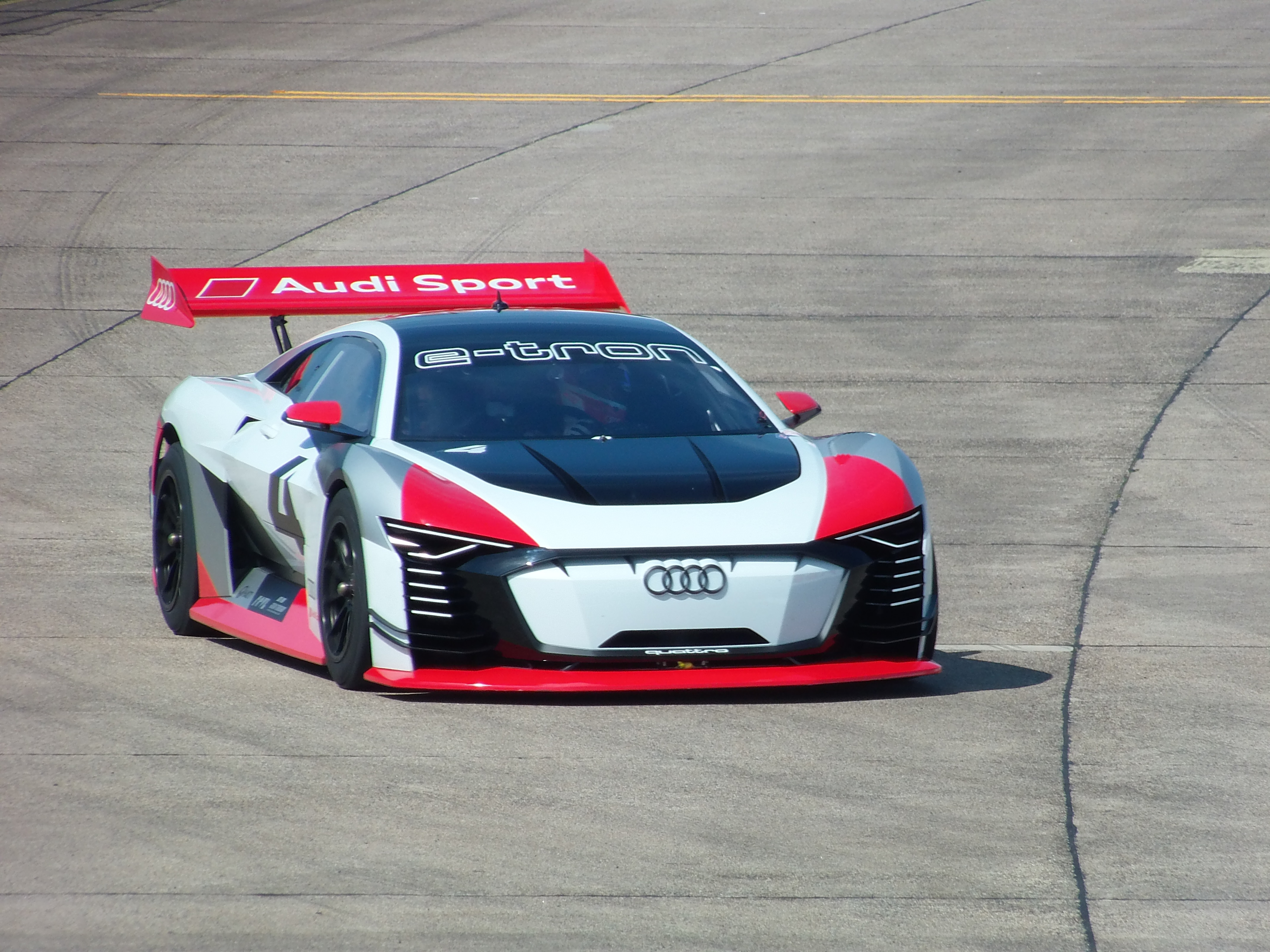
Audi e-tron Vision Gran Turismo as a race taxi at the 2018 Berlin ePrix.

The e-tron Vision Gran Turismo was used as a race taxi for the ABB FIA Formula E Championship in the 2017–18 season. In the e-tron, customers of Audi were able to experience Formula E's city circuits as passengers with either racing drivers Rahel Frey or Rinaldo "Dindo" Capello driving the concept car. Its first was in Rome, Italy at the Circuto Cittadino dell'EUR, the street circuit for the Rome ePrix.

== See also ==
- Audi e-tron
- Vision Gran Turismo
- Gran Turismo Sport
