= Audi Avus quattro =

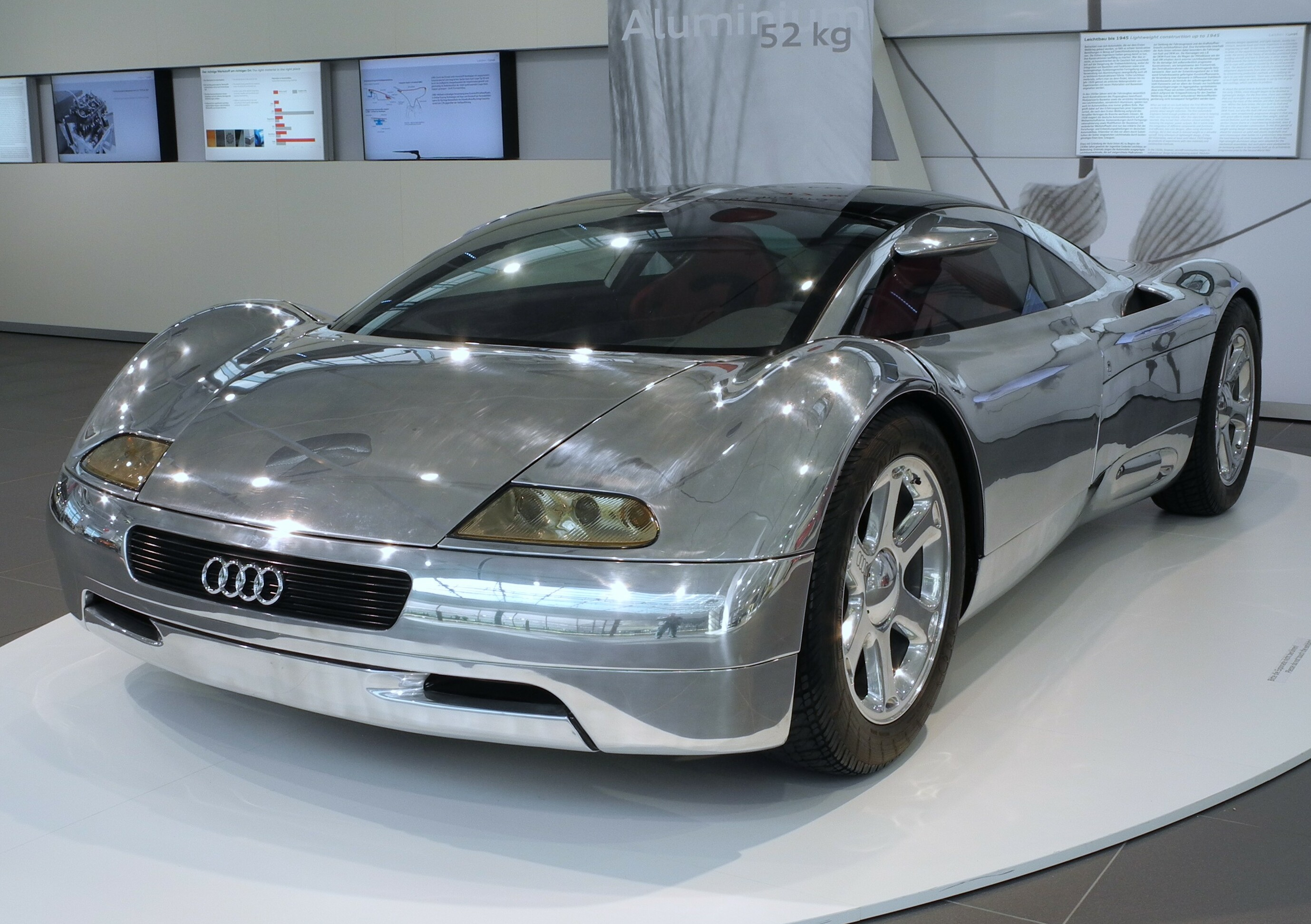

Overview
- Manufacturer: Audi AG
- Also called: Audi Avus
- Production: 1991 (Concept car)
- Designer: J Mays, Martin Smith

Body and chassis
- Class: Concept car
- Body style: 2-door coupé
- Layout: Mid engine, quattro permanent four-wheel drive

Powertrain
- Engine: 6.0 L Audi W12 (wooden mock up)
- Transmission: 6-speed manual

Dimensions
- Length: 4,470 mm (176.0 in)
- Width: 2,006 mm (79.0 in)
- Curb weight: 1,250 kg (2,755 lbs)

Chronology
- Predecessor: Audi 100S Coupe Speciale
- Successor: Audi Rosemeyer

The Audi Avus quattro was a concept sports car made by the German car manufacturer Audi. It was first introduced at the 1991 Tokyo Motor Show. The Avus quattro had an aluminium space frame, which helped reduce weight. This second showing of the new aluminium architecture (after the quattro Spyder a month before) led to the mass-produced aluminium A8 in 1994.

== Design ==
The bodywork on the Avus was designed by J Mays and inspired by Auto Union race cars of the 1930s, which featured unpainted aluminum bodies. The panels are made from polished 1.5 mm thick aluminum that was hand-beaten.

== Specifications ==
The Avus quattro's engine was supposed to be a 6.0 L 60-valve W12 engine producing 509 PS (374 kW; 502 hp). The car shown at the Tokyo Motor Show, however, was fitted with a precision painted dummy, crafted from wood and plastic. Reason being, that at the time, its intended powertrain was still in development; Audi-made W12 engines were not available to buyers until 2001, on the 2001 Audi A8 6.0 W12 quattro. The Avus also features three lockable differentials, rear-wheel steering and a NACA-style duct mounted on the roof.

The Avus quattro is now on display at Audi's headquarters in Ingolstadt, Germany.

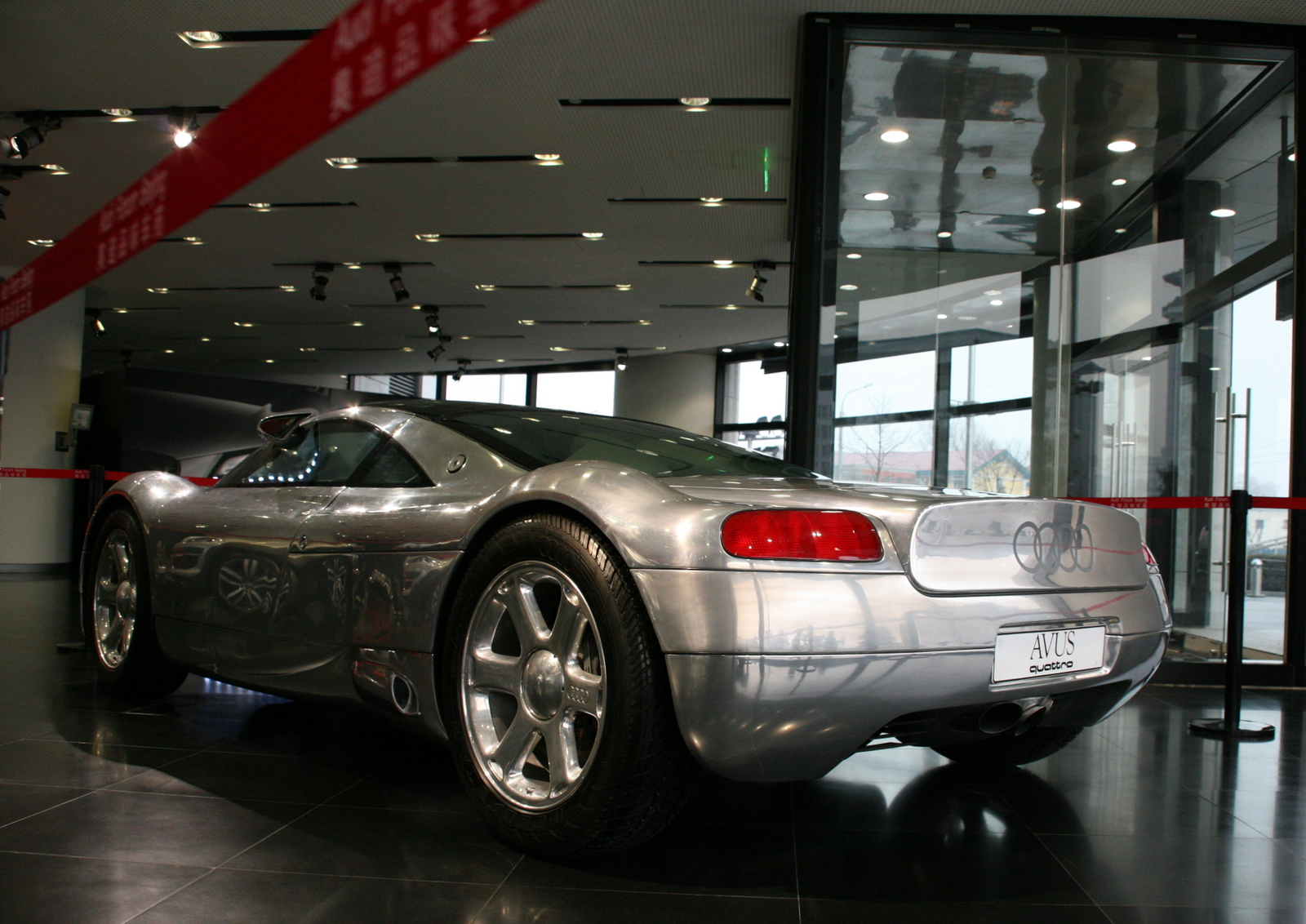
Back view

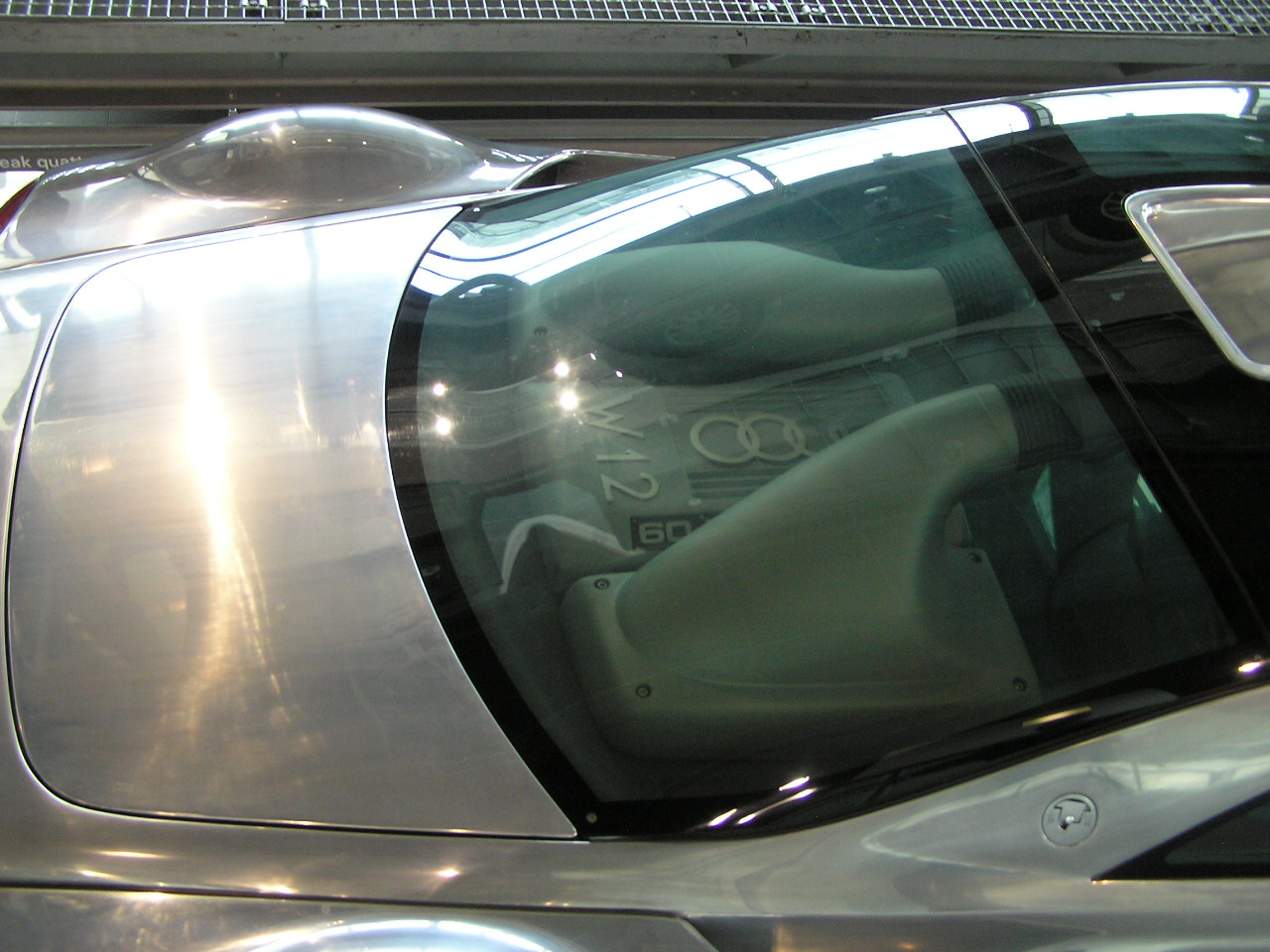
W12 Engine

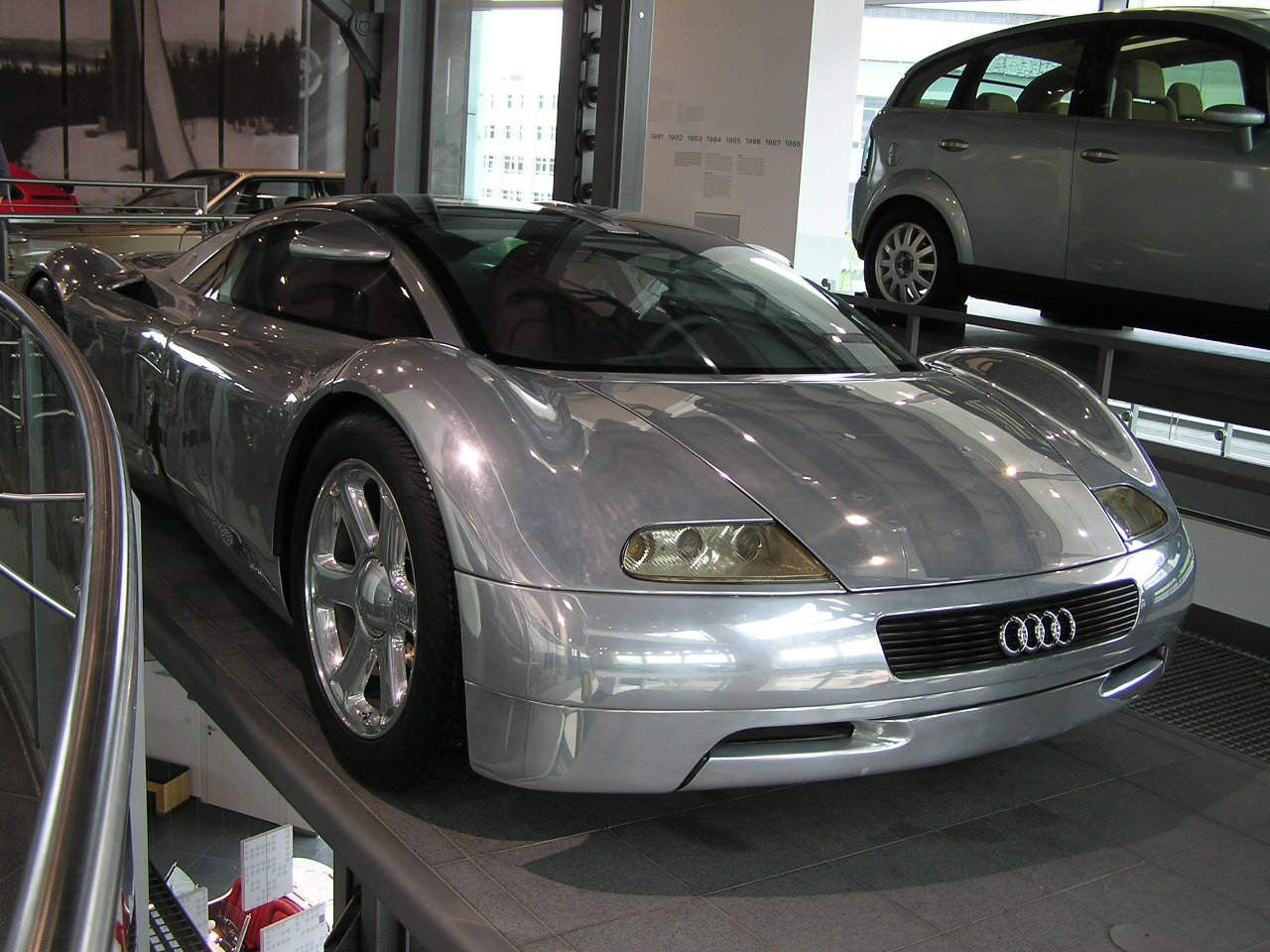
Front view
