= Audi allroad quattro =

The Audi allroad quattro began in 1999 as a semi-offroad version of the Audi A6 Avant (station wagon). Since 2009, Audi has also offered the "Audi A4 allroad quattro", based on the mainstream Audi A4 Avant (wagon). Audi accordingly retitled subsequent generations of the larger allroad, as released in 2006, 2012 and 2019. as "Audi A6 allroad quattro".

The main differences between the allroad and the base model are a wider track (accommodated by plastic wheel arch extensions), higher ground clearance, and adjustable air suspension.

Although the owners manual in the US states the vehicle may take a class I or class II trailer hitch, Audi no longer sells these in North America and aftermarket versions lower the ground clearance by two inches and involves cutting into the bumper, which the Audi hitch sold in Europe does not.

== A4 allroad quattro (2009–2024) ==
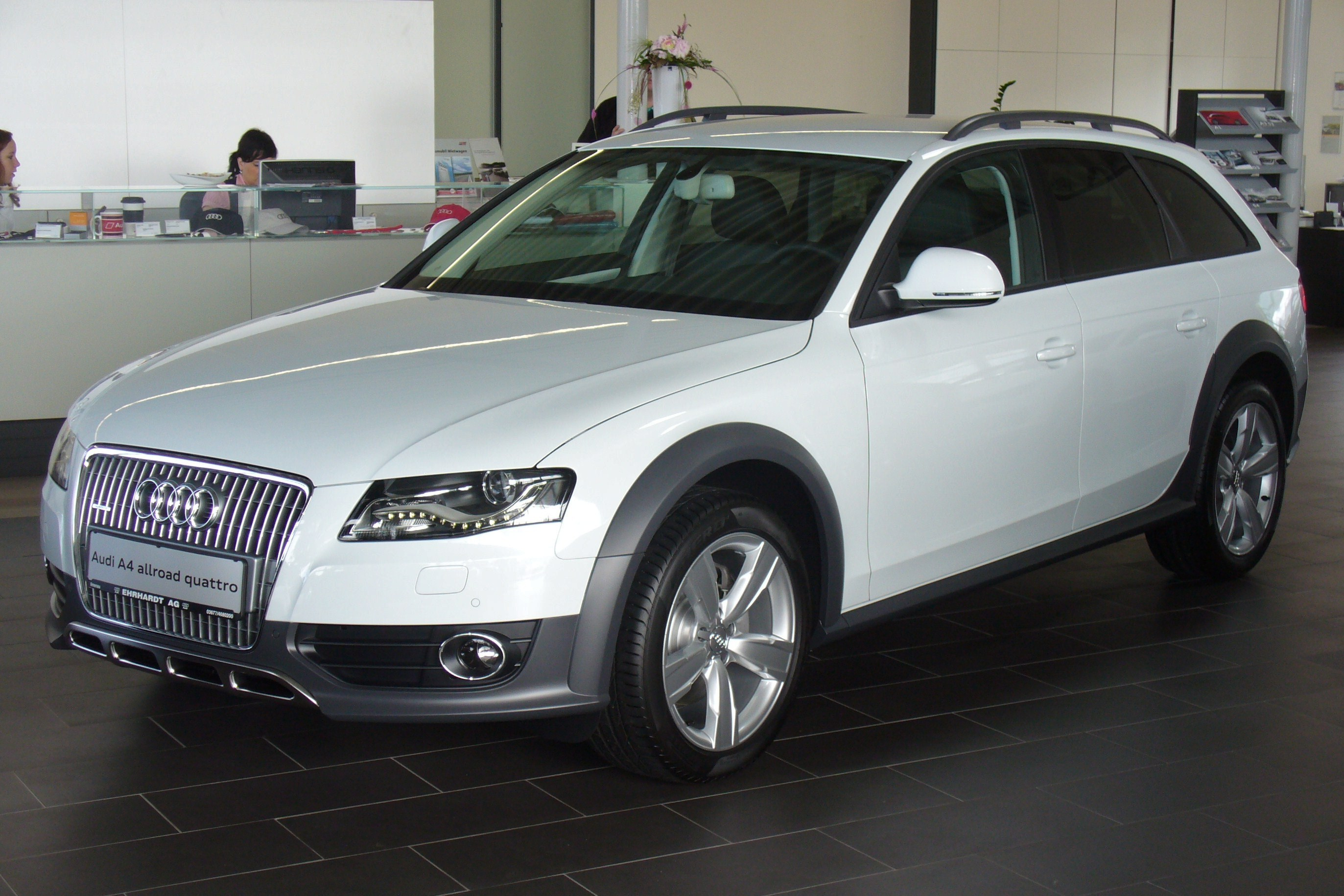
2009–2015 (B8)

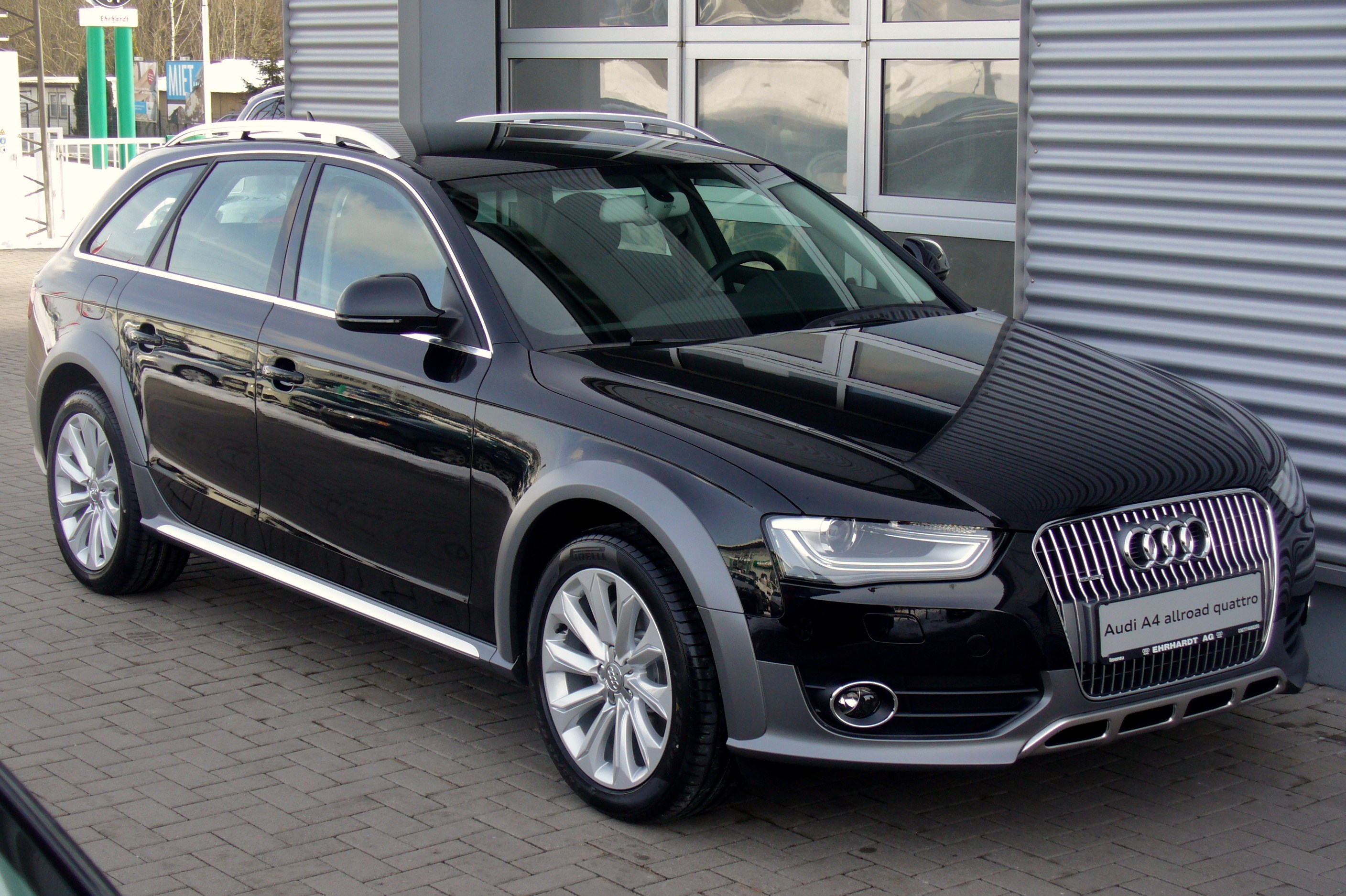
2011–2015 (B8 Facelift)

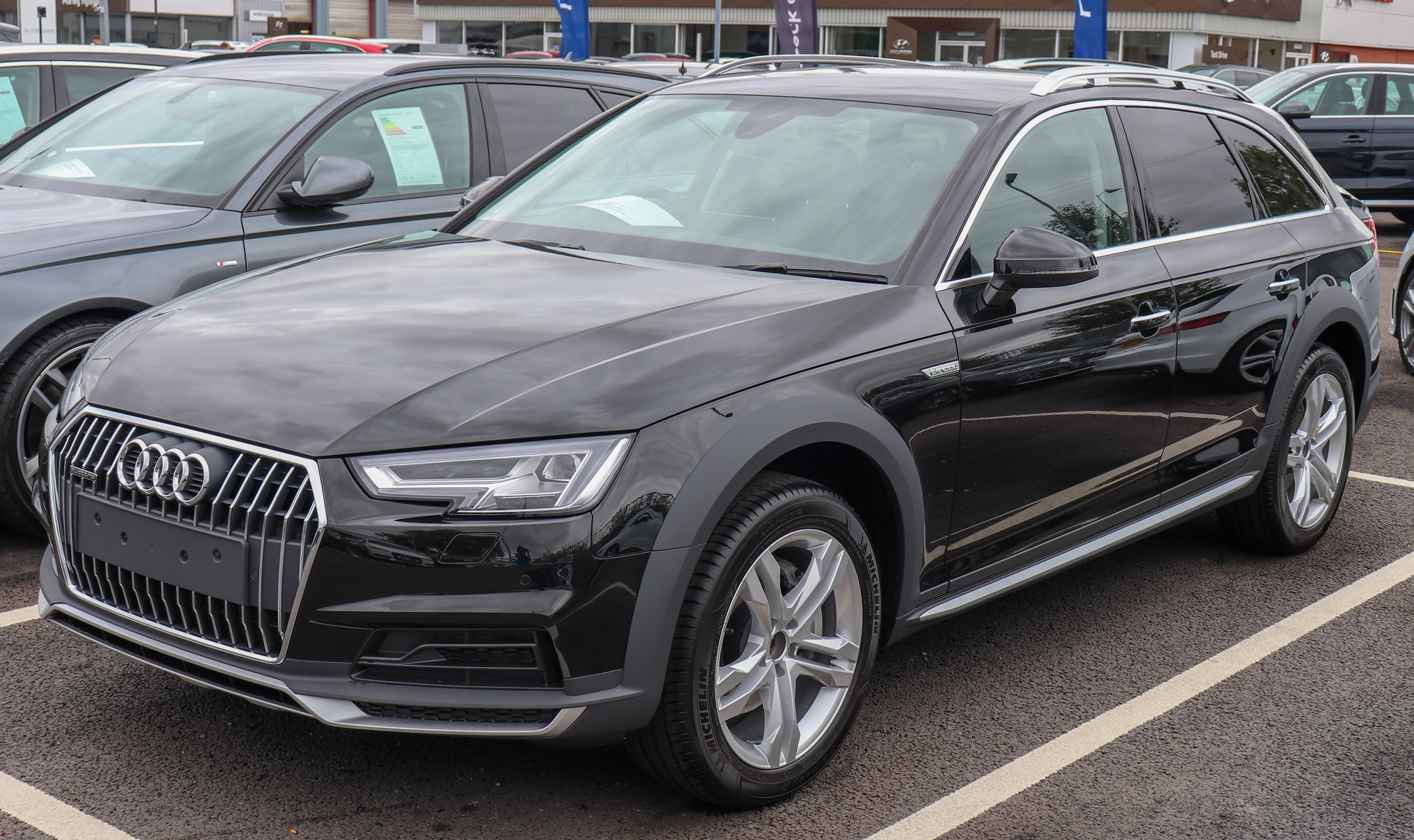
2016–2024 (B9)

== A6 allroad quattro (1999–present) ==
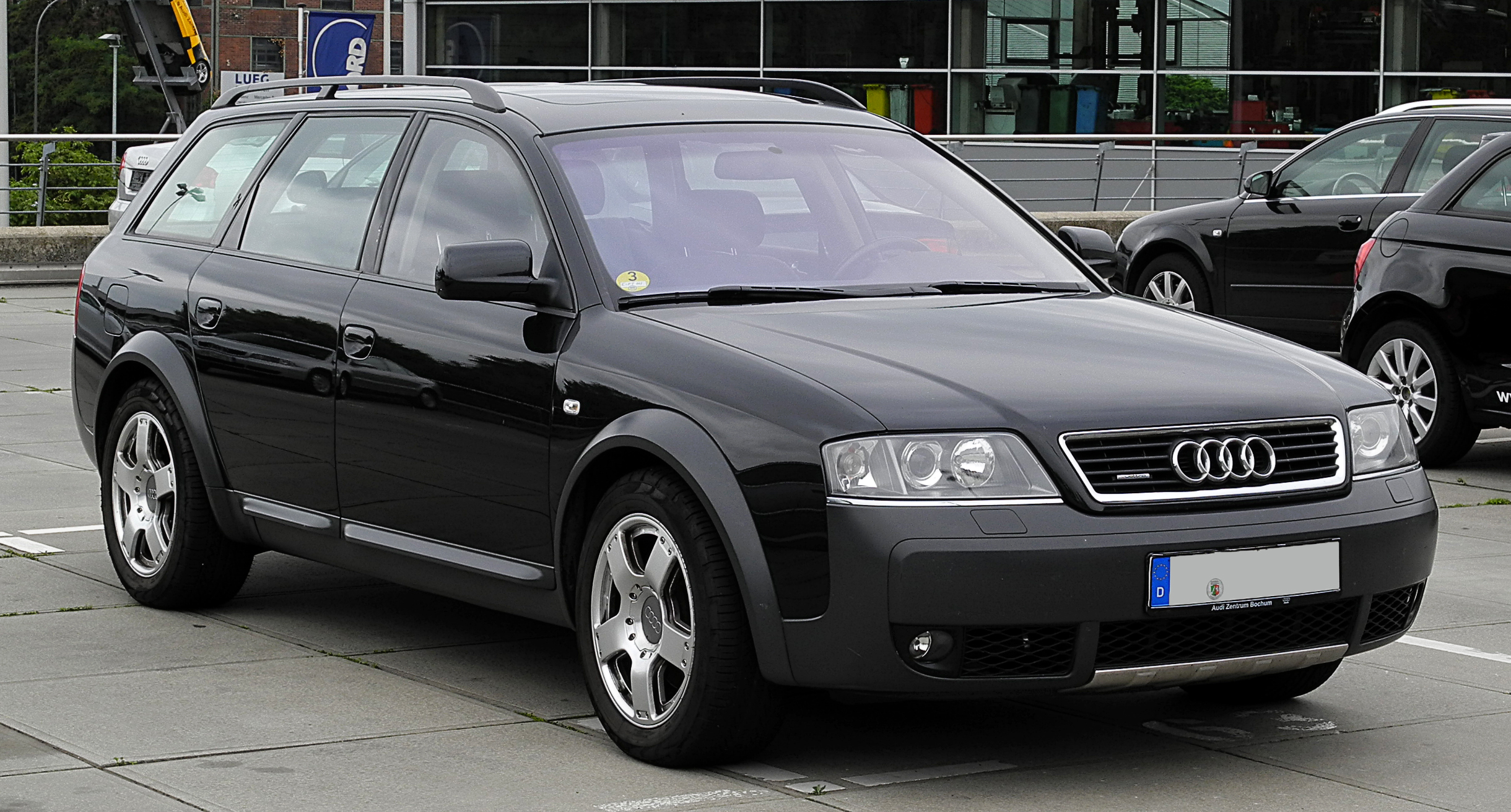
1999–2005 (C5)

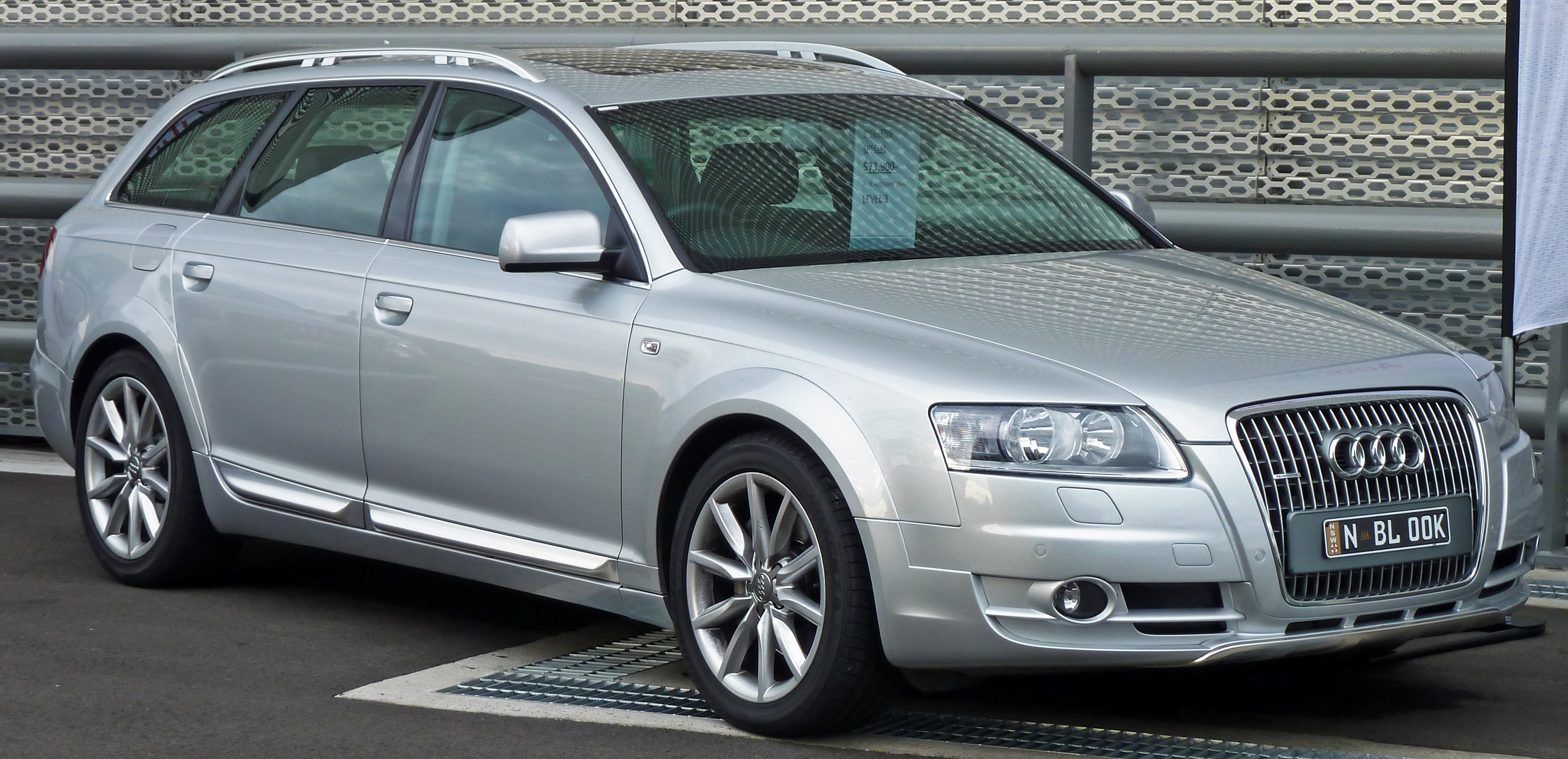
2006–2011 (C6)

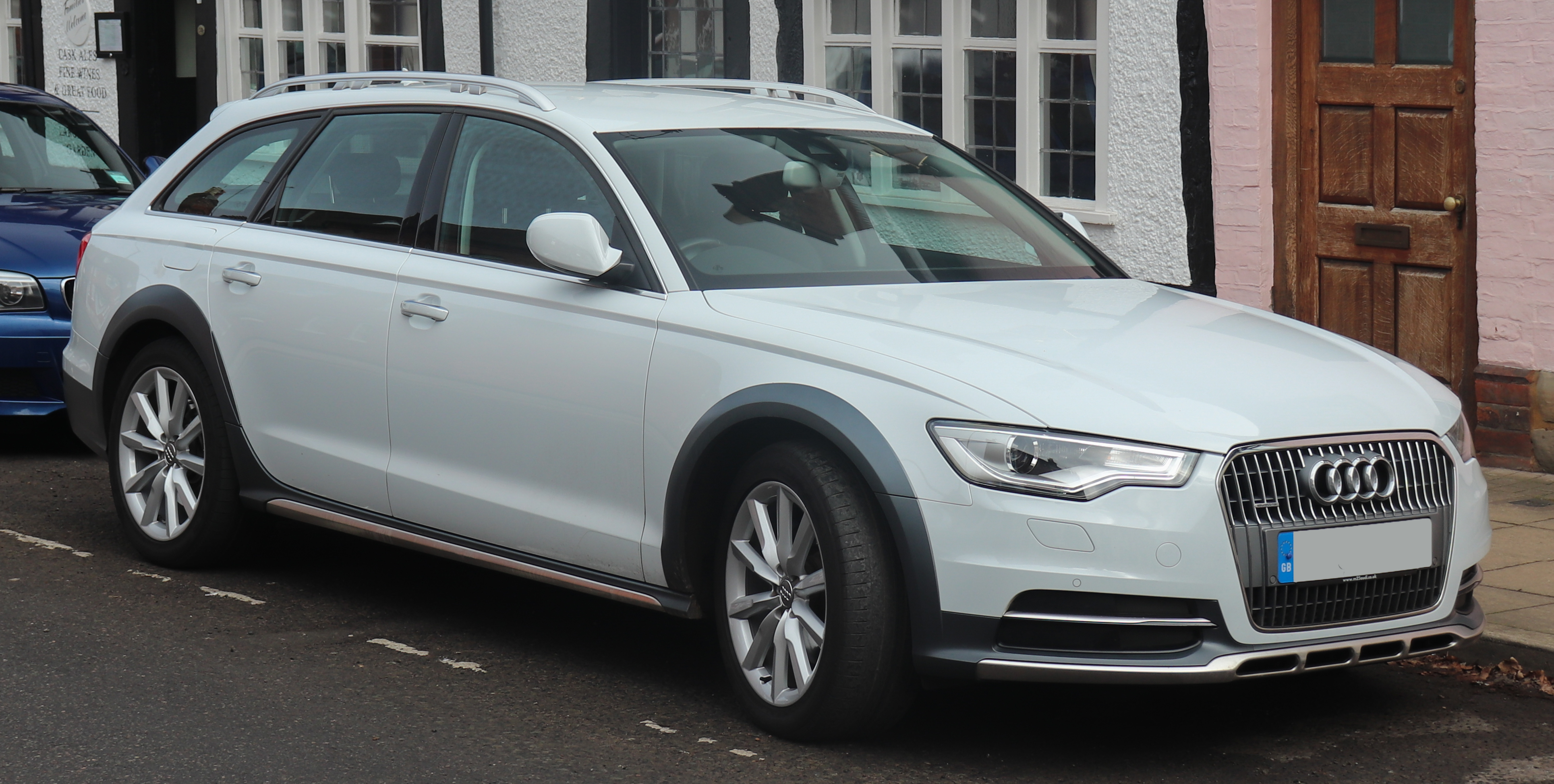
2012–2018 (C7)

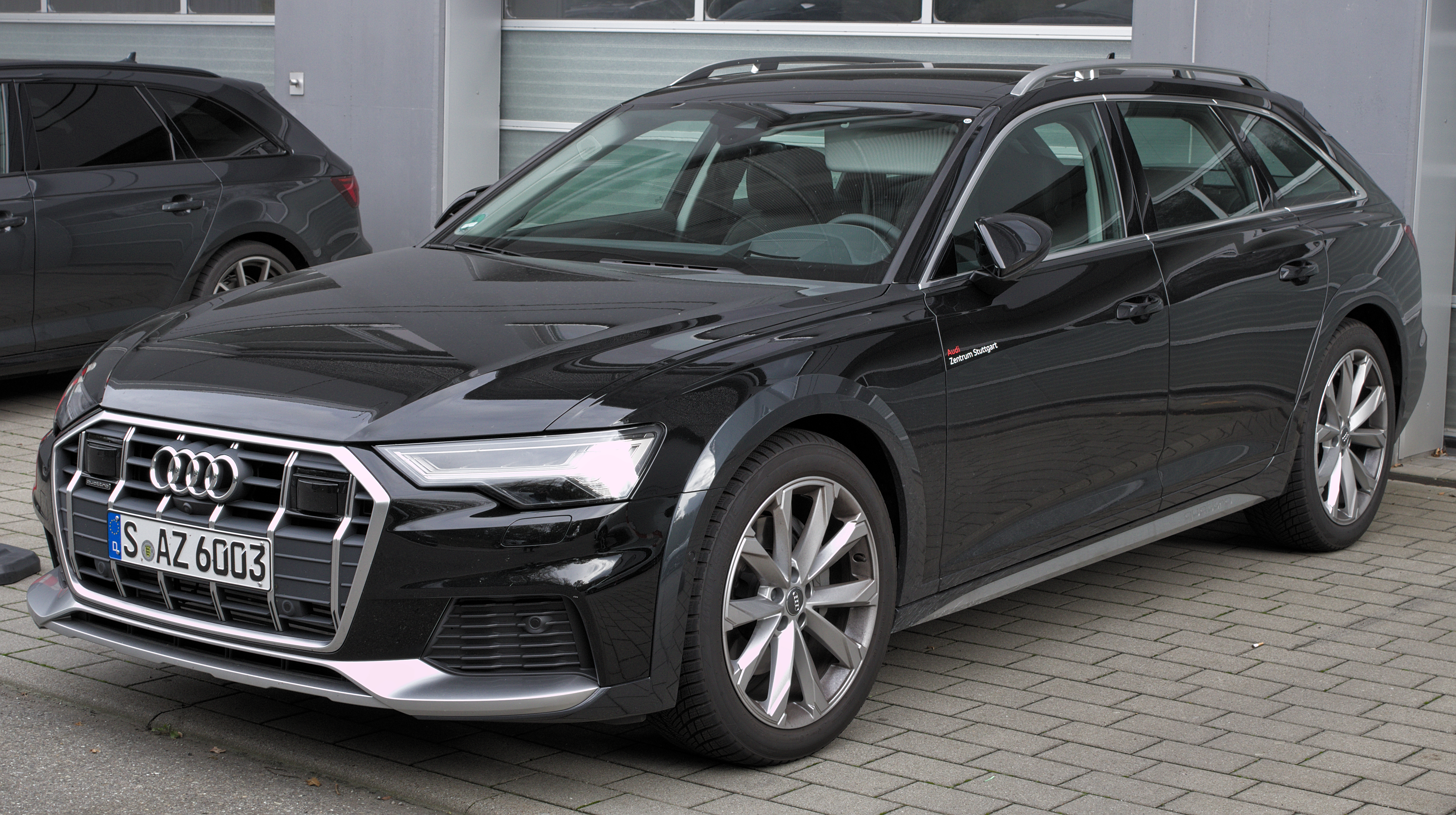
2019–2025 (C8)

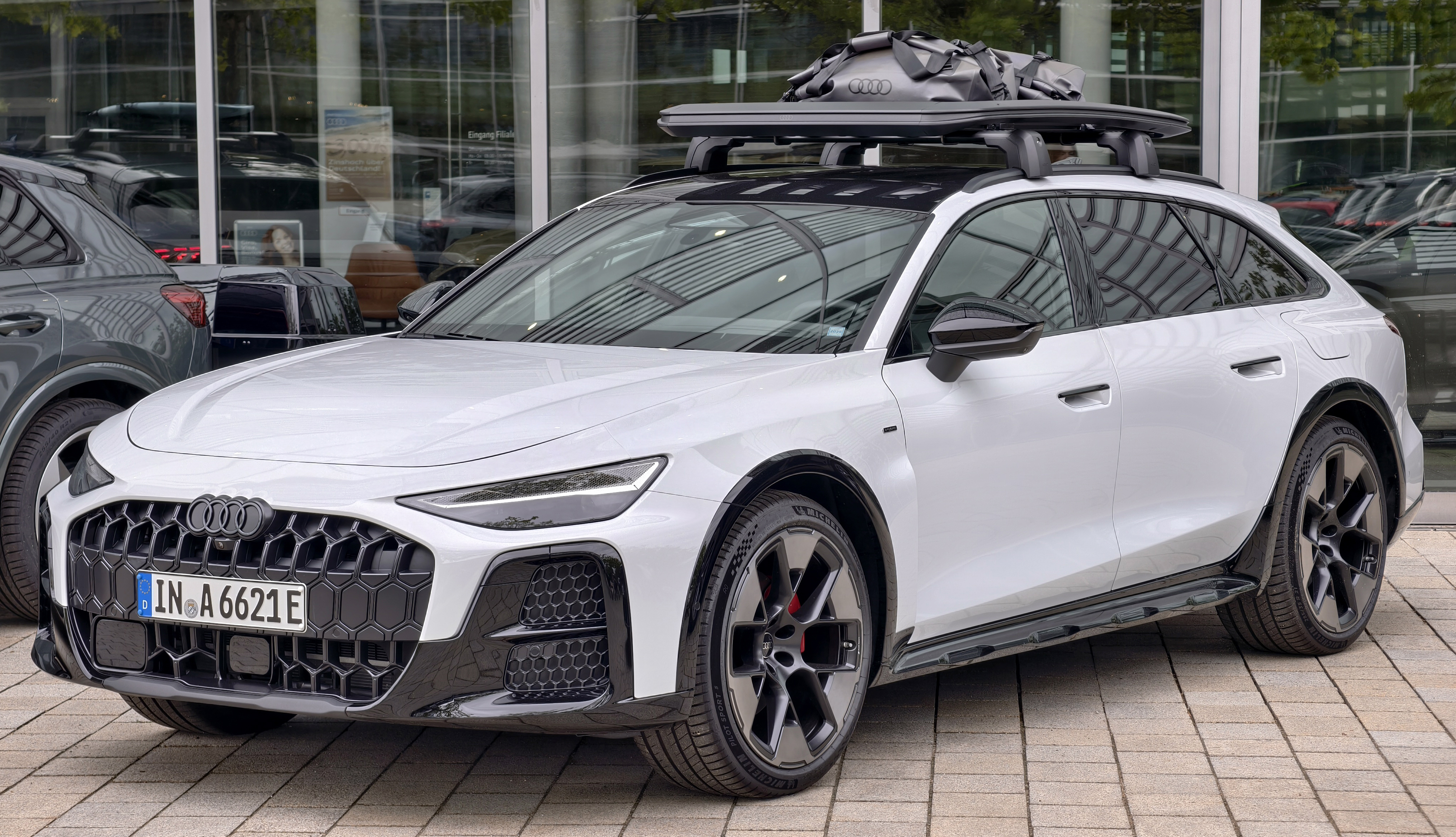
2026–present (C9)
