= Zenvo Aurora =

Grand touring sports car manufactured by Danish automobile manufacturer Zenvo

Overview
- Manufacturer: Zenvo Automotive A/S
- Production: 2026 (to commence)
- Assembly: Præstø in Zealand, Denmark
- Designer: Christian Brandt

Body and chassis
- Class: Sports car (S)
- Body style: 2-door coupé
- Layout: Rear mid-engine, rear-wheel-drive (Aurora Agil); Mid-engine, four-wheel-drive (Aurora Tur)
- Doors: Butterfly doors

Powertrain
- Engine: 6.6 L Mjølner quad-turbocharged V12
- Electric motor: 3x permanent magnet motors (Tur) 1x permanent magnet motors (Agil)
- Transmission: 7-speed Hybridised paddle shift gearbox

Chronology
- Predecessor: Zenvo TS1 GT

The Zenvo Aurora is an upcoming limited production sports car manufactured by Danish automobile manufacturer Zenvo Automotive. It was announced on 14 March 2023 and it was unveiled in August. It is the successor to the V8-powered TS1 GT, and the company's first model to feature a hybrid powertrain and a V12 engine. The Aurora will be available in two variants. The Aurora Tur is a more road-focused, grand touring all-wheel drive model that features an electric motor pair on the front axle. This variant of the Aurora is capable of reaching 248 mph (400 km/h) and has a claimed top speed of 280 mph (450 km/h). The Aurora Agil is a more track-focused rear-wheel drive variant with a claimed top speed of 227 mph (365km/h). 50 units of each variant will be built with a total of 100 units planned for 2026.

For the faster accelerating Tur variant, acceleration from 0 to 62 mph (100 km/h) can be done in a claimed 2.3 seconds. In 9 seconds the Aurora can accelerate from 0 to 186 mph (300 km/h) and 0 to 248 mph (400 km/h) takes a claimed 17 seconds.

== History ==
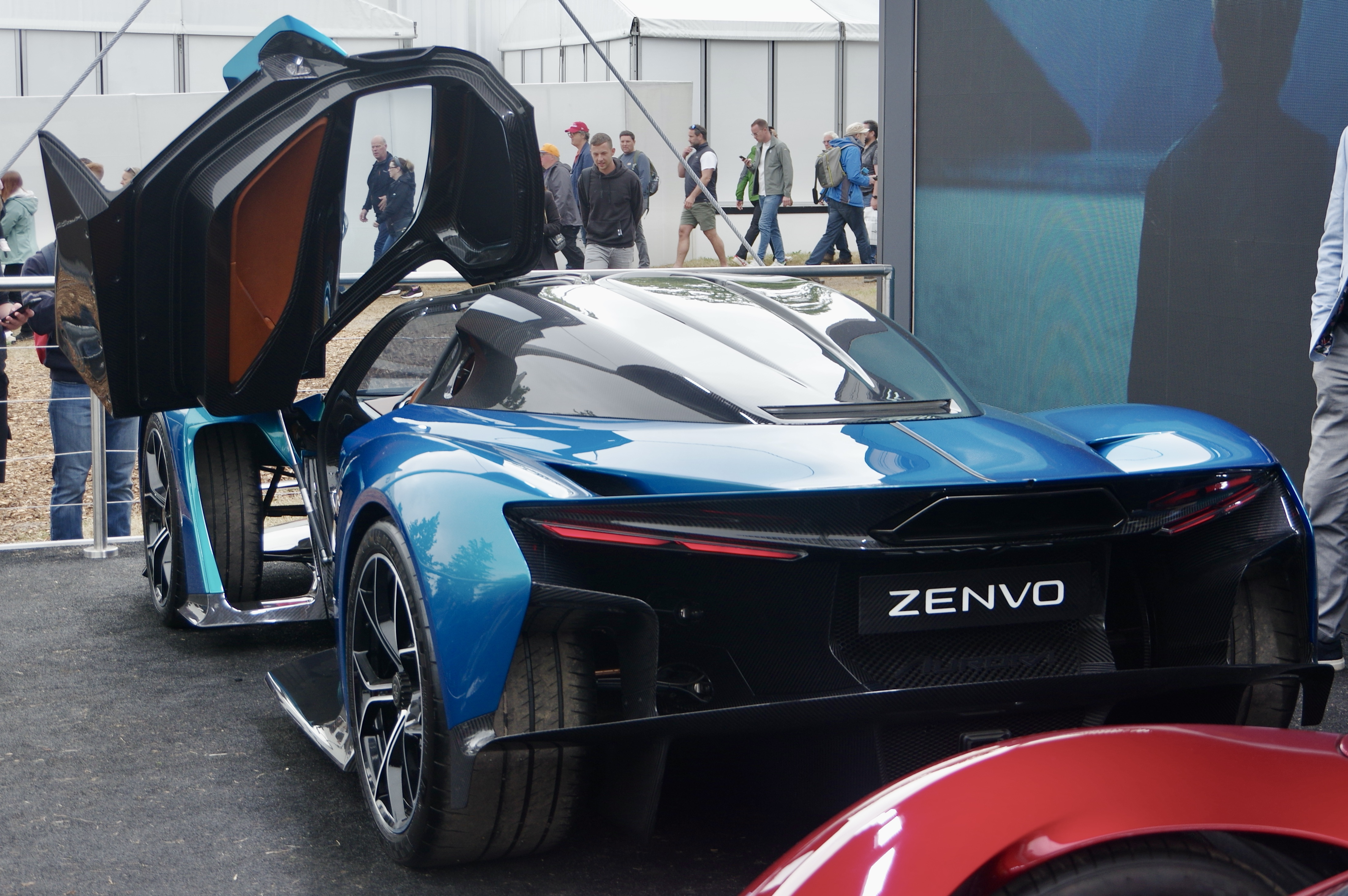
Zenvo Aurora Tur rear

Zenvo Aurora Agil

Zenvo Aurora Agil rear

On 29 August 2022, Zenvo announced that a hybrid hypercar is in development. On 14 March 2023, they announced that it would launch the Aurora. On 11 July, Zenvo announced that the Aurora would be unveiled on 18 August. In July 2025, the car's production form made its dynamic debut at the Goodwood Festival of Speed, completing the iconic hill climb for the first time. The production of the car is planned to be limited at 100 units.

== Specifications ==
=== Powertrain ===
The Aurora is powered by a 6.6-litre Mjølner quad-turbocharged V12 engine developed by Mahle Powertrain, making 1250 bhp alone from the engine, plus 3 electric motors making 600 bhp. The total power output is 1850 bhp and 1700 NM of torque. The engine revs up to 9,800 rpm. The Aurora Agil only features 1 of the 200 bhp electric motors, so it has a total power output of 1,450 bhp. The Zenvo Aurora is equipped with the most powerful V12 engine ever fitted to a road car. It has a 7-speed hybridized automatic gearbox with paddle shifters. The gearbox features an electric motor-generator that is used to make the transitions between gears feel smoother, as well as act as a starter motor and reverse gear.

The Mjølner V12 engine features a modern engine injection technology called "jet ignition," which was developed in Northampton, United Kingdom by the powertrain division of the German automotive solutions specialist, Mahle GmbH. This ignition system does not utilize traditional spark plugs to set off the combustion event. Instead, this engine features a pre-chamber ignition system per cylinder in addition to a traditional fuel injector into each main combustion chamber. The process works by a fuel injector spraying atomized fuel into the pre-chamber, where it is ignited by a traditional spark plug before being injected through small holes into the main combustion chamber, thereby igniting the air/fuel mixture that is in the main combustion chamber, courtesy of the main fuel injector. Demonstrations of this technology operating in its different modes have shown to increase the brake thermal efficiency of the engine over conventional gasoline combustion engines. The goal of the technology is to increase fuel efficiency and decrease CO2 and NOx emissions, which will help the engine meet proposed Euro7 emissions standards.

=== Chassis and Body ===
The Aurora's design exposes 70% of the brand-new ZM1 modular monocoque chassis, developed in collaboration with the carbon specialist Managing Composites. Made of carbon fiber, it weighs only 120 kg (265 lbs), enabling structural safety levels equivalent to those of Formula 1, with the use of composite crash structures for improved energy absorption and crash protection. Suspension hardpoints have a targeted rigidity of 63,000 newton-meters/degree.

Zenvo claims that, at 155 mph (250 km/h), the Aurora Agil variant generates 880kgs of downforce courtesy of the track-focused, aggressive styling and large rear wing featuring an air braking system.
