= Zenvo TS1 GT =

Grand touring sports car manufactured by Danish automobile manufacturer Zenvo

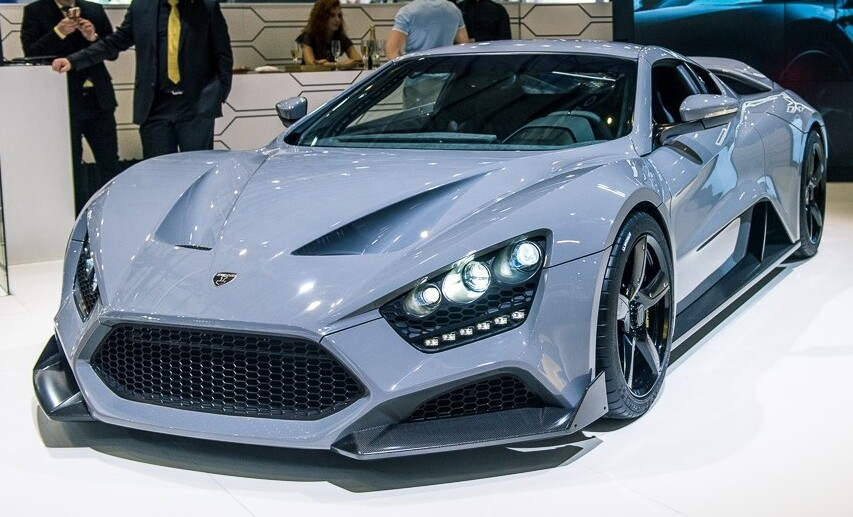

Overview
- Manufacturer: Zenvo Automotive A/S
- Production: 2016–2019 (TS1 GT); 2016–2025 (Zenvo TSR / TSR-S / TSR-GT)
- Assembly: Præstø in Zealand, Denmark
- Designer: Christian Brandt

Body and chassis
- Class: Sports car (S)
- Body style: 2-door coupé
- Layout: Rear mid-engine, rear-wheel-drive

Powertrain
- Engine: 5.8 L twin-supercharged Flat-plane V8 (GM-based)
- Transmission: 7-speed dual-clutch automatic

Dimensions
- Wheelbase: 2,906 mm (114 in)
- Length: 4,680 mm (184 in)
- Width: 2,155 mm (85 in)
- Height: 1,198 mm (47 in)
- Kerb weight: 1,580 kg (3,483 lb)

Chronology
- Predecessor: Zenvo ST1
- Successor: Zenvo Aurora (for TS1 GT)

The Zenvo TS1 GT is a limited production sports car manufactured by Danish automobile manufacturer Zenvo Automotive. It was unveiled at the 2016 Geneva Motor Show. Though the TS1 GT shares a similar chassis and body with its predecessor, the ST1, its new powertrain and upgraded interior earn it a new model designation along with the 'grand tourer' qualification. The production of the car is planned to be limited at 5 units per year, an increase from the limited 15-car total production run of its predecessor.

== Specifications ==
=== Engine ===
The Zenvo TS1 GT is powered by a 5.8-litre Twin-supercharged V8 engine which is based on a Chevrolet GM architecture and is further modified and developed in-house, rated at 823 kW (1,119 PS; 1,104 hp) at 7,100 rpm and 1,139 N⋅m (840 lb⋅ft) of torque at 5,500 rpm. The engine has mid-rear mounted position.

=== Transmission and suspension ===
The TS1 GT is equipped with a 7-speed dual-clutch automatic with helical-cut dog gears. The transmission is paired with a Torsen limited-slip differential and the clutch consists of two 240 mm (9.4 in) discs. The car uses double wishbone suspension coupled with adjustable shocks and composite anti-roll bars on the front and rear axles. A hydraulic lifting mechanism is able to raise the front axle by 50 mm for extra ground clearance.

=== Wheels ===
The TS1 GT is equipped with forged aluminum wheels with diameters of 483 millimetres (19 in) at the front and 508 millimetres (20 in) at the rear. The car uses Michelin Pilot Sport 4S or Pilot Sport Cup 2 tires with codes of 265/35 ZR 19 at the front and 345/30 ZR 20 at the rear. The brakes are ventilated carbon ceramic discs, with a diameter of 395 mm (15.6 in) at the front and 380 mm (15 in) at the rear, each equipped with six-piston aluminum calipers.

=== Interior features ===
The interior of the Zenvo TS1 GT features a dashboard and central console finished in carbon-fiber and Alcantara, along with carbon-fiber bucket seats for the driver and passenger. The infotainment system includes a dashboard display, central display, and an Alpine audio system with Bluetooth connectivity.

== Performance ==
The manufacturer claims an electronically limited top speed of 375 km/h (233 mph) for the TS1 GT. The car has a claimed 0–100 km/h (62 mph) acceleration time of 3.0 seconds. These performance figures are very similar to those of its predecessor.

== Variants ==
=== Zenvo TSR GT ===
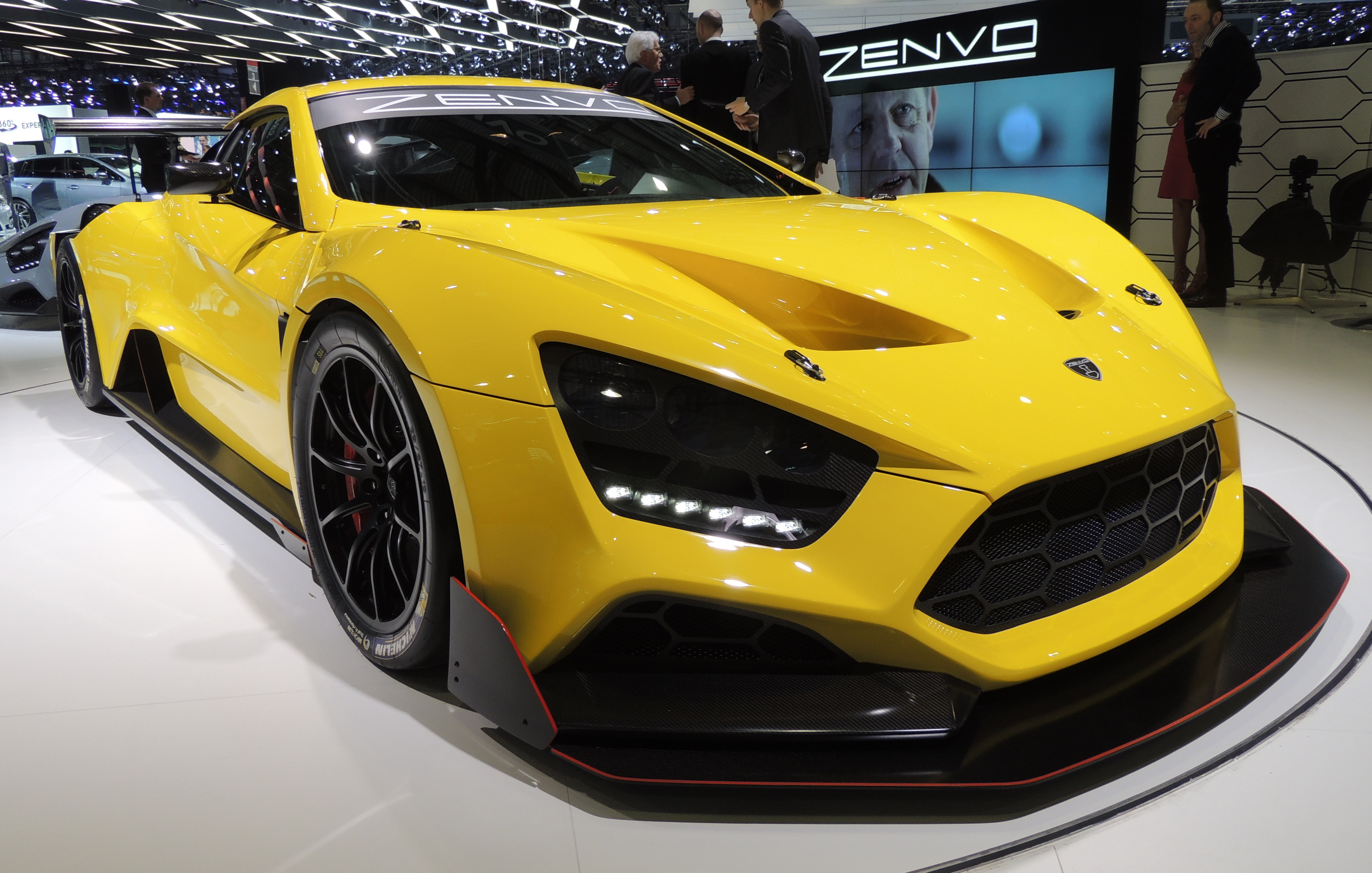
Zenvo TSR at the 2016 Geneva Motor Show .

The Zenvo TSR is a track-only version of the TS1 GT. Launched alongside the TS1 GT at the 2016 Geneva Motor Show, the TSR shares most of its mechanical components with the road-legal car, including the same engine and body.

The main changes in the TSR variant are a 250 kg (551 lb) of weight reduction reducing the total weight to 1,330 kg (2,932 lb), revised gearing and power delivery for track use, and a fixed carbon-fibre wing on the rear of the car. A larger carbon-fibre front splitter and rear diffuser have also been fitted to improve airflow at higher speeds. The TSR's interior includes a full roll cage and 6 point harnesses, with the infotainment system of the TS1 GT having been removed to save weight. As a result of the gearing and aerodynamic changes, the top speed of the TSR is reduced to 325 km/h (202 mph).

=== Zenvo TSR-S ===
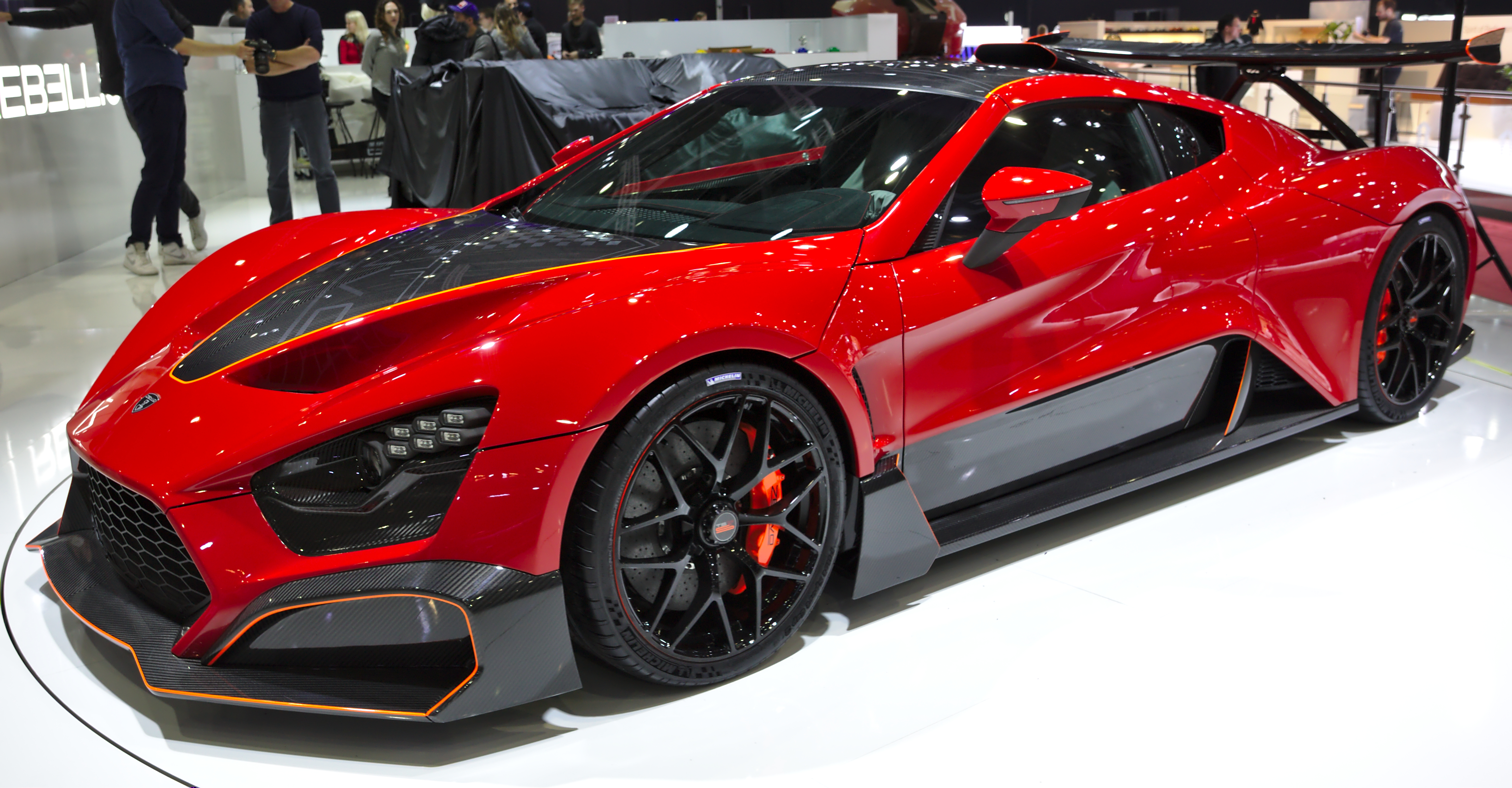
Zenvo TSR-S at the 2018 Geneva Motor Show.

The Zenvo TSR-S is a road-legal version of the track-focused Zenvo TSR. Unveiled at the 2018 Geneva Motor Show, the TSR-S features numerous upgrades and design changes compared to the previous ST1 models and sits in-between the road-going, grand touring TS1 GT and the race-focused, track only TSR.

On the exterior of the car, the TSR-S has been redesigned with a larger front grille and large integrated splitter and diffuser. The carbon-fiber wing on the rear of the car is able to rotate with two degrees of freedom, allowing for air braking and corner stabilization. The interior of the car is driver focused as the TSR as standard, however many features of the TS1 GT can be optioned into the car like a sound system and climate control. Weight savings on the TSR-S sum to 85 kg (187 lb) over the TS1 GT, bringing the total weight of the car down to 1,495 kg (3,296 lb).

The powertrain of the TSR-S has also been updated, and the 5.8-liter twin-supercharged V8 now rated at 878 kW (1,194 PS; 1,177 hp) at 8,500 rpm. The manufacturer claims that this performance increase allows the TSR-S to accelerate from 0–100 km/h (62 mph) in 2.8 seconds, and from 0–200 km/h (124 mph) in 6.8 seconds. The TSR-S maintains the 325 km/h (202 mph) top speed of the TSR.

=== Zenvo TSR-GT ===
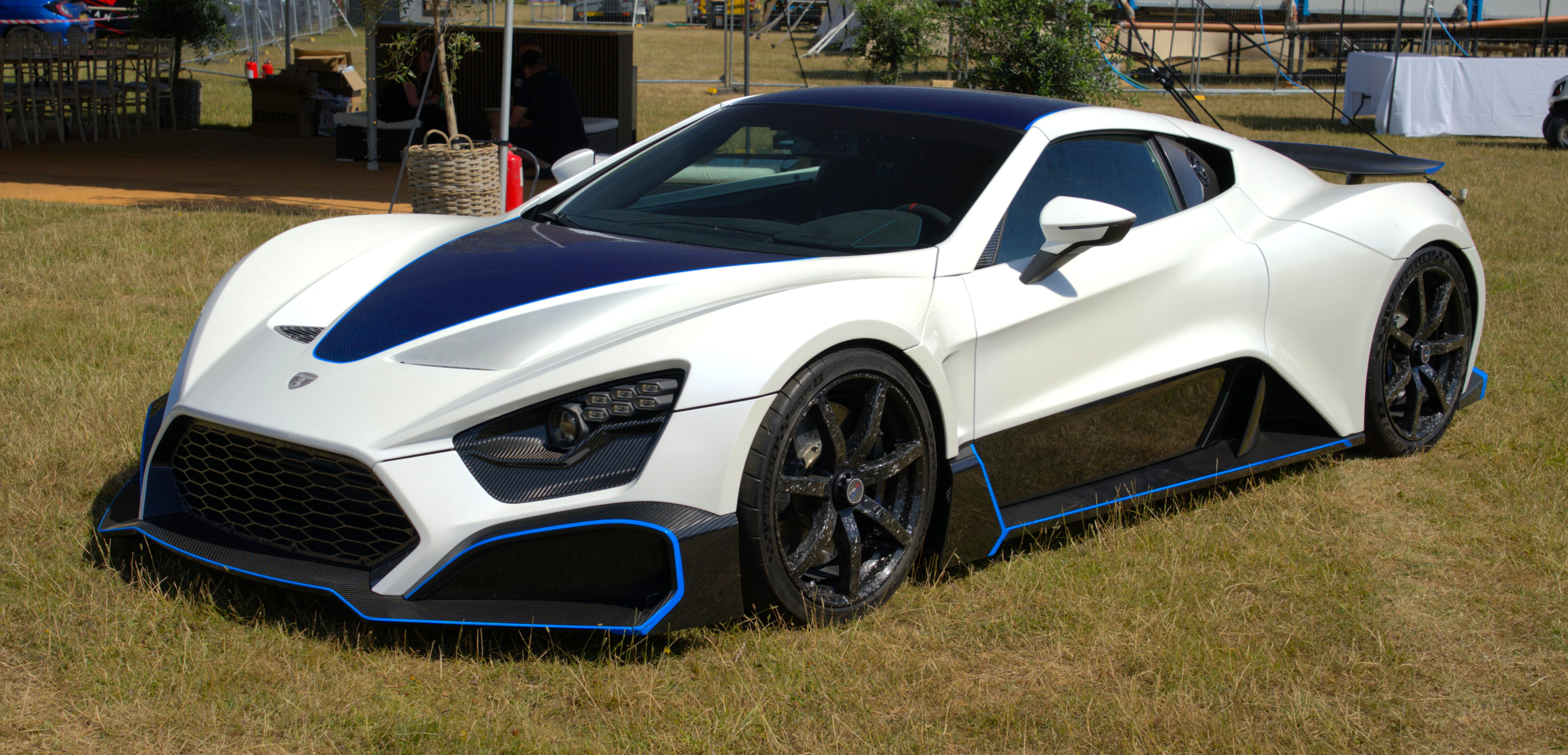
Zenvo TSR-GT

The Zenvo TSR-GT is a grand-touring oriented version of the TSR-S. The primary differences include an uprated version of the 5.8-liter twin-supercharged V8 now producing 1,014 kW (1,379 PS; 1,360 hp), and a reduced downforce setup with a smaller, fixed wing and aerodynamic wheel covers. These changes increase the claimed top speed of the TSR-GT to 423 km/h (263 mph). The TSR-GT also features a more luxury-oriented interior, with leather upholstery in place of bare carbon fiber of previous TSR models and measures to reduce cabin noise.

== See also ==
- List of production cars by power output
