= Tokai University Boarding School in Denmark =

Tokai University Boarding School
- 東海大学付属デンマーク校中学部・高等部

Location
- Evensølundvej 5, 4720 Præstø, Denmark; Præstø; Denmark; 55.132°N 12.008°E

Information
- Type: Private high school
- Established: 1988
- Closed: 2008
- Website: tubs.dk

Tokai University Boarding School in Denmark (TUBS; 東海大学付属デンマーク校中学部・高等部 Tōkai Daigaku Fuzoku Denmāku Kō Chūgakubu Kōtōbu) was a Japanese international school in Præstø, Denmark. It was affiliated with Tokai University, and had junior high school and senior high school students. This school was an overseas branch of a Japanese private school, or a Shiritsu zaigai kyōiku shisetsu (私立在外教育施設). It was founded in 1988, and it closed in 2008.

After the school's closure, Bosei Sports College (a.k.a. Bosei Sports High School) was opened on the former campus. This school was established by local Danish authorities in conjunction with Tokai.
