= Bosei Sports College =

Folk high school in Præstø, Denmark

Coordinates: 55.132°N 12.008°E

Bosei Sports College, also known as Bosei Sports High School (Danish: Idrætshøjskolen Bosei), is a folk high school (non-degree granting educational institution for adults) in Præstø, Denmark, in the campus of the former Tokai University Boarding School in Denmark, a Japanese boarding school. This school was established by local Danish authorities in conjunction with Tokai University, which had operated the boarding school.
