= Pauline Worm =

Danish writer and feminist

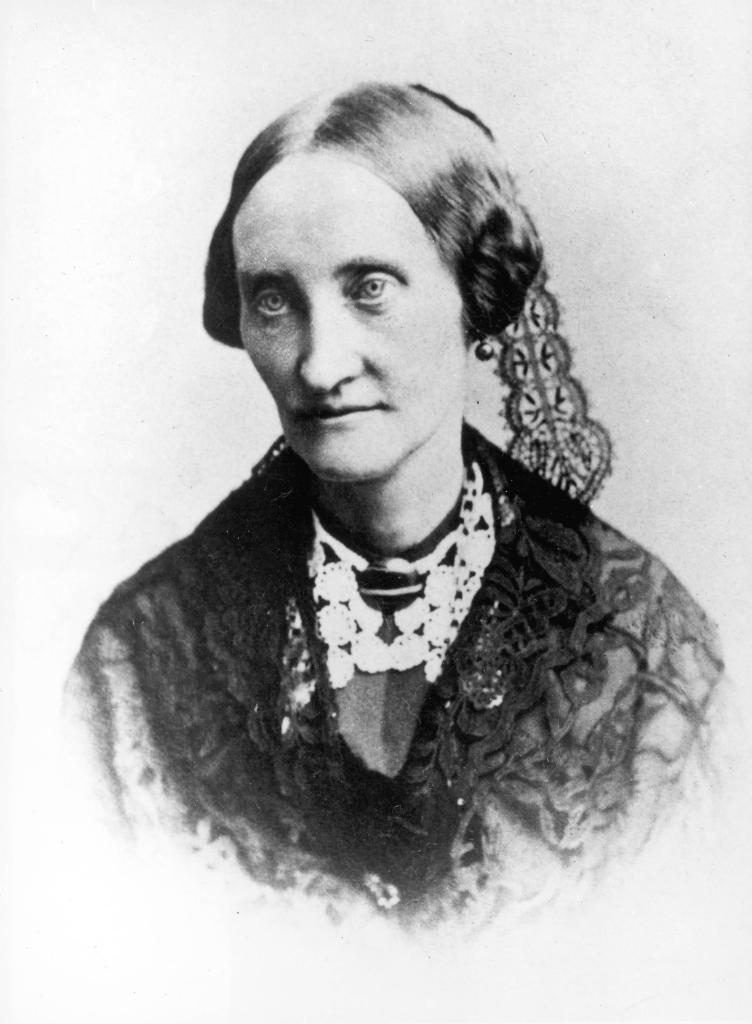
Pauline Worm

Pauline Frederikke Worm (1825–1883) was a Danish writer, poet, schoolteacher and feminist. She is remembered as being the first Danish woman to speak in public (from 1864). She expressed her ideas on women's emancipation in her writings and speeches and fought for better opportunities for women's education.

== Biography ==
Worm was born on 29 November 1825 in Hyllested near Randers, the daughter of Theodora Petrine Hjort (1800–81) and Peter Worm (1788–1865), the parish priest who was an ardent, politically minded patriot. He educated Pauline and her two younger sisters while his wife took care of the rectory. When she was only nine, she tried to persuade her uncle, the politician Lauritz la Cour, to have the law changed so that women could vote. In 1838, Worm was sent to the girls school in Randers where she stayed on to be a teacher. From 1847, she worked as a private tutor in Præstø. When Frederick VII came to the throne in 1848, she wrote a patriotic poem of praise for him which was published in the newspaper Fædrelandet, providing evidence of her poetic talents. While in Præstø, she also wrote En Krands af ni Blade (1850), a poetry anthology, and De Fornuftige, a novel which was not published until 1857.

In 1852, after spending a year in Copenhagen, she qualified as a headmistress and set up a school for 12 girls in Randers the following year. In 1857, she opened a larger school in Aarhus but as neither succeeded, she returned to her family home in Randers where she took in private pupils. After her mother died in 1881, she moved to Copenhagen where she was successful in having a proposal for a teaching diploma accepted. She also strove to have Danish school education concentrate more on the Danish language than on German.

From 1864, she turned her attention to public speaking, making addresses on a variety of subjects on education and topics of current interest, including women's affairs and future developments for women. Her speeches also demonstrated her increasing concern for Danish patriotism and the teachings of N. F. S. Grundtvig.

Pauline Worm died on 13 December 1883 in Copenhagen.

== Selected publications ==
- En Krands af 9 Blade, poetry (1850)
- Fire Breve om Clara Raphael, letters (1851)
- De Fornuftige. En dansk Roman, novel (1857)
- Vår og Høst (poetry, 1864)
- Vår og Høst (expanded, 1874)
