= Zenvo Automotive =

Danish sports car manufacturer

Zenvo Automotive A/S
- Formerly: Nordic Sports Car A/S (2007–2009)
- Type: Aktieselskab
- Industry: Automotive
- Founded: 2007; 19 years ago
- Founders: Jesper Jensen; Troels Vollertsen
- Headquarters: Præstø, Zealand, Denmark
- Key people: Jens Sverdrup (Chairman & CCO); Jon Gunner (CEO/CTO); Christian Brandt (Head of design)
- Products: Sports cars
- Website: zenvoautomotive.com

Zenvo Automotive A/S is a Danish sports car manufacturer located in Præstø on the Danish Island of Zealand. Co-founded in 2007 by Jesper Jensen and Troels Vollertsen, the company ran under the name Nordic Sports Car A/S until 2009 when the company was rebranded to Zenvo Automotive to tie in the reveal of the ST1. In June 2018, the company was sold to Czech investors, based in Prague. The name 'Zenvo' is derived from a combination of the last three and first two letters in Vollertsen's last name.

== History ==
Zenvo Automotive was founded in 2007. The first prototype of what became the Zenvo ST1 was completed in December 2008, and production began in 2009. Only 15 Zenvo ST1 cars were built and sold.

In April 2018, Bil Magasinet reported that despite Zenvo's feelings that their cars were too expensive for the home market, for the first time a Zenvo was sold to a Danish customer. It was a red Zenvo TSR-S, sold for DKK 10.5 million (US$1.65 million).

In 2019, Jens Sverdrup became an advisor, setting the vision for the planned V12-powered Aurora models and beyond. In 2021, Jens Sverdrup took a position as chairman and CCO.

In 2022, the TSR-GT model was launched with a production run of three units.

In August 2023, the Zenvo Aurora Agil and Tur models were unveiled at The Quail during Monterey Car Week. In July 2024, Jon Gunner took the position of CTO and took responsibility for developing and leading the engineering team towards the production start of the Aurora model. Jon previously worked with Jens Sverdrup at Koenigsegg and Czinger where he held CTO and technical director positions. In 2026, Jon Gunner took over as CEO.

== Models ==
- Zenvo ST1 (2009–2016)
- Zenvo TS1 (2016–2019)
  - Zenvo TS1 GT (2016–2019) Road-going grand tourer
  - Zenvo TSR (2016–2025) Track-only sports car
    - Zenvo TSR-S (2018–2025) Road-legal version of the TSR
    - Zenvo TSR-GT (2022-2025) 3 units of the last of the TSR series
- Zenvo Aurora (expected in 2027) V12 hybrid sports car
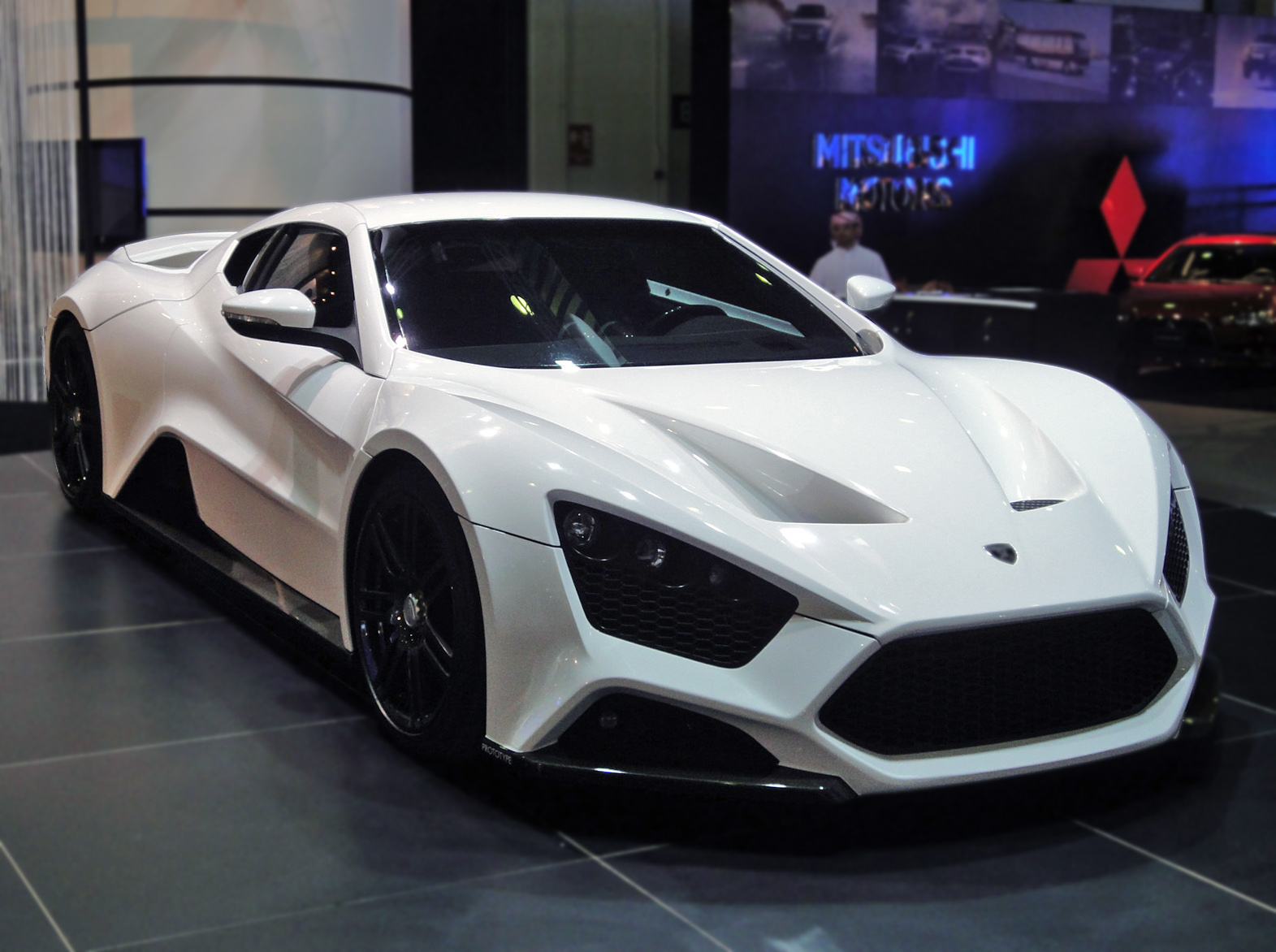
ST1

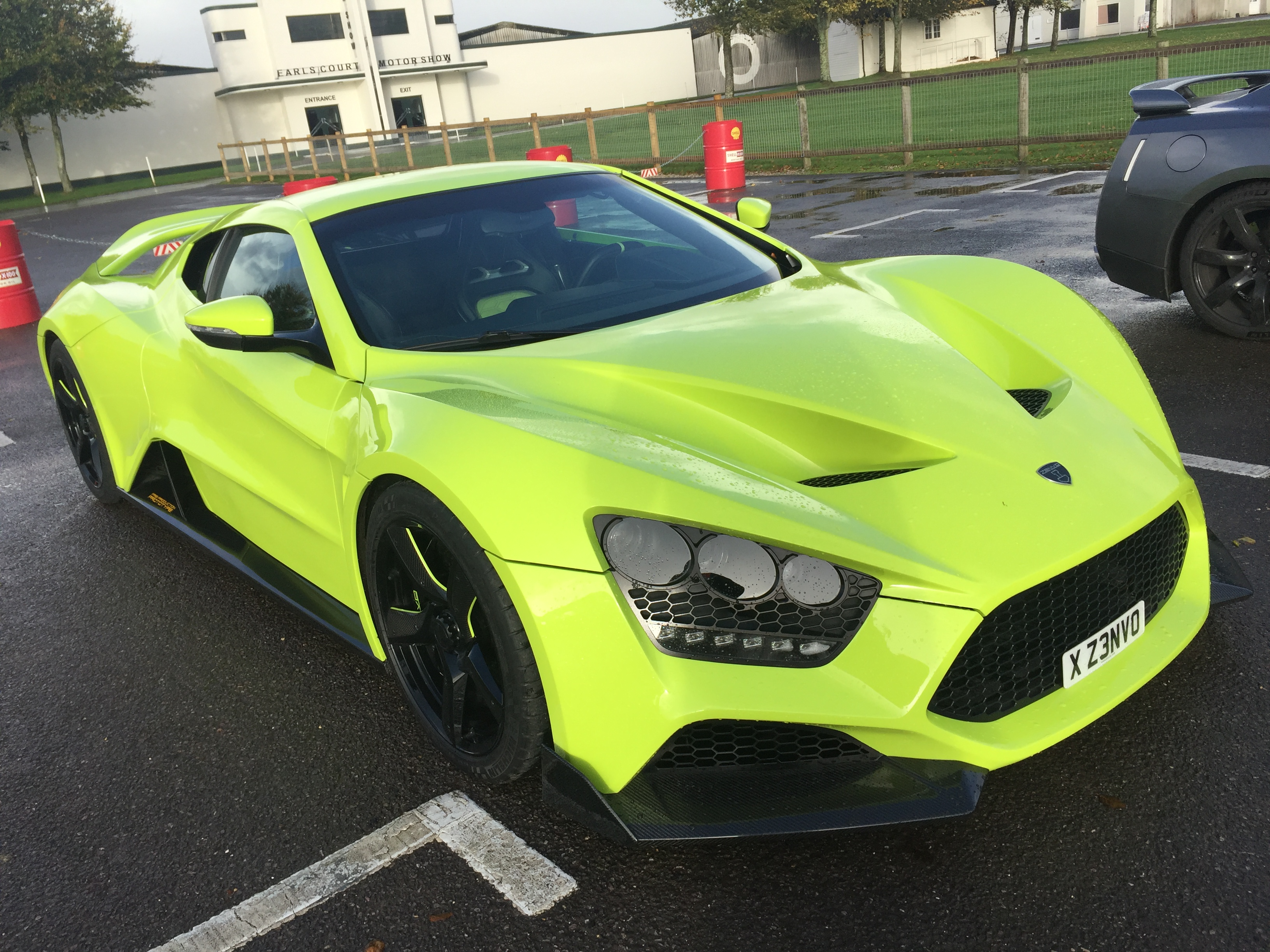
TS1

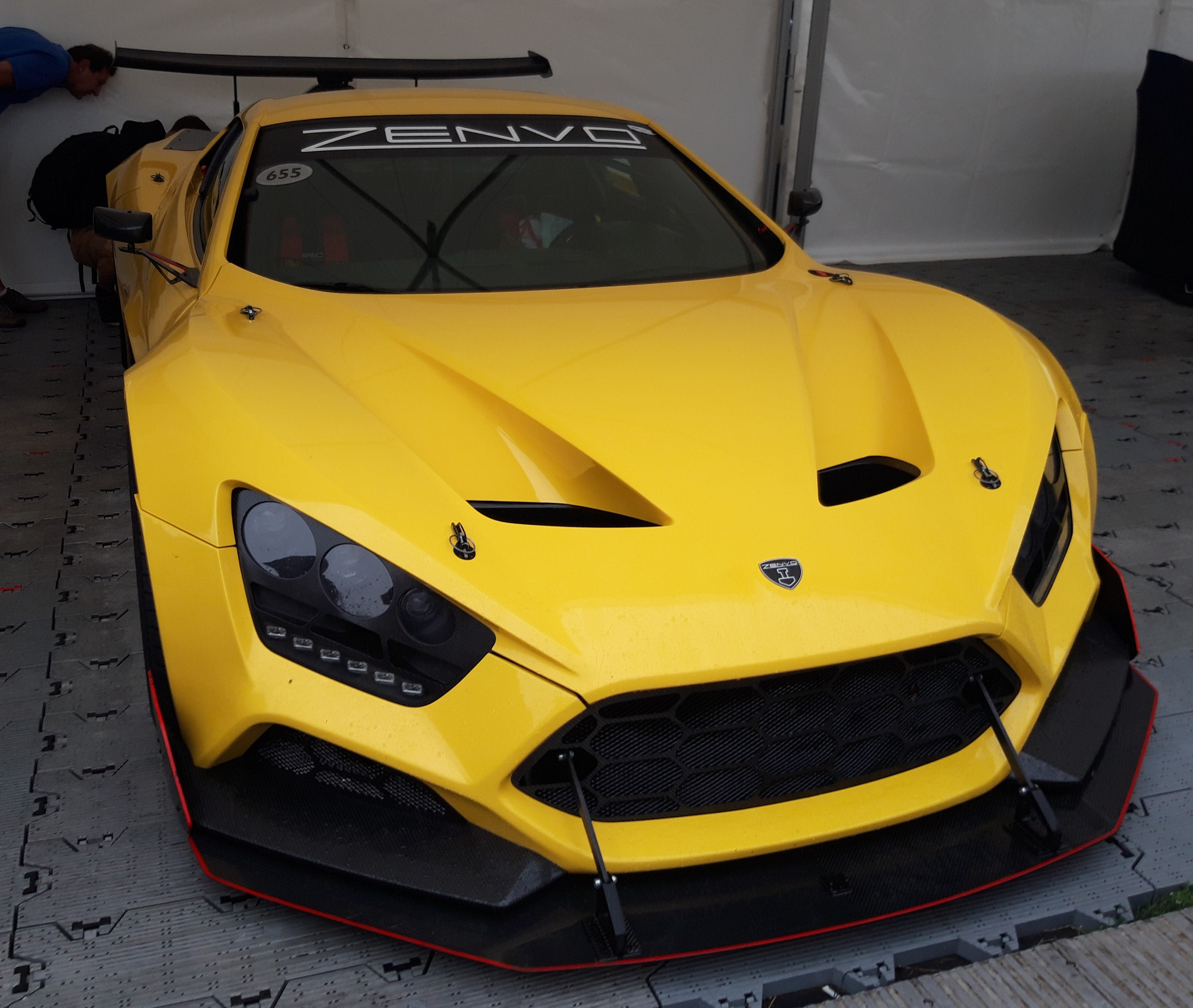
TSR

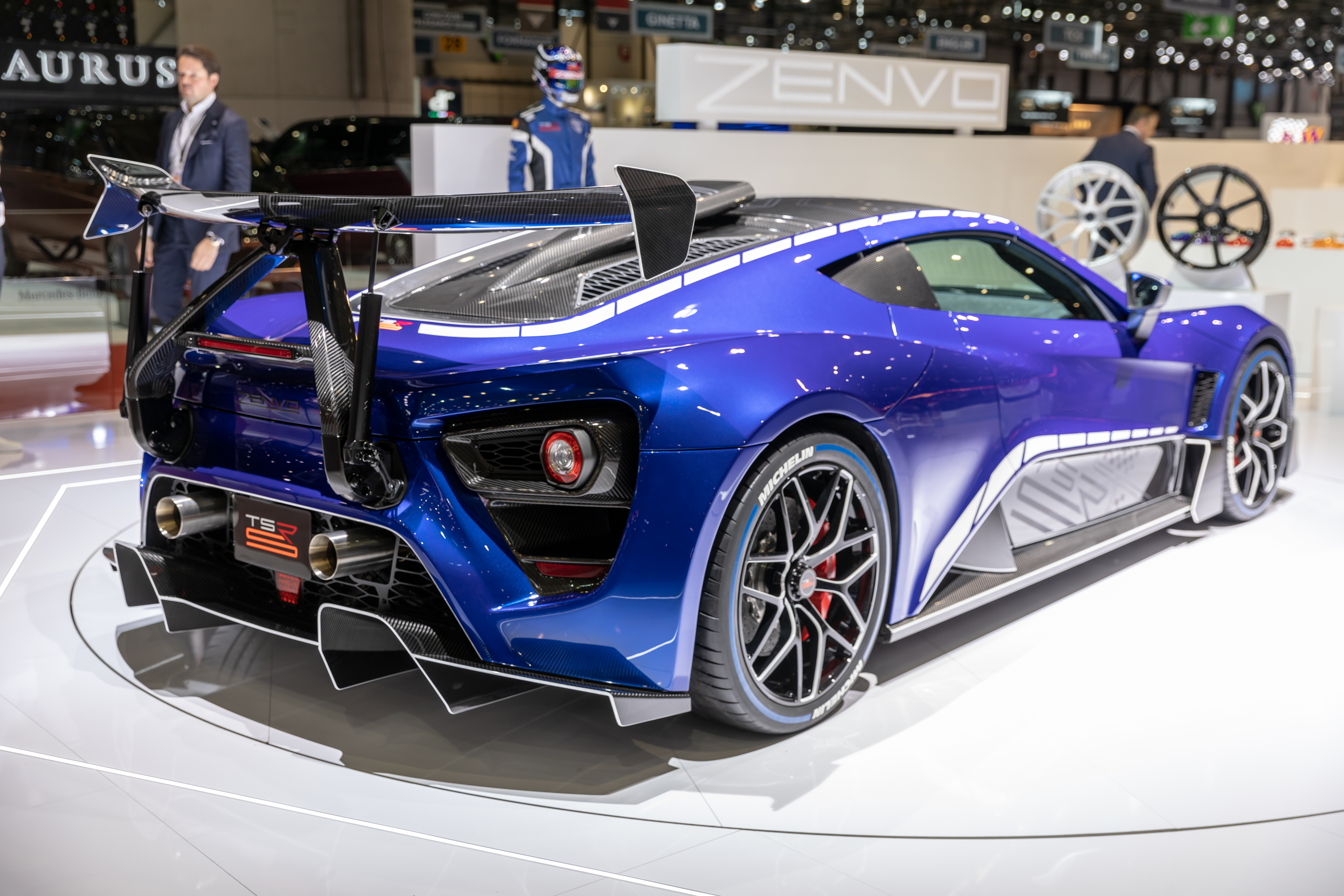
TSR-S

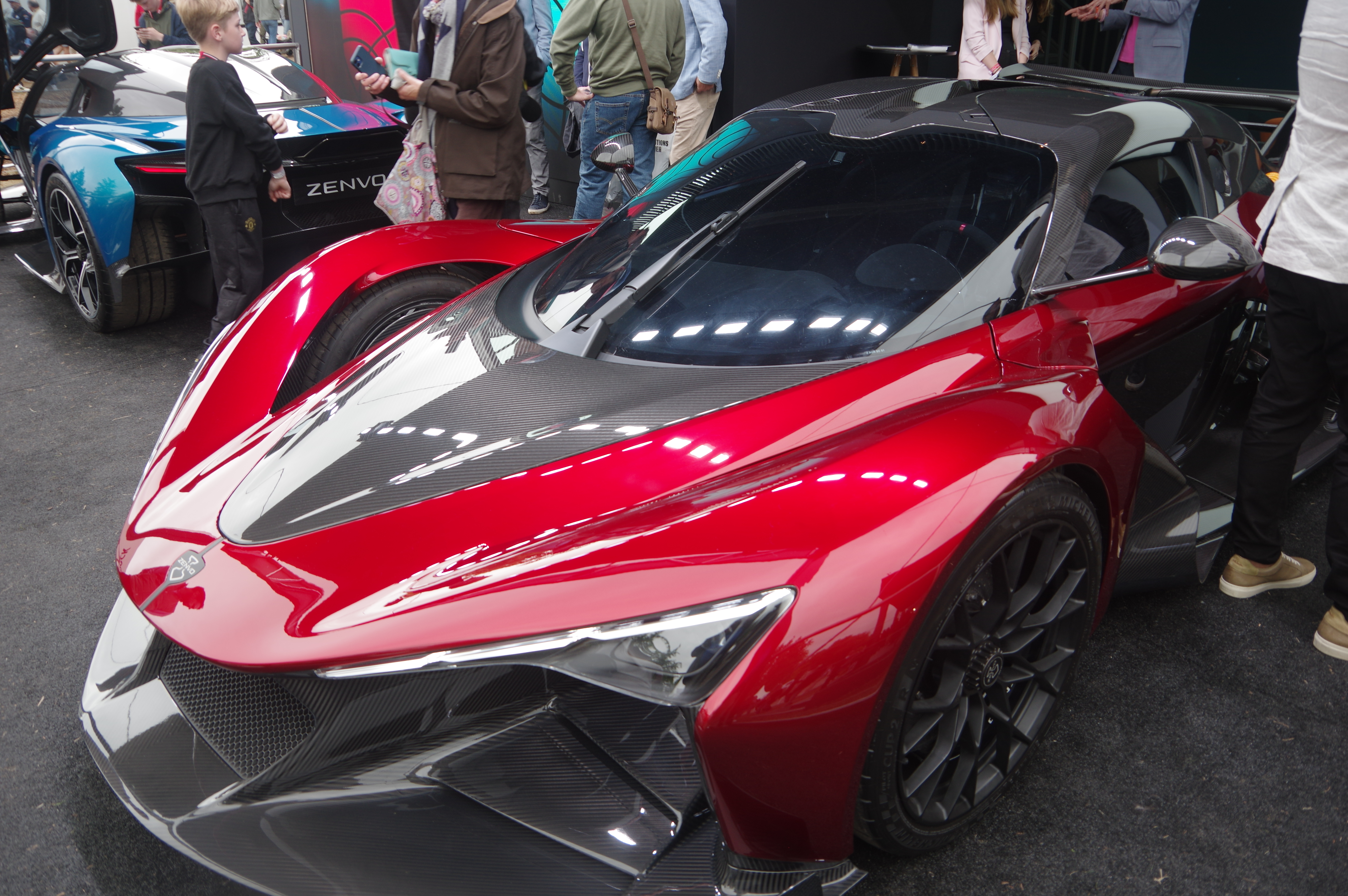
Aurora Agil
