= Præstø =

- Town
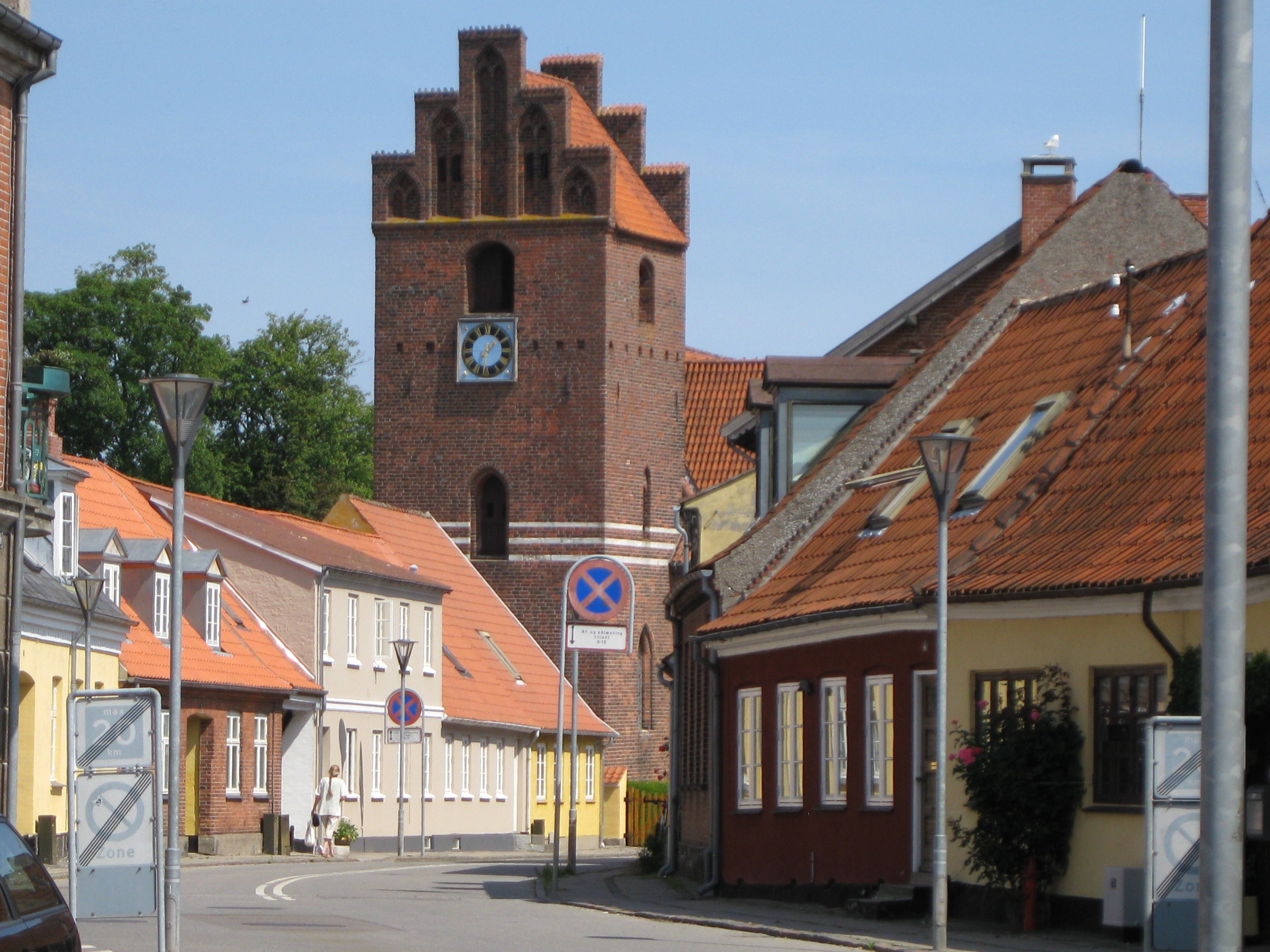
- Præstø Church - seen from west

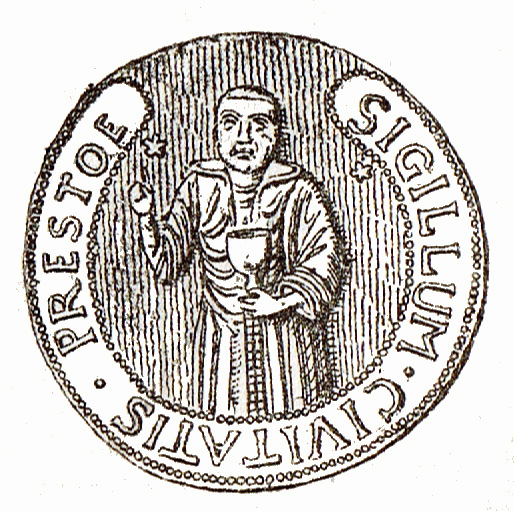
- Seal Coat of arms
- Nickname: Gøngernes By
- Location in Denmark Præstø (Denmark Region Zealand)
- Coordinates: 55°7′14″N 12°2′37″E
- Country: Denmark
- Region: Zealand (Sjælland)
- Municipality: Vordingborg

Area
  - Urban: 2.6 km^{2} (1.0 sq mi)

Population (2026)
  - Urban: 4,028
  - Urban density: 1,500/km^{2} (4,000/sq mi)
  - Municipal: 44,831
  - Municipal density: 73/km^{2} (190/sq mi)
  - Demonym: Præstøer
- Time zone: UTC+1 (Central Europe Time)
  - Summer (DST): UTC+2
- Postal codes: 4720
- Area code: (+45) 9

Præstø (Danish pronunciation: [ˈpʰʁæstˌøˀ]) is a town with a population of 4,028 (1 January 2026) in Vordingborg Municipality in Region Sjælland on the east coast of the island of Zealand (Sjælland).

The islands of Maderne, Storeholm, and Lilleholm are part of the Præstø Fjord wildlife reserves (Præstø Fjord Vildtreservat).

== History ==
Præstø became crown property in 1353. In 1304, it was incorporated as a market town.

Præstø was the seat of the former Præstø municipality (Danish, kommune). As of January 1, 2007, Præstø municipality ceased to exist as the result of Kommunalreformen ("The Municipality Reform" of 2007). It was merged with Langebæk, Møn, and Vordingborg municipalities to form an enlarged Vordingborg municipality. This created a municipality with an area of 615 km^{2} (237 sq mi) and a total population of 46,307 (2005). The municipality belongs to the new Region Sjælland ("Zealand Region").

The former Prøstø municipality covered an area of 107 km^{2} (41 sq mi), and had a total population of 7,608 (2005). Its last mayor was Ole Møller Madsen, a member of the Venstre (Liberal Party) political party.

== Education ==
Bosei Sports High School, a folk high school, is located in Præstø, in the former Tokai University Boarding School in Denmark campus. The Tokai school was a Japanese boarding school.

== Zenvo ==
The sports car company Zenvo Automotive is headquartered here. They are known for making the Zenvo ST1.

== Notable people ==
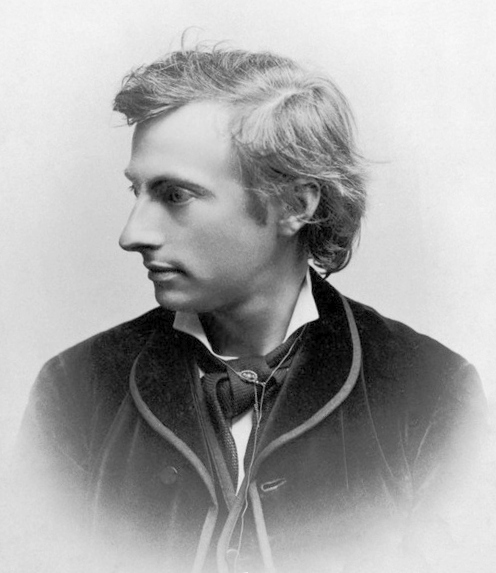
Karl Gjellerup, 1890

- N. F. S. Grundtvig (1783–1872) a Danish pastor, author, poet, philosopher, historian, teacher and politician. In 1821 he was granted the country living of Præstø and stayed a year.
- Pauline Worm (1825–1883) a Danish writer, poet, schoolteacher and feminist, a private tutor in Præstø 1847–1851
- Henry Johnson (1854 in Amendrup near Præstø – 1941) an American farmer, logger, businessman and politician, emigrated 1873.
- Karl Adolph Gjellerup (1857 in Roholte vicarage at Præstø – 1919) a Danish poet and novelist, shared the Nobel Prize in Literature in 1917
- Henrik Grønvold (1858 in Præstø – 1940) a Danish naturalist and artist, known for his illustrations of birds
- Knud Olsen (1919 in Præstø – 2010) a builder and designer of boats, designed the OK Dinghy.
- Poul Thomsen (1922 in Præstø – 1988) a Danish film actor

== See also ==
- Nysø Manor
- Oremandsgaard
