= Zenvo ST1 =

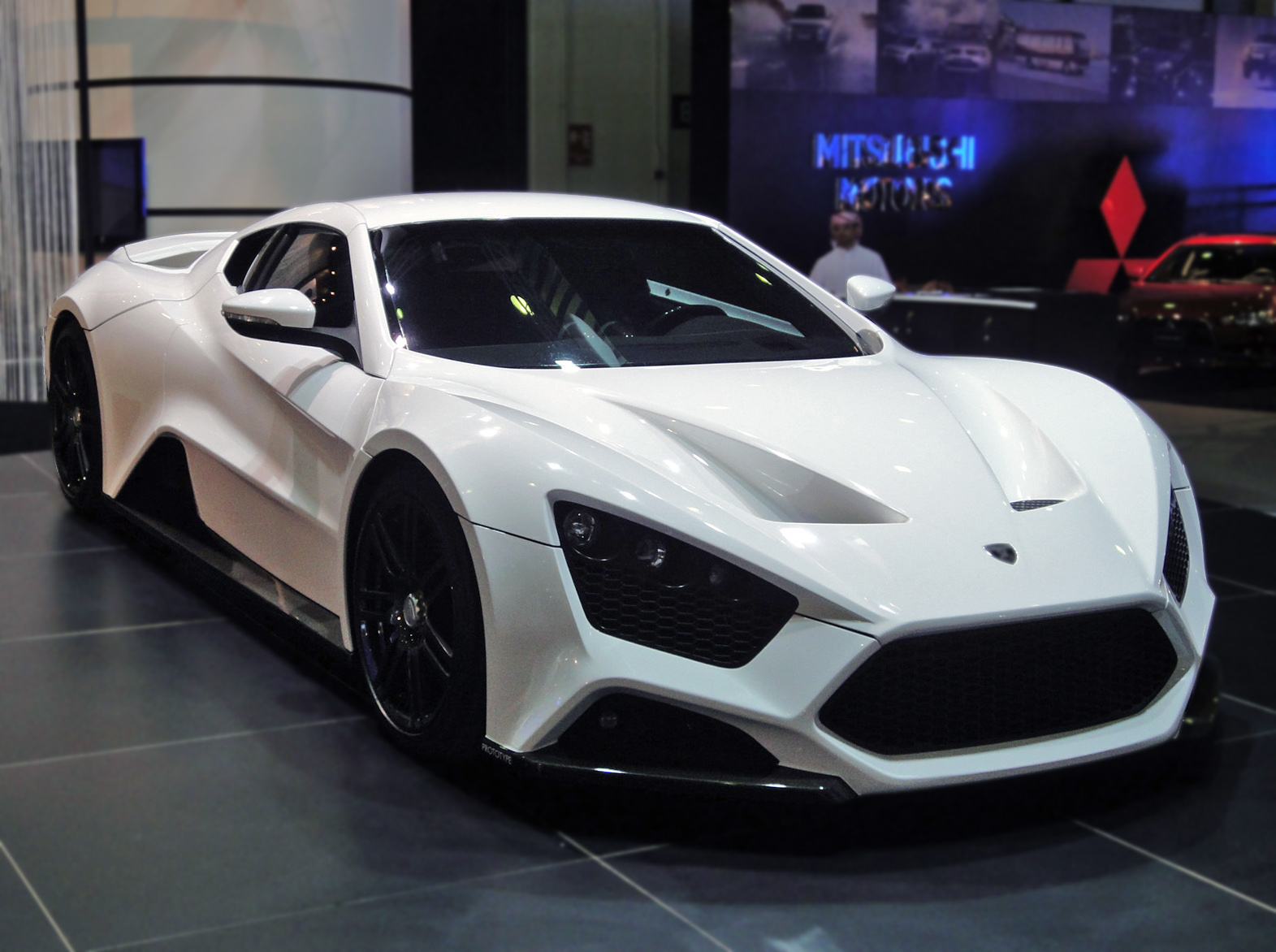

Overview
- Manufacturer: Zenvo Automotive A/S
- Production: 2009–2016 (15 Units)
- Assembly: Zealand, Denmark
- Designer: Christian Brandt and Jesper Hermann

Body and chassis
- Class: Sports car (S)
- Body style: 2-door coupé
- Layout: Mid-engined, rear wheel drive

Powertrain
- Engine: 7.0 L Twincharged LS7 V8
- Power output: 1,104 PS (1,089 bhp; 812 kW)
- Transmission: CIMA 7-speed automated manual 6-speed manual

Dimensions
- Wheelbase: 3,055 mm (120.3 in)
- Length: 4,665 mm (183.7 in)
- Width: 2,041 mm (80.4 in)
- Height: 1,198 mm (47.2 in)
- Curb weight: 1,688 kg (3,721 lb)

Chronology
- Successor: Zenvo TS1 GT

The Zenvo ST1 is a high-performance sports car manufactured by Danish company Zenvo Automotive. It was the company's first model and was manufactured almost entirely by hand by a small team of workers using a CNC router.

== Specifications ==
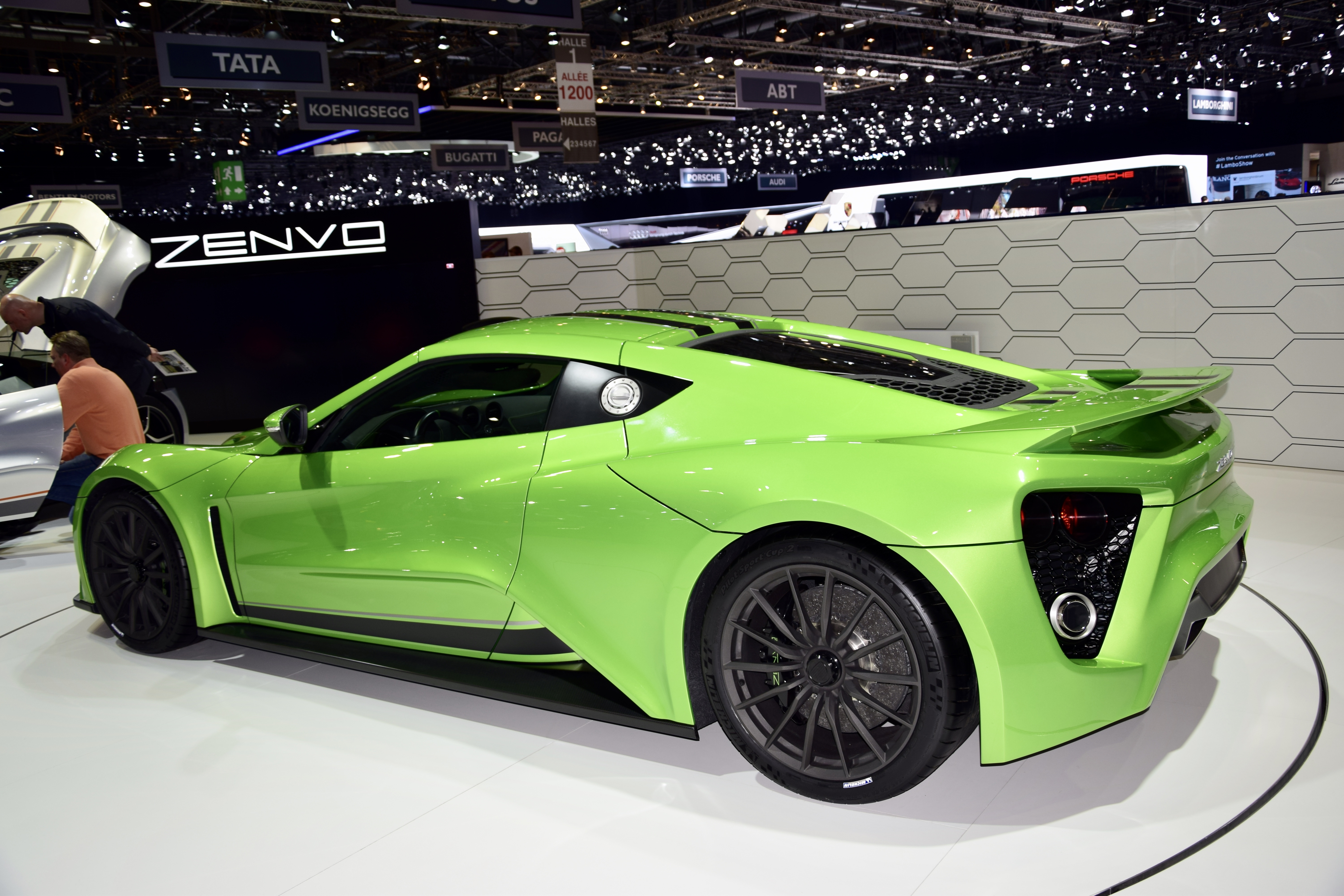
Zenvo ST1 at the 2015 Geneva Motor Show

The ST1 is powered by a twincharged 7,011 cc (7.0 L; 427.8 cu in) General Motors LS7 V8 engine that generates 1,104 PS (1,089 bhp; 812 kW) at 6,900 rpm and 1,430 N⋅m (1,055 lb⋅ft) of torque at 4,500 rpm. According to The Motor Report, the car set a 0–100 km/h (62 mph) time of 3.0 seconds, with 0–200 km/h (124 mph) taking 8.9 seconds, and an electronically limited top speed of 375 km/h (233 mph).

The ST1 is hand made along with the use of a high-performance, five-axis CNC router. It comes equipped with keyless entry, satellite navigation, telescopic steering wheel adjustment, and electrically adjustable leather racing seats.

The car has a list price of €660,000. The price for registering the car in Denmark is around DKK 16 million (€2,143,952) as a result of the country's high registration taxes; however, Zenvo is aiming only at the export markets. Production was limited to 15 cars.

== Design ==
Zenvo claims the ST1 is entirely a result of Danish design by Christian Brandt and Jesper Hermann. The carbon fibre body was made in Germany and many components such as gauges, gas tank, ABS brakes, traction control and airbags come from American or German made cars.

== Fires ==
=== Top Gear ===
The British motoring program Top Gear critically panned the Zenvo ST1 after a series of unfortunate accidents while filming a segment for the show, including the car catching fire after a cooling unit failure. Another car from the company eventually finished a complete, timed lap of the (wet) Top Gear Test Track; the resulting time was worse than the time of a BMW M5 that was also on a wet track.

The company responded to Top Gear with a statement published on the Danish website Pro Street.

=== Copenhagen Historic Grand Prix 2015 ===
A 2010 Zenvo ST1 development car caught fire at the 2015 Copenhagen Historic Grand Prix, forcing the driver to bail out. The car was to provide charity rides to fund programs for the children's program at a Danish hospital. Company representatives stated fuel line problems caused the fire.

== See also ==
- List of production cars by power output
