= W16 engine =

German 16-cylinder piston engine

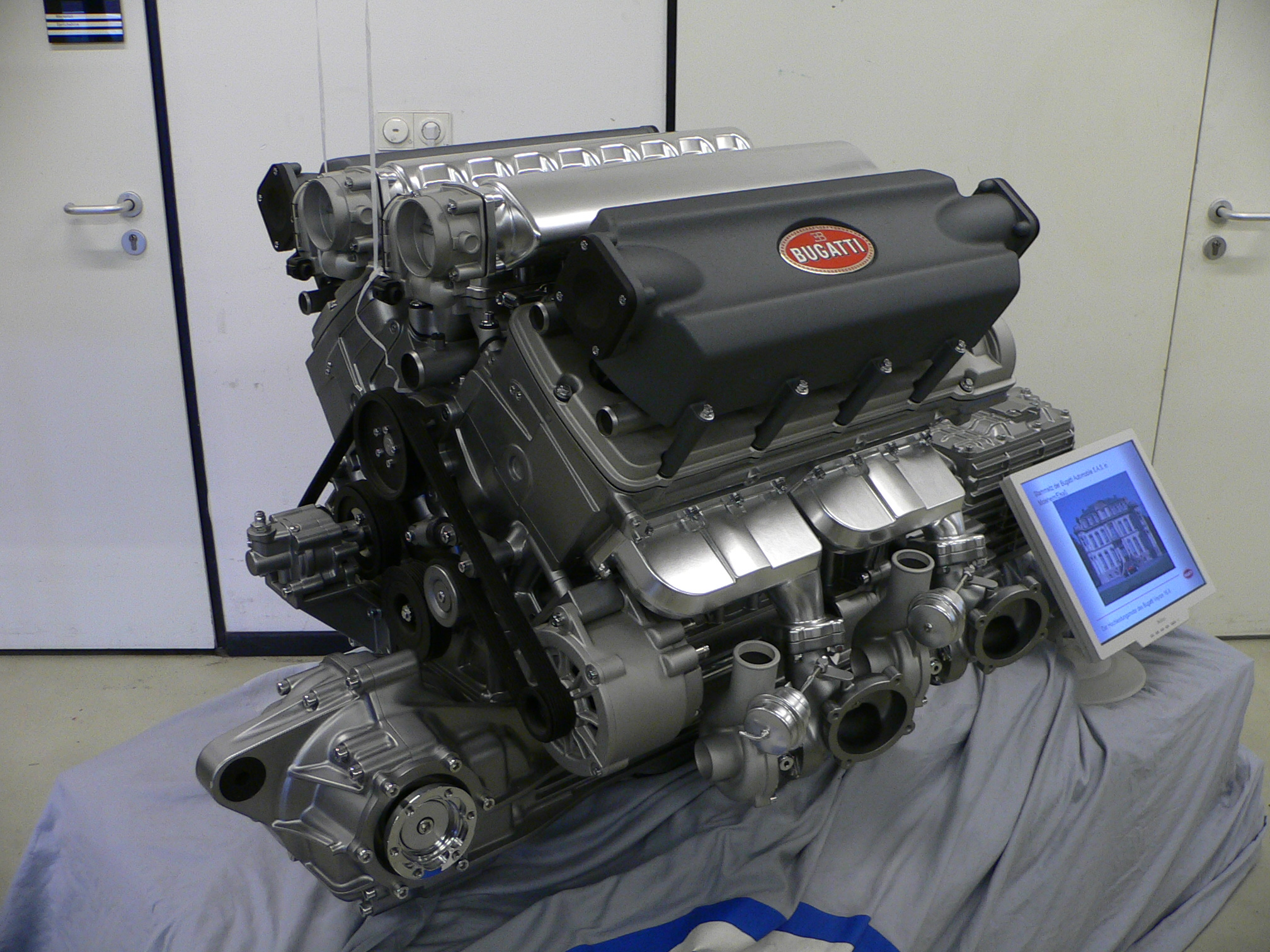
2005–2011 Bugatti Veyron engine

A W16 engine is a sixteen-cylinder piston engine with four banks of four cylinders in a W configuration.

W16 engines are rarely produced, with the notable exception of the Volkswagen Group 8.0 WR16 engine, which has been used since 2005 in the Bugatti Veyron, Bugatti Chiron and their related models.

== Volkswagen Group ==
Bugatti Veyron Grand Sport

The W16 engine that Volkswagen Group uses in its Bugatti Veyron and Chiron has a displacement of 8.0 L (488 cu in) and four turbochargers. It is effectively two narrow-angle VR8 engines (based on the VR6 design) mated at an included angle of 90 degrees on a common crankshaft.

The most powerful version of this engine, installed in the Bugatti Bolide, generates 1,361 kW (1,825 hp; 1,850 PS) at 7,000 rpm.

At the 1999 Geneva Auto Salon, Bentley presented Hunaudières, a concept two-seated mid-engined car with an 8-litre W16 engine. The engine was the basis for the Bugatti Veyron.

Another concept car from Volkswagen Group to have the W16 engine is the Audi Rosemeyer, introduced in 2000 and shown at various auto salons. The engine fitted to Rosemeyer is the only W16 variation to have five valves per cylinder.

== Other manufacturers ==
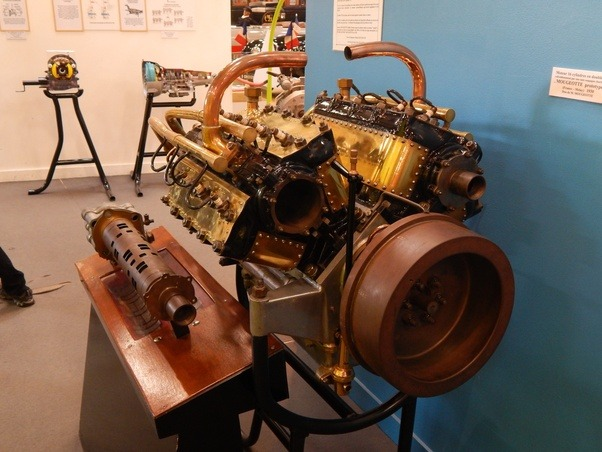
1916 Gaston Mougeotte W16 engine

In 1916, a rotary valve W16 engine was built in France by Gaston Mougeotte.

The Jimenez Novia, a one-off sports car built in 1995, used a W16 engine with two crankshafts. Built by combining four Yamaha FZR1000 inline-four motorcycle engines, the engine has a displacement of 4.0 L (244 cu in), eight camshafts and five valves per cylinder, and produces 560 bhp (418 kW; 568 PS).

== See also ==
- Flat-sixteen engine
- V16 engine
