= Bugatti Bolide =

Overview
- Manufacturer: Bugatti Engineering GmbH; Bugatti Automobiles S.A.S.
- Production: 2024–2025 (40 units)
- Model years: 2024–2025
- Assembly: France: Molsheim (Bugatti Molsheim Plant)
- Designer: Nils Sajonz, Florian Westermann, Artur Hindalong, Jan Schmid, Max Lask

Body and chassis
- Class: Sports car (S)
- Body style: 2-door coupé
- Layout: Mid-engine, all-wheel-drive
- Platform: Bugatti Chiron
- Doors: 2-Butterfly doors
- Chassis: Carbon Fiber Monocoque
- Related: Bugatti Chiron; Bugatti Veyron; Bugatti Vision Gran Turismo

Powertrain
- Engine: 7,993 cc (488 cu in; 8 L) quad-turbocharged W16
- Power output: concept power: 1,362 kW (1,826 hp; 1,852 PS); concept torque: 1,475 pound-feet (2,000 N⋅m); production power: 1,177 kW (1,578 hp; 1,600 PS); production torque: 1,180 pound-feet (1,600 N⋅m)
- Transmission: 7-speed dual-clutch automatic

Dimensions
- Wheelbase: 2,750 mm (108.3 in)
- Length: 4,835 mm (190.4 in)
- Width: 2,100 mm (82.7 in)
- Height: 1,047 mm (41.2 in)
- Kerb weight: concept: 1,240 kg (2,734 lb); production: 1,450 kg (3,197 lb)

Chronology
- Predecessor: Bugatti Vision Gran Turismo (Spiritual)

The Bugatti Bolide is a track-only sports car developed by Bugatti Engineering GmbH in Wolfsburg, Germany, and Bugatti Automobiles and manufactured in Molsheim, by French automobile manufacturer Bugatti Automobiles S.A.S.. It was revealed online on 28 October 2020. According to Bugatti, the concept version of the Bolide is using the W16 engine with a weight-to-power-ratio of 0.91 kg/kW (0.67 kg/PS; 1.50 lb/hp). Bugatti announced the Bolide would be the last car ever made with their 8.0 liter W16 engine with four turbochargers. The Bolide's name comes from the ancient Greek word βολίς, which literally means "spear" then used in old French as le bolide to describe "the meteorite blazing across the sky", in reference to its speed.

In April 2023, Bugatti revealed the production version of the Bolide as a track-only sports car. 40 units are to be built and the first vehicles were delivered to customers at the beginning of 2024.

The Bugatti Bolide made its Southern Hemisphere debut in February 2025 as part of the Adelaide Motorsport Festival, taking place in the Australian city of Adelaide.

== Specifications and performance ==
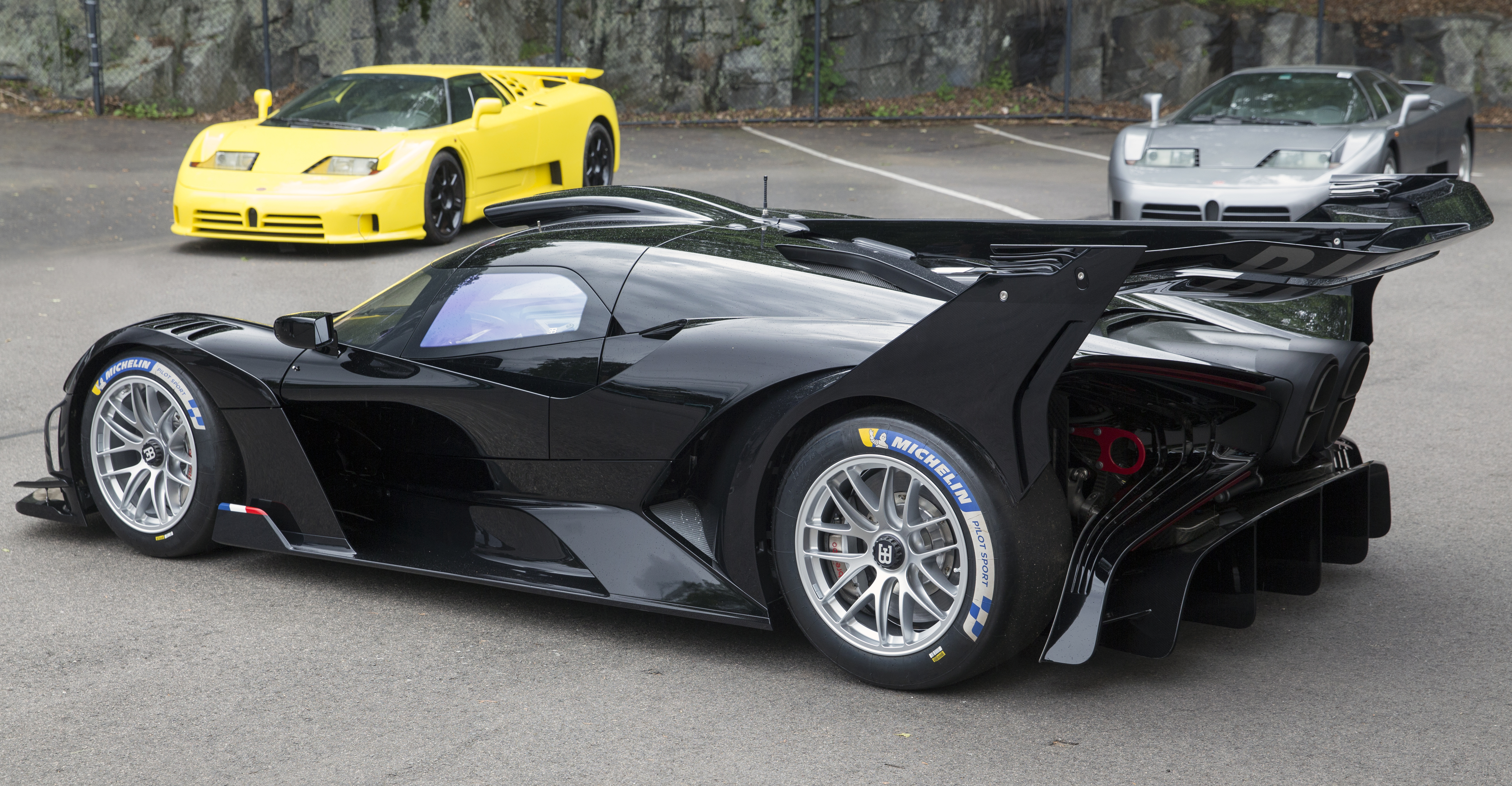
Bugatti Bolide rear 3/4 view

The concept Bolide is built using the framework of the same 8 L (490 cu in) quad-turbo W16 engine and the 7-speed dual-clutch automatic transmission used in the Chiron, although upgrades to the W16 engine allow the Bolide to generate over 1,361 kW (1,825 hp; 1,850 PS) and 2,000 N⋅m (1,475 lb⋅ft) of torque, 183 kW (245 hp; 248 PS), more than the Chiron Super Sport 300+. This increase in power can be attributed to bigger blades in the turbochargers and the different orientation of the turbochargers themselves. Combining the fact that the kerb weight of the car is only 1,240 kg (2,733.7 lb), the Bolide can accelerate from 0–100 km/h (62 mph) in 2.2 seconds, 0–200 km/h (124 mph) in 4.4 seconds, 0–300 km/h (186 mph) in 7.4 seconds, 0–400 km/h (249 mph) in 12.1 seconds, and 0–500 km/h (311 mph) in 20.1 seconds and a projected top speed beyond that. Additionally, Bugatti states that the Bolide has a 0-400–0 km/h (249–0 mph) of 24.62 seconds, and a 0-500–0 km/h (311–0 mph) time of 33.62 seconds. According to Bugatti, computer simulations show that the Bolide could lap the Nürburgring in 5 minutes and 23.1 seconds, making it just four seconds slower than the current record holder, the Porsche 919 Hybrid Evo. The Bolide is also simulated to have a lap time at the Circuit de la Sarthe of just 3 minutes and 7.1 seconds, making it 7.6 seconds quicker than the current record holder, the Toyota TS050, which lapped the circuit in 3 minutes and 14.7 seconds.

The series version of the Bugatti Bolide continues to rely on the 8.0-litre W16 engine with four turbochargers with an output of 1600 PS at 7050 rpm and a torque of 1600 Nm between 3800 and 7050 rpm. This enables the standard version of the Bolide to accelerate from 0 to 100 km/h (62 mph) in 2.2 seconds, to 200 km/h (124 mph) in 5.4 seconds and to 300 km/h (186 mph) in 11.5 seconds. The top speed is electronically limited at 380 km/h (236 mph).

From 300 km/h, the Bolide series version brakes in 6 seconds and stops after 228 m (748 ft). From 200 km/h, the Bolide needs 4.2 seconds and 105 m (344 ft). From 100 km/h, the Bolide needs 2.5 seconds and 30 m (98 ft) to come to a standstill. For acceleration and full braking from 0-100-0 km/h, the Bolide needs 4.7 seconds and 74 m (243 ft). At 0-200-0 km/h it takes 9.7 seconds and 285 m (935 ft), and at 0-300-0 km/h it takes 17.5 seconds and 832 m (2,730 ft).

== Design ==
The main influence on the Bolide's light curb weight is due to the monocoque and all of its components constructed with titanium, along with nearly all of the body panels constructed in carbon fiber. Donning the aggressive design language of an LMP1 racecar (specifically the Bugatti Vision Gran Turismo concept, which preceded the Bolide), including the signature X-shape (itself inspired by the Bell X-1 aircraft), the aerodynamics of the Bolide help it generate more than 2,630 kg (5,800 lb) of downforce at 320 km/h (200 mph), with 1,810 kg (4,000 lb) at the rear wing and another 820 kg (1,800 lb) at the front wing. The height of the Bolide, 100 cm (39.2 in), matches the height of the famous Bugatti Le Mans racecar, the Bugatti Type 57C, on which much of the Bolide harkens to.

The carbon structure, developed in collaboration with Dallara, meets the same demanding LMH and LMDh requirements of the FIA (Fédération Internationale de l'Automobile) as the Le Mans race cars.

== Production ==
In August 2021, Bugatti announced at The Quail, A Motorsport Gathering in California that the production Bolide has its first delivery scheduled for 2024 at a net unit price of €4 million and limited to 40 units. Although the concept version boasted a power output of 1,361 kW (1,825 hp; 1,850 PS), this was achieved using 110-octane racing fuel. The production version will have a power output of 1,177 kW (1,578 hp; 1,600 PS) with a torque figure of 1,600 N⋅m (1,180 lbf⋅ft) at 2,250 rpm using 98 RON gas. The production version will weigh in at 1,450 kg (3,197 lb) and therefore will have a weight-to-power ratio of 1.2 kg/kW (0.9 kg/PS; 2.0 lb/hp) when 98 RON gas is used. The first production-ready cars have been delivered to customers since the beginning of 2024. Also in July 2026 Lanzante Limited unveiled a road legal Bugatti Bolide after its announcement in August 2025. There were changes to the Integrated LED Headlights, Road Signals, Mirrors, License Plate Brackets & Illumination, Raised Ground Clearance, Softened & Retuned Pushrod Suspension, Treaded Street-Performance Tires, Upgraded PRW Auxiliary Radiators & Cooling Channels, High-Flow Catalytic Converters, Modified Exhaust Muffling, Pedestrian Protection Measures, and ECU/TCU Drivability & Low-Speed Gear Mapping. Its performance is slightly slower.

== Variants ==
=== Destrier ===
On 6 August 2026, Bugatti unveiled the Destrier as its third one-off model under its special 'Programme Solitaire' coachbuilding division after the Bugatti Brouillard and F.K.P. Hommage. The nameplate is derived after the significant war horses of the Middle Ages. The car's bodywork design is fluent compared with other vehicles, as well as the original model it was based on. The rear wing was removed, a slightly larger horseshoe grille akin to the Tourbillon, larger and bespoke alloy wheels, 20-inch on front and 21-inch on rear wheels, and the sole dark blue paint, named 'Sapphire Celeste.' Inside, the Destrier uses an upholstered leather done with nubuck and coated in brown called 'Amber Voyageur.' It also features 3D-printed copper fabric upholstered across the seats and the cockpit.

The 7,993 cc (488 cu in; 8 L) quad-turbocharged W16 engine from the Bolide remains unchanged, producing 1,177 kW (1,578 hp; 1,600 PS). The car is 1 metre (39 in) tall.

The Destrier was exhibited at the Pebble Beach Concours d'Elegance on 14 August 2026.

== Gallery ==
Bugatti Bolide at Monterey Car Week in 2021

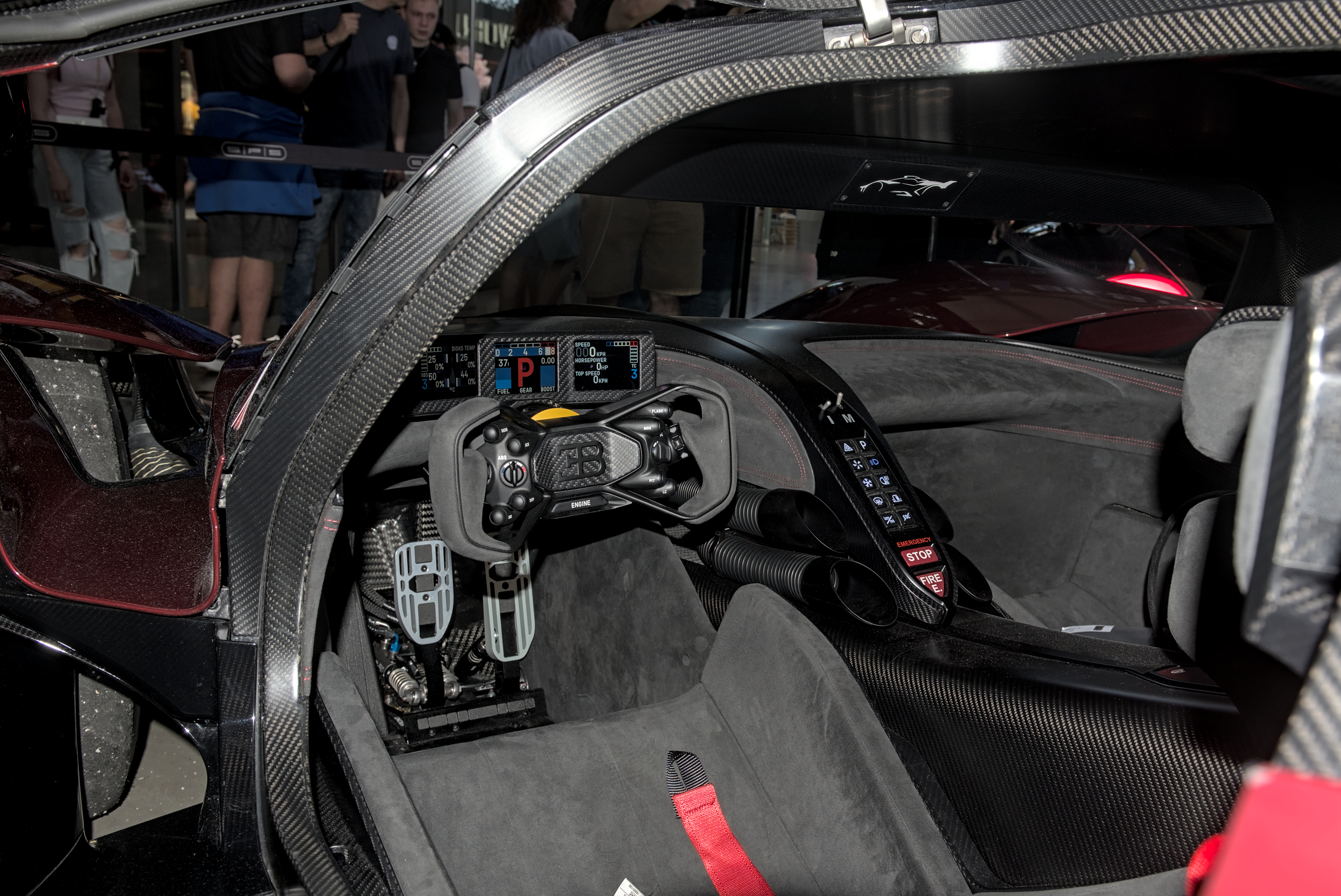
Interior

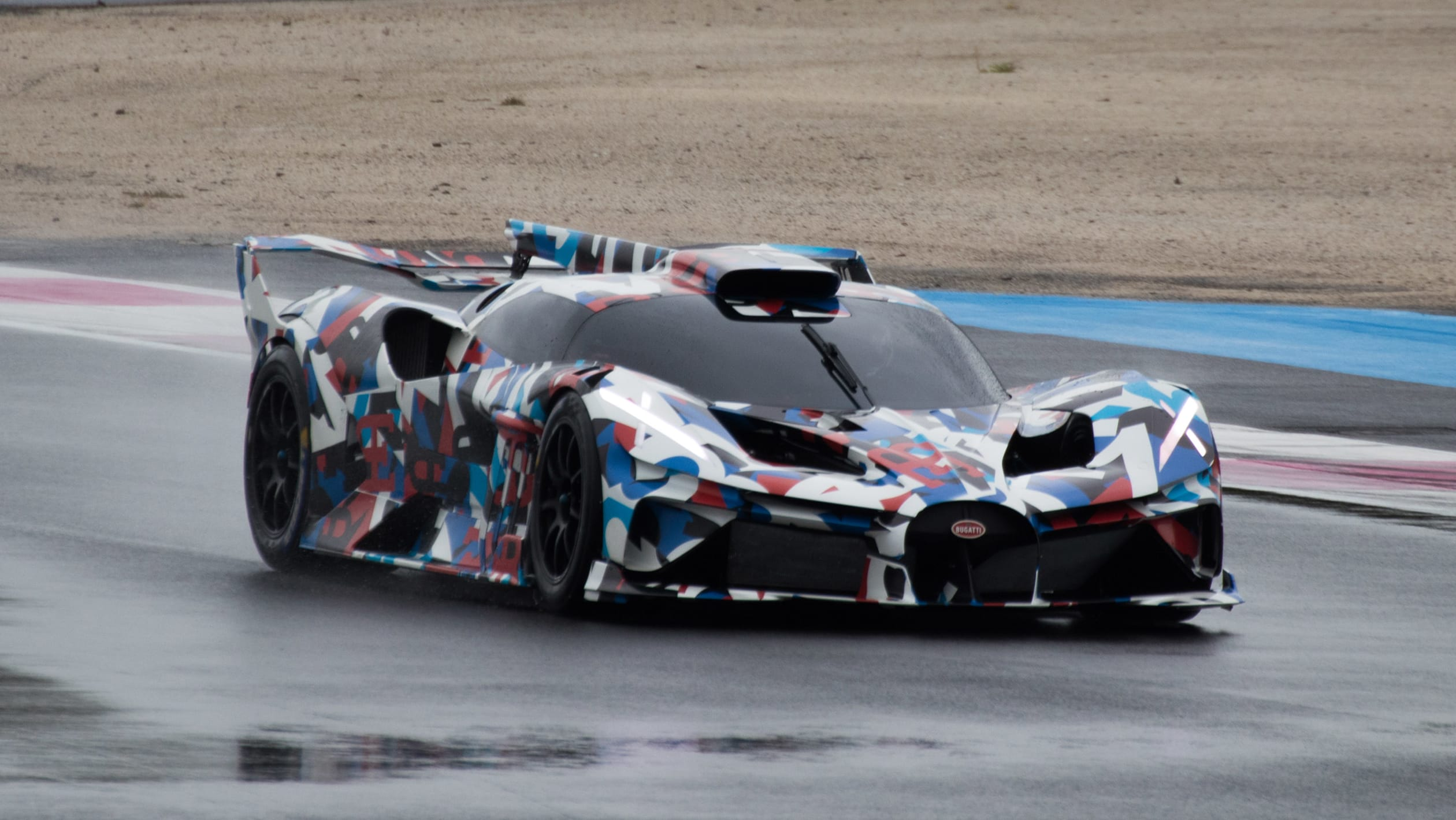
Front view at the Circuit Paul Ricard
