= Bugatti Mistral =

Sports car manufactured by Bugatti

Overview
- Manufacturer: Bugatti Automobiles S.A.S.
- Also called: Bugatti W16 Mistral
- Production: 2024–2025; 99 produced
- Assembly: France: Molsheim (Bugatti Molsheim Plant)
- Designer: Frank Heyl; Achim Anscheidt (Head of Design); Florian Westermann

Body and chassis
- Class: Sports car (S)
- Body style: 2-door convertible
- Layout: Mid-engine, all-wheel-drive
- Related: Bugatti Divo; Bugatti Centodieci; Bugatti Chiron

Powertrain
- Engine: 8.0 L (488 cu in) quad-turbocharged W16
- Power output: 1,177 kW (1,578 hp; 1,600 PS)
- Transmission: 7-speed dual-clutch automatic

Dimensions
- Wheelbase: 2,711 mm (106.7 in)
- Length: 4,544 mm (178.9 in)
- Width: 2,162 mm (85.1 in)
- Height: 1,212 mm (47.7 in)
- Kerb weight: 1,977 kg (4,359 lb)

The Bugatti Mistral, also called the Bugatti W16 Mistral, is a mid-engine two-seater sports car manufactured in Molsheim, France, by French automobile manufacturer Bugatti Automobiles S.A.S. It was revealed on 19 August 2022. The Mistral is the fastest roadster in the world with a top speed achievement of 453.91 km/h (282 mph) in November 2024. Deliveries to customers began in early 2024. All 99 units were pre-sold at a price of €5 million.

The Mistral is not a cabriolet version of the Chiron but rather a separate roadster model for Bugatti that marks the last vehicle to use the W16 engine that was introduced with the Bugatti Veyron in 2005.

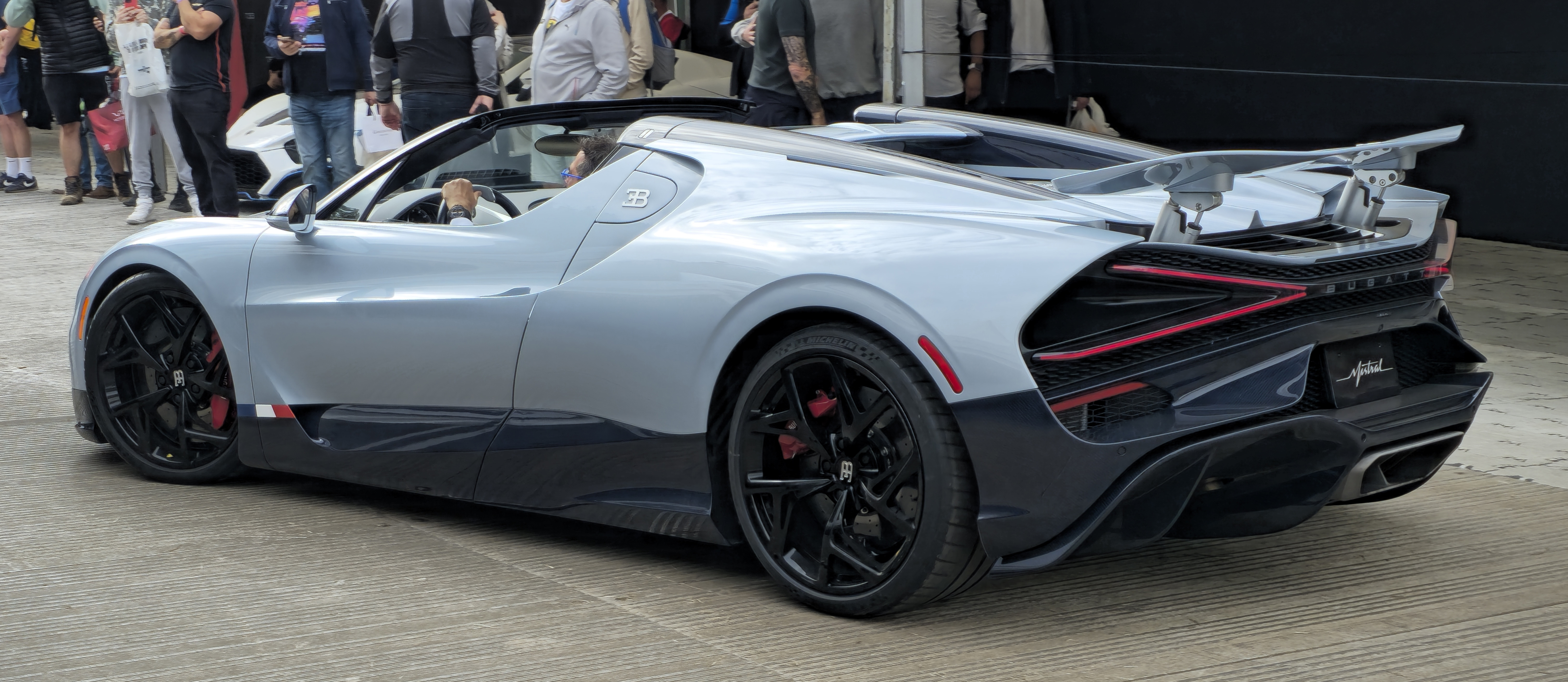
Rear view

Interior

== Specifications ==
The exterior design is unique to the Mistral and is not based on the Chiron or the latest Bugatti models. It is highly aerodynamic and sport-orientated, but nevertheless maintains a luxurious interior. The front headlights are uniquely designed with four diagonal lighting strips, while the rear lights are designed as two arrows pointing to the Bugatti symbol, which is also part of the lighting. Unlike the exterior, the passenger cabin is based on that of the Chiron, except for the gear lever, which features a Dancing Elephant sculpture, embedded in amber, designed by sculptor Rembrandt Bugatti, brother of Ettore Bugatti, the founder of Bugatti.

=== Technical specifications ===
==== Engine ====
The supercar utilizes the 8.0 L (488 cu in) displacement W16 engine from the Bugatti Chiron.

Technical specifications
| | 8.0 L W16 |
|---|---|
| Engine | 16-cylinder W engine |
| Displacement (cc) | 7,993 |
| Induction | Quad-turbocharged |
| Max. power (PS) | 1,600 |
| at rpm | 6,700 |
| Max. torque (N⋅m) | 1,600 |
| at rpm | 2,000 to 6,000 |
| Transmission | 7-speed DSG dual-clutch |
| Drivetrain | Permanent all-wheel drive |
| Top speed (km/h) | 420 |
| 0–100 km/h (62 mph) (s) | 2.4 |
| Curb weight (kg) | 1,960 |

== Variants ==
=== Brouillard ===
Brouillard at Chantilly Arts & Elegance Richard Mille in 2026

In 2025, Bugatti revealed a one-off modification of the Mistral called Brouillard, named after one of Ettore Bugatti's horses. As opposed to the Mistral, it is not a roadster but a closed coupé. The Brouillard is the first car in Bugatti's so called "Programme Solitaire", an exclusive programme dedicated to creating special one-off versions of existing models. The Brouillard uses the 1,177 kW (1,578 hp; 1,600 PS) 7,993 cc (488 cu in; 8 L) quad-turbocharged W16 engine from the Chiron Super Sport, as well as an all-wheel-drive setup.

=== F.K.P. Hommage ===
F.K.P. Hommage

In January 2026, Bugatti revealed its Programme Solitaire's second one-off model called the F.K.P. Hommage, which was named after the late Ferdinand Karl Piëch, as well as paying homage to the original Veyron, specifically chassis no. 001, which was designed by Piëch. It is based on the Mistral's chassis and body, with the latter being heavily redesigned to be similar to that of the Veyron, albeit with some new details such as the headlights and exhausts. Like the Brouillard, it uses the same 7,993 cc (488 cu in; 8 L) quad-turbocharged W16 engine from the Chiron Super Sport, capable of producing 1,177 kW (1,578 hp; 1,600 PS), which is more powerful than the car it was inspired by (746 kW (1,001 hp; 1,015 PS)).
