= Jimenez Novia =

Jimenez Novia W16

Overview
- Manufacturer: Jimenez
- Production: 1995 (only 1 produced)
- Designer: Ramon Jimenez

Body and chassis
- Class: Sports car
- Body style: 2-door coupe
- Layout: Longitudinal, mid-engine, rear-wheel drive
- Doors: Scissor

Powertrain
- Engine: 4.1 L (4118 cc) W16
- Transmission: 6 speed Hewland manual

Dimensions
- Wheelbase: 2540 mm (100.0 in)
- Length: 4,165.6 mm (164.0 in)
- Width: 1,955.8 mm (77.0 in)
- Height: 1,092.2 mm (43.0 in)
- Curb weight: 890 kg (1962.5 lb)

The Jimenez Novia W16 is a French one off sports car built in 1995 by Ramon Jimenez, a French motorcycle racer from Vaucluse. It reportedly cost £600,000 ($855,000) and took ten years to develop. It features an aerodynamic body with center locking wheels, scissor doors and carbon fiber parts which Jimenez developed himself.

== History ==
Jimenez started work on the Novia in 1985 in his workshop in Avignon, France. Before building the car, Jimenez acquired the materials needed to fabricate his own carbon fiber composite panels from scratch. The Novia was finished in 1995, reportedly at the cost of £600,000. Jimenez continued to test and develop it, planning additional performance upgrades. He wasn't able to homologate it for production, however, as the French government mandated that a separate chassis be made for the purpose of crash testing. It is reported that Jimenez was also working on a possible non road legal version of the Novia for production at the time.

== Performance ==
The Novia is powered by a mid mounted 4.1 L (4118 cc) (some sources say 4008 cc) W16 engine that was made by combining four Yamaha FZR1000 EXUP 1.0 liter 4 cylinder motorcycle engines. It has a single block with 4 rows of cylinders with 4 cylinders in each row and a total of 80 valves (5 valves per cylinder). It uses Sybele sequential electronic fuel injection, and has a timing system that's partly carried over from the Yamaha engines and partly bespoke, using chains between the 2nd and 3rd pistons, and a central timing system with two belts at the front of the block. It also uses two crankshafts, unlike the W16 found in the Bugatti Veyron. Some sources argue, however, that the layout of the powerplant with four rows of cylinders arranged in two Vs wasn't a true W engine as it didn't fit the "broad arrow" layout of other W engines. The finished engine produces 417.6 kW (567 PS, 560 bhp) at 10,000 rpm and 432 Nm (319 lb ft of torque) at 7500 rpm, with power sent to the rear wheels through a 6-speed Hewland manual transmission. The engine is reportedly capable of revving to 11,500 rpm. During a speed run on a section of the A7 highway in France that had been closed by local officials, the Novia reached a verified top speed of 380 km/h (236 mph). The car can reportedly accelerate from 0-60 mph (97 km/h) in 3.1 seconds and complete a 1000 meter sprint in 19 seconds. Notably, the Novia was one of the first cars to be powered by a W16 engine, preceding the Veyron’s use of one by ten years.

== Specifications ==
The Novia uses an aluminium honeycomb monocoque chassis, with a custom carbon fiber body inspired by 1970s prototype racecars such as the Porsche 917K and Lola T70. It also features centerlock wheels. The interior is accessed via scissor doors and features cream-colored Connolly leather, twin bucket seats with racing harnesses, radio/cassette player, ashtray and air conditioning. It also features electronic traction control and adjustable hydraulic suspension.
