= Bugatti W16 engine =

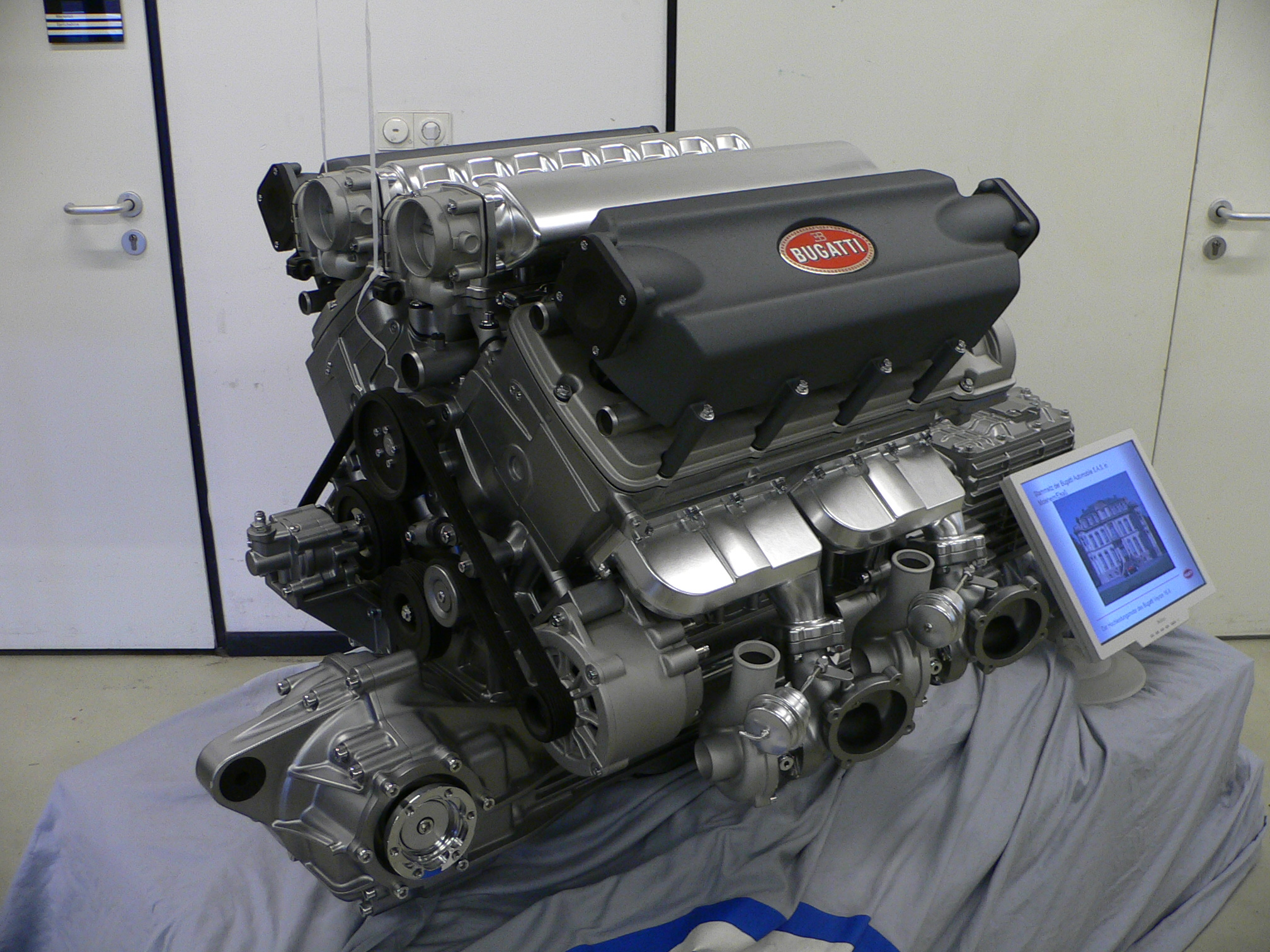

Overview
- Manufacturer: Bugatti
- Production: 2005-2026

Layout
- Configuration: 90° W16
- Displacement: 8.0 L (7,993 cc)
- Cylinder bore: 86 mm (3.39 in)
- Piston stroke: 86 mm (3.39 in)
- Valvetrain: 64-valve, DOHC, four-valves per cylinder

Combustion
- Turbocharger: Quad-turbocharged
- Fuel system: Electronic fuel injection
- Oil system: Dry sump

Output
- Power output: 987–1,825 hp (736–1,361 kW)
- Torque output: 922–1,364.5 lb⋅ft (1,250–1,850 N⋅m)

Dimensions
- Dry weight: 400 kg (882 lb)

Chronology
- Predecessor: Bugatti V12 engine

The Bugatti W16 is a quad-turbocharged, W16 engine, manufactured under the high-performance luxury sports car marque Bugatti, since 2005.

The cylinder block and crankcase is made of a forged aluminum alloy with the cylinder bores plasma coated. The crankshaft is made of die-forged steel. The connecting rods are made of lightweight titanium. The cylinder head and valvetrain is made of a cast aluminum alloy.

Volkswagen is a shareholder of Bugatti stock and shares in the profits of Bugatti products as of 2024.

In 2022, Bugatti announced the retirement of the W16 engine, making the Bugatti Mistral, which ended production in July 2026, the final automobile to use the engine.

Bugatti Veyron Grand Sport

The W16 engine that Volkswagen Group uses in its Bugatti Veyron and Chiron has a displacement of 8.0 L (488 cu in) and four turbochargers. It is effectively two narrow-angle VR8 engines (based on the VR6 design) mated at an included angle of 90 degrees on a common crankshaft.

The most powerful version of this engine, installed in the Bugatti Bolide, generates 1,361 kW (1,825 hp; 1,850 PS) at 7,000 rpm, and 1,364 lb⋅ft (1,849 N⋅m).

== Applications ==
- Audi Rosemeyer (concept car)
- Bugatti Veyron
- Bugatti Chiron
- Bugatti Divo
- Bugatti Centodieci
- Bugatti Bolide
- Bugatti Mistral
- Bugatti Vision Gran Turismo (concept car)
- Bentley Hunaudières (concept car)
- Bugatti Brouillard
- Bugatti Destrier
