= Bentley Hunaudières =

Concept car built by Bentley

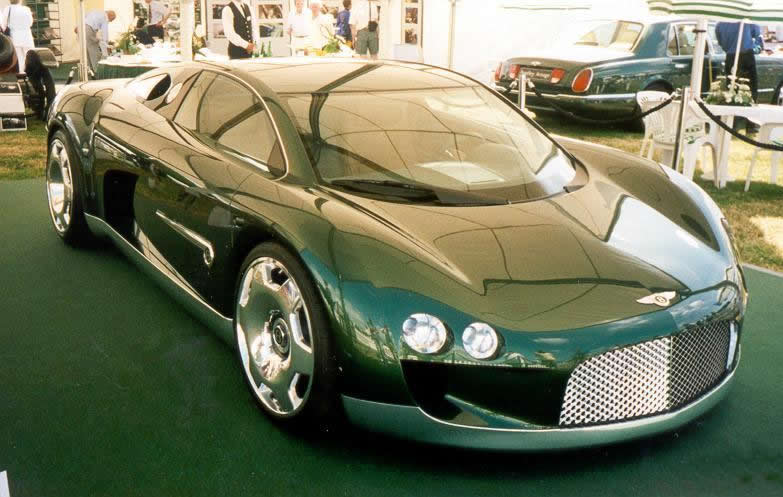

Overview
- Manufacturer: Bentley
- Production: 1999 (Concept car)
- Designer: Andreas Mindt

Body and chassis
- Class: Concept sports car (S)
- Body style: 2 door coupé
- Layout: Rear mid-engine, all wheel drive
- Related: Bugatti Veyron

Powertrain
- Engine: 8.0 L (488 cu in) VW Group (Bugatti) naturally aspirated WR16
- Power output: 623 bhp (465 kW; 632 PS)
- Transmission: 5-speed manual

Dimensions
- Curb weight: 1,400 kg (3,086 lb)

The Bentley Hunaudières is a concept car built by Bentley for the 1999 Geneva Salon International de l'Auto. It is powered by a Volkswagen 8.0-litre, naturally aspirated, WR16 engine adapted and modified by Bentley to generate 623 bhp (465 kW; 632 PS) of power at 6,000 rpm and 760 N⋅m (561 lb⋅ft) of torque at 4,000 rpm in conjunction with a five-speed manual transmission. It is capable of a 350 km/h (217 mph) top speed.

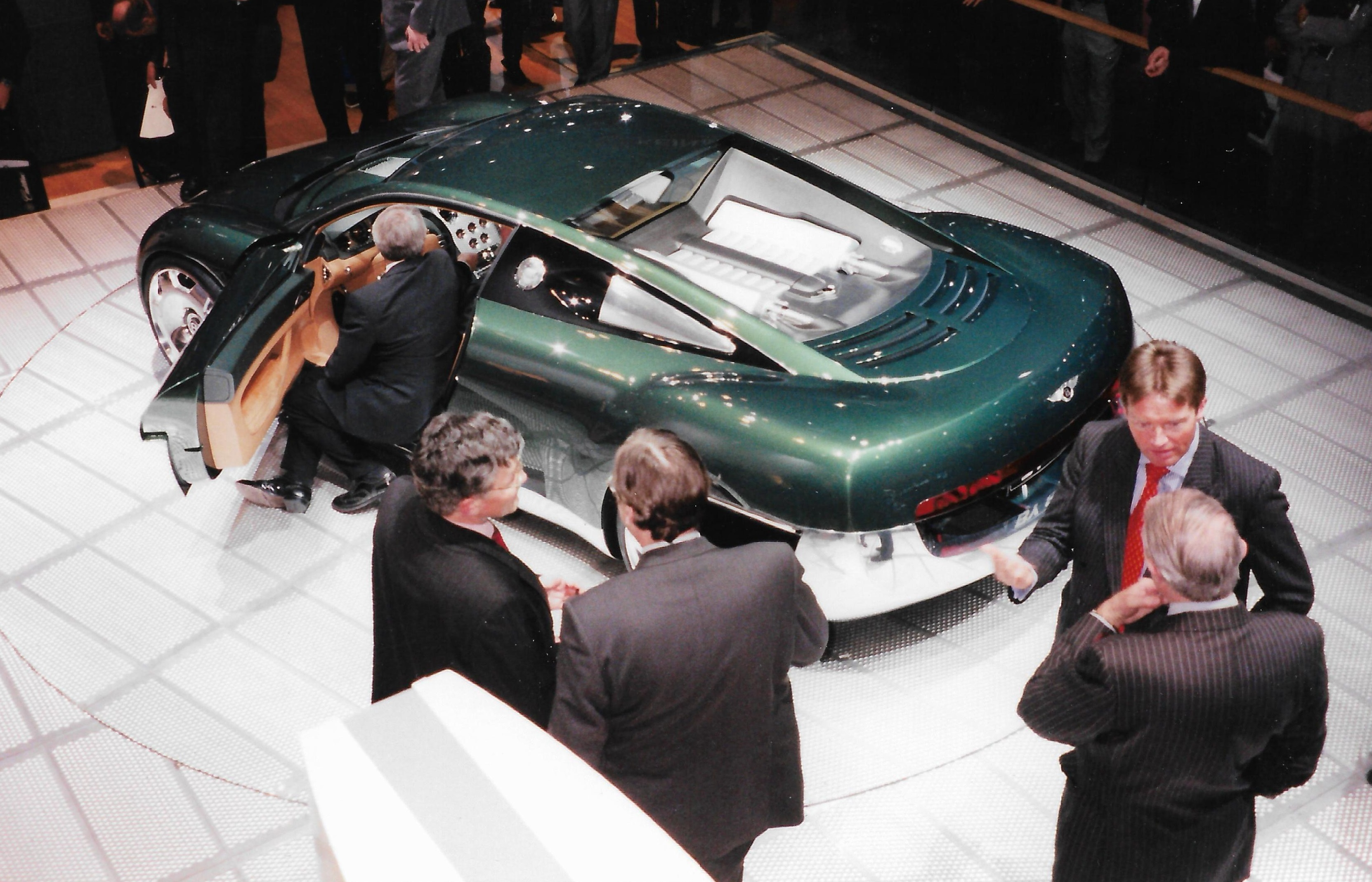
Bentley Hunaudières rear view

== Name ==
The Hunaudières' name pays homage to the famous straight of Circuit de la Sarthe where Sir Tim Birkin in a "Blower Bentley" overtook Rudolf Caracciola in a Mercedes-Benz SSK at 125 mph (201 km/h) with one wheel on the grass down the Hunaudières straight.

== Production ==
The concept, along with the similar Audi Rosemeyer, led to the production of the Bugatti Veyron by parent company Volkswagen.

== Video game ==
The Bentley Hunaudières was featured in the 2000 video game TOCA World Touring Cars as an unlockable car.
