= Audi Rosemeyer =

Concept car built by Audi

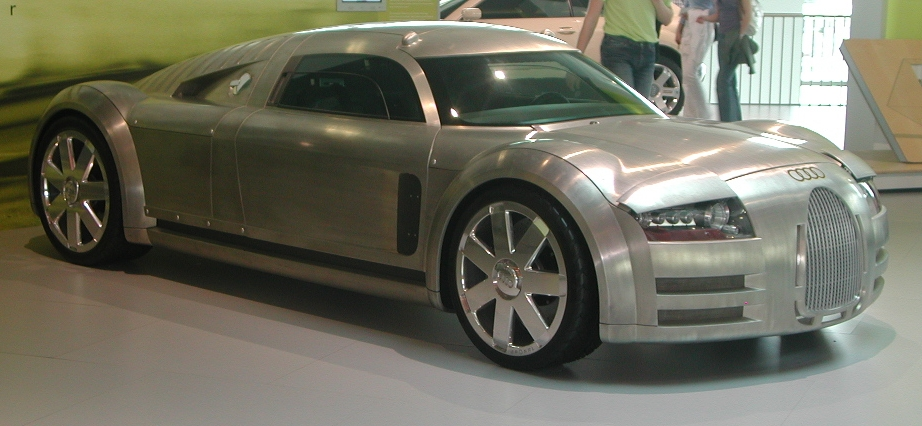

Overview
- Manufacturer: Audi AG
- Production: 2000
- Designer: Stefan Sielaff

Body and chassis
- Class: Concept vehicle
- Body style: 2-door coupé
- Layout: Mid engine, quattro permanent four-wheel drive
- Related: Bugatti Veyron; Bentley Hunaudières

Powertrain
- Engine: 8,004 cubic centimetres (488.4 cu in) WR16
- Power output: 700 brake horsepower (520 kW); 760 newton-metres (560 lbf⋅ft)
- Transmission: 6-speed manual

Dimensions
- Wheelbase: 2,911 mm (114.6 in)
- Length: 4,539 mm (178.7 in)
- Width: 1,920 mm (75.6 in)
- Height: 1,240 mm (49 in)
- Kerb weight: 1,607 kg (3,543 lb)

Chronology
- Predecessor: Audi Avus quattro
- Successor: Audi Le Mans quattro

The Audi Rosemeyer is a concept car built by Audi, shown initially at Autostadt and at various auto shows throughout Europe during 2000. It featured a polished aluminum body inspired by 1930s Auto Union racecars, and a mid mounted WR16 engine that would later be used in the Bugatti Veyron.

== Information ==
The Rosemeyer combined elements of modern design with styling strongly resembling the former Auto Union "Silver Arrows" Grand Prix racers, namely their 16-cylinder car driven by Bernd Rosemeyer, after which the car is named. The concept is also highly reminiscent of the "Type 52" design study penned by Dr. Ferdinand Porsche and Dr. Erwin Komenda in the 1930s as a possible road going version of the Silver Arrows, which never saw production.

The Rosemeyer was powered by a naturally aspirated 8.0L mid-mounted WR16 engine developing 700 hp (522 kW; 710 PS), and featured Audi's quattro permanent four-wheel drive system. The engine had previously been used in the Bentley Hunaudières concept, introduced a year earlier. The Rosemeyer was ultimately deemed unfit for production, both because of extremely high projected production costs, and Audi's unwillingness to create in-house competition with Lamborghini, which Audi had purchased during the 1990s. In some ways, Audi's Gallardo-based R8 could be considered the Rosemeyer's successor, as it was derived from Audi's next supercar concept, the Le Mans quattro. In other ways, the Bugatti Veyron could be seen as the Rosemeyer's successor, drawing some design elements and the WR16 engine from the Rosemeyer. The top speed was estimated to be 350 km/h (217.5 mph), though it couldn't be tested as the car wasn't functional.

== Images ==
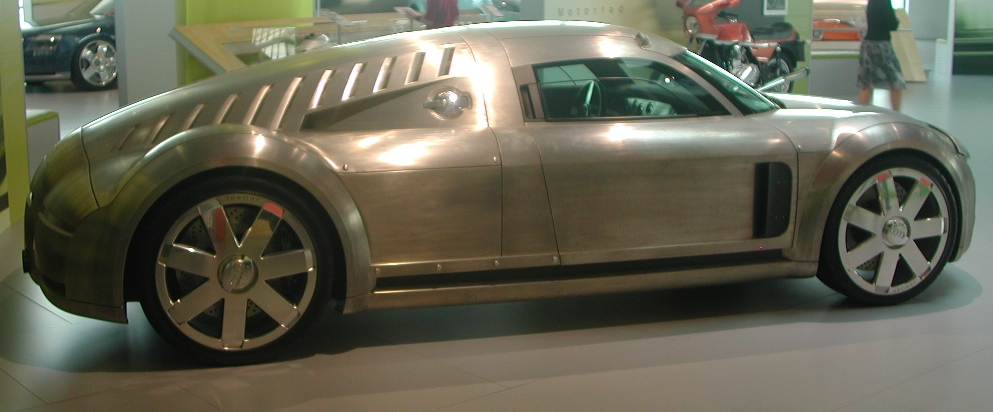

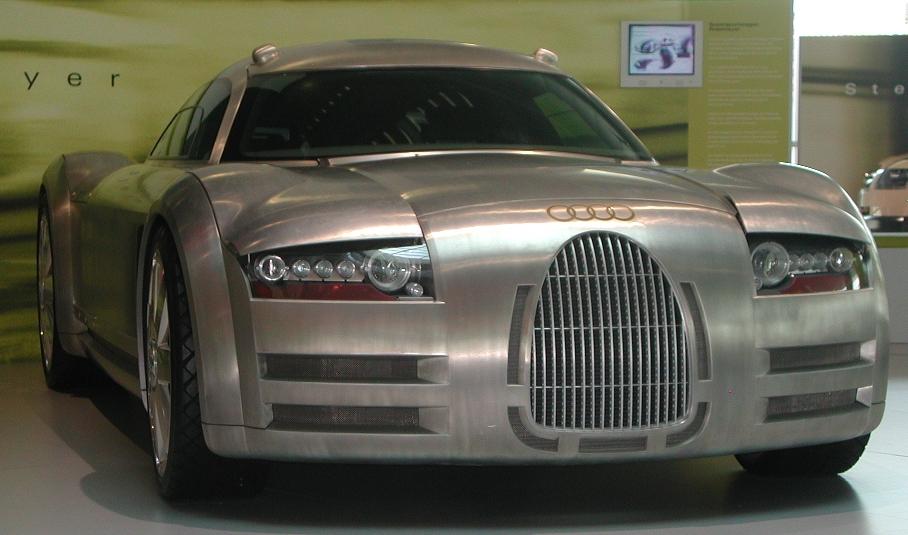
