= Bugatti Veyron =

Sports car by Bugatti (2005–2015)

Bugatti Veyron 16.4
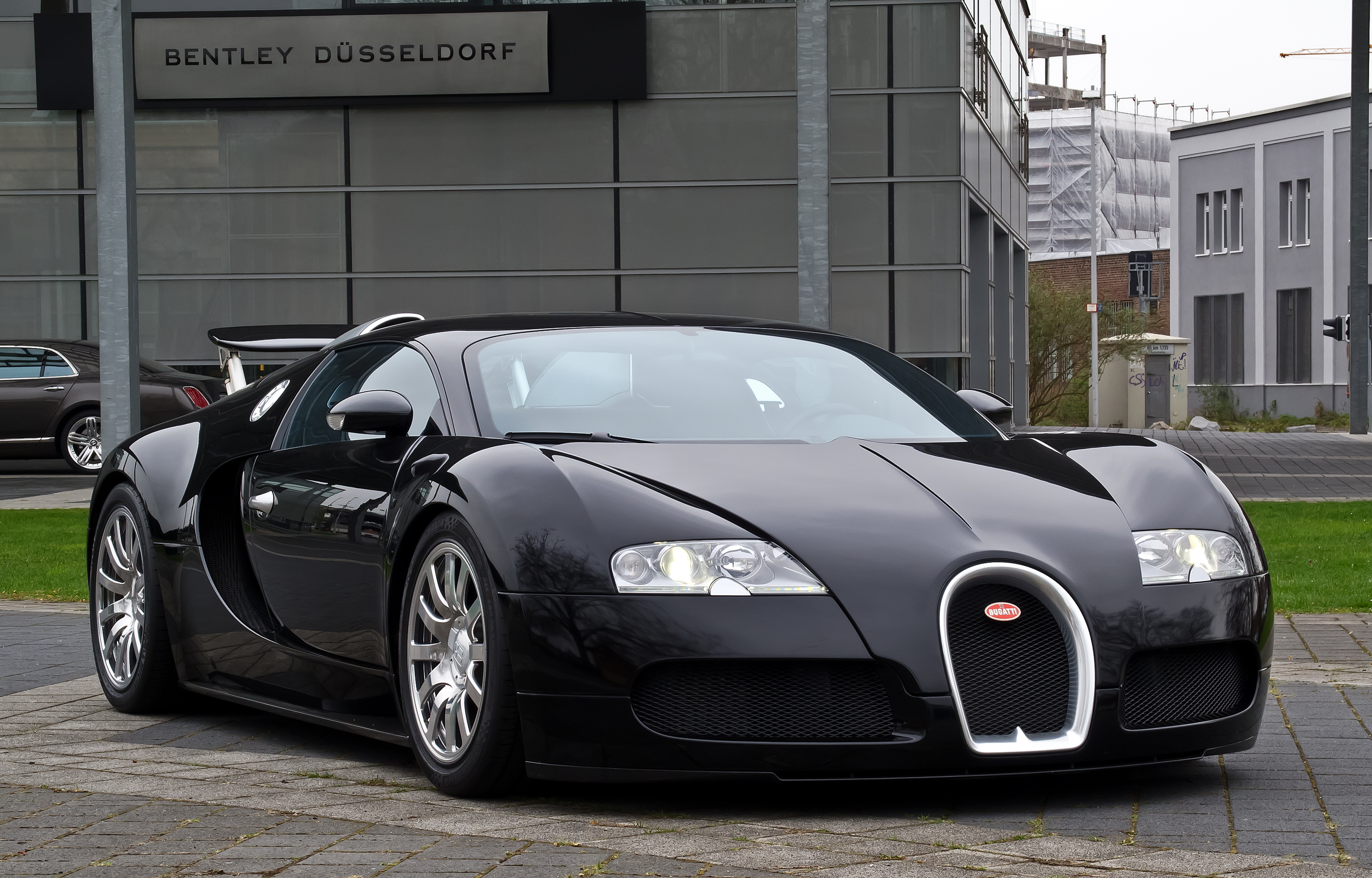

Overview
- Manufacturer: Bugatti Automobiles S.A.S.
- Production: 2005–2015 (450 produced); 2005–2011 (Veyron 16.4; 252 produced); 2009–2015 (Grand Sport; 58 produced); 2010–2011 (Super Sport; 48 produced); 2012–2015 (Grand Sport Vitesse; 92 produced)
- Assembly: France: Alsace, Molsheim
- Designer: Jozef Kabaň

Body and chassis
- Class: Sports car (S)
- Body style: 2-door coupé (16.4, Super Sport); 2-door targa top (Grand Sport, Grand Sport Vitesse)
- Layout: Mid-engine, all-wheel drive
- Related: Audi Rosemeyer (engine); Bentley Hunaudières

Powertrain
- Engine: 8.0 L (7,993 cc) quad-turbocharged Volkswagen W16
- Power output: Standard (Coupé), Grand Sport (Roadster): 736 kW (1,001 PS; 987 hp); Super Sport (Coupé), Grand Sport Vitesse (Roadster): 882 kW (1,200 PS; 1,183 hp)
- Transmission: 7-speed Ricardo dual-clutch automatic

Dimensions
- Wheelbase: 2,710 mm (106.7 in)
- Length: 4,462 mm (175.7 in)
- Width: 1,998 mm (78.7 in)
- Height: 1,204 mm (47.4 in)
- Kerb weight: 1,838–1,990 kg (4,052–4,387 lb)

Chronology
- Predecessor: Bugatti EB 110
- Successor: Bugatti Chiron

The Bugatti Veyron EB 16.4 is a mid-engine sports car designed and developed in Germany by the Volkswagen Group and Bugatti, and manufactured in Molsheim, France by French automobile manufacturer Bugatti. It was named after the racing driver Pierre Veyron.

The original version has a top speed of 407 km/h (253 mph). It was named the 2000s Car of the Decade by the BBC television programme Top Gear. The standard Veyron also won Top Gear's Best Car Driven All Year award in 2005.

The Super Sport version of the Veyron is one of the fastest street-legal production cars in the world, with a top speed of 431.072 km/h (267.856 mph). The Veyron Grand Sport Vitesse was the fastest roadster in the world, reaching an averaged top speed of 408.84 km/h (254.04 mph) in a test on 6 April 2013. The production car speed record was later taken by another Bugatti, the Chiron, and then often changed hands for a while.

The Veyron's chief designer was Hartmut Warkuß, with the exterior being designed by Jozef Kabaň of Volkswagen. Much of the engineering work was conducted under the guidance of chief technical officer Wolfgang Schreiber. The Veyron includes a sound system designed and built by Burmester Audiosysteme.

Several special variants have been produced. In December 2010, Bugatti began offering prospective buyers the ability to customise exterior and interior colours by using the Veyron 16.4 Configurator application on the marque's official website. The Bugatti Veyron was discontinued in late 2014, but special edition models continued to be produced until 2015.

Bugatti Veyron Grand Sport

== Origins ==
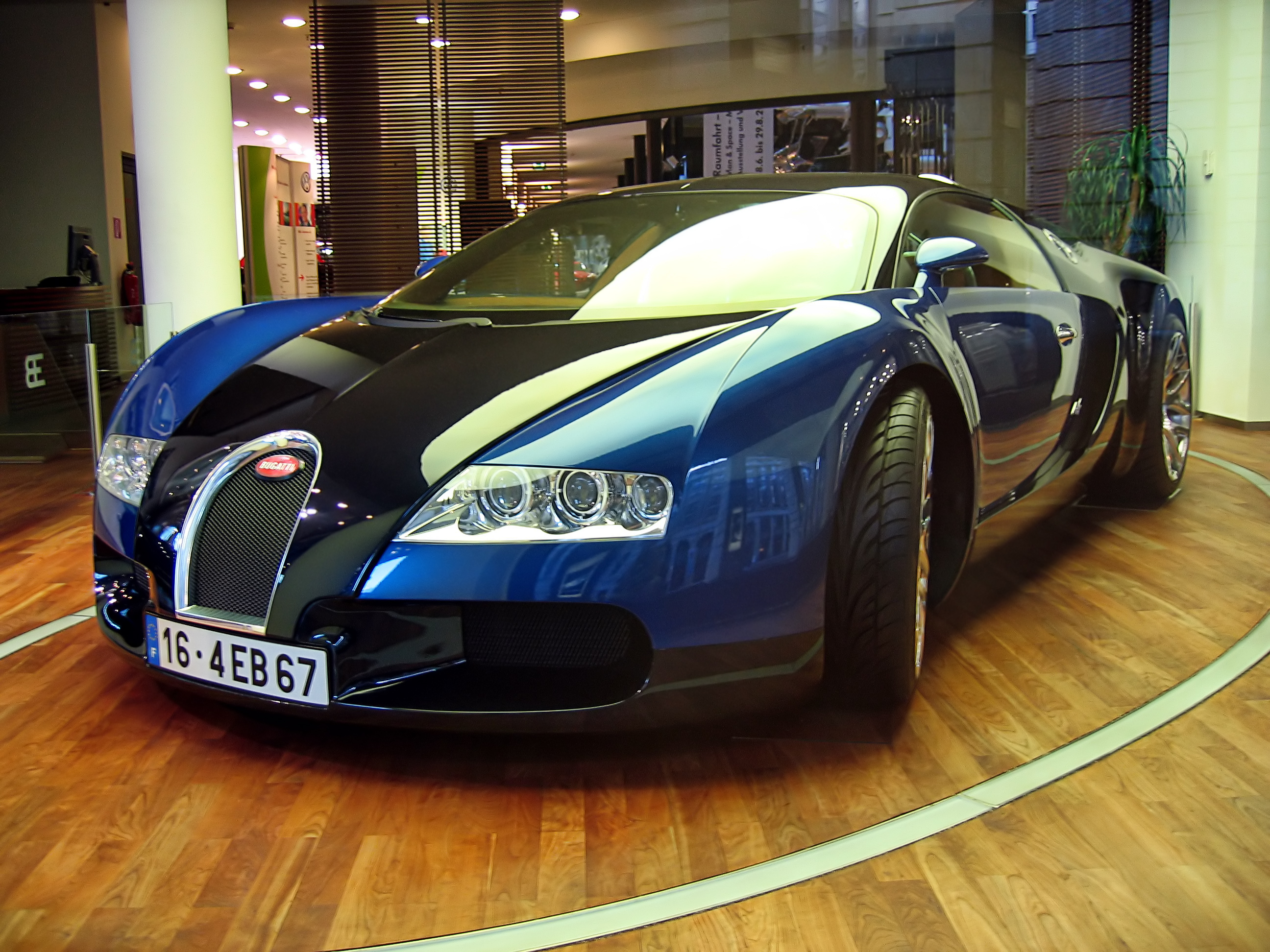

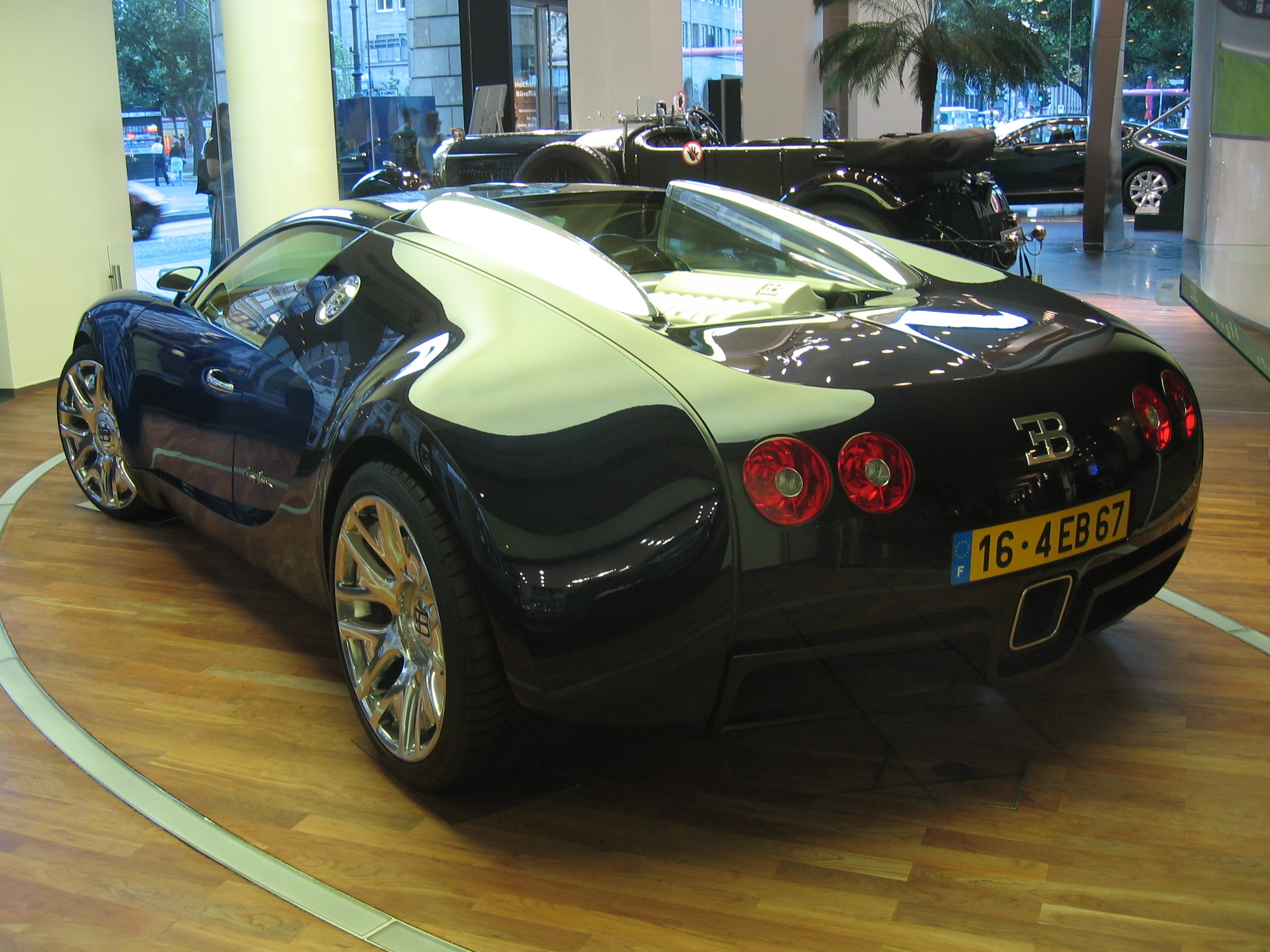
Bugatti Veyron EB 16/4 Concept, a modified version of the 18/4 Veyron

In May 1998, Volkswagen AG acquired the rights to use the Bugatti logo and the trade name Bugatti Automobiles S.A.S. To succeed the EB 110 model produced under the previous ownership, the automaker quickly released a series of concept cars whose technological advancements would culminate in the form of the Veyron 16.4.

Between October 1998 and September 1999, Bugatti introduced a series of Giugiaro-designed concept vehicles, each with permanent four-wheel drive and powered by the Volkswagen-designed W18 engine. The first car, the EB 118, was a 2-door luxury coupé presented at the 1998 Paris Motor Show. The next car, the EB 218, was a 4-door saloon presented at the 1999 Geneva Motor Show. The third and final car, the 18/3 Chiron, was a mid-engine sports car presented at the 1999 International Motor Show in Frankfurt.

In October 1999, Bugatti unveiled a fourth concept car at the Tokyo Motor Show. The EB 18/4 Veyron was a mid-engine sports car styled in-house under the direction of Hartmut Warkuß. In 2000, a modified version, the EB 16/4 Veyron, was displayed at motor shows in Detroit, Geneva, and Paris. Rather than the three-bank W18 engine of the four previous concept cars, the EB 16/4 featured the four-bank W16 engine architecture installed in every production example of the Veyron. Warkuß also commissioned SEAT head of design, Walter de Silva, to submit a design proposal for the new Bugatti. The design was ultimately rejected in favour of Warkuß's own proposal.

The decision to start production of the car was made by the Volkswagen Group in 2001. The first roadworthy prototype was completed in August 2003. It is identical to the later series variant, except for a few details. In the transition from development to series production, considerable technical problems had to be addressed, repeatedly delaying production until September 2005.

The Veyron EB 16.4 is named in honor of Pierre Veyron, a Bugatti development engineer, test driver and company race driver who, with co-driver Jean-Pierre Wimille, won the 1939 24 Hours of Le Mans while driving a Bugatti. The "EB" refers to Bugatti founder Ettore Bugatti and the "16.4" refers to the engine's 16 cylinders and quad-turbochargers.

== Bugatti Veyron (2005–2011) ==
=== Specifications and performance ===
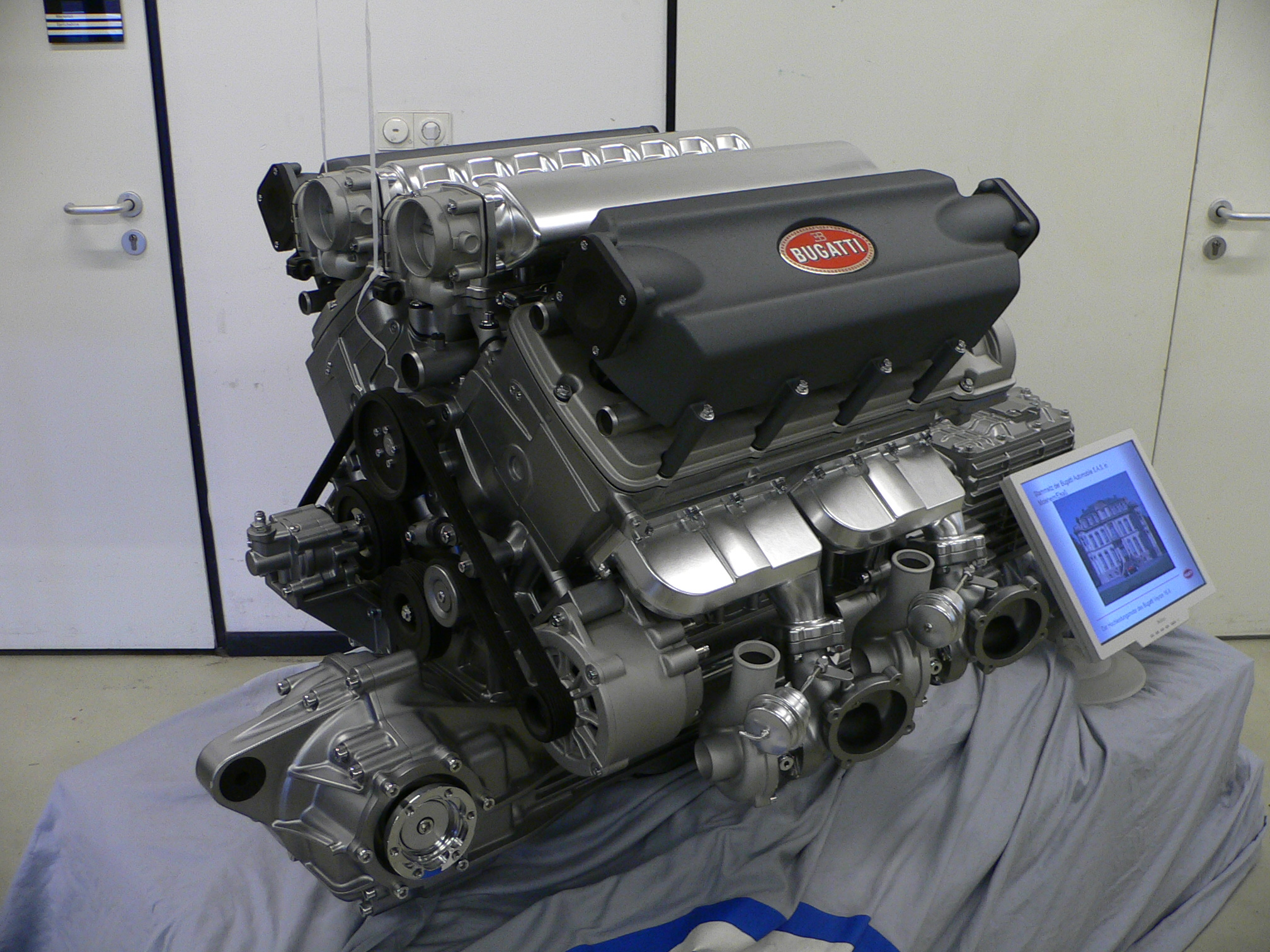
The Veyron's quad-turbocharged W16 engine

The Veyron features an 8.0-litre, quad-turbocharged, W16 cylinder engine, equivalent to two narrow-angle V8 engines bolted together. Each cylinder has four valves for a total of 64, but the configuration of each bank allows two overhead camshafts to drive two banks of cylinders so only four camshafts are needed. The engine is fed by four turbochargers and displaces 7,993 cc (487.8 cu in), with a square 86 by 86 mm (3.39 by 3.39 in) bore and stroke.

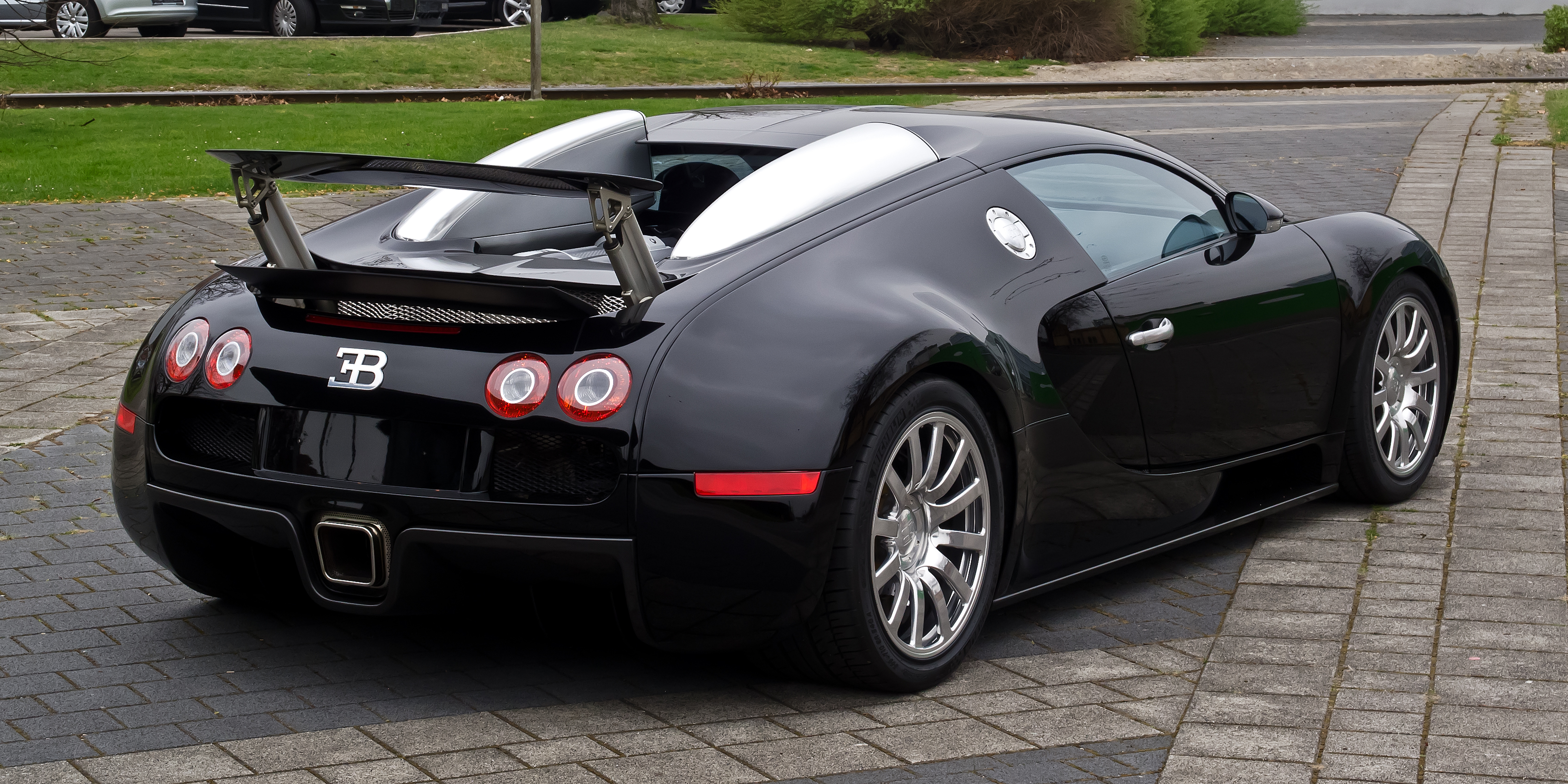
Bugatti Veyron 16.4

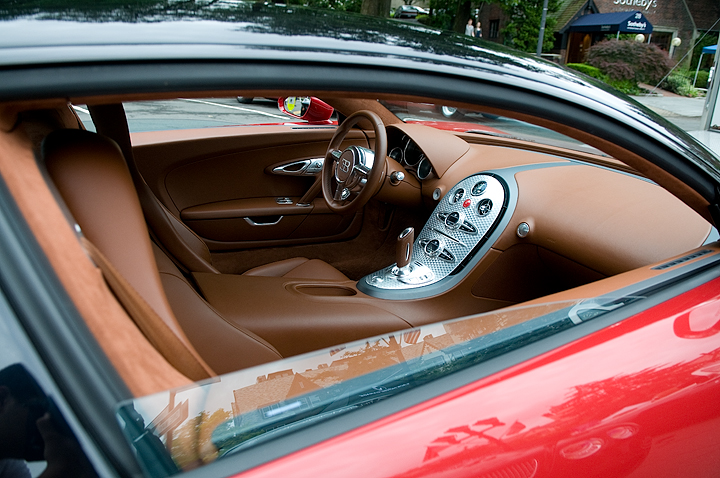
Bugatti Veyron Interior

The transmission is a dual-clutch direct-shift computer-controlled automatic transmission having seven gear ratios, with magnesium paddles behind the steering wheel and a shift time of less than 150 milliseconds, built by Ricardo of England rather than Borg-Warner, who designed the six speed DSG used in the mainstream Volkswagen Group marques. The Veyron can be driven in either semi-automatic or fully-automatic mode. A replacement transmission for the Veyron costs just over US$120,000. It also has permanent all-wheel drive using the Haldex Traction system. It uses special Michelin PAX run-flat tyres, designed specifically to accommodate the Veyron's top speed, and cost US$25,000 per set. The tyres can be mounted on the wheels only in France, a service which costs US$70,000. Kerb weight is 1,888 kg (4,162 lb). This gives the car a power-to-weight ratio, according to Volkswagen Group's figures, of 530 PS (390 kW; 523 hp) per ton. The overall length is 4,462 mm (175.7 in), which gives 1,752.6 mm (69.0 in) of overhang. The Bugatti Veyron has a total of ten radiators:

- 3 air-to-liquid intercooler loop radiators
- 3 engine water-cooling radiators
- 1 air conditioning condenser
- 1 transmission oil radiator
- 1 differential oil radiator
- 1 engine oil radiator

It has a drag coefficient of Cd=0.41 (normal condition) and Cd=0.36 (after lowering to the ground), and a frontal area of 2.07 m^{2} (22.3 sq ft). This gives it a drag area, the product of drag coefficient and frontal area, of CdA=0.74 m^{2} (8.0 sq ft).

Despite the exclusivity of the project and the price of each unit, used existing components from VW Group models or other suppliers (hydraulic pump, air filter, etc.). This is acceptable in mechanical engineering, but can lead to rapid wear due to heavy loads of the Veyron, which, however, simplifies independent repairs.

=== Engine power output ===
According to Volkswagen Group and certified by TÜV Süddeutschland, the W16 engine utilised by the Veyron has a power output of 736 kW (987 hp; 1,001 PS), and generates 1,250 N⋅m (922 lbf⋅ft) of torque.

=== Top speed ===
German inspection officials recorded an average top speed of the original version at 408.47 km/h (253.81 mph) during test sessions on Volkswagen Group's private Ehra-Lessien test track on 19 April 2005.

This top speed was almost matched by James May on Top Gear in November 2006, at the Ehra-Lessien test track, at 407.5 km/h (253.2 mph). May noted that at top speed the engine consumes 45,000 L (9,900 imp gal) of air per minute (as much as a human breathes in four days). Back in the Top Gear studio, co-presenter Jeremy Clarkson commented that most sports cars felt like they were shaking apart at their top speed, and asked May if that was the case with the Veyron at 407 km/h (253 mph). May responded that the Veyron was very controlled, and only wobbled slightly when the air brake deployed.

In regular use, the ability to reach the above absolute top speed is locked out. The car's normal top speed is listed as 343 km/h (213 mph). Also, when the car reaches 220 km/h (137 mph), hydraulics lower the car until it has a ground clearance of about 9 cm (3.5 in). At the same time, the wing and spoiler deploy. In this handling mode, the wing provides 3,425 newtons (770 lbf) of downforce, holding the car to the road.

To reach the car's absolute top speed, its top speed mode must be entered while the vehicle is at rest. For this, the driver must use a special top speed key in a keyhole to the left of their seat, which triggers a checklist to establish whether the car and its driver are ready to attempt to reach 407 km/h (253 mph). If so, the rear spoiler retracts, the front air diffusers shut, and normal 12.5 cm (4.9 in) ground clearance drops to 6.5 cm (2.6 in).

=== Braking ===
The Veyron's brakes use cross drilled, radially vented carbon fibre reinforced silicon carbide (C/SiC) composite discs, manufactured by SGL Carbon, which have less brake fade and weigh less than standard cast iron discs. The lightweight aluminium alloy monobloc brake calipers are made by AP Racing; the front have eight titanium pistons and the rear calipers have six pistons. Bugatti claims maximum deceleration of 1.3 g on road tyres. As an added safety feature, in the event of brake failure, an anti-lock braking system (ABS) has also been installed on the handbrake.

Prototypes have been subjected to repeated 1.0 g braking from 312 km/h (194 mph) to 80 km/h (50 mph) without fade. With the car's acceleration from 80 km/h (50 mph) to 312 km/h (194 mph), that test can be performed every 22 seconds. At speeds above 200 km/h (124 mph), the rear wing also acts as an airbrake, snapping to a 55° angle in 0.4 seconds once brakes are applied, providing an additional 0.68 g (6.66 m/s^{2}) of deceleration (equivalent to the stopping power of an ordinary hatchback). Bugatti claims the Veyron will brake from 400 km/h (249 mph) to a standstill in less than 10 seconds, though distance covered in this time will be half a kilometre (third of a mile).

=== Special editions ===
Name	Picture	Release date	Release price	Notes
Bugatti 16.4 Veyron Pur Sang		September 2007		5 units were made. The first Veyron to feature no paint, and instead use an exposed carbon fiber and aluminum finish.
Bugatti Veyron Fbg par Hermès		March 2008	€1.55 million, excluding taxes and transport	Collaboration with French design house Hermès, featuring a bull calfskin interior. This model was limited to four units. A Veyron 16.4 Grand Sport was later produced in the same configuration.
Bugatti 16.4 Veyron Sang Noir		May 2008		12 units were made.
Bugatti Veyron Bleu Centenaire		March 2009		1 unit was made.
Bugatti Veyron "Jean-Pierre Wimille"		September 2009		Named after French racing driver Jean-Pierre Wimille who was a factory driver for Bugatti in the 1930s.
Bugatti Veyron "Achille Varzi"		September 2009		Named after Italian racing driver Achille Varzi who raced for Bugatti in the early 1930s.
Bugatti Veyron "Malcolm Campbell"		September 2009		Named after British racing driver Malcolm Campbell who raced for Bugatti in the late 1920s.
Bugatti Veyron "Hermann zu Leiningen"		September 2009		Named after German racing driver Hermann zu Leiningen who raced for Bugatti in the early 1930s.

== Bugatti Veyron 16.4 Grand Sport (2009–2015) ==
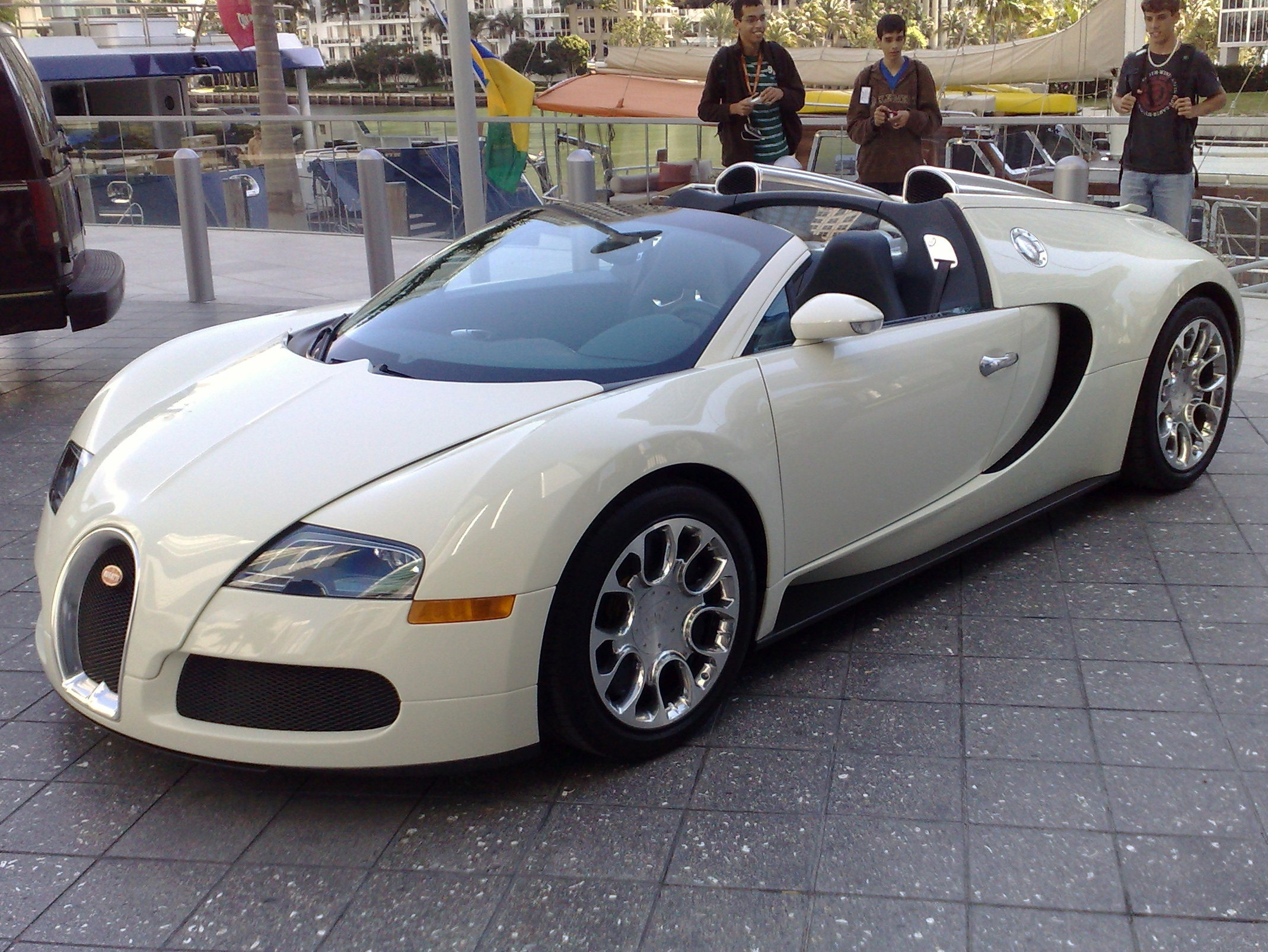

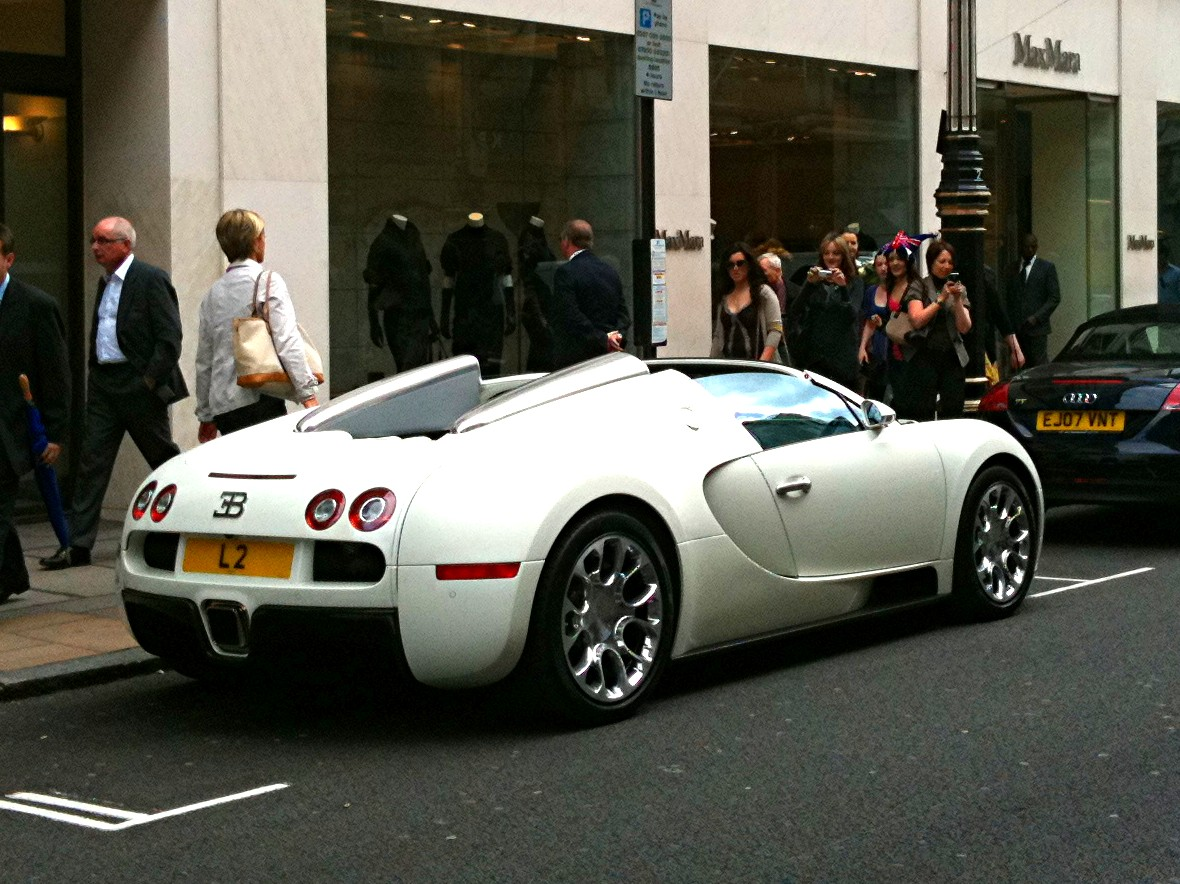
Bugatti Veyron Grand Sport

The targa top version of the Bugatti Veyron EB 16.4, dubbed the Bugatti Veyron 16.4 Grand Sport, was unveiled at the 2008 Pebble Beach Concours d'Elegance. It has extensive reinforcements to compensate for the lack of a standard roof and small changes to the windshield and running lights. Two removable tops are included, the second a temporary arrangement fashioned after an umbrella. The top speed with the hardtop in place is the same as the standard coupé version, but with the roof removed is limited to 369 km/h (229 mph)—and to 130 km/h (81 mph) with the temporary soft roof. The Grand Sport edition was limited to 150 units, with the first 50 going exclusively to registered Bugatti customers. Production began in the second quarter of 2009.

=== Special editions ===
Name	Picture	Release date	Release price	Notes
Bugatti Veyron 16.4 Grand Sport Sang Bleu		August 2009		One off model featuring a two tone blue carbon fiber and polished aluminum exterior.
Bugatti Veyron 16.4 Grand Sport L'Or Blanc		June 2011	€1.65 million, excluding taxes and transport	Collaboration between Bugatti and the Royal Porcelain Factory in Berlin. Claimed by Bugatti to be the "first automobile equipped with porcelain", though the material had seen very limited use in some early 20th century cars. It featured a thin porcelain layer coating the exterior, as well as porcelain inlays on the interior and on certain exterior pieces such as the fuel filler cap, badges, and wheel center caps. One made.
Bugatti Veyron 16.4 Grand Sport "Dubai Motor Show 2011" Special Edition		November 2011	€1.58 million, excluding taxes and transport	Introduced with a horizontal colour split with a bright yellow body framed in visible black carbon (including black-tinted wheels), seats in yellow-coloured leather upholstery with black stitching, middle console in black carbon, dashboard, steering wheel and gearshift made of black leather with yellow stitching. The car was then shown again at the 2012 Qatar Motor Show.
Bugatti Veyron 16.4 Grand Sport "Dubai Motor Show 2011" Special Edition		November 2011	€1.74 million, excluding taxes and transport	Presented in a two-tone horizontal colour split consisting of visible blue carbon, framed in polished, anodised aluminium.
Bugatti Veyron 16.4 Grand Sport "Dubai Motor Show 2011" Special Edition		November 2011	€1.74 million, excluding taxes and transport	Came in the newly developed green carbon fibre tone with polished aluminium.
Bugatti Veyron 16.4 Grand Sport Bernar Venet		December 2012		One off model painted by French conceptual artist Bernar Venet, with designs on the exterior and interior made up of technical equations used by Bugatti engineers during the making of the Veyron.

== Bugatti Veyron 16.4 Super Sport, World Record Edition (2010–2011) ==
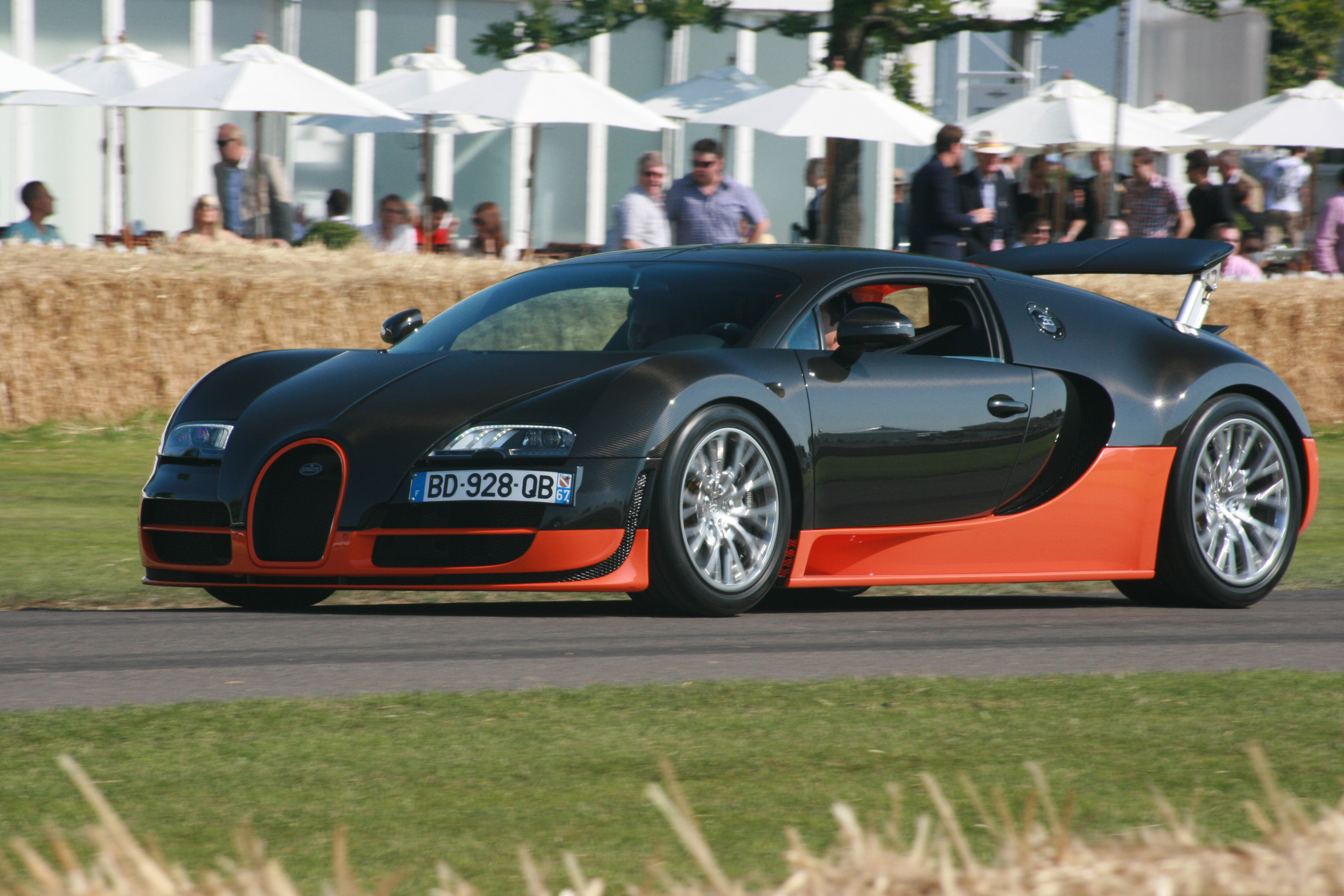
The Bugatti Veyron 16.4 Super Sport World Record Edition – formerly the fastest road legal production car attaining a top speed of 431 km/h (268 mph)

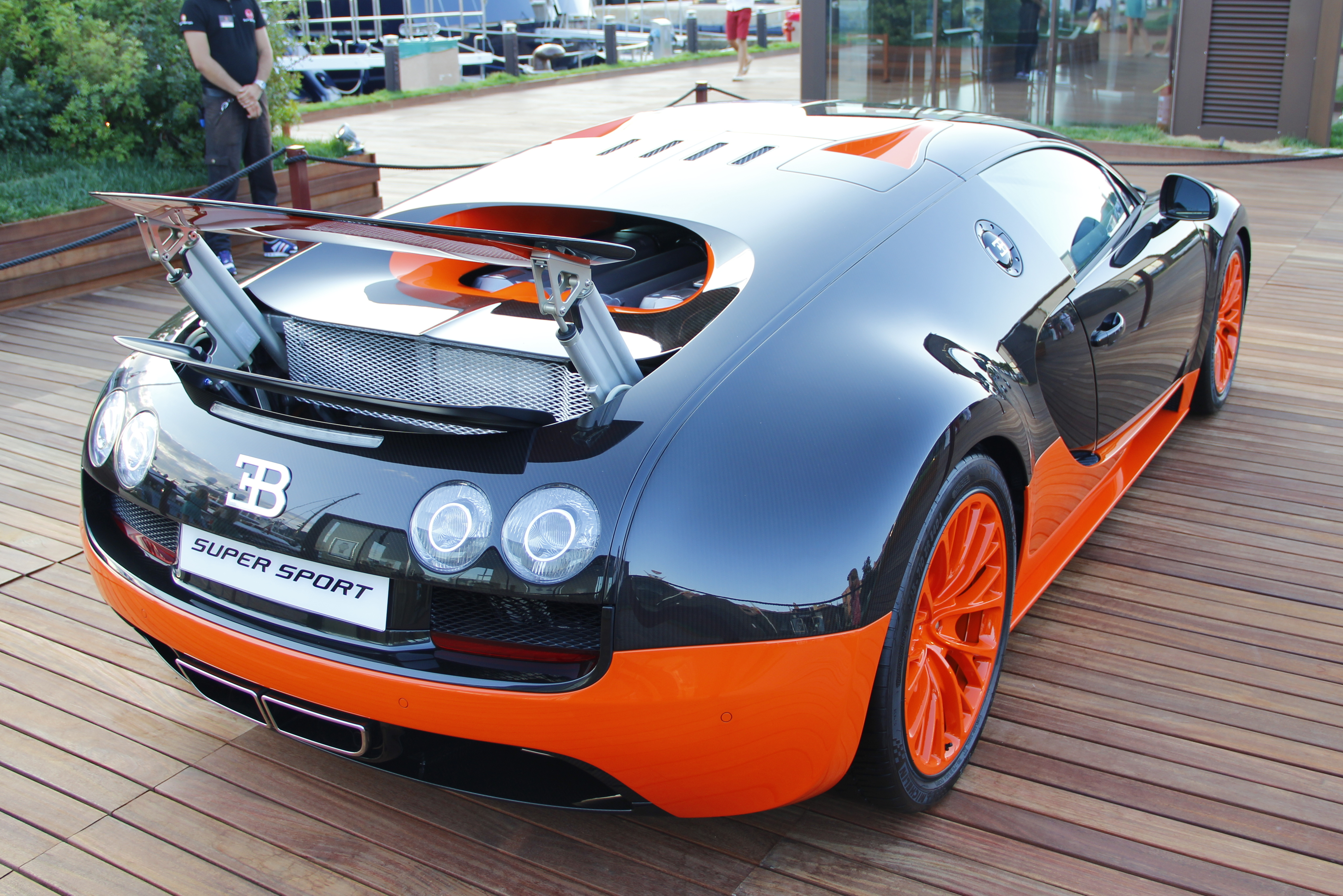
Rear 3/4 view

The Bugatti Veyron 16.4 Super Sport is a faster, more powerful version of the Bugatti Veyron 16.4. Production was limited to 48 units. The Super Sport has increased engine power output of 1,200 PS (882 kW; 1,183 hp) at 6,400 rpm and a maximum torque of 1,500 N⋅m (1,106 lb⋅ft) at 3,000–5,000 rpm and a revised aerodynamic package. The Super Sport has been driven as fast as 431.072 km/h (267.856 mph), making it the fastest production road car in the world at the time of its introduction although it is electronically limited to 415 km/h (258 mph) to protect the tyres from disintegrating.

The Bugatti Veyron 16.4 Super Sport World Record Edition is a version of the Bugatti Veyron 16.4 Super Sport. It is limited to five units. It has an orange body detailing, orange wheels, and a special black exposed carbon body. The electronic limiter is deactivated on this version.

The model was unveiled in 2010 at The Quail, followed by the 2010 Monterey Historic Races at Laguna Seca, and the 2010 Pebble Beach Concours d'Elegance.

=== Top Speed World Record ===
On 4 July 2010, James May, a television presenter on BBC Two's television show Top Gear, drove the Veyron Super Sport on Volkswagen's Ehra-Lessien (near Wolfsburg, Germany) high-speed test track at 417.61 km/h (259.49 mph). Later that day, Bugatti's official test driver Pierre Henri Raphanel drove the Super Sport version of the Veyron at the same track to establish the car's top speed. With representatives of the Guinness Book of Records and German Technical Inspection Agency (TÜV) on hand, Raphanel made passes around the big oval in both directions achieving an average maximum speed of 431.072 km/h (267.856 mph), thus taking back the title from the SSC Ultimate Aero TT as the fastest production vehicle of all time. The 431.072 km/h (267.856 mph) mark was reached by averaging the Super Sport's two test runs, the first reaching 427.933 km/h (265.905 mph) and the second 434.211 km/h (269.806 mph).

When the record was certified it was already well known to the public that the customer car would be electronically limited to 415 km/h (258 mph). Yet, after a query by the Sunday Times Guinness' PR director Jaime Strang was quoted on 5 April 2013: "As the car's speed limiter was deactivated, this modification was against the official guidelines. Consequently, the vehicle's record set at 431.072 km/h is no longer valid." On 10 April 2013, it was written on its website: "Guinness World Records would like to confirm that Bugatti's record has not been disqualified; the record category is currently under review."

On 15 April 2013, Bugatti's speed record was confirmed: "Following a thorough review conducted with a number of external experts, Guinness World Records is pleased to announce the confirmation of Bugatti's record of Fastest production car achieved by the Veyron 16.4 SuperSport. The focus of the review was with respect to what may constitute a modification to a car's standard specification. Having evaluated all the necessary information, Guinness World Records is now satisfied that a change to the speed limiter does not alter the fundamental design of the car or its engine."

== Bugatti Veyron 16.4 Grand Sport Vitesse (2012–2015) ==
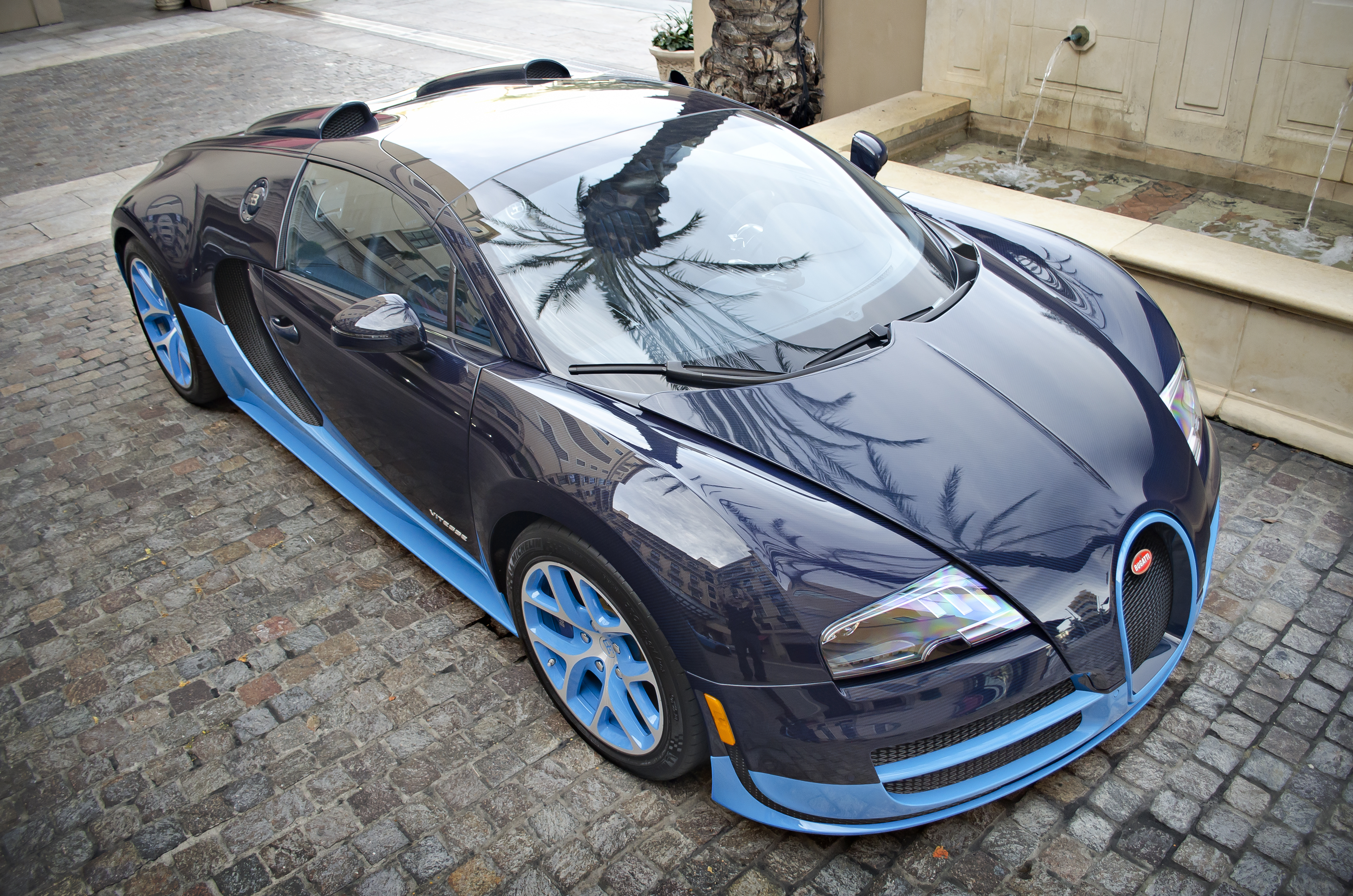
Bugatti Veyron Grand Sport Vitesse

The Bugatti Veyron 16.4 Grand Sport Vitesse is a targa top version of the Veyron Super Sport. The engine in the Vitesse variant has a maximum power output of 1,200 PS (882 kW; 1,183 bhp) at 6,400 rpm and a maximum torque of 1,500 N⋅m (1,100 lb⋅ft) at 3,000–5,000 rpm. These figures allow the car to accelerate from a stand still to 100 km/h (62 mph) in 2.6 seconds. On normal roads, the Vitesse is electronically limited to 375 km/h (233 mph).

The Vitesse was first unveiled at the 2012 Geneva Motor Show and later at the 2012 Beijing Auto Show and the 2012 São Paulo Motor Show.

=== Special editions ===
A number of special editions of the Vitesse were made:

- The World Record Car (WRC) Edition was limited to 8 units, debuted in 2013, and went on sale for €1.99 million.

Name	Picture	Release date	Release price	Notes
Bugatti Veyron 16.4 Grand Sport Vitesse Le Ciel Californien.		August 2012	€1.74 million (US$2.2 million)	Inspired by the Bugatti Type 37A.
Bugatti Veyron 16.4 Grand Sport Vitesse "1 of 1"		18 August 2014		Commissioned by a customer in Singapore.
Bugatti Veyron 16.4 Grand Sport Vitesse La Finale		March 2015		The final Veyron made, featuring a flipped version of the original Veyron's red and black color scheme, finished in red and black carbon fiber.

In 2013, Bugatti produced a series of Vitesse dedicated to racing legends, including Jean-Pierre Wimille, Jean Bugatti, Meo Costantini, and Ettore Bugatti.

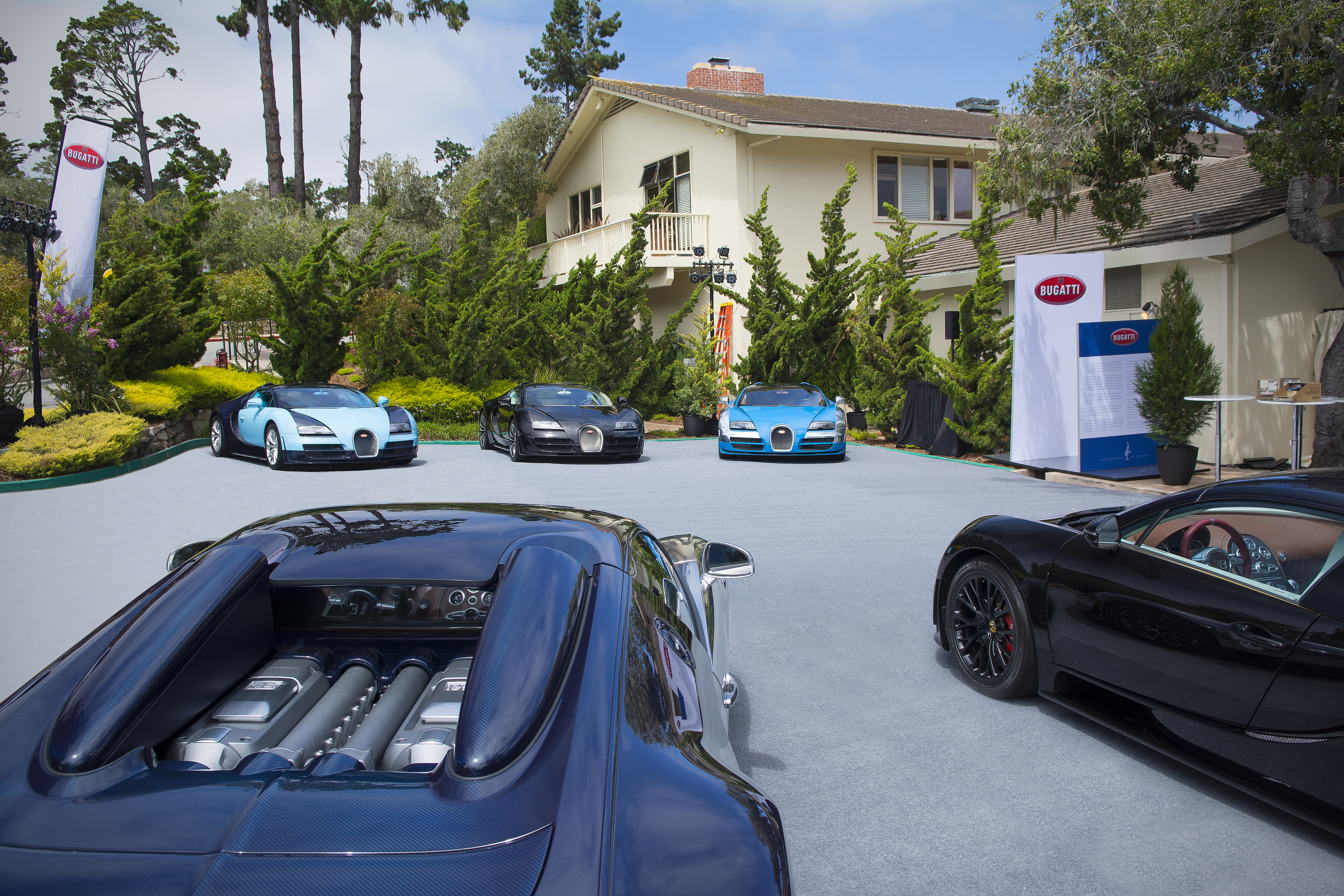
Bugatti Legends Edition

All six models in the Legend series are limited to three vehicles:

Name	Picture	Release date	Release price	Notes
Bugatti Legend "Jean-Pierre Wimille"		24 July 2013		Pays homage to the 1937 Bugatti Type 57G Tank race car that factory driver Jean-Pierre Wimille won Bugatti's first 24 Hours of Le Mans victory in 1937.
Bugatti Legend "Jean Bugatti"		9 September 2013	€2.28 million, excluding taxes and transport	Named after Jean Bugatti, the eldest son of company founder Ettore. Inspired by the Bugatti Type 57SC Atlantic "La Voiture Noire", and features Bugatti's first use of platinum in the badges.
Bugatti Legend "Meo Costantini"		5 November 2013	€2.09 million, excluding taxes and transport	This model is reminiscent of the Bugatti Type 35. One of the three model made, the only US-spec car, was sold in August 2020 at Bonhams Quail auction for US$1,750,000 inc. premium.
Bugatti Legend "Rembrandt Bugatti"		3 March 2014	€2.18 million, excluding taxes and transport	Named after Rembrandt Bugatti, the brother of company founder Ettore and one of the most important sculptors of the 20th century.
"Black Bess" Legend Vitesse		10 April 2014	€2.15 million, excluding taxes and transport	This model pays homage to the famed Bugatti Type 18 "Black Bess".
Bugatti Legend "Ettore Bugatti"		7 August 2014	€2.35 million, excluding taxes and transport	This model harks back to the Bugatti Type 41 Royale.

=== Records ===
A Bugatti Veyron 16.4 Grand Sport Vitesse driven by the Chinese racing driver Anthony Liu at Volkswagen Group's proving grounds in Ehra-Lessien became the fastest open-top production sports car, with a top speed of 408.84 km/h (254.04 mph).

After the world record attempt, Dr. Wolfgang Schreiber, President of Bugatti Automobiles S.A.S, said "When we introduced the Vitesse, we established the top speed for open-top driving to be 375 km/h. Still, we could not let go of the idea of reaching the 400 km/h mark with this car as well. The fact that we have succeeded in reaching 408.84 km/h is a thrill for me, and it reaffirms once again that Bugatti is the leader when it comes to technology in the international automotive industry." The driver, Anthony Liu, claimed "Even at such high speeds it remained incredibly comfortable and stable. With an open-top, you can really experience the sound of the engine and yet even at higher speeds I did not get compromised by the wind at all."

== Specifications (all variants) ==
Basic specifications
Layout and body style	Mid-engine, four-wheel drive, two-door coupé/targa top	Base price	Standard (Coupé), Grand Sport (Roadster): €1,225,000 (£1,065,000; US$1,700,000); Super Sport (Coupé), Grand Sport Vitesse (Roadster): €1,912,500 (£1,665,000; US$2,700,000)
Internal combustion engine	8.0 litre W16, 64v 2xDOHC quad-turbocharged petrol engine	Engine displacement and max. power	7,993 cc (487.8 cu in); Standard (Coupé), Grand Sport (Roadster): 1,001 PS (736 kW; 987 bhp) at 6,000 rpm Super Sport (Coupé), Grand Sport Vitesse (Roadster): 1,200 PS (882 kW; 1,183 bhp) at 6,400 rpm

Performance
	Standard, Grand Sport	Super Sport, Grand Sport Vitesse
Top Speed	408.47 km/h (253.81 mph)	431.072 km/h (267.856 mph); 415 km/h (258 mph) limited
0–100 km/h (62 mph)	2.46 seconds	
0–200 km/h (124 mph)	7.3 seconds	6.7 seconds
0–300 km/h (186 mph)	16.7 seconds	14.6 seconds
0–400 km/h (249 mph)	55.6 seconds	40 seconds (estimated)
Standing quarter-mile (402 m)	10.1 seconds	9.7 seconds
Standing mile (1609 m)	25.9 seconds at 328.9 km/h (204.4 mph)	23.6 seconds
Braking from 100 km/h (62 mph)	31.4 m	
0–300–0 km/h (0–186–0 mph)	27.8 seconds	22.5 seconds
0–322–0 km/h (0–200–0 mph)		25.6 seconds
Lateral acceleration	?	1.4 g

Fuel economy
EPA city driving	8 miles per U.S. gallon (29 L/100 km; 9.6 mpg_{‑imp})	EPA highway driving	14 miles per U.S. gallon (17 L/100 km; 17 mpg_{‑imp})
Top speed fuel economy		3 miles per U.S. gallon (78 L/100 km; 3.6 mpg_{‑imp}), or 1.4 U.S. gal (5.3 L; 1.2 imp gal) per minute	

== Special editions by car tuners ==
=== Bugatti Veyron Linea Vincero ===
The Bugatti Veyron Linea Vincero is a Veyron 16.4 modified by the German car modification firm Mansory.

The Linea Vincero has new wheel rims and new exterior lower bodywork. It extensively uses carbon fibre in the interior and exterior as well.

This car, with its interior and exterior customisations, is worth US$1 million more than a standard Veyron 16.4.

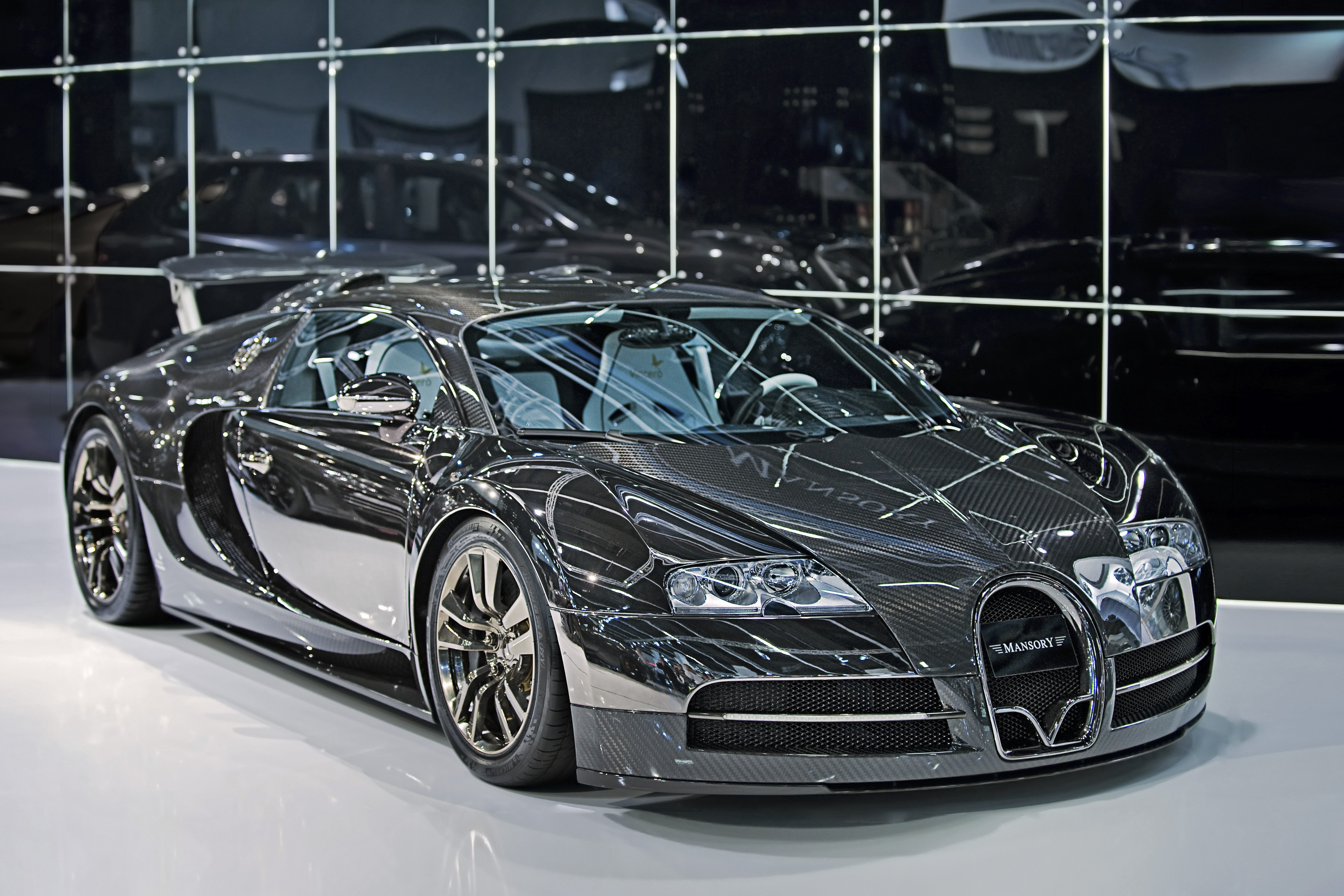
Bugatti Veyron Linea Vincero front view

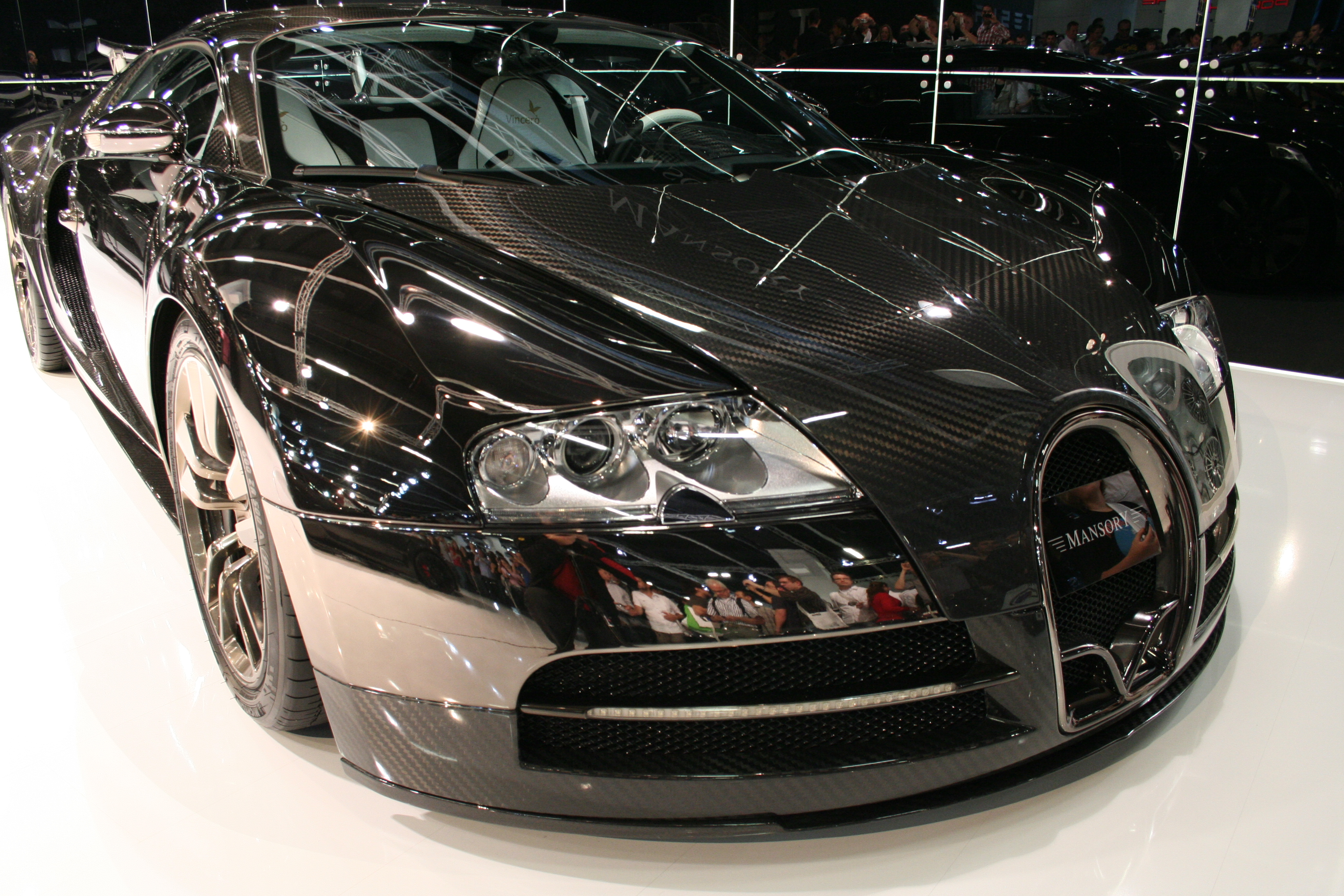
Bugatti Veyron Linea Vincero at the Frankfurt IAA, 2009

=== Bugatti Veyron Linea D'oro ===
The Bugatti Veyron Linea D'oro is a car made on the basis of the Veyron Grand Sport and the 16.4 by the German car modification firm Mansory.

The D'oro's exterior design is identical to its predecessor's but it has a few differences such as the gold paint on the badge, rims and other features. The iconic V-shaped badge is also present on this car's front grille.

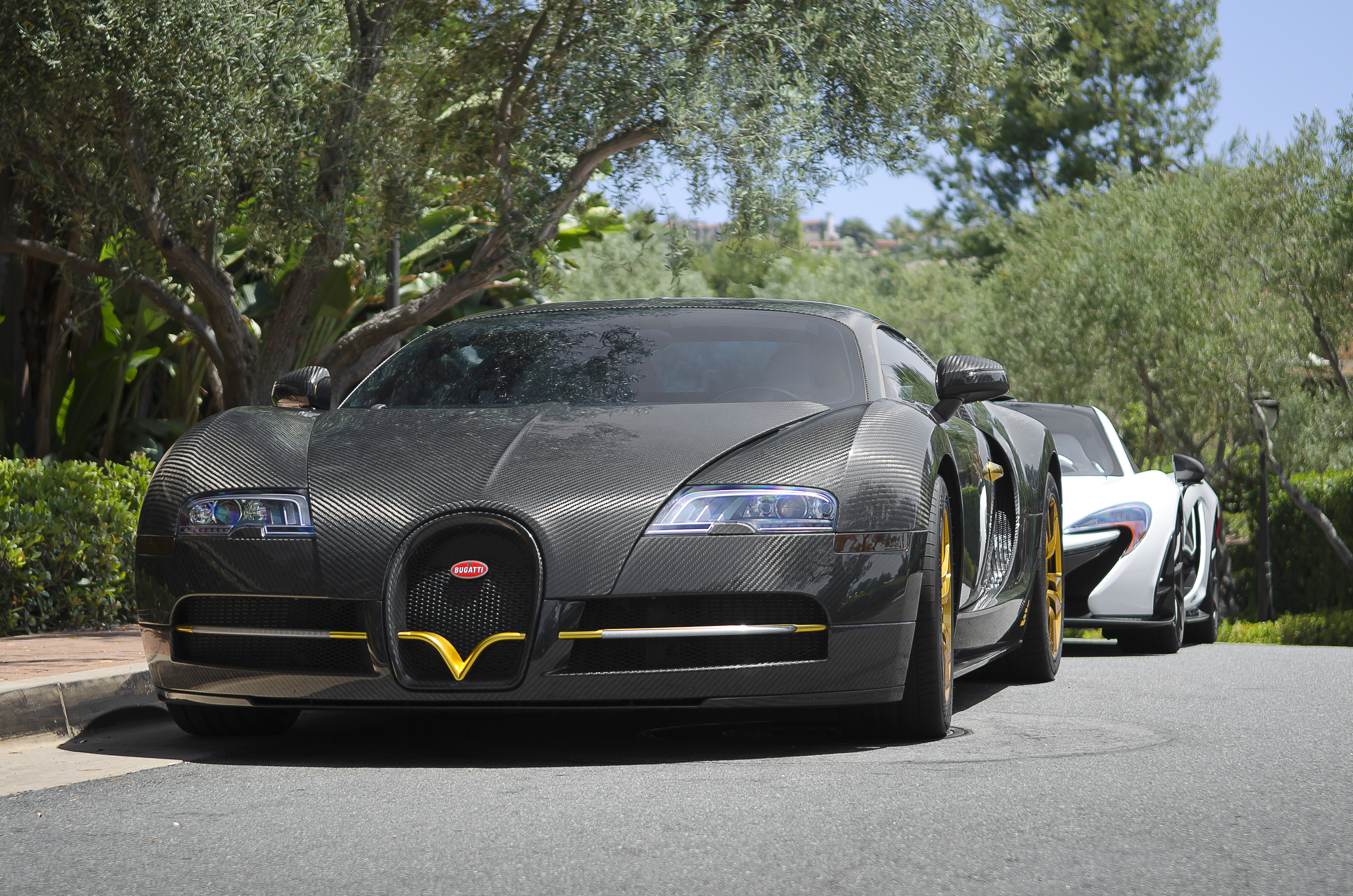
Bugatti Veyron Linea D'oro front view

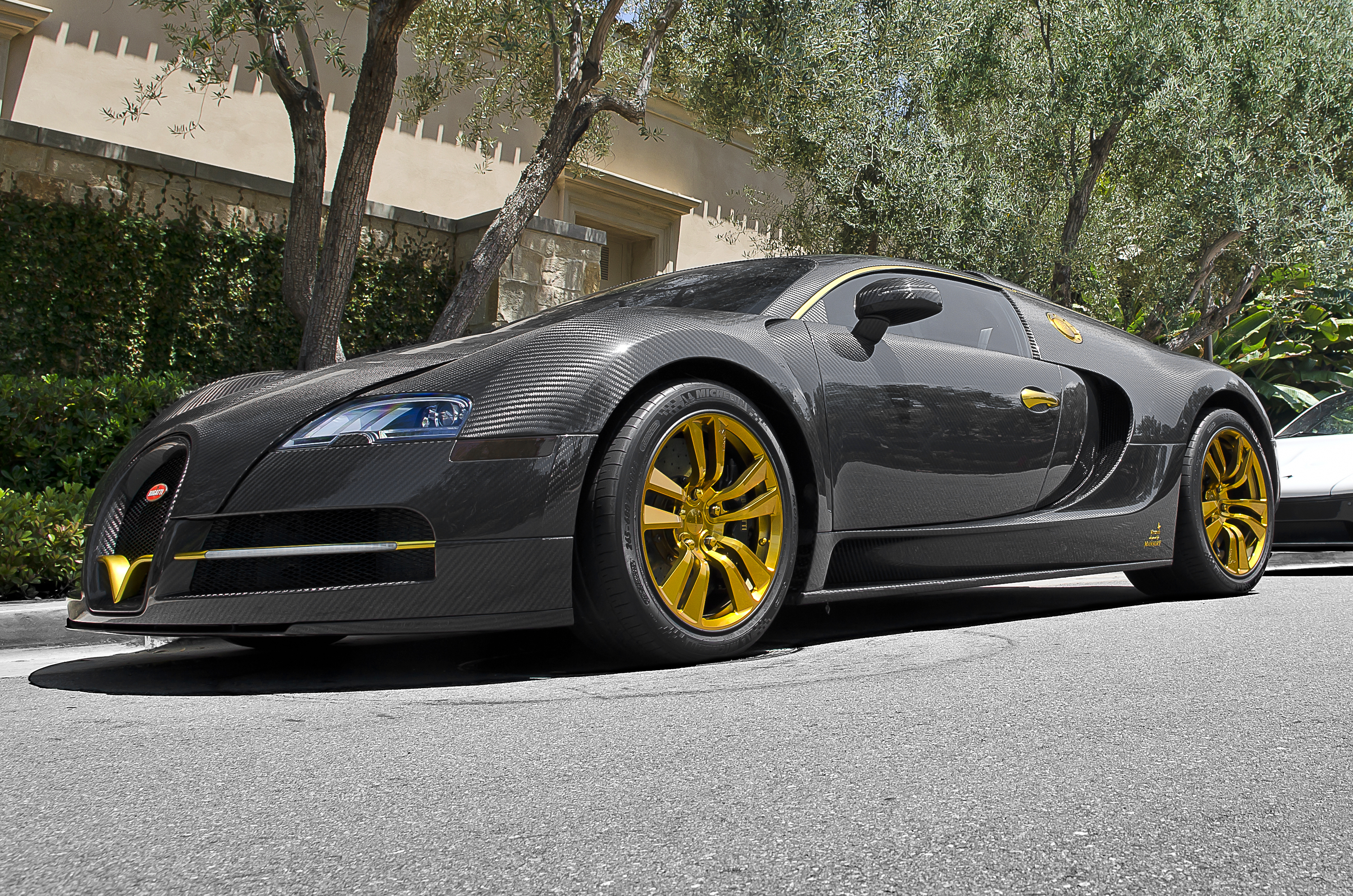
Bugatti Veyron Linea D'oro front 3/4 view

=== Bugatti Veyron Linea Viviere ===
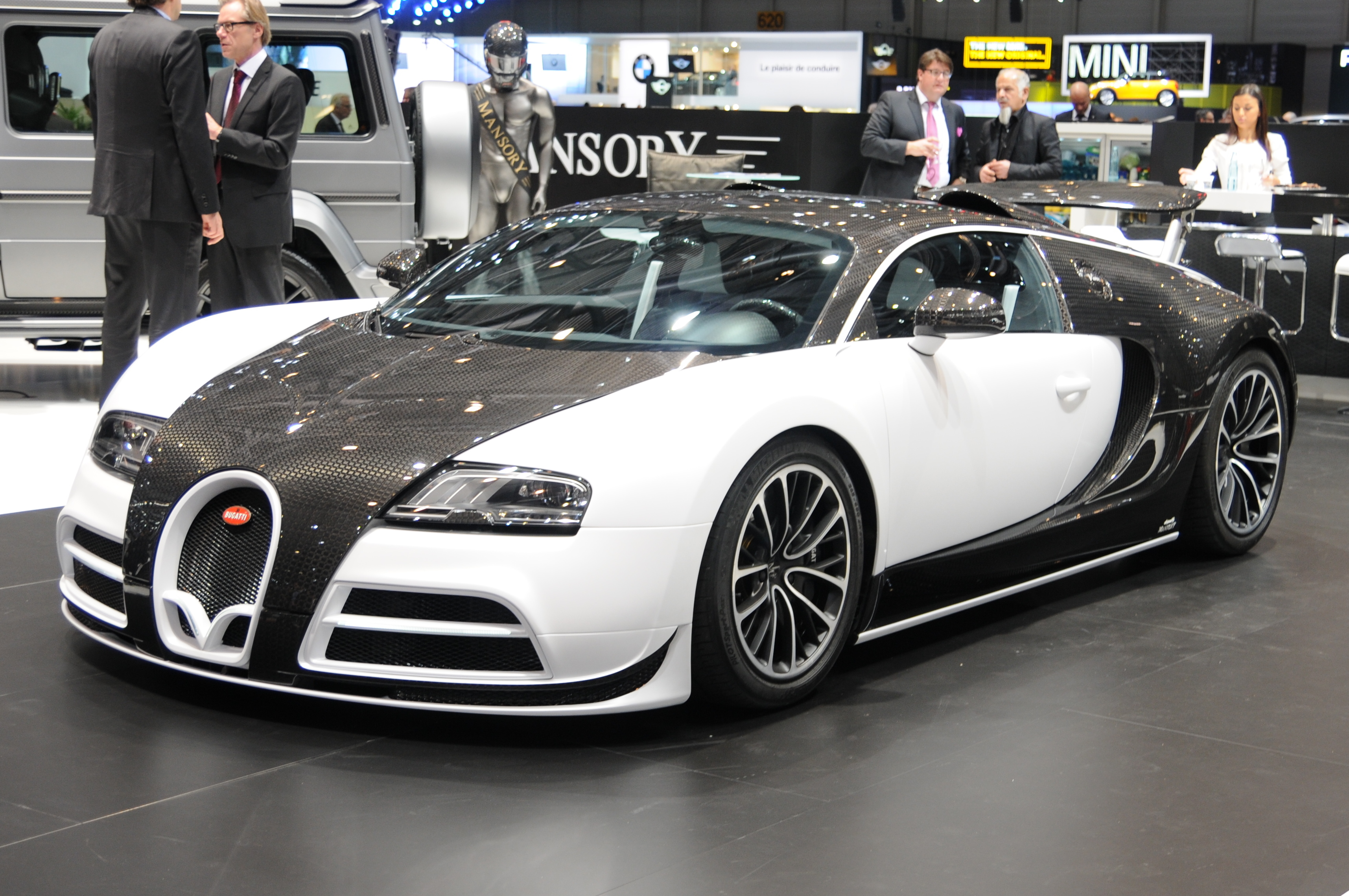
Bugatti Veyron Linea (Mansory) Viviere front view at the Geneva Motor Show, 2014

The Bugatti Veyron Linea Viviere (commonly known as the Mansory Viviere) is a car made on the basis of the Bugatti Veyron Super Sport by the German car modification firm Mansory.

This car's exterior design features the iconic V-shaped front grille and an additional exhaust system below its rear lights. The interior has been handcrafted and carbon fibre has been extensively used.

This car has a second generation known as the Viviere Diamond Edition which has been made on the same basis. This car is the final Veyron Edition tuned by Mansory and has a marble coloured exterior paintwork.

The Bugatti Veyron Linea Viviere costs US$2.3 million, making it one of the most expensive Veyrons ever produced.

== Production ==
As of 6 August 2014, 405 cars had been produced and delivered to customers worldwide, with orders that have already been placed for another 30. Bugatti was reported to produce 300 coupés and 150 roadsters up to the end of 2015. Production amounted to 450 units in a span of over 10 years. The final production vehicle, a Grand Sport Vitesse titled "La Finale" (The Last One), was displayed at the Geneva Motor Show from 5–15 March 2015.

Name	Units made
Veyron 16.4	252
Veyron Grand Sport	58
Veyron Super Sport	48
Veyron Grand Sport Vitesse	92
Total	450

== Future development ==
In 2008, Bugatti then-CEO Dr Franz-Josef Paefgen confirmed that the Veyron would be replaced by another high-end model by 2012. In 2011, the new CEO Wolfgang Dürheimer revealed that the company was planning to produce two models in the future — one a sports car-successor to the Veyron, the other a limousine known as the Bugatti 16C Galibier, which was later cancelled since Bugatti was later then working on a successor to the Veyron, which became the Bugatti Chiron.

The successor to the Veyron was unveiled in concept form as the Bugatti Vision Gran Turismo at the September 2015 Frankfurt Motor Show.

A toned-down version of the radically styled Vision Gran Turismo concept car, now called the Chiron, debuted at the March 2016 Geneva Motor Show. Production started in 2017 and production was limited to 500 units, with the final Chiron being produced in May 2024.

== Sales ==
Year	Units sold
2005	5
2006	44
2007	81
2008	71
2009	50
2010	40
2011	38^{1}
2012	31
2013	47
Total	407

1. The last Veyron, N^{o.} 450 was sold in May 2014.

== Reception ==
=== Top Gear ===
All three former presenters of the popular BBC motoring show Top Gear have given the Veyron considerable praise. While initially skeptical that the Veyron would ever be produced, Jeremy Clarkson later declared the Veyron "the greatest car ever made and the greatest car we will ever see in our lifetime", comparing it to Concorde and S.S. Great Britain. He noted that the production cost of a Veyron was £5 million, but was sold to customers for just £1 million. Volkswagen designed the car merely as a technical exercise. James May described the Veyron as "our Concorde moment". Clarkson test drove the Veyron from Alba in northern Italy to London in a race against May and Richard Hammond who made the journey in a Cessna 182 aeroplane.

A few episodes later, May drove the Veyron at the VW test track and took it to its top speed of 407.16 km/h (253.00 mph). In series 10, Hammond raced the Veyron against the Eurofighter Typhoon and lost. He also raced the car in Series 13 against a McLaren F1 driven by The Stig in a one-mile (1.6 km) drag race in Abu Dhabi. The commentary focused on Bugatti's "amazing technical achievement" versus the "non-gizmo" racing purity of the F1. While the F1 was quicker off the line and remained ahead until both cars were travelling at approximately 200 km/h (124 mph), the Bugatti overtook its competitor from 200 to 300 km/h (124 to 186 mph) and emerged the victor. Hammond has stated that he did not use the Veyron's launch control in order to make the race more interesting.

The Veyron also won the award for "Car of the Decade" in Top Gear's end of 2010 award show. Clarkson commented, "It was a car that just rewrote the rule book really, an amazing piece of engineering, a genuine Concorde moment". When the standard version was tested in 2008, it did not reach the top of the lap time leader board, with a time of 1:18.3, which was speculated as being due to the car's considerable weight disadvantage against the other cars towards the top. In 2010 the Super Sport version achieved the fastest ever time of 1:16.8 (dethroned the Gumpert Apollo S, replaced by the Ariel Atom V8 in 2011), as well as being taken to a verified average top speed of 431 km/h (268 mph) by Raphanel on the programme, thenceforth retaking its position as the fastest production car in the world.

=== Martin Roach ===
In 2011, Martin Roach's book Bugatti Veyron: A Quest for Perfection – The Story of the Greatest Car in the World took the stance that the car had now become so famous that it is effectively a bona fide celebrity. The book follows its author as he attempts to track down and drive the car, along the way interviewing chief designers, test drivers, and the president of Bugatti.

=== Gordon Murray ===
During its development period McLaren F1 designer Gordon Murray said in UK auto magazine Evo: "The most pointless exercise on the planet has got to be this four-wheel-drive, thousand-horsepower Bugatti." But after driving it he called it "a huge achievement".

Murray was impressed with the Veyron's engine and transmission after he test drove one for Road & Track magazine. He also praised its styling: "The styling is a wonderful mélange of classic curves and mechanical edges and elements — this should ensure that the car will still look good years from now, and therefore have a chance of becoming a future classic."

== See also ==
- List of fastest production cars
- List of production cars by power output
