= Diva (disambiguation) =

A diva is a celebrated female artist.

Diva may also refer to:

== People ==
- Diva Grabovčeva, legendary figure
- Diva Montelaba (born 1991), Filipino actress
- Diva More, Brazilian drag queen
- Diva Tarkas, Indonesian footballer
- Diva Zappa (born 1979), American musician
- Diva, American rapper from female rap group H.W.A.

== Books ==
- Diva (José de Alencar novel) (1864), by José de Alencar
- Diva (Odier novel), by Daniel Odier
- Diva, a character in the anime series Blood+
- Diva, a comic book character in the Stormwatch universe
- Diva (magazine), a UK magazine for lesbians

== Film and television ==
- The Diva, a 1929 German silent film
- Diva, winged cyborg-like angel from Cyber Team in Akihabara
- Diva (1981 film), a 1981 French film based on the Daniel Odier novel
- Diva (2007 film), a 2007 Malaysian film
- Diva (2020 film), a South Korean film
- Diva (2025 film), a Croatian-Herzegovinian biographical film
- "Diva" (Glee), a 2013 episode of Glee
- Diva (TV series), a 2010 Philippine musical drama television series
- Diva (TV network),
- Diva TV, a British TV channel
- Diva (Romanian TV Channel) a woman-based channel owned by Universal Networks International

== Music ==
- Diva (South Korean band), South Korean girl group 1997–2005
- Diva (Japanese band), a sub-unit of all-female Japanese pop group AKB48
- Diva Records, a record label
- VH1 Divas, a series of televised concerts of popular music

=== Albums and songs ===
- Diva (Marcia Hines album), 2001
- Diva (Ivy Queen album), 2003
- Diva (Jelena Karleuša album), 2012
- Diva (Annie Lennox album), 1992
- Diva (My Sister's Machine album), 1992
- "Diva" (After School song), 2009
- "Diva" (Beyoncé song), 2009
- "Diva" (Cir.Cuz song), 2011
- "Diva" (Dana International song), 1998
- "Diva" (Lali song), 2022
- "Diva" (The Kid Laroi song), 2020
- "Diva", a section of Arca's 2020 single "@@@@@"
- "Diva", a song by Ximena Sariñana from Amor Adolescente, 2021

== Medicine ==
- DIVA vaccines, enable Differentiation of Infected from Vaccinated Animals (DIVA) by using a different epitope from the wild form of the microbe
- DIVA skin test, to Detect Infected among Vaccinated Animals (DIVA) by using different antigens
- Diagnostic Interview for ADHD in Adults, a semi-structured interview tool designed to evaluate attention deficit hyperactivity disorder (ADHD)

== Technology ==
- Digital Information Virtual Archive, at San Francisco State University
- Digital Interface for Video and Audio, a digital interface for video and audio
- Diva (car manufacturer), a UK sports car manufacturer in the 1960s
- DIVA software, software which allows the spatial interpolation/gridding of data in an optimal way
- DTA Diva, a French ultralight trike wing design
- Bognor Diva, a Uruguayan version of the off-road vehicle Lada Niva
- D.Va, a fictional hero appearing in the 2016 video game Overwatch
- Hatsune Miku: Project DIVA, a rhythm game series made by Sega

== Other uses ==
- DiVA (open archive), a Swedish digital scientific archive
- D.C. Divas, a team in the Women's Football Alliance
- Diva cup, a brand name of a menstrual cup
- DIVA, an accessories chain of Castro (clothing)
- Diva Junction railway station, a railway station in Mumbai
- DIVA Museum for Diamonds, Jewellery and Silver in Antwerp
- WWE Diva, a former branding term for women wrestlers, managers, interviewers, or ring announcers in World Wrestling Entertainment
- Diva, a former Australian jewellery retailer owned by Lovisa
- Diva, a town near Mumbai, in state of Maharashtra, India

== See also ==
- Deva (disambiguation)
- Devi (disambiguation), the female aspect of the divine in Hinduism
- Divo (disambiguation)
- La Diva (disambiguation)
