= Divo =

Divo or DIVO may refer to:

- Divo, Ivory Coast, a town in the Ivory Coast
- Divo Department, a department of the Ivory Coast
- Il Divo, an operatic pop quartet
- Il Divo (film), an Italian film directed by Paolo Sorrentino
- Divo (record label), an Indian-based record label
- Albert Divo (1895-1966), an early twentieth century Grand Prix motor racing driver
- Bugatti Divo, a track-focused sports car manufactured by Bugatti

== See also ==
- Devo, an American New Wave group
