= La Diva =

La Diva may refer to:

- La Diva (group), a Filipino girl group
- La Diva (Aretha Franklin album), 1979
- La Diva (Katherine Jenkins album), 2004
- Ivy Queen (born 1972), Puerto Rican musician
  - Diva (Ivy Queen album), 2004
- "La Diva", a 2007 song by Celine Dion, from her album D'elles

== See also ==
- Diva (disambiguation)
