= Bugatti Chiron =

Sports car manufactured by Bugatti

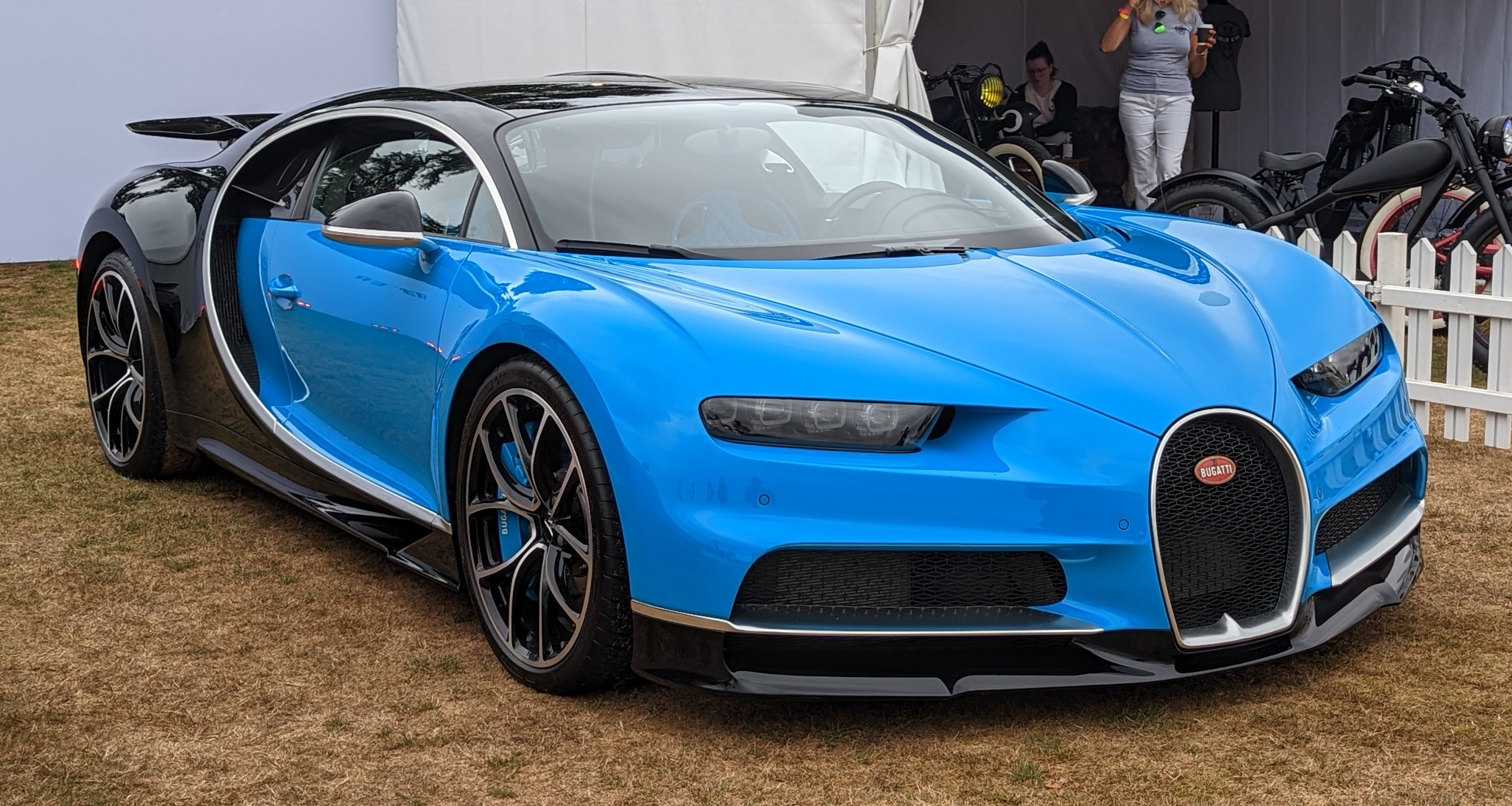

Overview
- Manufacturer: Bugatti Automobiles
- Production: 2016–2024
- Assembly: France: Molsheim (Bugatti Molsheim Plant)
- Designer: Achim Anscheidt (Head of Design); Frank Heyl; Sasha Selipanov; Etienne Salome

Body and chassis
- Class: Sports car (S)
- Body style: 2-door coupé
- Layout: Mid-engine, four-wheel-drive layout, All-wheel drive vehicle
- Related: Bugatti Divo; Bugatti Centodieci; Bugatti Bolide; Bugatti Mistral

Powertrain
- Engine: 8.0 L (488 cu in) quad-turbocharged W16
- Power output: 1,103 kW (1,479 hp; 1,500 PS) (Chiron, Chiron Sport, Chiron Pur Sport, Chiron Noire); 1,177 kW (1,578 hp; 1,600 PS) (Chiron Super Sport 300+, Chiron Super Sport)
- Transmission: 7-speed Ricardo dual-clutch automatic

Dimensions
- Wheelbase: 2,711 mm (106.7 in)
- Length: 4,544 mm (178.9 in)
- Width: 2,038 mm (80.2 in)
- Height: 1,212 mm (47.7 in)
- Kerb weight: 1,996 kg (4,400 lb) (est); 1,978 kg (4,360 lb) (est) (Chiron Sport)

Chronology
- Predecessor: Bugatti Veyron
- Successor: Bugatti Tourbillon

The Bugatti Chiron is a mid-engine two-seater sports car designed and developed in Germany by Bugatti Engineering GmbH. It was manufactured in Molsheim, France, by French automobile manufacturer Bugatti Automobiles S.A.S. The successor to the Bugatti Veyron, the Chiron was first shown at the Geneva Motor Show on 1 March 2016. The car's design was initially previewed with the Bugatti Vision Gran Turismo concept car unveiled at the 2015 Frankfurt Auto Show.

The car is named after the Monégasque driver Louis Chiron. The car shares the name with the 1999 Bugatti 18/3 Chiron concept car.

== Specifications and performance ==
The main carry over component from the Veyron is the 7,993 cc (8.0 L; 487.8 cu in) quad-turbocharged W16 engine, though it is heavily updated. The engine in the Chiron has a peak power output of 1,103 kW (1,479 hp; 1,500 PS) at 6,700 rpm and 1,600 N⋅m (1,180 lb⋅ft) of torque starting from 2,000 to 6,000 rpm. The engine in the most powerful variant of its predecessor, the Veyron Super Sport, generates 221 kW (296 hp; 300 PS) less than the new Chiron, while the engine in the original Veyron generates 367 kW (492 hp; 499 PS) less power.

Like its predecessor, the Veyron, the Chiron utilises a carbon fibre body structure, independent suspension and a Haldex All-wheel drive system. The carbon fibre body has a stiffness of 50,000 Nm per degree.

The Chiron can accelerate from 0–100 km/h (0–62 mph) in 2.4 seconds according to the manufacturer, 0–200 km/h (0–124 mph) in 6.5 seconds and 0–300 km/h (0–186 mph) in 13.6 seconds. In a world-record-setting test at the time in 2017, the Chiron reached 400 km/h (249 mph) in 32.6 seconds, after which it needed 9.4 seconds to brake to standstill.

The Chiron's top speed is electronically limited to 420 km/h (261 mph), or 375–380 km/h (233–236 mph) without the specific key, for safety reasons, mainly arising from the tyres as Bugatti concluded that no tyre currently manufactured would be able to handle the stress at the top speed the Chiron is capable of achieving. Independent testing by an owner has indicated that the Chiron can easily attain its limited top speed. Mixed fuel consumption is 22.5 L/100 km (12.55 mpg_{‑imp}; 10.45 mpg_{‑US}).

== Sales ==
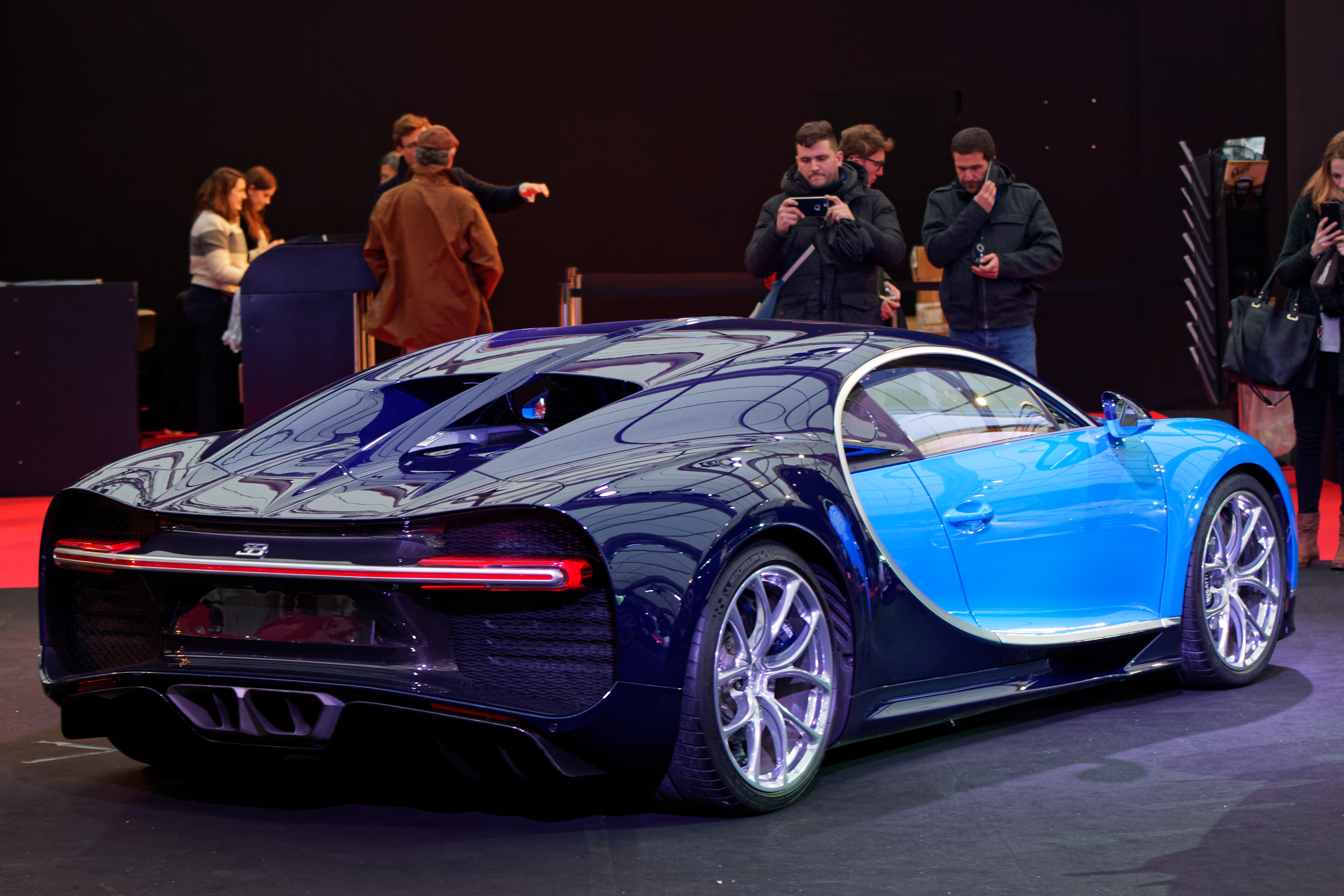
Two-tone paint is a distinctive option

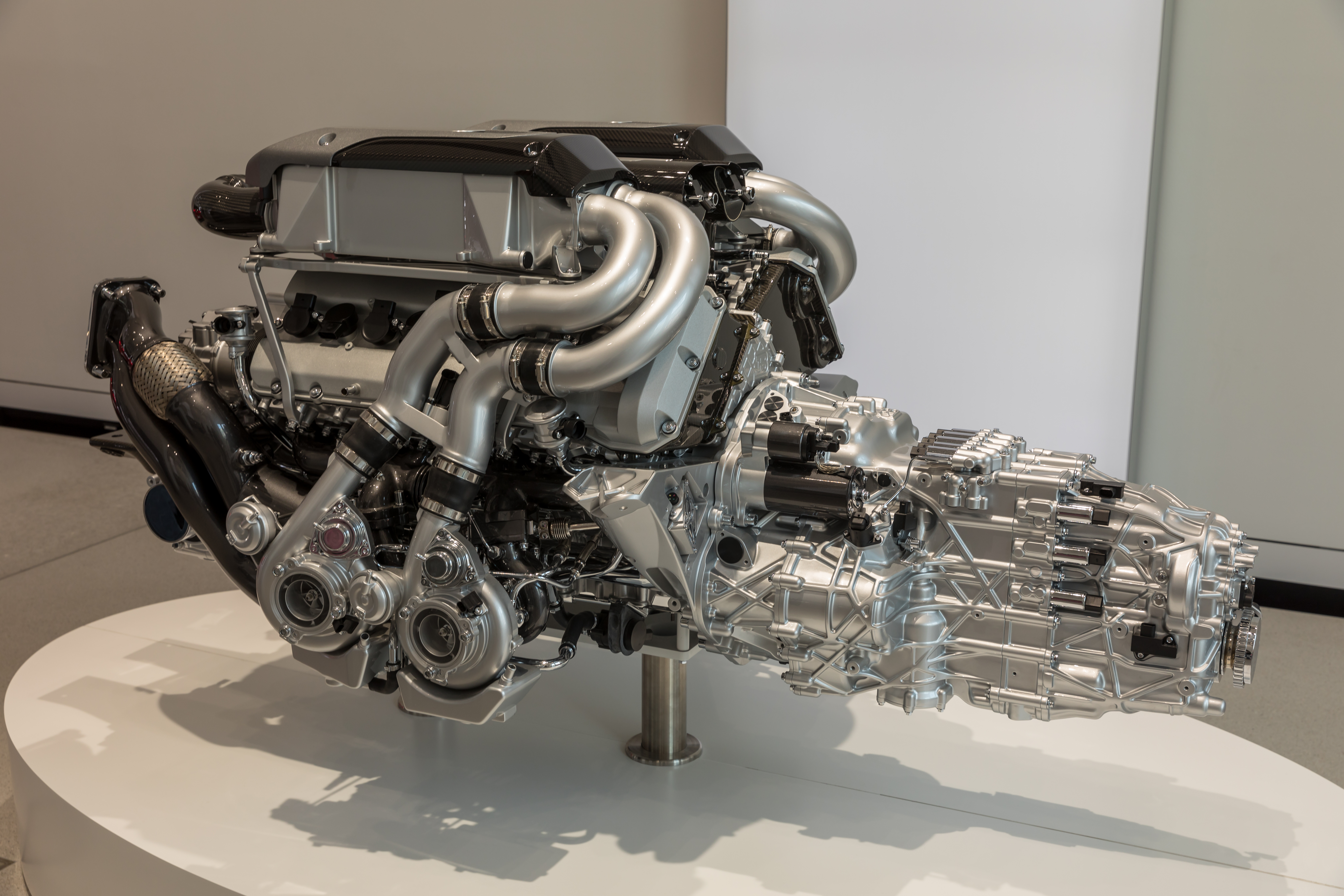
The quad-turbocharged W16 engine of the Chiron with attached dual-clutch transmission

The first 200 cars were sold before the first was delivered. The base price is €2,400,000 and buyers were required to place a €200,000 deposit before their purchase. The first three Chiron were delivered to their owners in Europe and the Middle East in March 2017. In January 2022, every Chiron had been sold. In September 2023, Bugatti built the last base-spec (non-variant) Chiron; a Nocturne Black and Copper Chiron with a "Copper" tan interior. The Chiron production run ended in May 2024 with the Chiron L'Ultime. A North-American market Super Sport model with fading blue paint and writings of the Chiron's history and achievements all over the car. However, Bugatti still continues to manufacture cars based on the Chiron.

== Variants ==
=== Chiron Sport (2018) ===
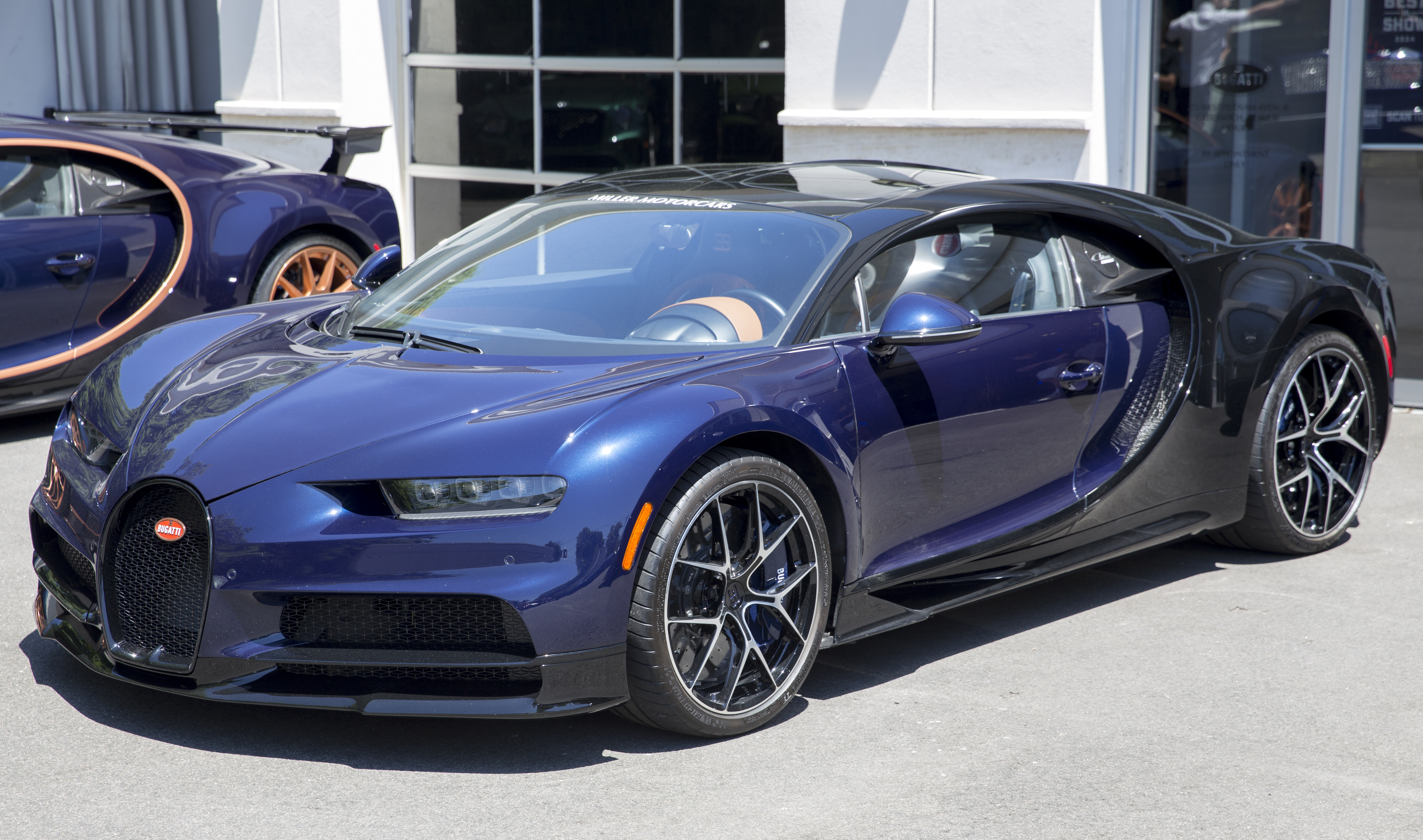
Bugatti Chiron Sport

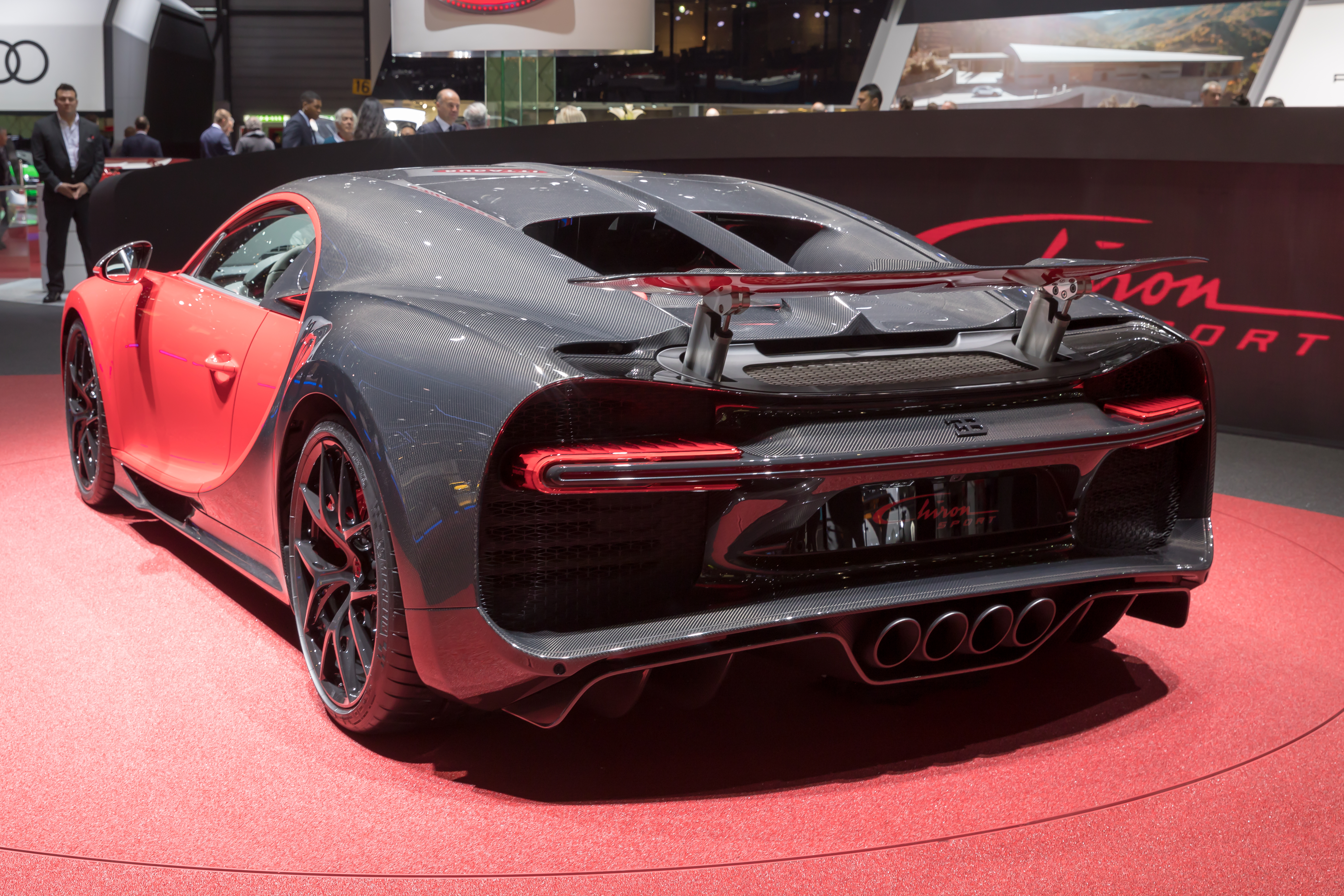
Bugatti Chiron Sport rear view. Note the new round exhaust system. Photo taken at the Geneva Motor Show 2018.

At the 2018 Geneva Motor Show, Bugatti unveiled the track focused version of the Chiron, named the Chiron Sport. Mechanically the car is identical to the regular version, generating 1,500 PS (1,105 kW; 1,480 hp) from a quad-turbocharged W16 engine but is 18 kg (40 lb) lighter due to a lighter, more unrestricted exhaust system, the extensive use of carbon fibre, and a stiffer suspension in order to increase the cornering ability of the car while maintaining its grand touring characteristics. The steering of the car has also received modifications and a torque vectoring system to control the power sent to each wheel of the car for improved handling in tight corners has been added. Aerodynamic improvements and light weight have been given special consideration in order to keep the car competitive on the race track. The Chiron Sport became available in late 2018 for an additional US$400,000 on the standard Chiron.

In April 2022, Bugatti issued a factory recall for a 2018 Chiron, built 16 November 2017, due to a loose front frame support screw.

=== Chiron Sport 110 Ans Bugatti (2019) ===
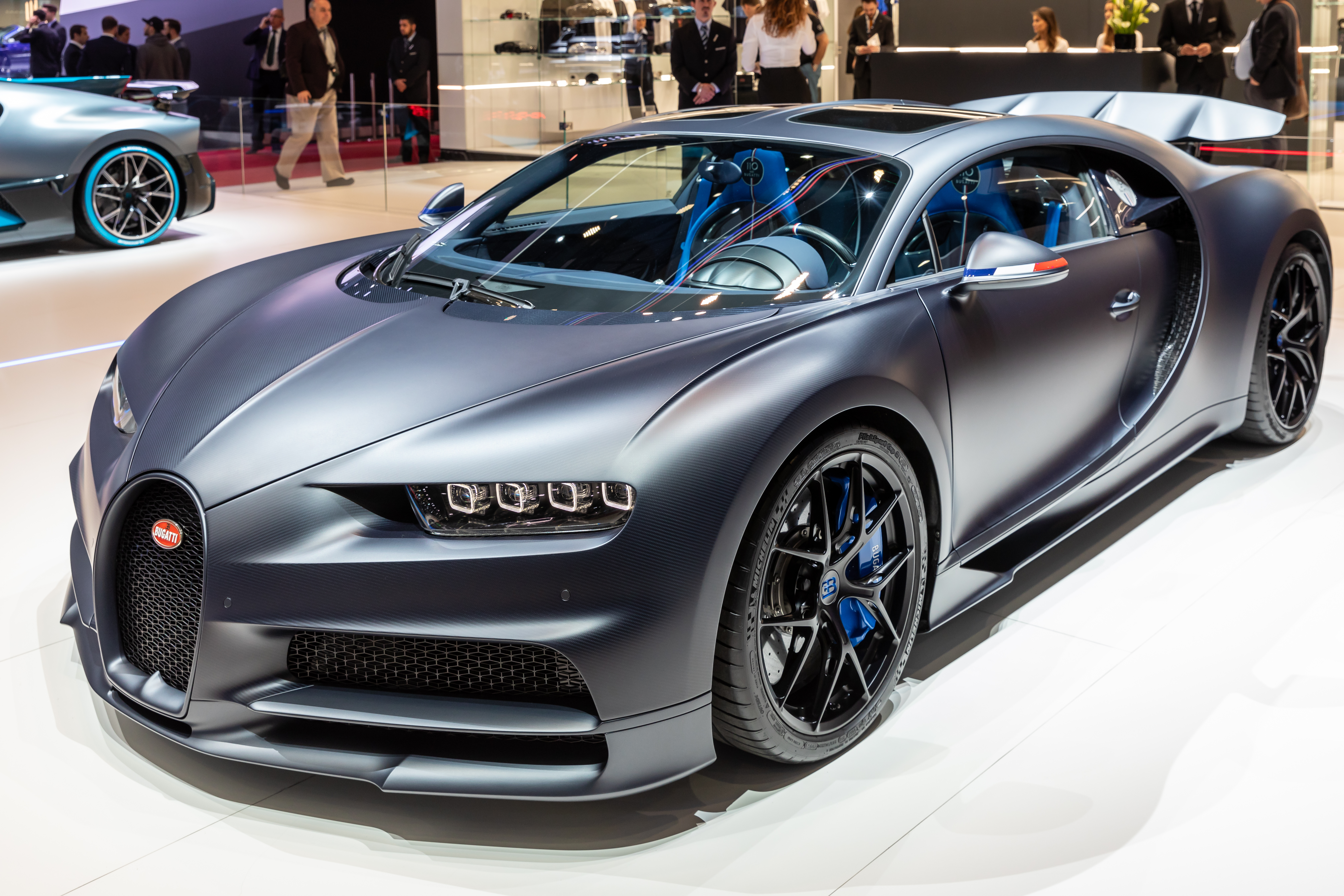
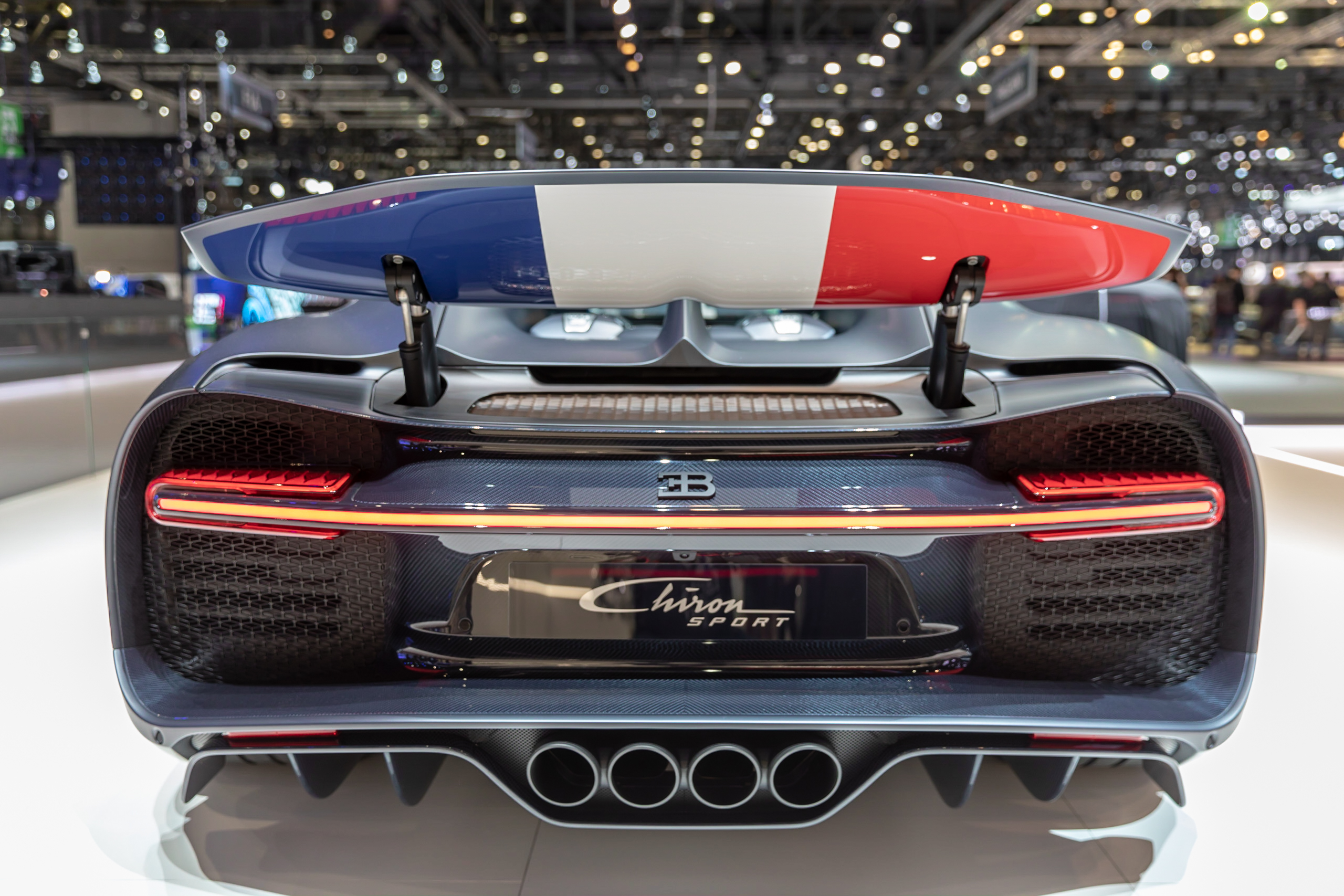
The 110 Ans Bugatti at the Geneva Motor Show. Note the colours of the French flag on the underside of the rear wing

Introduced in February 2019, the 110 Ans Bugatti is a limited edition variant of the Chiron Sport developed to celebrate 110 years of Bugatti. The car features carbon fibre bodywork finished in matte Steel Blue exterior colour. The body is also accented with Steel Blue bare carbon fibre. The exhaust system of the car is finished in matte black colour.

The colours of the French flag are present on the wing mirrors, fuel filler cap and on the underside of the rear wing. The brake calipers are finished in blue colour.

The interior of the car is upholstered in blue Alcantara and also has the colours of the French flag present on the headrests of the seats, on the back of the seats and on top of the steering wheel. Production was limited to 20 units.

=== Chiron Super Sport 300+ (2019) ===
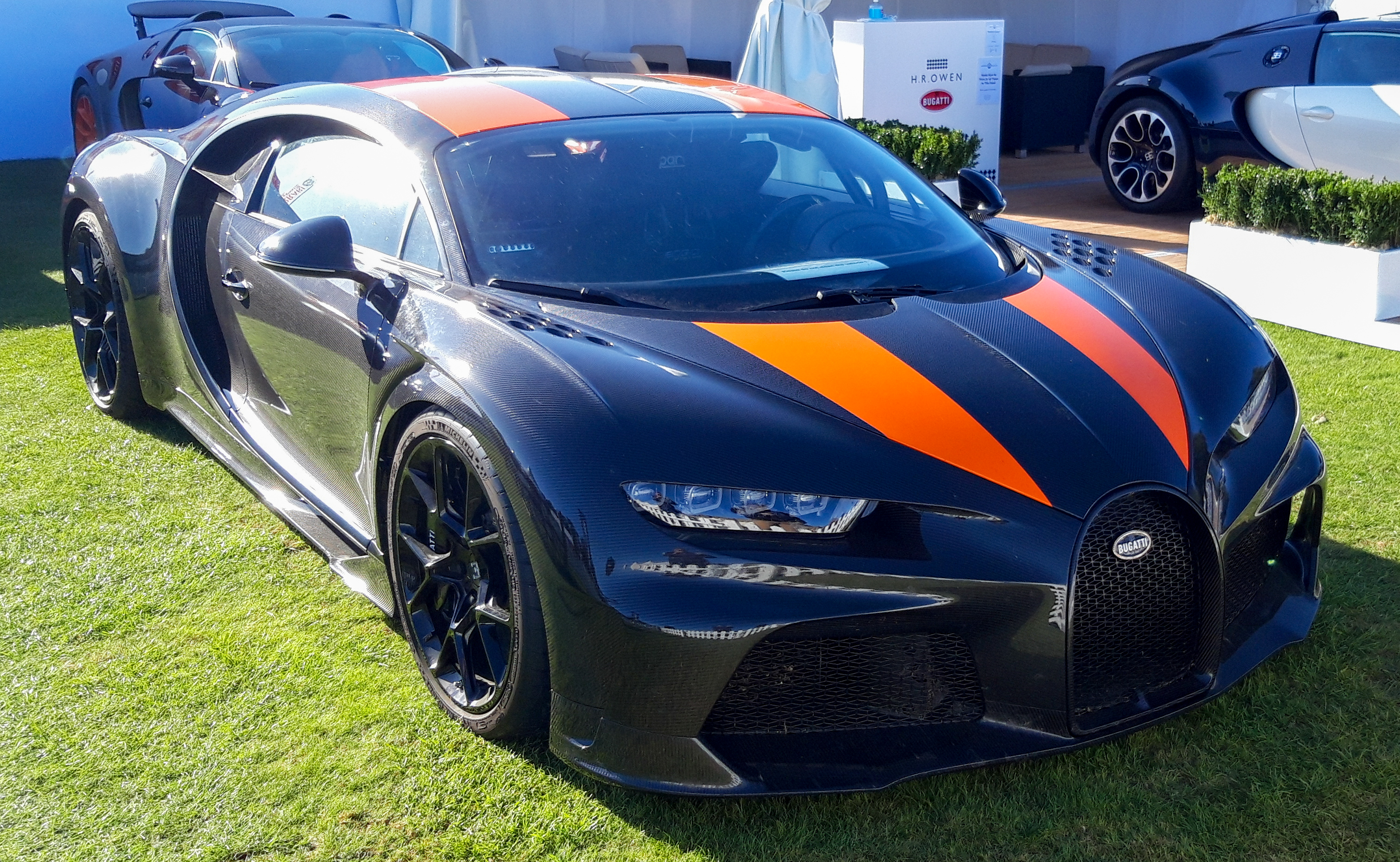
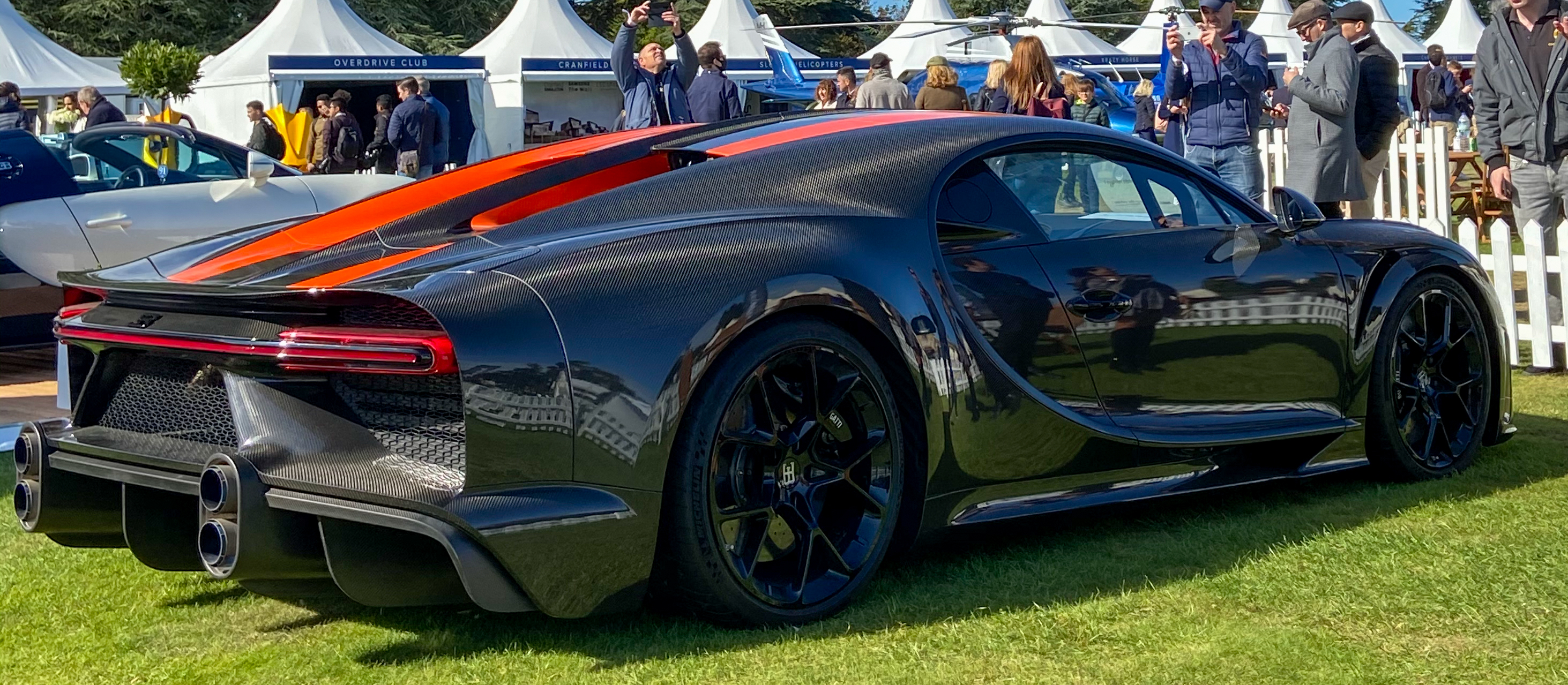
Bugatti Chiron Super Sport 300+ at the Salon Privé Concours d'Elegance 2020, Blenheim Palace.

On 8 September 2019, Bugatti presented a limited production high performance variant of the Chiron called the Chiron Super Sport 300+ to owners taking part in the company's 110th-anniversary tour in Europe. The variant is limited to 30 examples at a net unit price of 3.5 million euros. Changes from the standard Chiron include a more powerful engine, increased top speed, and a characteristic paint scheme featuring a lacquer-coated carbon fibre body with orange stripes, echoing the aesthetics of the company's previous top speed record-breaking cars, the Veyron Super Sport World Record Edition and the Veyron Grand Sport Vitesse World Record Car.

The car is powered by a 1,600 PS (1,175 kW; 1,580 hp) quad-turbocharged W16 engine shared with the Bugatti Centodieci, nicknamed "Thor". This car has a grey Bugatti logo made of black enamel and silver, the exhaust system from the Centodieci, a modified gearbox with longer ratios and front and rear bumpers optimised for aerodynamics at high speed, resulting in the overall length increase of the car by 248.9 mm (9.8 in).

The Super Sport 300+ was also equipped with a top speed limiter, akin to the one found in the standard Chiron. Without the limiter, Bugatti claimed the car could attain a maximum speed in excess of 483 km/h (300 mph), with 490 km/h (304.7 mph) being achieved in August 2019 with a pre-production model. Bugatti also prepared the cars of owners who want to take the car to its full potential at the Ehra-Lessien test track.

The first eight were delivered in September 2021.

Bugatti delivered the final Chiron Super Sport 300+ on 21 July 2022.

=== Chiron Noire (2020) ===
Bugatti announced a special-edition, the Chiron Noire, celebrating the 1936 Bugatti Type 57SC Coupé Aero No. 57453 (also known as "La Voiture Noire") following the 2019 one-off homage and namesake "La Voiture Noire". The special edition comes in two versions, the Noire Élégance (black exposed carbon body) and the Noire Sportive (black exposed carbon body covered with a matte black finish). Only 20 were made. The Noire starts at around $3.3 million, and deliveries are expected to begin in mid-2020. The Chiron Noire package is available for the entry-level Chiron or the Chiron Sport, in this case at an extra charge of €100,000.

=== Chiron Pur Sport (2020) ===
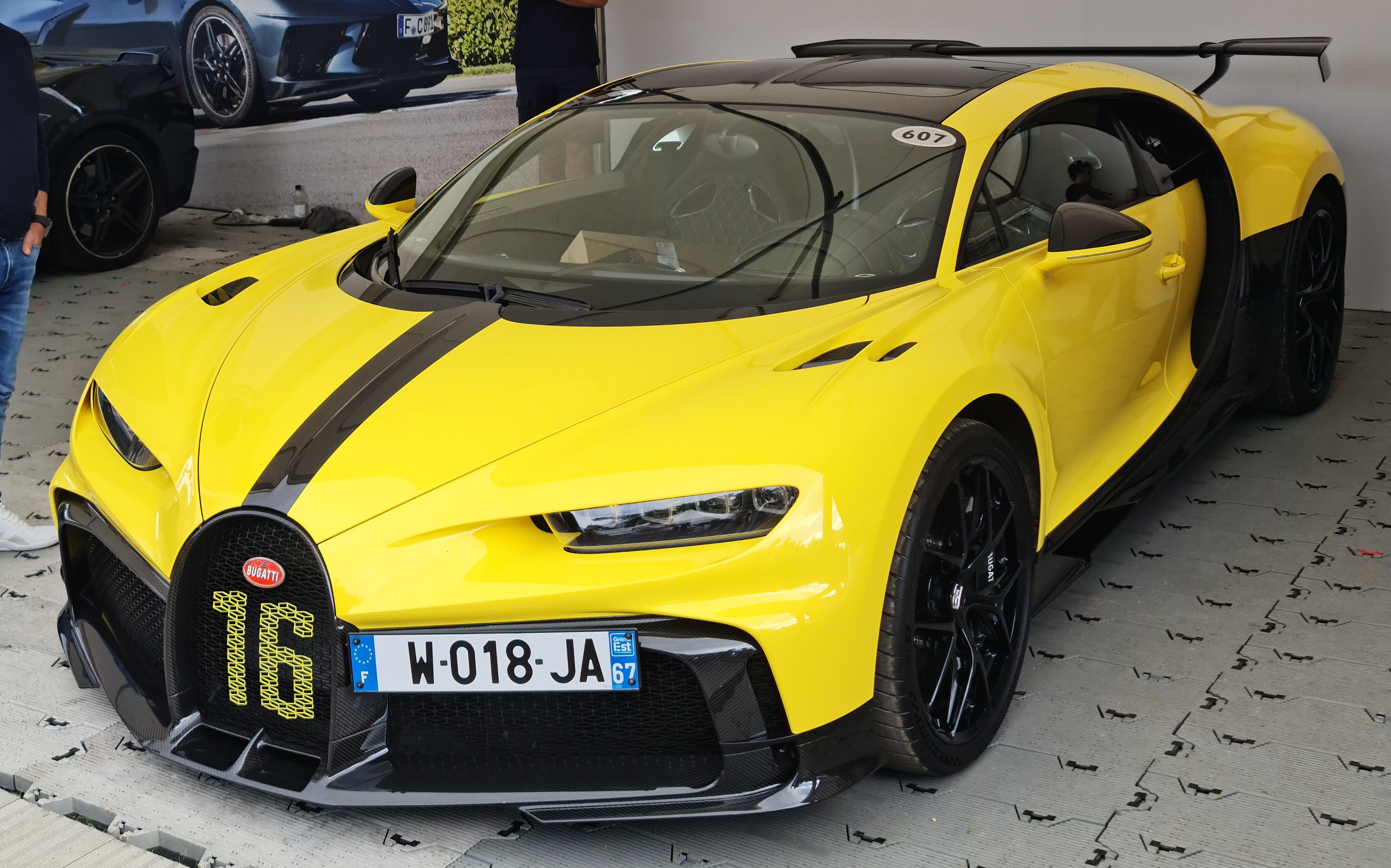
Bugatti Chiron Pur Sport front view

On 3 March 2020, Bugatti introduced the Chiron Pur Sport, a handling-focused model limited to 60 units. The tachometer has an additional 200 rpm, increasing the redline to 6,900 rpm. 80 per cent of the transmission has been revised for a 15 per cent closer gear-ratio spread benefiting the power band. The Pur Sport is 50 kg (110 lb) lighter than the standard Chiron due to a lightweight 3D printed titanium exhaust, a fixed rear spoiler and extensive use of Alcantara, anodised aluminium and titanium on the interior. The front horseshoe grille is also wider than on a regular Chiron. The wheels have special spokes called "aero blades" which are designed to channel turbulent air near the wheel down the side of the vehicle to the rear diffuser. The tyres are Michelin Sport Cup 2R increasing lateral grip by 10 per cent, and were co-developed with Michelin. To improve handling, the springs were made 65 per cent stiffer at the front and 33 per cent at the rear, aided by revised damper tuning and wheel camber along with additional front and rear carbon-fibre anti-roll bars and a new Sport+ drive mode. Production of the Pur Sport was to start in late 2020. The first car was delivered to the owner in United States in January 2021. Deliveries reached the halfway mark on 1 December 2022.

=== Chiron Sport Les Légendes du Ciel (2020) ===
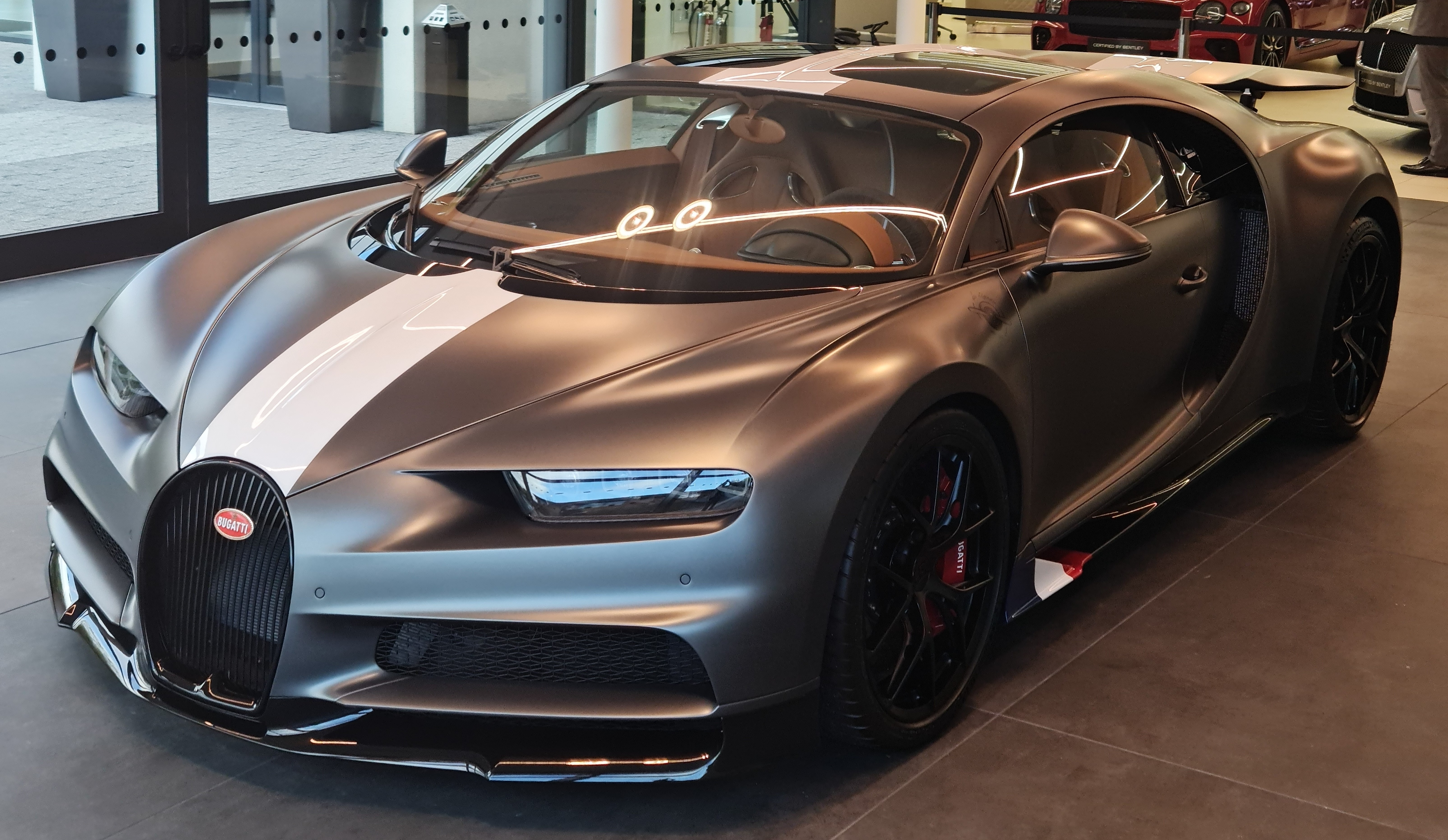
Bugatti Chiron Sport Les Légendes Du Ciel

Introduced in November 2020, the "Les Légendes du Ciel" Chiron is a limited-edition version of the Chiron Sport developed to celebrate Bugatti's racing drivers that flew in the French Air Force.

The car features a new grille, a French flag behind the front wheels, a matte grey ("Gris Serpent") exterior colour with a gloss white stripe in the centre. The interior is upholstered in tan leather and turned aluminium.

Production was limited to 20 units and started in late 2020 at €2.88 million each.

=== Chiron Super Sport (2021) ===
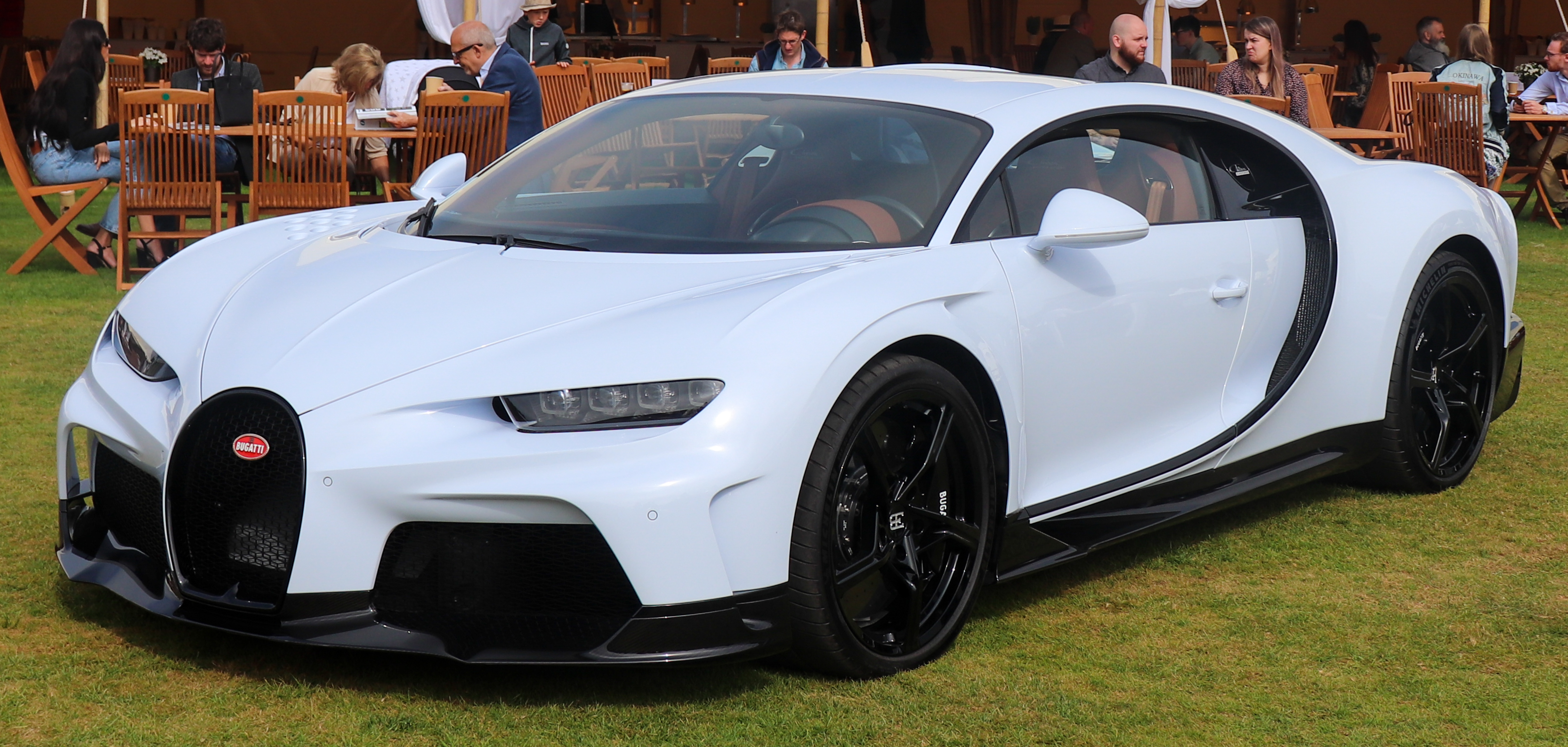

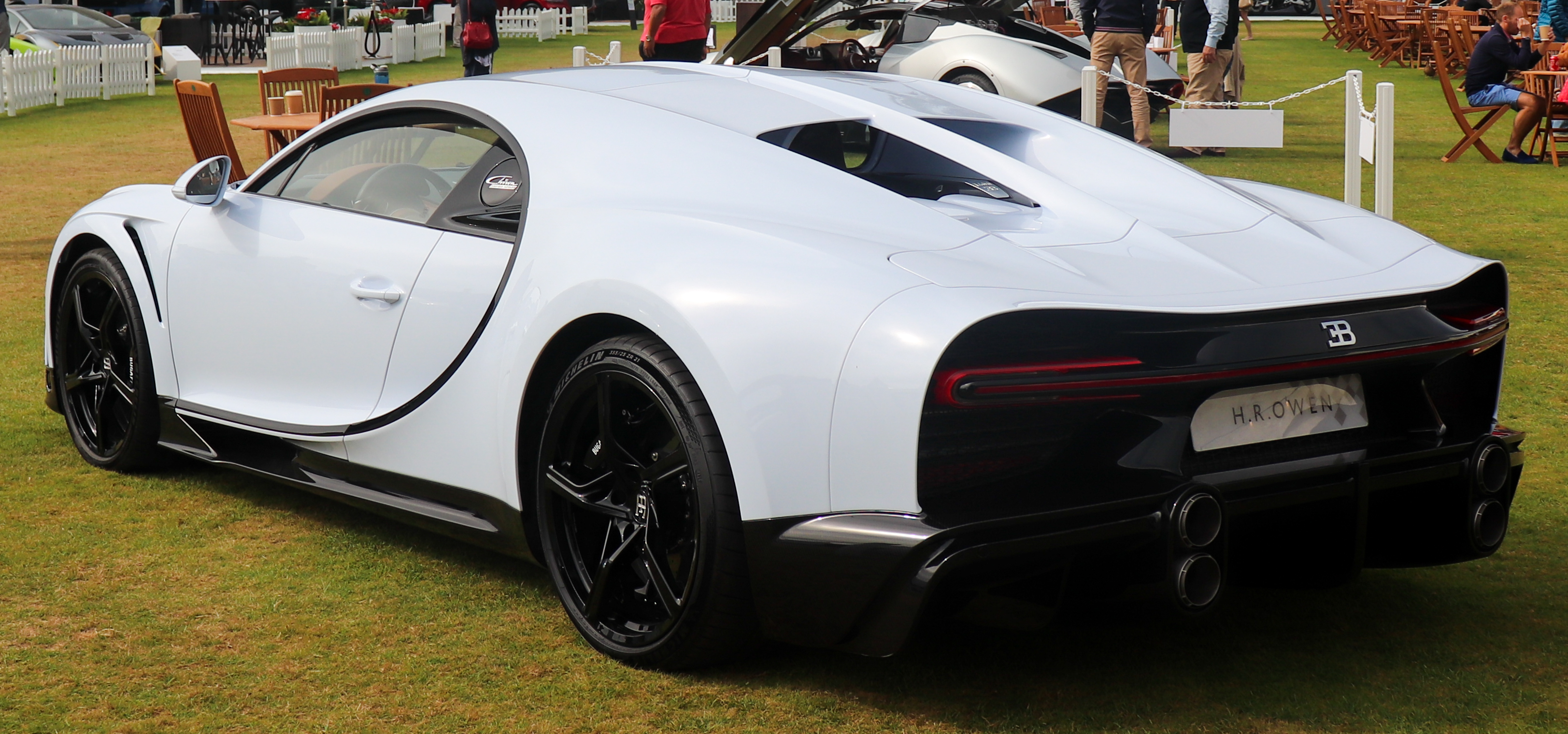
Bugatti Chiron Super Sport

On 8 June 2021, Bugatti introduced the standard version of the 300+ world record car. Unlike the 300+, it does not come with interior stiffening and has more leather in the interior like a typical Bugatti Chiron. More visual differences include special redesigned wheels and a paint finish instead of the bare carbon fibre seen in the 300+. The Chiron Super Sport had the same power output as the 300+ but was limited to 440 km/h (273 mph). It also has the capability to accelerate from 0–200 km/h (0–124 mph) in 5.8 seconds and from 0–300 km/h (0–186 mph) in 12.1 seconds. Unlike the 300+, the limiter cannot be disabled by Bugatti in the Super Sport for prepared runs. Customer delivery started in early 2022 at a net unit price of €3.2 million each. The first car was delivered in April 2022. About 70–80 were built, including the L'Ultime, which is the very last of the Chiron series. It is the last car to use the Bugatti W16 engine, and likely the last car to use an engine of this layout in general.

=== Chiron Pur Sport Grand Prix (2021) ===
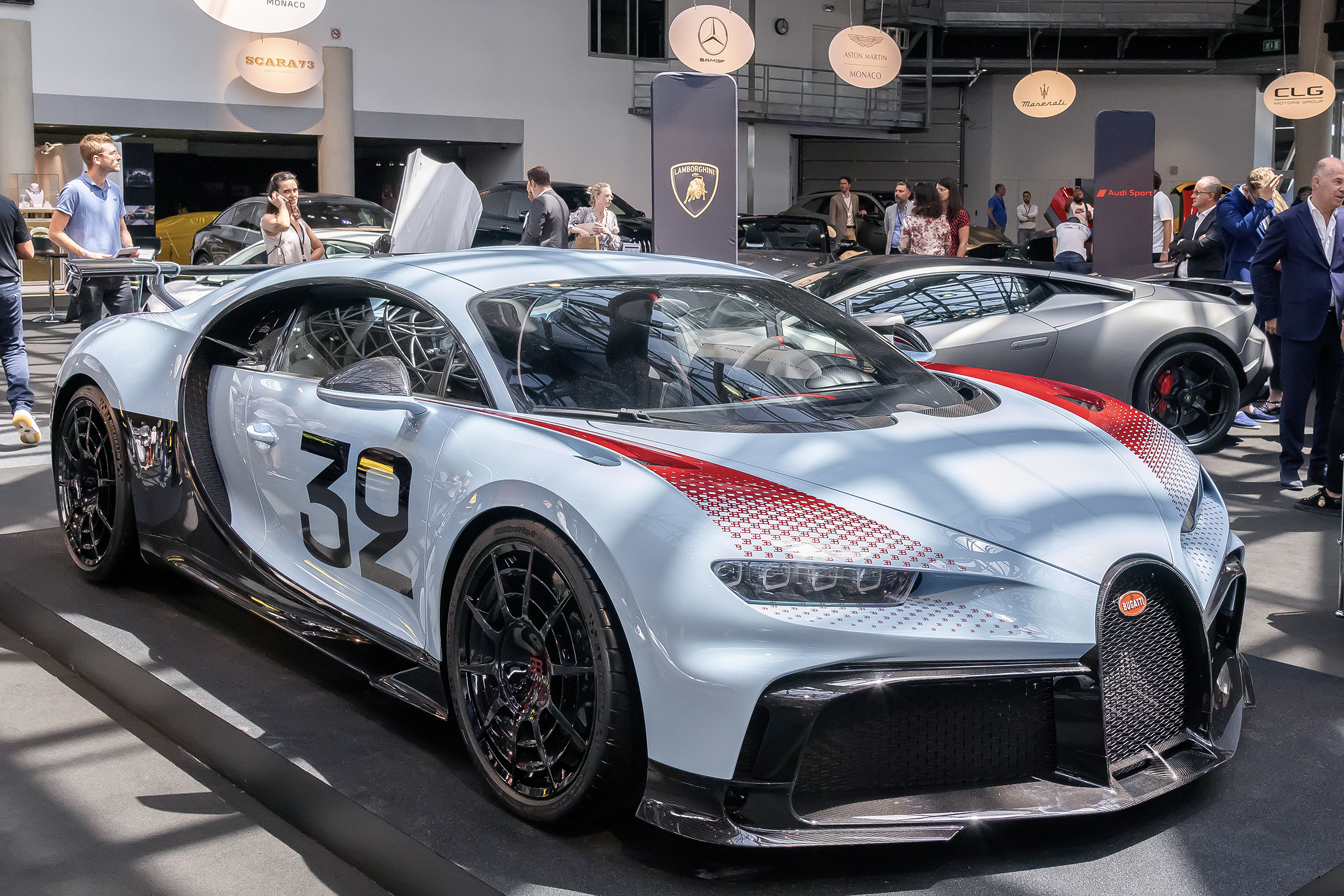
Chiron Pur Sport Grand Prix

The Chiron Pur Sport Grand Prix was announced in December 2021. It is the first project of Bugatti's new ‘Sur Mesure’ (meaning tailored in French) customization program, so it is a one-off car. In 1931, Louis Chiron won the French Grand Prix at Montlhéry in his Type 51 – an enhanced version of the legendary Type 35 – together with Achille Varzi. The number 32 was displayed in bold letters on their racing car and is now hand painted on the doors of the Chiron Pur Sport 'Grand Prix'. "EB" logo patterns are also hand painted in red on the front and rear fenders. Inside, the car features black leather and red Alcantara, embroidered "EB" pattern on the door panels and black anodized aluminum trim panels with silver logos.

=== Chiron Profilée (2022) ===
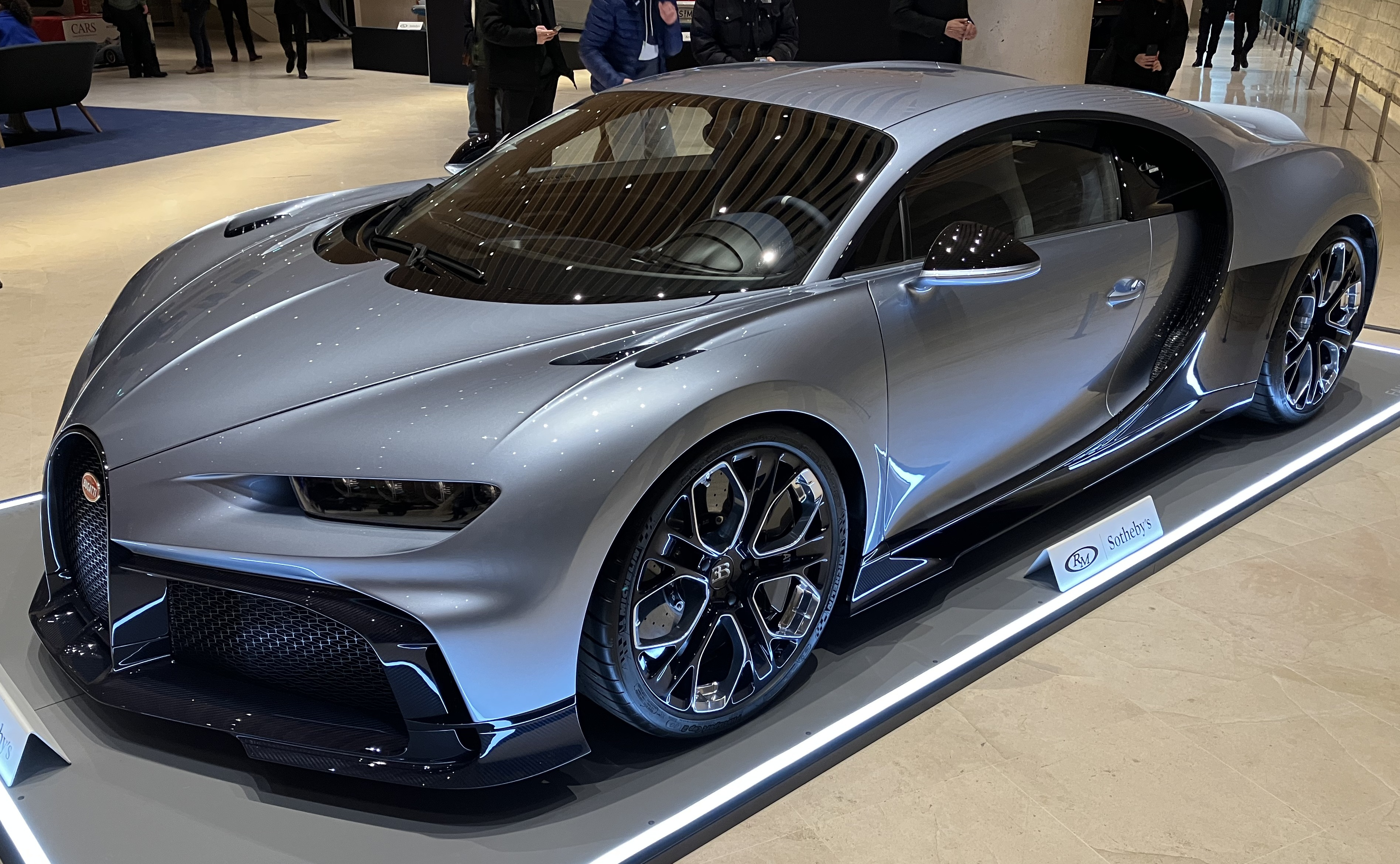

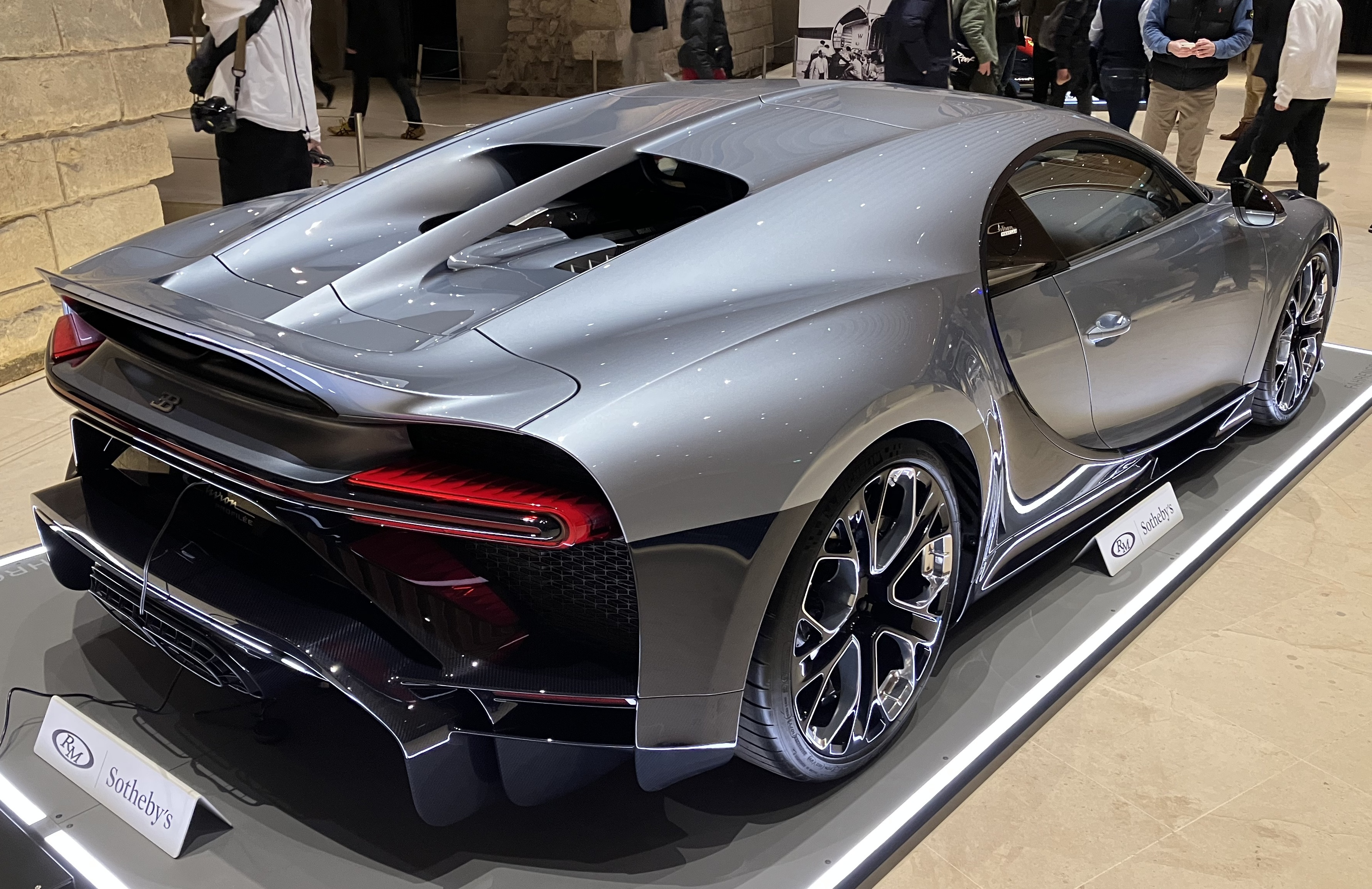
Chiron Profilée

The Chiron Profilée is a one-off special introduced in December 2022. It is based on the Chiron Pur Sport, but features a new aerodynamic profile characterized by wider air dams and a bigger grille up front, a redesigned front splitter, and a relatively small rear wing with a hollow middle section. Bugatti also made changes to the steering and suspension systems, and it gave the seven-speed, dual-clutch automatic transmission 15% shorter gear ratios. It is the fastest-accelerating car of the Chiron range with a 0–100 km/h (0–62 mph) of 2.3 seconds. 0–200 km/h (0–124 mph) takes 5.5 seconds and 0–300 km/h (0–186 mph) takes 12.4 seconds. It has a top speed of 380 km/h (236 mph). It's finished in silver (Argent Atlantique) and the bottom part of the car features bare carbon fiber that's tinted in blue (Bleu Royal Carbon). It is the first Chiron fitted with woven leather on the dashboard, the center console and the door panels.

Bugatti had planned to build 30 units, but as the production of its pre-series vehicle started, all 500 Chiron slots were already assigned. The project was cancelled and the car never entered production thus only one example was built and it is fully street-legal in European markets. On the 1 February 2023, the Profilée was sold at auction by RM Sotheby's for €9,792,500, with a percentage of the proceeds going to benefit charitable causes. At the time of its sale, it was believed to be the last street-legal W16-powered car Bugatti sold, as the Chiron and the Mistral were already sold-out.

== Other Bugatti based on the Chiron ==
=== La Voiture Noire (2019) ===
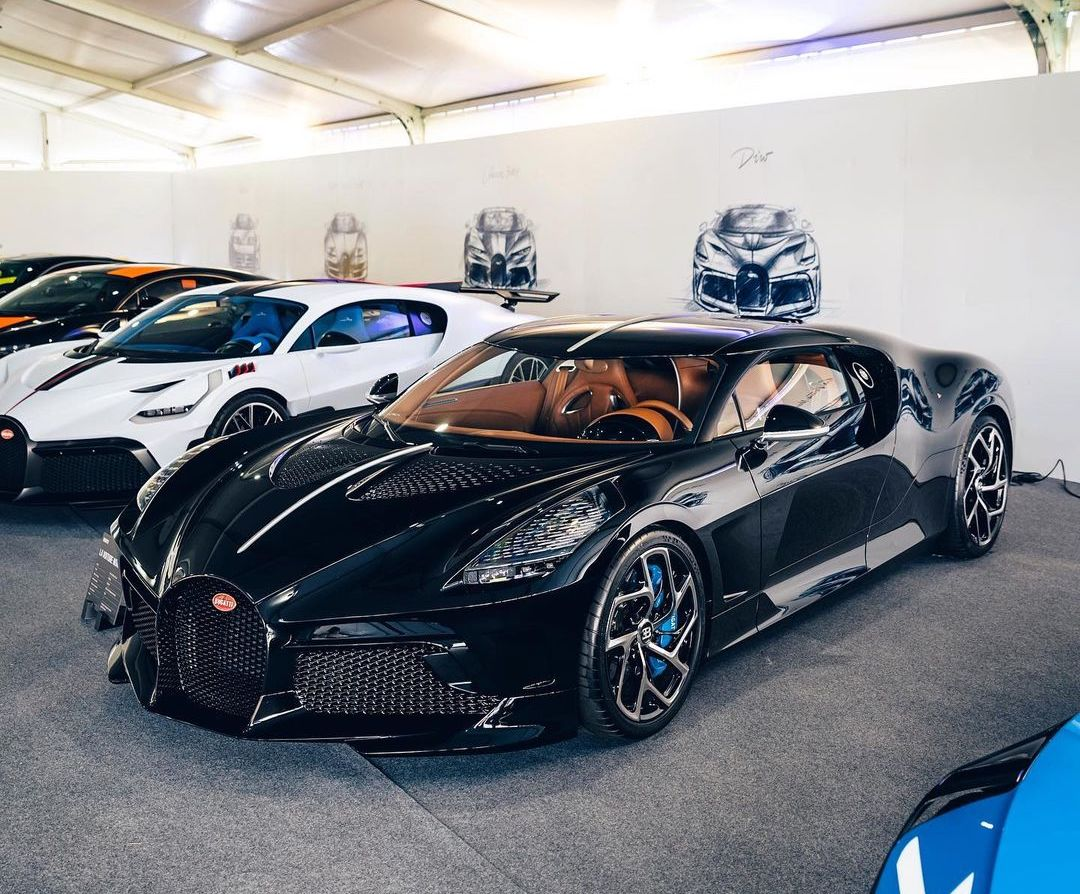
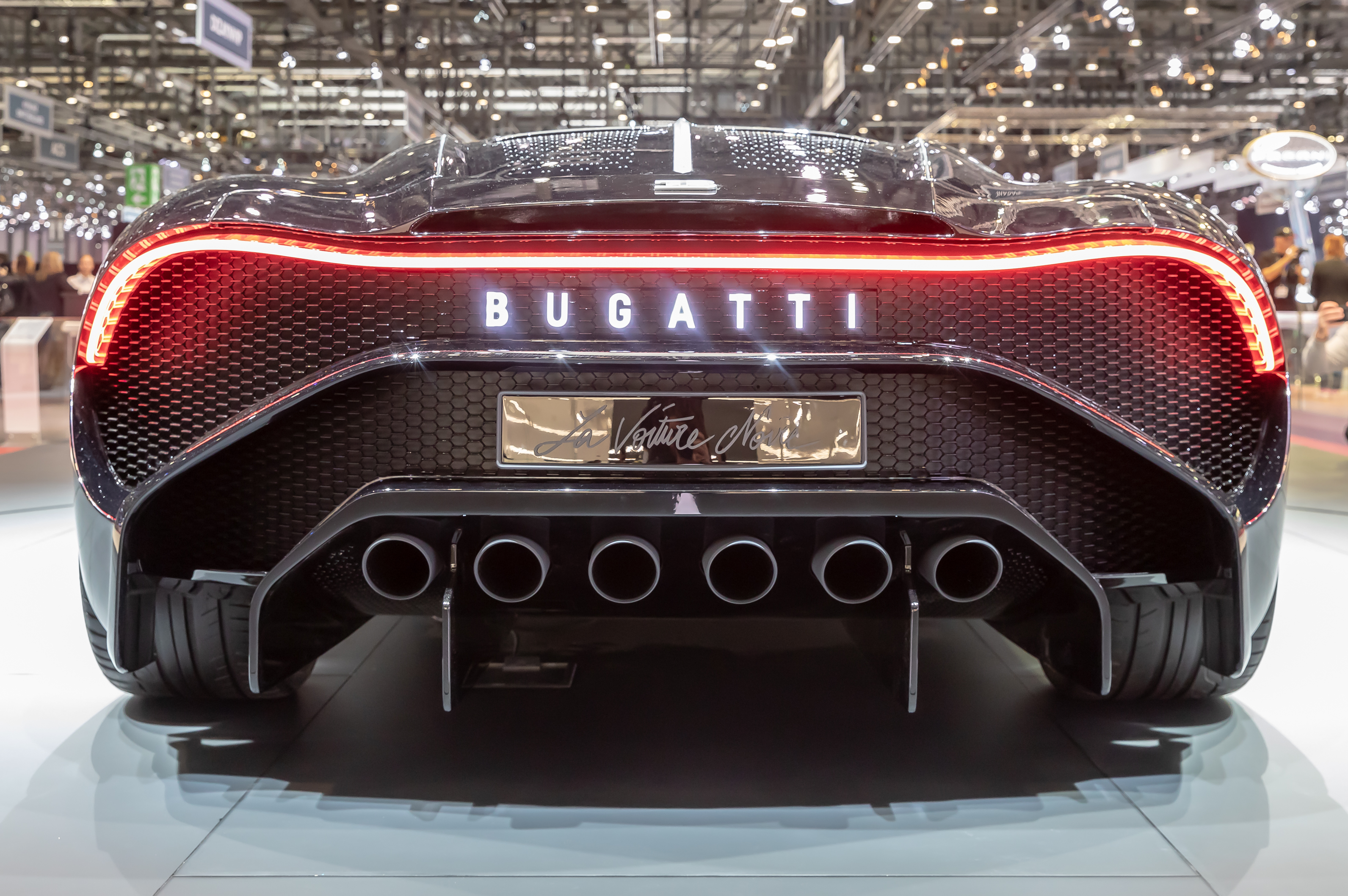
The Bugatti La Voiture Noire; note the six exhaust pipes at the rear of the car and the illuminated Bugatti lettering

The La Voiture Noire is a one-off special introduced at the 2019 Geneva Motor Show. Based on the Chiron, the design of the car harkens back to the Type 57 SC Atlantic and is a celebration of the company's distinctive design history. The car has a hand-built body made from carbon fibre designed by Bugatti designer Etienne Salomé which has an elongated nose (similar to that on the Divo) and an elongated back section. Other notable features include unique wing mirrors, LED taillight strip, and wheels. Unlike the original, the car has a mid-engine layout.

A trim piece running from the front of the car to the rear spoiler recalls the dorsal fin present on the Type 57 SC. The car features a floating windscreen and has masked A-pillars. The La Voiture Noire shares many design similarities with the Bugatti Rembrandt, a cancelled front-engine grand tourer powered by the Chiron's W16 engine.

The La Voiture Noire is powered by the same 8.0-litre quad-turbocharged W16 engine from the Chiron having the same power output figures but the 7-speed dual-clutch gearbox and the all-wheel-drive system are heavily revised in order to allow for a more relaxed driving experience. Softer dampers and a revised chassis contribute to the factor. The car features six exhaust pipes recalling the innovative design of the past.

Performance figures remain unknown but the company states that the car is likely to have lower top speed and acceleration times as compared to the Chiron due to its Grand Touring nature. The car sold for £9.5 million, which makes it one of the most expensive cars built to date.

A statement made later by the company confirmed that the car on display was a concept car and that the final product would take two and a half years more to complete. The show car had electric motors instead of an engine for easy maneuverability. Unlike the show car, the production La Voiture Noire features a Havana Brown leather interior and a fully functional drivetrain, powered by the Chiron’s W16 engine.

According to Exclusive Car Registry, La Voiture Noire is owned by a member of the Piëch family after Ferdinand Piëch, the man for whom it was originally commissioned, died before receiving it.

=== Bugatti F.K.P. Hommage (2026) ===
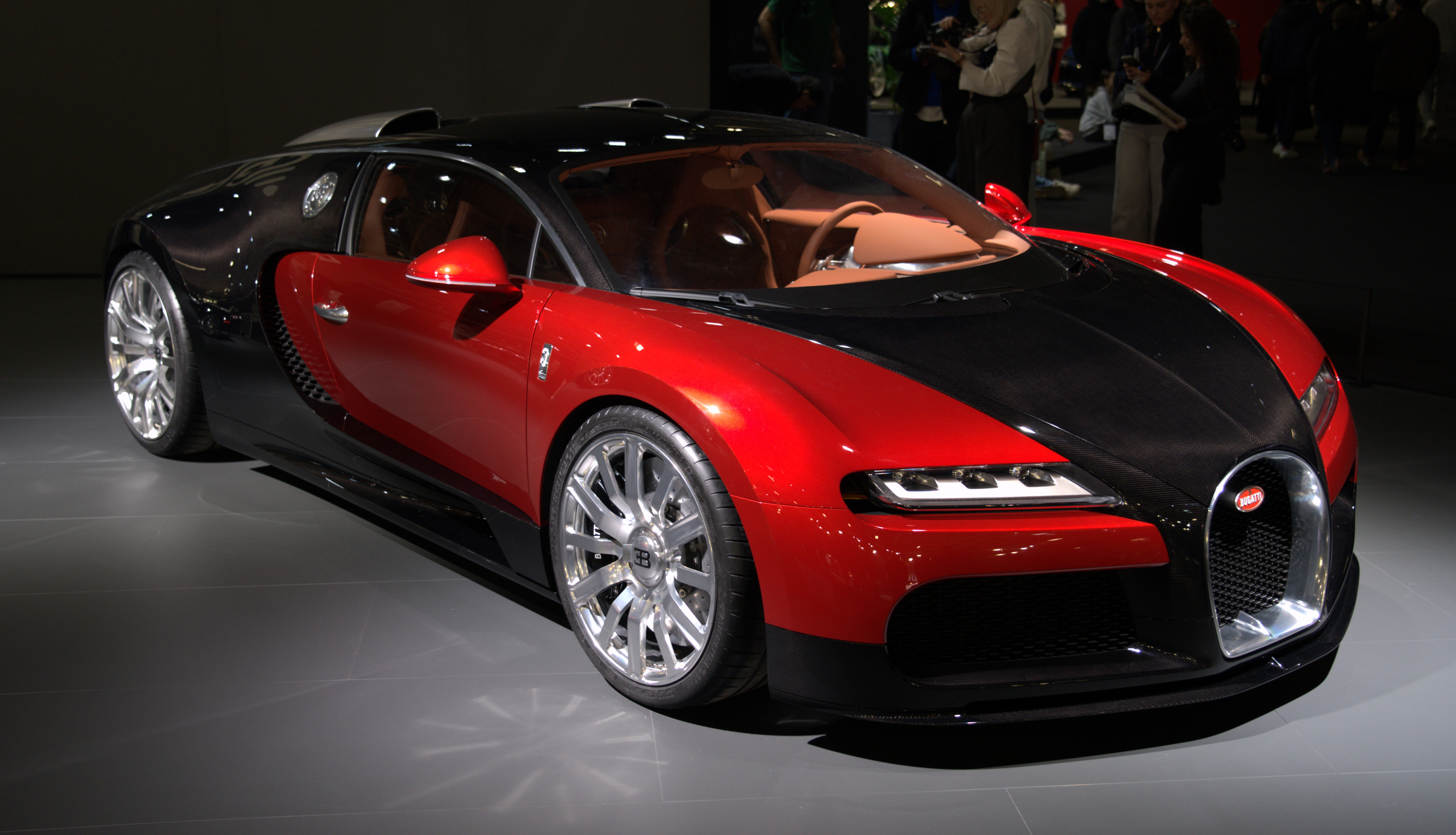
Bugatti F.K.P Hommage

The F.K.P. Hommage is a one-off special introduced in a press conference. Based on the Chiron, the design paid homage to the Bugatti Veyron honoring 20 years since its debut. The name is based on the initials Ferdinand Karl Piëch, former chairman of the executive board (Vorstandsvorsitzender) of the Volkswagen Group. This is the final car in Bugatti's lineup to have the W16 engine.

== Records ==
=== Acceleration and braking record ===
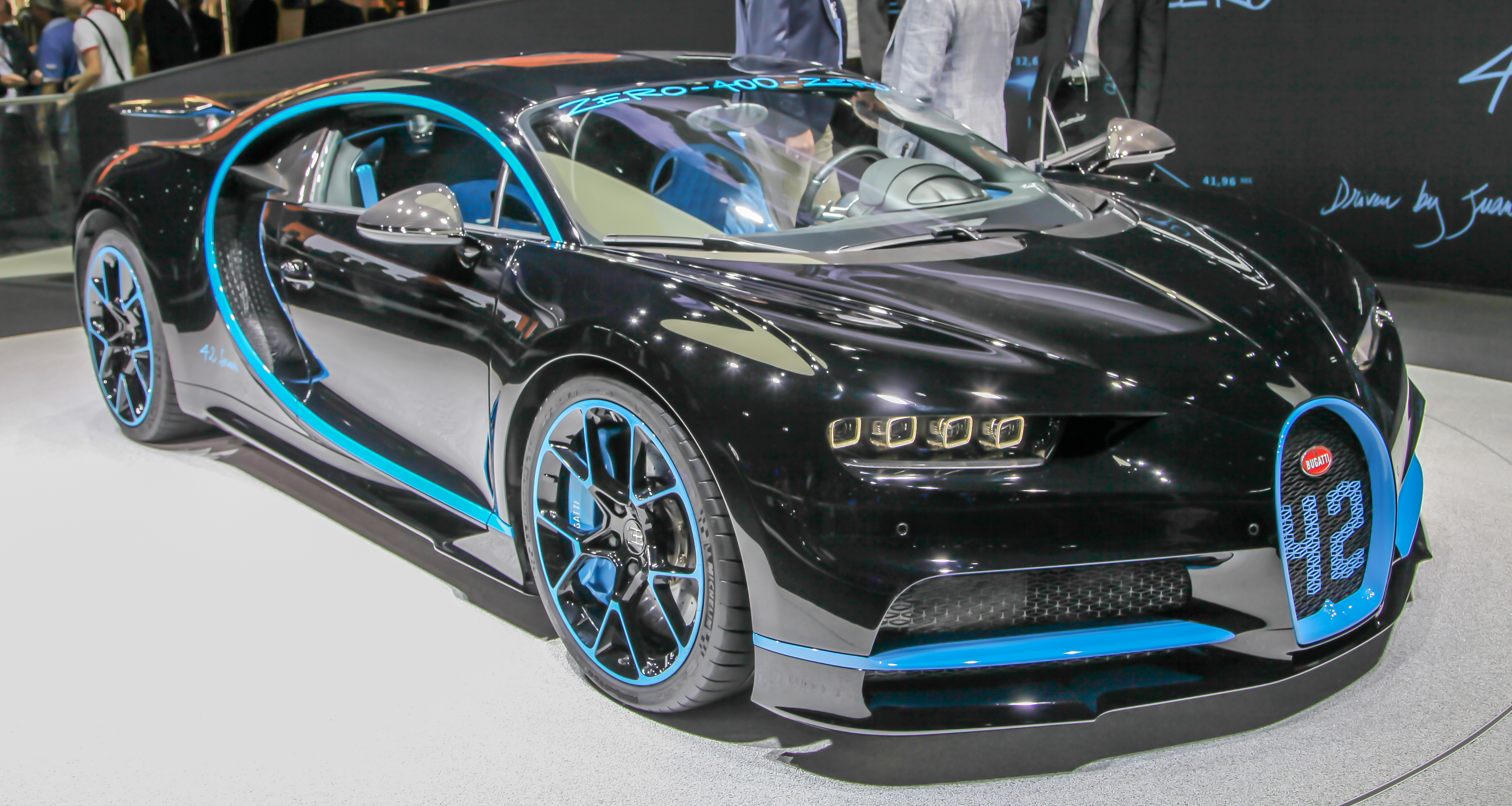
Bugatti Chiron 0-400-0

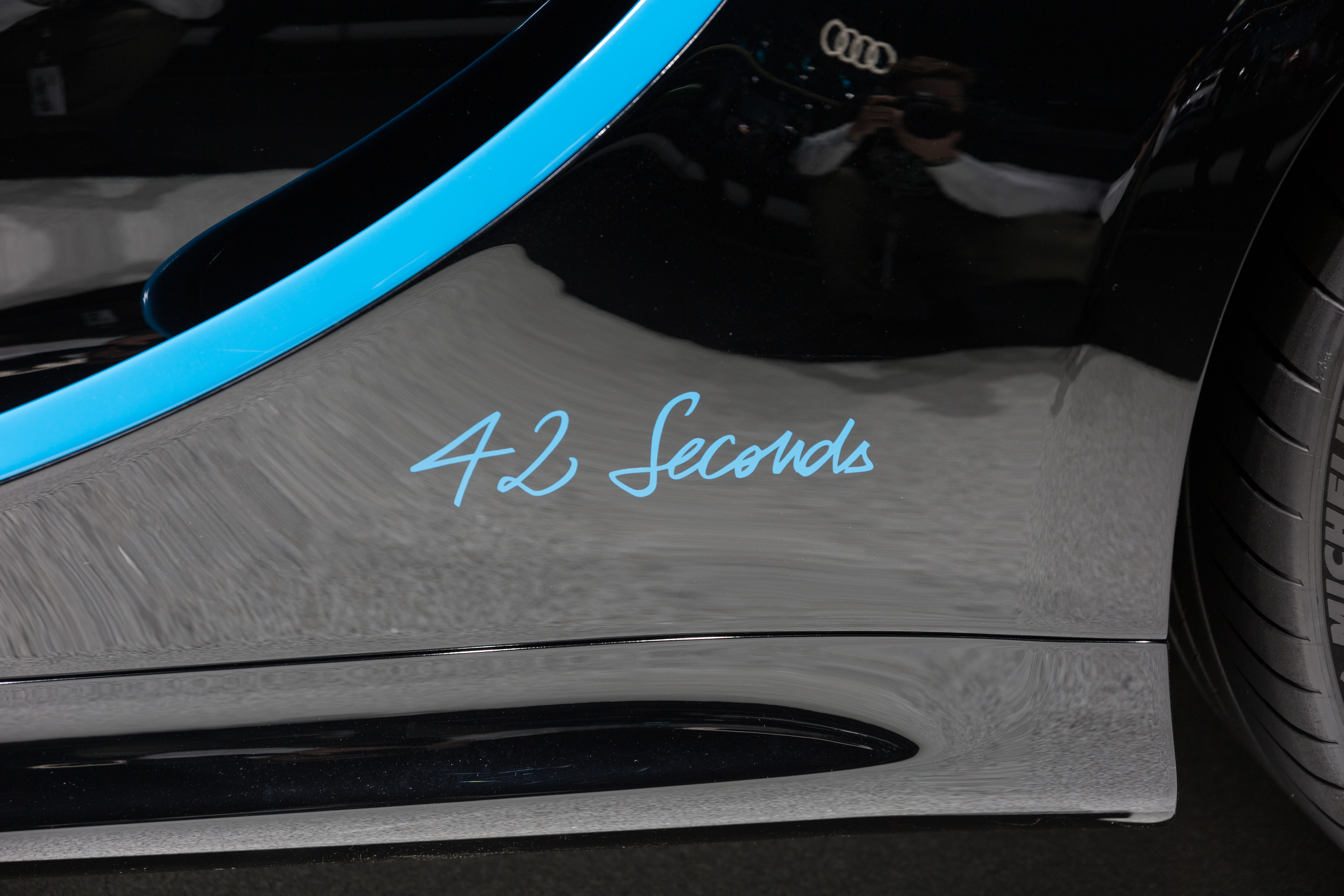
The time taken for the run on the side of the car

At the 2017 IAA show in Frankfurt, Bugatti announced that the Chiron broke the record of fastest 0–400–0 km/h (0–249–0 mph) acceleration time, completing it in 41.96 seconds in a span of 3.2 kilometres (2 miles) at the Ehra-Lessien high-speed oval on a weekend in August 2017. The car was driven by Colombian racing driver Juan Pablo Montoya.

Bugatti also added an extra livery to the Chiron on display to confirm that it was the same car that broke the 0–400–0 km/h (0–249–0 mph) record. During the show, Bugatti also mentioned that during the run, the car accelerated from 0–100 km/h (0–62 mph) in 2.4 seconds, 0–200 km/h (0–124 mph) in 6.1 seconds, 0–300 km/h (0–186 mph) in 13.1 seconds, and 0–400 km/h (0–248.5 mph) in 32.6 seconds, which altogether, also makes the Chiron faster than its predecessor, the Veyron.

The record has since been broken by the Koenigsegg Regera and other vehicles.

=== Top speed achievement ===
On 2 August 2019, Bugatti test driver Andy Wallace achieved a speed of 490.484 km/h (304.773 mph) in a pre-production Chiron Super Sport 300+ prototype at Volkswagen's test facility in Ehra-Lessien. The speed was verified by the TÜV, Germany's Technical Inspection Association. In its final production form, the Chiron SS 300+ has different seats, no roll-cage, standard ride height and an electronically limited top speed of 440 km/h (273.4 mph).

The car was developed under Bugatti head exterior designer Frank Heyl in collaboration with Italian automobile engineering firm Dallara and tyre manufacturer Michelin over the course of six months. The overall length of the car was increased by 248.9 mm (9.8 in) and it is fitted by a laser-controlled ride height system in order to reduce drag. To further reduce drag and aid aerodynamics, the electronically controlled rear wing was removed and was replaced with a long tail incorporating a rear wing with a short cross-section. A full roll cage was added for safety reasons, and the passenger seat was removed to make way for data recording equipment used to validate the record run. The car incorporates an exhaust system first introduced on the Bugatti Centodieci in order to further reduce aerodynamic drag. Mechanically, the engine was modified to generate 1,177 kW (1,578 hp; 1,600 PS) of power output with no changes to the gearbox and all-wheel-drive system.

== Production ==
Name	Units made
Chiron	~207
Chiron Sport	~60
Chiron Sport 110 Ans Bugatti	20
Chiron Super Sport 300+	30
Chiron Noire	20
Chiron L'Ébé	3
Chiron Pur Sport	60
Chiron Sport “Les Légendes du Ciel”	20
Chiron Super Sport	~80
Chiron Profilée	1
Total	501*

*The Chiron's production was limited to 500 units, but when the Profilée was announced in late 2022, the 500 units had already been commissioned, so the only Bugatti Chiron Profilée that Bugatti had built was auctioned off in early 2023, bringing the total of sold Bugatti Chirons to 501.

== Marketing ==
The Chiron was recreated in Lego as 2018's biennial Technic sports car. It was released on 1 June 2018 as a 1:8 scale model with 3,600 individual parts.

On 30 August 2018, Lego unveiled a working full-sized model of the Chiron. It was constructed almost entirely with Lego Technic elements (339 unique types, over 1,000,000 pieces in total) with exceptions for the Bugatti badge, the wheels, a steel frame, a steel roll cage, a steel drive chain and the seat belts. The engine was created from 2,304 Lego Power Function motors found in standard models; it was estimated to produce 4 kW (5.4 hp) and 92 N⋅m (68 lb⋅ft) of torque. The car was test driven by Andy Wallace, Bugatti's official test driver, at Volkswagen's Ehra-Lessien test track. Top speed is 20 km/h (12 mph).

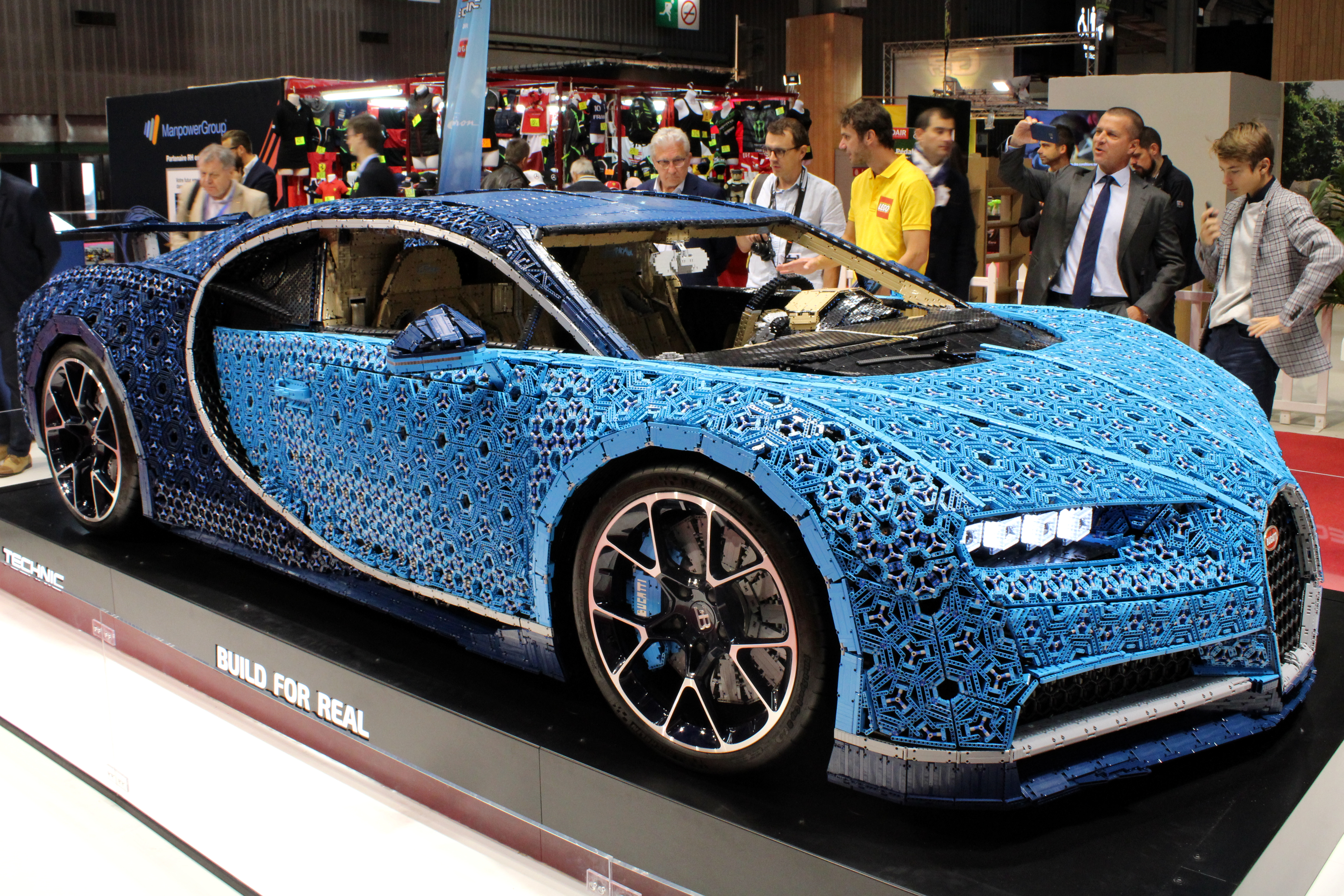
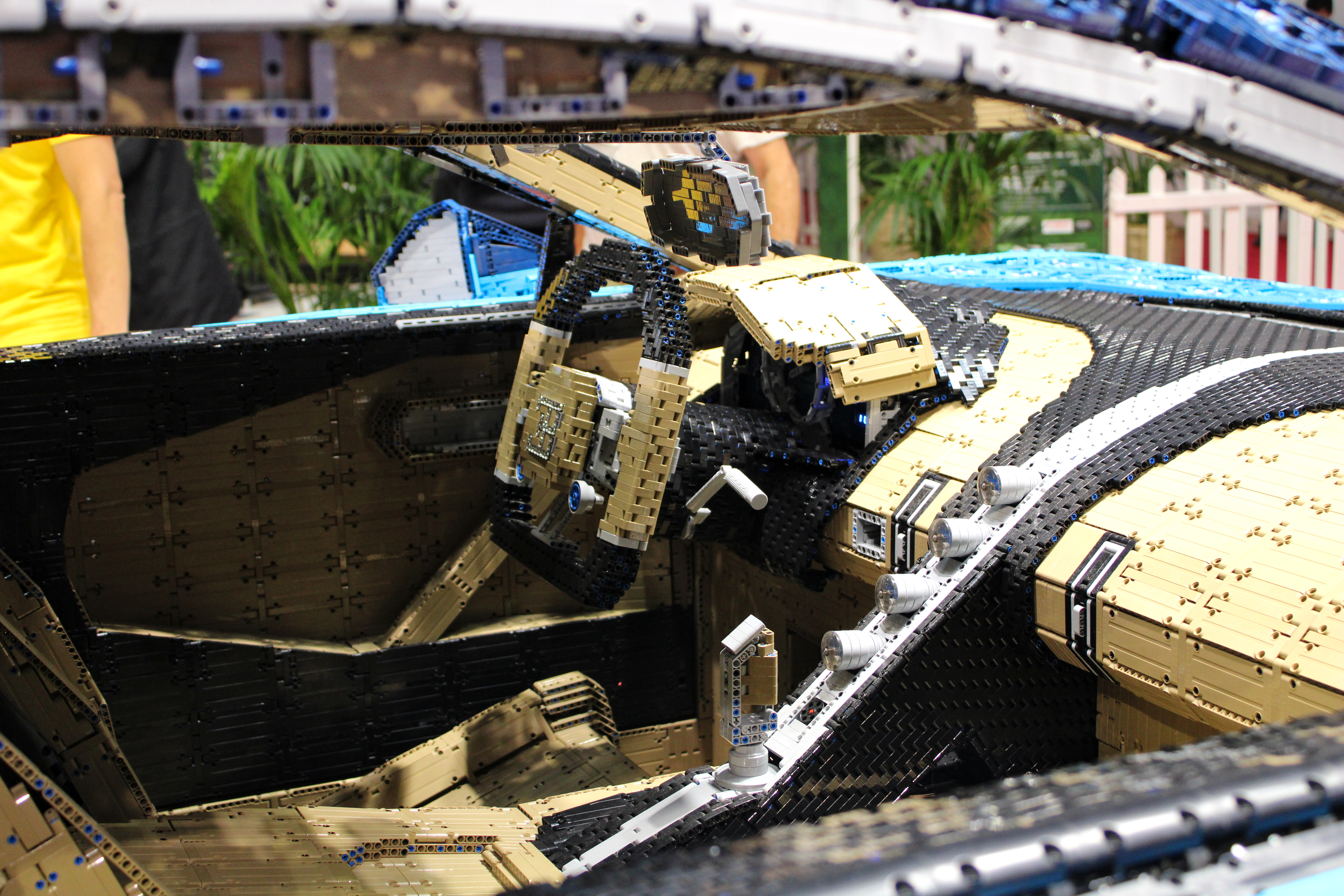

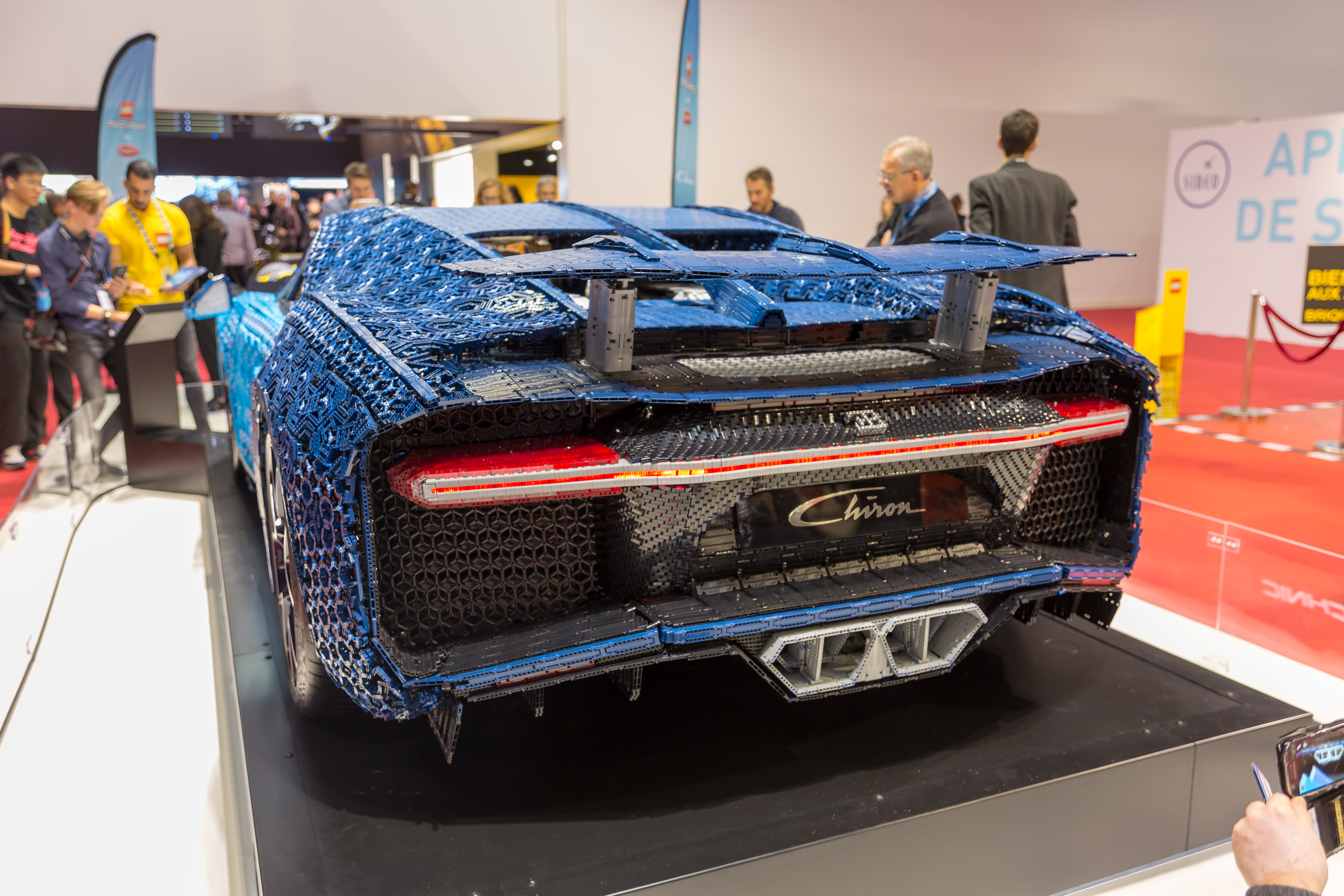
Full size Lego Chiron at the 2018 Paris Motor Show

== See also ==
- Bugatti Vision Gran Turismo
- Bugatti Divo
- Bugatti Centodieci
- List of production cars by power output
