= Diva (2025 film) =

2024 Croatian-Herzegovinian biographical movie

Diva is a 2025 Croatian feature biographical-historical film about Diva Grabovčeva, directed by Branko Perić, based on a screenplay by his wife Mara Perić.

The film was screened on 17 May 2025 as part of the Marché du Film in Cannes, while it will have its world premiere in Mostar, on 18 September 2025. Distribution on the Amazon Prime platform is also planned.

== Cast ==
- Ornela Vištica as Diva Grabovčeva
- Luka Mamuza as Tahir-bey Kopčić
- Mugdim Avdagić as Džafer-bey
- Mladen Vulić as Arslan Aga
- Valentin Perković as Dr. Ćiro Truhelka

== Production ==
It was recorded in the production of SP Film Production from Tomislavgrad

Filming was supported by the Federal Cinematography Foundation and the Central State Office for Croats outside the Republic of Croatia.
