= Diva Grabovčeva =

Martyr in Bosnian Catholic folklore (died c. 1680)

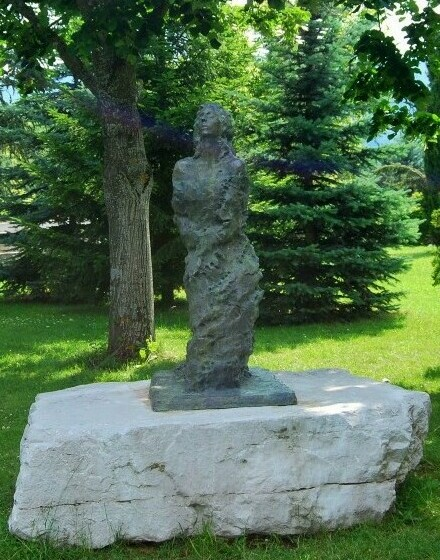
- One of Diva Grabovčeva statues

Folk tale
- Name: Diva Grabovčeva
- Mythology: Legend
- Country: Bosnia and Herzegovina
- Origin Date: 17th century

Diva Grabovčeva (born in Rumboci – died c. 1680, Kedžara) is a legendary figure in the folklore of Bosnian Catholic people, portrayed as a virgin martyr.

== Narrative ==
According to the local oral tradition, she was born in the village of Rumboci, in Prozor-Rama, between two historical regions of Bosnia and Herzegovina, at the boundary of southern Bosnia and northern Herzegovina. In a legend Diva Grabovčeva refused to marry outside of her religion and refused the local Ottoman nobleman's marriage proposal, ran away from her home and hid in the Kedžara area. The young man found her and, in a moment of rage, killed her. At the beginning of the 20th century, the archaeologist Ćiro Truhelka found mortal remains in a grave at Kedžara, which he claimed belonged to a young girl, and associated it with the legend, claiming that it could be Diva Grabovčeva.

== Perception ==
Although Diva was neither recorded in chronicles of the Franciscan friary, Šćit in Prozor-Rama, nor its martyrology, she became a symbol of virginity, and the grave marked by Truhelka a pilgrimage site, which the local Catholics used in a usually very intimate, a private, rite of sacramental oath or sacramentum. In modern times, she is memorialized particularly among Bosnian Croats.

Ivan Markešić, Bosnian Croat sociologist and Christian theologian, critically assessed current perception of the myth, questioning a narrative's very public celebration from the 1990s onward, and a potential for political abuse and excessive glorification of the time past in relation to present, especially as a means of otherization.

== In popular culture ==
The author of Diva Grabovčeva statue is the well known sculptor Kuzma Kovačić.

She is also the subject of the song "Diva Grabovčeva" (2006) by Croatian musician Marko Perković Thompson.

A biographical film about Diva Grabovčeva, titled Diva and directed by Branko Perić, was released in 2025.

== See also ==
- Nora of Kelmendi
