= List of Volkswagen Group petrol engines =

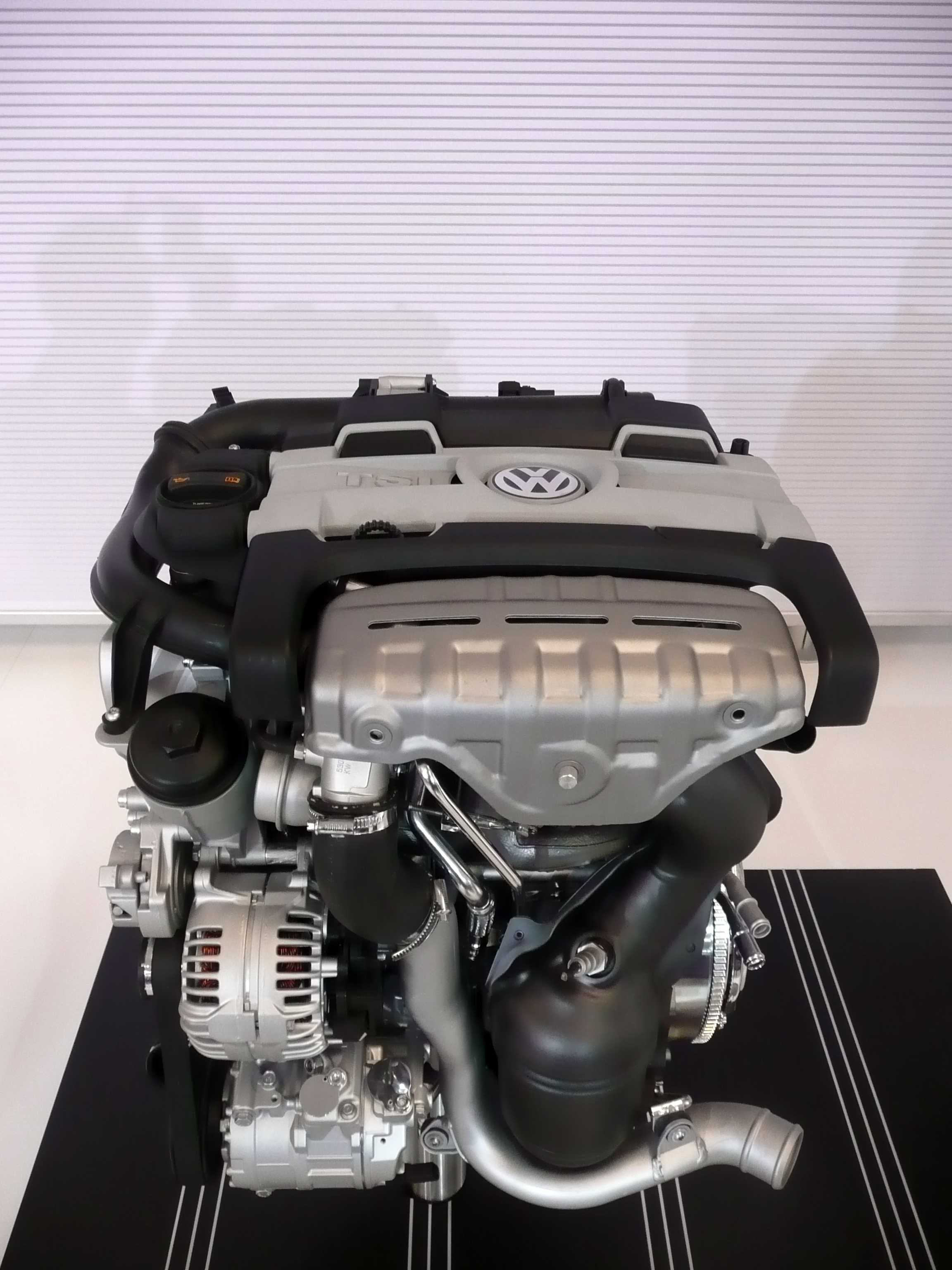
Volkswagen TSI engine

The spark-ignition petrol engines listed below operate on the four-stroke cycle, and are water-cooled.

Since the Volkswagen Group is German, official internal combustion engine performance ratings are published using the International System of Units (commonly abbreviated "SI"), a modern form of the metric system of figures. Motor vehicle engines will have been tested by a Deutsches Institut für Normung (DIN) accredited testing facility, to either the original 80/1269/EEC, or the later 1999/99/EC standards. The standard initial measuring unit for establishing the rated motive power output is the kilowatt (kW); and in their official literature, the power rating may be published in either the kW, or the metric horsepower (often abbreviated "PS" for the German word Pferdestärke), or both, and may also include conversions to imperial units such as the horsepower (hp) or brake horsepower (bhp). (Conversions: one PS = 735.5 watts (W); ˜ 0.98632 hp (SAE)). In case of conflict, the metric power figure of kilowatts (kW) will be stated as the primary figure of reference. For the turning force generated by the engine, the Newton metre (Nm) will be the reference figure of torque. Furthermore, in accordance with European automotive traditions, engines shall be listed in the following ascending order of preference:

1. Number of cylinders,
2. Engine displacement (in litres),
3. Engine configuration, and
4. Rated motive power output (in kilowatts).

The petrol engines which Volkswagen Group previously manufactured and installed are in the list of discontinued Volkswagen Group petrol engines article.

== Nomenclature ==
Both vehicle and engine platforms developed by Volkswagen are specified internally as an Entwicklungsauftrag ("EA"), or development assignment. The numbers denoting a particular Entwicklungsauftrag don't follow a strictly chronological scheme but have generally increased over time.

== EA211 R3/R4 ==
The EA211 engines are a completely new four-cylinder turbocharged and direct-injection TSI engines. Compared to its predecessor, the EA211 series is significantly more compact, with installation length 50 mm (2.0 in) shorter, thus offering more interior space. The installation position of the engines has also been optimised. Just as in the diesels, the petrol engines are now mounted with the exhaust side facing backwards and tilted at an angle of 12 degrees. The weight of these petrol engines made of die-cast aluminium is only 97 kg (214 lb) for the 1.2 TSI and 106 kg (234 lb) for the 1.4 TSI. The crankshaft alone became lighter by 20 per cent; the connecting rods lost 30 per cent of their weight. In addition the connecting rod bearing journals are now hollow-drilled and pistons now come with flat bottoms, all of them optimized for lower weight. Regarding thermal management, the EA211 petrol engine is equipped with a modern dual-circuit cooling system. That means that a high temperature circuit with a mechanically driven cooling pump cools the basic engine, while a low temperature circuit flows through the intercooler and the turbo-charger casing. The cylinder-head circuit heats the cabin's interior. The exhaust manifold is integrated into the cylinder head, enabling the engine to warm up more quickly, in turn making heat available quickly for the passenger cabin. At high loads, the exhaust is cooled by the coolant, lowering fuel consumption.

=== 1.0 R3 inline-three 12v ===
The new fuel-saving engine presented at the 2012 Geneva Motor Show

identification
parts code prefix: 04E, ID code: CHYA, CHYB, CHZD, CPGA, CSEB, DHSB
engine displacement & engine configuration
1.0 L (999 cc) inline three engine (R3/I3); bore x stroke: 74.5 mm × 76.4 mm (2.93 in × 3.01 in), bore spacing: 82 mm (3.2 in), stroke ratio: 0.99:1 – 'square engine', 333.1 cc (20.33 cu in) cylinder, compression ratio: 10.5:1 (11.5:1 for CNG version)
cylinder block & crankcase
cast aluminium alloy; four main bearings, die-forged steel crankshaft
cylinder head & valvetrain
cast aluminium alloy; four valves per cylinder, 12 valves total, double overhead camshaft (DOHC)
aspiration
natural and turbocharged
fuel system
multi-point electronic indirect fuel injection with three intake manifold-sited fuel injectors
DIN-rated motive power & torque outputs
44 kW (60 PS; 59 bhp) at 5,000 rpm; 95 N⋅m (70 lb⋅ft) at 3,000–4,250 rpm (CHYA)
55 kW (75 PS; 74 bhp) at 6,200 rpm; 95 N⋅m (70 lb⋅ft) at 3,000–4,250 rpm (CHYB)
50 kW (68 PS; 67 bhp) at 6,200 rpm; 90 N⋅m (66 lb⋅ft) at 3,000–4,250 rpm with CNG (CPGA)
62 kW (84 PS; 83 bhp) at 6,350 rpm; 102 N⋅m (75 lb⋅ft) at 3,000 rpm with Ethanol (CSEB)
70 kW (95 PS; 94 bhp) at 5,000–5,500 rpm; 160 N⋅m (118 lb⋅ft) at 1500–3,500 rpm (CHZB)
85 kW (116 PS; 114 bhp) at 5,000–5,500 rpm; 200 N⋅m (148 lb⋅ft) at 2000–3,500 rpm (CHZD)
94 kW (128 PS; 126 bhp) at 5,500 rpm; 200 N⋅m (148 lb⋅ft) at 2,000–3,500 rpm with Ethanol (DHSB)
application
Volkswagen up!, Skoda Citigo, Škoda Fabia III, Seat Mii, Seat Ibiza (5th Gen), Seat Arona, Volkswagen Golf VII, Volkswagen Polo, Volkswagen T-Roc, Volkswagen T-Cross, Audi A1 (GB), SEAT León (4th Gen)

=== 1.2 R4 inline-four TSI ===
Main article - Volkswagen_EA211_engine These newly developed generation of modern petrol engines are manufactured at the Škoda Auto plant in Mladá Boleslav.

identification
EA211 engine family. Turbocharged and direct-injection TSI engines with a four-cylinder, four-valve layout and belt driven camshafts.
1.2 TSI 66 kW
The entry-level petrol engine. Turbocharging produces a maximum torque of 160 Nm (at 1,400 to 3,500 rpm).
1.2 TSI 77 kW
The improved performance version of the 1.2 TSI Green tec, which includes a start/stop system and brake energy recuperation, manages an output of 77 kW (105 hp). This TSI engine provides a maximum torque of 175 Nm at between 1,400 and 4,000 rpm.

=== 1.4 TSI ===
For 2012, these newly developed generation of modern petrol engines are manufactured at the Škoda Auto plant in Mladá Boleslav.

identification
parts code prefix: 04E
description
1.4 TFSI Green tec engine with 110 kW (140 hp). This engine achieves its maximum torque of 250 Nm at 1,500 to 3,500 rpm.

In North American market it is referred to as CZTA type engine (150 hp). In Chilean market it is referred to as CHPA type engine (140 hp) or CZDA type engine (150 hp).

New lightweight aluminum construction, an integrated (into the head) exhaust manifold, and a toothed-belt drive for its double overhead camshaft valvetrain that incorporates variable intake and exhaust timing. The only aspect to be carried over from the EA111 engine that preceded it is the 82 mm cylinder spacing. The cylinder bore was decreased by 2 mm (to 74.5mm) while the stroke was increased to 80mm, a change which helps compactness, increases torque, and is ideal for adding boost.

DIN-rated motive power & torque outputs, ID codes
90 kW (122 PS; 121 bhp) at 5,000 rpm; 200 N⋅m (148 lbf⋅ft) at 1,500–4,000 rpm — CMBA, CPVA
92 kW (125 PS; 123 bhp) at 5,000 rpm; 200 N⋅m (148 lbf⋅ft) at 1,500–4,000 rpm — CZCA, CPVB
103 kW (140 PS; 138 bhp) at 5,000 rpm; 250 N⋅m (184 lbf⋅ft) at 1,500–4,000 rpm — CHPA, CPTA (CPTA engine is a CHPA engine with automatic #2 and #3 cylinders deactivation system known as ACT - Active Cylinder Technology)
110 kW (150 PS; 148 bhp) at 5,000 rpm; 250 N⋅m (184 lbf⋅ft) at 1,500–4,000 rpm — CZDA, CZEA, CZTA (CZEA engine also uses the ACT system)

=== 1.5 TSI (EA211 Evo) ===
identification
parts code prefix: 05E
description
1.5 TSI/TFSI engine

DIN-rated motive power & torque outputs, ID codes
96 kW (131 PS; 129 bhp) at 5,000 rpm; 200–220 N⋅m (148–162 lbf⋅ft) at 1,400–3,500 rpm — DACA-non GPF, DACB-non-GPF, DPBA-GPF, DPBE-GPF -kangaroo (low torque when cold) because of catalyst pre-heating with lean mixture and extreme retard spark.
110 kW (150 PS; 148 bhp) at 5,000 rpm; 250 N⋅m (184 lbf⋅ft) at 1,500–3,500 rpm — DADA-non GPF, GPF after 2018, DPCA-GPF, both engines have ACT, -kangaroo (low torque when cold) because of catalyst pre-heating with lean mixture and extreme retard spark.
- DXDB-evo2; no kangaroo because is using 2nd air injection for catalyst pre-heating and normal air-fuel mixture.
110 kW (150 PS; 148 bhp) at 5,000 rpm; 250 N⋅m (184 lbf⋅ft) at 1,500–4000 rpm
- DNKA-evo2; no kangaroo because is using 2nd air injection for catalyst pre-heating and normal air-fuel mixture.
118 KW (160 PS; 158 bhp) at 5,500 rpm; 250 Nm at 1750–3500 rpm
- DFYA - evo1- with mild hybrid

== EA113/EA827 R4 ==
The EA827 family of internal combustion engines was initially developed by Audi under Ludwig Kraus leadership and introduced in 1972 in the Audi 80, and was eventually superseded by the EA113 evolution introduced in 1993. Both share the same 88 mm (3.46 in) cylinder spacing. The latter EA113 was updated with Fuel Stratified Injection (FSI) direct injection, to be topped by the 200 kW (272 PS; 268 bhp) 2.0 TFSI used in the Audi TTS. Forty million engines have been produced. This range will eventually be superseded by the evolved version with heavy changes EA888 project, introduced with the 1.8 TSI/TFSI below, but the EA113 still remains in production.

=== 1.4 R4 16v TSI/TFSI ===
Based on the EA111, this new engine was announced at the 2005 Frankfurt Motor Show, to be first used in the Mk5 Golf GT, the 125 kW 1.4-litre TSI engine is a "Twincharger", and uses both a turbocharger and a supercharger. Its displacement downsizing leads to improved fuel economy, with 14% more power than the 2.0 FSI, but consuming 5% less fuel. The mechanical supercharger compressor, driven at 5 times the speed of the crankshaft, mainly operates at low engine speeds from idle up to 2,400 revolutions per minute (rpm) to increase low-end torque. At engine speeds just above idle, the belt-driven supercharger provides a boost pressure of 1.75 bar (25.4 psi). The turbocharger assumes full effectiveness at middle revs, and the engine map disengages the clutch-controlled supercharger at a maximum upper limit of 3,500 rpm; the supercharger will then be bypassed once the turbocharger spools up and reaches sufficient speed to provide adequate boost in the upper rev-ranges. This engine is made at Volkswagen-Motorenfertigung, Chemnitz.

In 2007, Volkswagen announced the 90 kW model which will replace the 1.6 FSI 85 kW (116 PS; 114 bhp) engine. This engine differs from the 103 kW and 125 kW models in several ways. It uses only one method of forced induction – a turbocharger (and not a supercharger), and has water-cooled intercooler. The engine has reduced frictional losses, optimised camshafts, new intake ports, and new high-pressure injector valves. It is also 14 kg (31 lb) lighter than the 125 kW model, in order to improve fuel economy and reduce emissions.

identification
parts code prefix: 03C, ID codes: BLG, BMY, CAXC
engine displacement & engine configuration
1,390 cc (84.8 cu in) inline-four engine (R4/I4); bore x stroke: 76.5 mm × 75.6 mm (3.01 in × 2.98 in), stroke ratio: 1.01:1 – 'square engine', 347.5 cc per cylinder, 120 bar (1,740 psi) peak pressures, compression ratio: 10.0:1
cylinder block & crankcase
grey cast iron; 82 mm (3.23 in) cylinder spacing, five main bearings, die-forged steel crankshaft, roller chain-driven oil pump
cylinder head & valvetrain
cast aluminium alloy; four valves per cylinder, 16 valves total, low-friction roller finger cam followers with automatic hydraulic valve clearance compensation, roller chain driven double overhead camshaft (DOHC), continuous adjusting variable intake valve timing
aspiration
hot-film air mass meter, cast alloy throttle body with electronically controlled Bosch "E-Gas" throttle valve
90 to 96 kW variants — two-part plastic intake manifold, turbocharger incorporated in exhaust manifold with maximum boost pressure 1.8 bar (26.1 psi), water-cooled intercooler integrated into intake manifold
103 to 125 kW variants — multi-ribbed belt-driven fifth-generation Eaton Roots-type positive displacement supercharger operated by a magnetic clutch integrated in a module inside the water pump, internal step-down ratio on the input end of the synchronisation gear pair, and KKK turbocharger with integrated wastegate connected in series, administrated by a control flap, 2.5 bar (36.3 psi) pressure at 1,500 rpm, front-mounted intercooler (FMIC)
fuel system
fully demand-controlled and returnless; – fuel tank–mounted low-pressure fuel pump; Fuel Stratified Injection (FSI): camshaft-driven single-piston high-pressure injection pump supplying up to 150 bar (2,180 psi) fuel pressure in common rail fuel rail integrated into the inlet manifold, four combustion chamber sited direct injection sequential solenoid-controlled six-hole fuel injectors, mounted on the intake side between the intake port and cylinder head seal level, homogeneous mixing, stratified lean-burn operation with excess air at part load,
90 to 103 kW variants — 95 RON ultra-low sulphur unleaded petrol (ULSP)
110 to 125 kW variants — 98 RON 'Super Unleaded' ultra-low sulphur unleaded petrol (ULSP) – 95 RON may be used, but will result in lower power output
ignition system & engine management
centrally positioned NGK longlife spark plugs, mapped direct ignition with four individual direct-acting single spark coils; Bosch Motronic ME electronic engine control unit (ECU), knock control via a single knock sensor, permanent lambda control
exhaust system
cast iron exhaust manifold (with integrated turbocharger), one catalytic converter, two heated oxygen sensors monitoring pre- and post catalyst exhaust gases
DIN-rated motive power & torque outputs, ID codes
90 kW (122 PS; 121 bhp); 210 N⋅m (155 lbf⋅ft) at 1,500–4,000 rpm — Passat (2009 on)
90 kW (122 PS; 121 bhp); 200 N⋅m (148 lbf⋅ft) at 1,500–3,500 rpm — CAXA; Golf Mk5 (2007 on), Tiguan (08/10->), Škoda Octavia Mk2, Škoda Yeti, Scirocco Mk3, Audi A1, Audi A3 Mk3
92 kW (125 PS; 123 bhp); 200 N⋅m (148 lbf⋅ft) at 1,500–4,000 rpm — CAXC; Audi A3, SEAT Leon
96 kW (131 PS; 129 bhp); 220 N⋅m (160 lbf⋅ft) at 1,750–3,500 rpm — CFBA; Golf Mk6, VW Jetta V, Passat B6, Škoda Octavia Mk2, LAVIDA(SAIC-VW), Bora
103 kW (140 PS; 138 bhp); 220 N⋅m (162 lbf⋅ft) — BMY; Touran from early 2006, Golf Mk5, Jetta
110 kW (150 PS; 148 bhp) at 5,800 rpm; 220 N⋅m (162 lbf⋅ft) at 1,250–4,500 rpm — CAVF/CTHF; SEAT Ibiza FR
110 kW (150 PS; 148 bhp) at 5,800 rpm; 240 N⋅m (177 lbf⋅ft) at 1,750–4,000 rpm — BWK/CAVA; VW Tiguan; VW Sharan Mk2
110 kW (150 PS; 148 bhp) at 5,800 rpm; 240 N⋅m (177 lbf⋅ft) at 1,750–4,000 rpm — CDGA; Touran, Passat B7 EcoFuel
118 kW (160 PS; 158 bhp) at 5,800 rpm; 240 N⋅m (177 lbf⋅ft) at 1,750–4,500 rpm — CAVD; Golf Mk5, Golf Mk6, Tiguan, Scirocco Mk3, VW Jetta TSI Sport
118 kW (160 PS; 158 bhp) at 5,800 rpm; 240 N⋅m (177 lbf⋅ft) at 1,750–4,500 rpm — CTHD; (Updated CAVD for 2013 Models)
125 kW (170 PS; 168 bhp) at 6,000 rpm; 240 N⋅m (177 lbf⋅ft) (MEP 21.7 bar) at 1,750–4,500 rpm (200 N⋅m (148 lbf⋅ft) at 1,250–6,000 rpm), rev limit: 7,000 rpm — BLG; Golf Mk5 GT, Jetta, Golf Plus, Touran
132 kW (179 PS; 177 bhp) at 6,200 rpm; 250 N⋅m (184 lbf⋅ft) at 2,000 – 4,500 rpm — CAVE/CTHE; SEAT Ibiza Cupra, Polo GTI, Fabia RS
136 kW (185 PS; 182 bhp) at 6,200 rpm; 250 N⋅m (184 lbf⋅ft) at 2,000 – 4,500 rpm — CAVG/CTHG; Audi A1
applications
2005 VW Golf Mk5, 2006 VW Touran, 2008 Audi A3, 2008 VW Scirocco, possibly in the 2008 VW Concept R, 2007 SEAT León, 2008 Škoda Octavia, 2009 VW Tiguan, 2009 VW Golf Mk6
references
"Volkswagen Golf GT TSI – Supercharged and Turbocharged 1.4L". VWVortex.com. Volkswagen AG. 29 August 2005. Archived from the original on 25 February 2008.
"In a nutshell: Engine Technology 2006". Volkswagen-Media-Services.com (Press release). Volkswagen AG. 16 March 2006. Archived from the original on 1 November 2007.
"To the Point: TSI Offensive" (Press release). Volkswagen AG. 29 May 2007. Archived from the original on 3 July 2007.
"New VW 122 PS TSI Engine in detail". WorldCarFans.com. Volkswagen AG. 29 May 2007.
Parks, Jim (10 July 2009). "Eaton Supercharger Boosts VW Green Engine Of The Year". Eaton.com. Eaton Corporation. "The highly regarded engine was named International Engine of the Year, Best Engine in the 1-litre to 1.4-litre category, and Green Engine of the Year, ahead of state-of-the-art hybrid and twin-turbo diesel competition."

==== Awards ====
Was winner of the "Best New Engine" category in the 2006 annual competition for International Engine of the Year.
Was winner of the "1.0-litre 1.4-litre" category for six consecutive years in the 2006, 2007, 2008, 2009, 2010 and 2011 annual competition for International Engine of the Year.
Was winner of the "Green Engine of the Year" category in the 2009 annual competition for International Engine of the Year.
Was outright overall winner of the 2009 and 2010 International Engine of the Year annual competition.

=== 1.6 R4 16v ===
identification
parts code prefix: 036
engine displacement & engine configuration
1,598 cc (97.5 cu in) inline-four engine (R4/I4); bore x stroke: 76.5 mm × 86.9 mm (3.01 in × 3.42 in), stroke ratio: 0.88:1 – undersquare/long-stroke, 399.4 cc per cylinder, compression ratio: 10.5:1 (China), 11.5:1 (ATN, AUS, AZD, BCB), 12.1:1 (AUS)
cylinder block & crankcase
grey cast iron; five main bearings, die-forged steel crankshaft
cylinder head & valvetrain
cast aluminium alloy; four valves per cylinder, 16 valves total, double overhead camshaft (DOHC)
fuel system & engine management
electronic multipoint injection; Bosch MD 7; Magneti Marelli 4MV (ATN, AUS), 4LV (AZD, BCB), 7GV
electronic injection Total Flex gasoline or ethanol (Brazil)
DIN-rated motive power & torque outputs, ID codes
77 kW (105 PS; 103 bhp) at 5,700 rpm; 148 N⋅m (109 lbf⋅ft) at 4,500 rpm — AUS, AZD, ATN, BCB (discontinued)
77 kW (105 PS; 103 bhp) at 5,600 rpm; 153 N⋅m (113 lbf⋅ft) at 3,800 rpm — BTS, CFNA, CLSA
63 kW (86 PS; 84 bhp) at 5,200 rpm; 145 N⋅m (107 lbf⋅ft) at 3,750 rpm — CFNB
80 kW (109 PS; 107 bhp) at 5,800 rpm; 150 N⋅m (111 lbf⋅ft) at 4,200 rpm — (China)
applications
SEAT Ibiza Mk3, Mk4 & Mk5, SEAT Córdoba Mk2, SEAT León Mk1, SEAT Toledo Mk2, Mk3, Škoda Fabia Mk2, Škoda Rapid, Škoda Roomster (BTS: 05/06->), Škoda Octavia, Volkswagen Polo Mk4, Volkswagen Polo Mk5, Volkswagen Golf Mk4, Volkswagen Bora, VW Jetta Mk4 (China), Volkswagen Polo/Vento sedan

=== 1.8 R4 ===
identification
parts code prefix: ???, ID code: ADF
engine displacement & engine configuration
1,781 cc (108.7 cu in) inline-four engine (R4/I4); bore x stroke: 81.0 mm × 86.4 mm (3.19 in × 3.40 in), stroke ratio: 0.94:1 – undersquare/long-stroke, 445.2 cc per cylinder, compression ratio: 9.0:1
cylinder block & crankcase
grey cast iron; five main bearings, die-forged steel crankshaft
cylinder head & valvetrain
cast aluminium alloy; two valves per cylinder, 8 valves total, hydraulic bucket tappets, timing belt-driven single overhead camshaft (SOHC)
fuel system
Pierburg 1B3 downdraft carburettor
dimensions
length: 502 mm (19.8 in), width 656 mm (25.8 in), height 593 mm (23.3 in), dry mass: 111 kg (245 lb)
EWG-rated motive power & torque output
50 kW (68 PS; 67 bhp) at 4,000 rpm; 144 N⋅m (106 lbf⋅ft) at 2,100 rpm
application
Volkswagen Industrial Motor (04/94->)
reference
ADF 1.8 ltr [sic] Carburettor engine (PDF). Volkswagen AG. September 1993. Archived from the original (PDF) on 30 July 2013.

=== 1.8 R4 ===
identification
parts code prefix: ???, ID codes: HT, RD, RV, PB, GZ, GX, PF, FP, ABS, ADZ, ACC
engine displacement & engine configuration
1,781 cc (108.7 cu in) inline-four engine (R4/I4); bore x stroke: 81.0 mm × 86.4 mm (3.19 in × 3.40 in), stroke ratio: 0.94:1 – undersquare/long-stroke, 445.2 cc per cylinder, compression ratio: 8.5–10.8:1
cylinder block & crankcase
grey cast iron; five main bearings, die-forged steel crankshaft
cylinder head & valvetrain
cast aluminium alloy; two valves per cylinder, 8 valves total, single overhead camshaft (SOHC)
fuel system & engine management
Bosch CIS continuous single-point fuel injection system, with or without knock control and electronic timing advance
multi-point electronic indirect fuel injection with four intake manifold-sited fuel injectors; Magneti Marelli, Bosch Motronic or Digifant
electronic injection Total Flex, Gasoline or Ethanol (BR)
DIN-rated motive power & torque outputs, ID codes, applications
55 kW (75 PS; 74 bhp) at 5,000 rpm; 140 N⋅m (103 lbf⋅ft) at 2,500 rpm — AAM, ANN (discontinued)
66 kW (90 PS; 89 bhp) at 5,200 rpm; 142 N⋅m (105 lbf⋅ft) at 3,000 rpm — RP (discontinued)
66 kW (90 PS; 89 bhp) at 5,500 rpm; 145 N⋅m (107 lbf⋅ft) at 2,500 rpm — ABS, ADZ, ANP: VW Gol, VW Golf Mk3, VW Pointer, SEAT Ibiza Mk2
72 kW (98 PS; 97 bhp) at 5,400 rpm; 143 N⋅m (105 lbf⋅ft) at 3,000 rpm — 1P (discontinued)
76 kW (103 PS; 102 bhp) at 5,400 rpm; 155 N⋅m (114 lbf⋅ft) at 3,000 rpm — VW Gol, Volkswagen Santana, VW Golf Mk1, VW Golf Mk2, VW Saveiro
applications
Audi 80, Audi 100, SEAT Ibiza Mk2, SEAT Córdoba Mk1, SEAT Toledo Mk1, Volkswagen Golf Mk2, Volkswagen Golf Mk3, Volkswagen Golf Mk3 Cabriolet, Volkswagen Golf Mk3 Variant, Volkswagen Vento, Volkswagen Jetta Mk2, Volkswagen Jetta Mk3, Volkswagen Passat B2, Volkswagen Passat B3, Volkswagen Passat B4

=== 1.8 R4 16v ===
identification
parts code prefix: PL, 9A, KR (1.8 & 2.0 versions)
engine displacement & engine configuration
1,781 cc (108.7 cu in) inline-four engine (R4/I4); bore x stroke: 81.0 mm × 86.4 mm (3.19 in × 3.40 in), stroke ratio: 0.94:1 – undersquare/long-stroke, 445.2 cc per cylinder, compression ratio: 10.0:1, longitudinally mounted
cylinder block & crankcase
grey cast iron; five main bearings, die-forged steel crankshaft
cylinder head & valvetrain
cast aluminium alloy; four valves per cylinder, 16 valves total, double overhead camshaft (DOHC)
fuel system & engine management
multi-point electronic sequential indirect fuel injection with four intake manifold-sited fuel injectors; Bosch Motronic electronic engine control unit (ECU)
DIN-rated motive power & torque output
95 kW (129 PS; 127 bhp) at 6,000 rpm; 165 N⋅m (122 lbf⋅ft) at 4,800 rpm: SEAT Ibiza GTI

=== 1.8 R4 20vT (EA113/EA827) ===
Wholly created and developed by AUDI AG, this version is a 1.8-litre 20-valve turbocharged engine built in Wolfsburg, Germany; Győr, Hungary; and Puebla, Mexico. Output varies based on internal component selection, turbocharger, and engine control unit (ECU) software. This power plant has been extensively used in all four mainstream Volkswagen Group marques, along with Volkswagen Industrial Motor applications.

This engine is also used in a very high state of tune in the one-make Formula Palmer Audi (FPA) open-wheeled auto racing series. It develops 300 bhp (224 kW; 304 PS), with an extra 60 bhp (45 kW; 61 PS) available from a driver operated 'push-to-pass' turbo boost button. Based entirely on road-car production engines and prepared and built by Mountune Racing, it only differs by utilising a Pi Research Pectel electronic fuel injection and a water-cooled Garrett T34 turbocharger with closed-loop boost control.

Furthermore, an even higher 'step up' version of this engine was used in the later European-based FIA Formula Two Championship. Developed as a pure race engine and again built by Mountune Racing, this variant includes many all-new lightweight components, and has been converted to a dry sump lubrication system. For its initial 2009 season, it produced a continuous maximum power of 400 bhp (298 kW; 406 PS) at 8,250 revolutions per minute (rpm), and includes a limited duration 'overboost' to 450 bhp (336 kW; 456 PS), aided by an all-new Garrett GT35 turbocharger and a Pi Research Pectel MQ12 ECU. From the 2010 season, base power is increased to 425 bhp (317 kW; 431 PS), and with overboost to 480 bhp (358 kW; 487 PS).

identification
parts code prefix: 058, 06A, 06B
engine displacement & engine configuration
1,781 cc (108.7 cu in) inline-four engine (R4/I4); bore x stroke: 81.0 mm × 86.4 mm (3.19 in × 3.40 in), stroke ratio: 0.94:1 – undersquare/long-stroke, 445.2 cc per cylinder, compression ratio: 9.0–9.5:1
cylinder block & crankcase
grey cast iron; five main bearings, die-forged steel crankshaft, fracture-split forged steel connecting rods, Mahle forged aluminium alloy pistons
cylinder head & valvetrain
cast aluminium alloy; five valves per cylinder, 20 valves total, hydraulic bucket tappets, timing belt-driven double overhead camshaft (DOHC) with variable inlet valve timing
aspiration
cast aluminium alloy intake manifold, turbocharger, intercooler
fuel system, ignition system & engine management
multi-point electronic sequential indirect fuel injection with four intake manifold-sited fuel injectors; mapped direct ignition with four individual direct-acting single spark coils; Bosch Motronic ME 7.5 (MBE 975F on Industrial variants) electronic engine control unit (ECU), red line: 6,500 rpm, rev limit 6,800 rpm

Mass
149 kg ('BAM' engine, dry)

DIN-rated motive power & torque outputs, ID codes, applications
110 kW (150 PS; 148 bhp) at 5,800 rpm; 210 N⋅m (155 lbf⋅ft) at 1,750–4,600 rpm — AEB, AGU, AJH, ANB, APH, ARX, ARZ, ATW, AUM, AWC, AWD, AWL, AWT, AWV, AWW, BJX, BKF, BKV

VW Polo GTI, VW Golf Mk4 GTI, VW Bora, VW New Beetle, VW Passat B5 and VW Sagitar.VW Sharan . Also on the Audi TT Mk1 (8N), Audi A3 (first gen.), Audi A4, Audi A6, Škoda Octavia, Škoda Superb (first gen.) and SEAT Ibiza.

110 kW (150 PS; 148 bhp) at 5,700 rpm; 220 N⋅m (162 lbf⋅ft) at 1,800 rpm — EU5 rated: CFMA

SEAT Exeo (CFMA: 12/08-on)

115 kW (156 PS; 154 bhp) — AQX, AYP

SEAT Ibiza Mk3 Cupra, Cupra R, SEAT Cordoba Cupra

120 kW (163 PS; 161 bhp) at 5,700 rpm; 225 N⋅m (166 lbf⋅ft) at 1,950–4,700 rpm — BFB, BKB, BVP

replaced the 110 kW version in 2003 on most models; Audi A4, Audi TT

125 kW (170 PS; 168 bhp) at 5,900 rpm; 225 N⋅m (166 lbf⋅ft) at 1,950–5,000 rpm — AMB, AWM

Audi A4, VW Passat. This version only exists in North American and emerging markets.

132 kW (180 PS; 178 bhp) at 5,500 rpm; 235 N⋅m (173 lbf⋅ft) at 1,950–5,000 rpm — AJQ, APP, ARY, ATC, AUQ, AWP, BEK, BNU (North America only), AJL, BBU (UK)

Volkswagen Golf Mk4 GTI, VW Bora/Jetta, New Beetle, Audi A3, Audi A4 Quattro Sport, Audi TT Mk1 (8N), Škoda Octavia vRS, SEAT León, SEAT Toledo, VW Polo GTI.

140 kW (190 PS; 188 bhp) at 5,700 rpm; 240 N⋅m (177 lbf⋅ft) at 1,950–4,700 rpm — BEX, BVR

Audi A4 (BEX: 11/02-12/04), Audi TT Mk1 (8N) (BVR: 09/05-06/06)

154 kW (210 PS; 207 bhp); 270 N⋅m (199 lbf⋅ft) — APY, AUL, AMK

Audi S3 (8L) (APY: 11/98-08/00, AUL: 09/99-04/01, AMK: 09/00-04/02), SEAT León Mk1 (1M) Cupra R (05/02-05/03)

165 kW (225 PS; 222 bhp) at 5,900 rpm; 280 N⋅m (207 lbf⋅ft) at 2,200–5,500 rpm — AMU, BEA (North America only), APX, BAM

Audi TT Mk1 (8N), Audi S3 (8L), SEAT León Mk1 (1M) Cupra R (05/03-06/06). This version is built in Győr.

177 kW (240 PS; 237 bhp) at 5,700 rpm; 320 N⋅m (236 lbf⋅ft) at 2,300–5,000 rpm —

2005 Audi TT quattro Sport, (9:1 compression ratio) — BFV

EWG-rated motive power & torque outputs, applications
147 kW (200 PS; 197 bhp) at 6,000 rpm; 260 N⋅m (192 lbf⋅ft) at 2,500–5,500 rpm — Volkswagen Industrial Motor, Stage1
184 kW (250 PS; 247 bhp) at 6,000 rpm; 300 N⋅m (221 lbf⋅ft) at 2,500–5,500 rpm — Volkswagen Industrial Motor, Stage2
221 kW (300 PS; 296 bhp) at 6,000 rpm; 360 N⋅m (266 lbf⋅ft) at 4,000–5,500 rpm — Volkswagen Industrial Motor, Stage3
references
"Audi TT quattro Sport revealed". WorldCarFans.com. AUDI AG. 22 February 2005. Archived from the original on 23 October 2010.
The 1.8 Turbo Gasoline (PDF). Volkswagen AG. Archived from the original (PDF) on 14 July 2011.
"Formula Palmer Audi Championship – The FPA Car". FormulaPalmerAudi.com. MotorSport Vision. Archived from the original on 11 July 2011.
"The Williams JPH1 FIA Formula Two car". FormulaTwo.com. MotorSport Vision. 6 January 2010. Archived from the original on 19 May 2009.

==== awards ====
Was placed in the 1997, 1998, 2001, 2002 and 2003 annual list of Ward's 10 Best Engines

=== 2.0 R4 16v "Turbo FSI"/TSI/TFSI (EA113) ===
This turbocharged EA113 engine is based on the naturally aspirated 110kW 2.0 FSI.

identification
parts code prefix/variant: 06F.C, 06F.D
engine displacement & engine configuration
1,984 cc (121.1 cu in) inline-four engine (R4/I4); bore x stroke: 82.5 mm × 92.8 mm (3.25 in × 3.65 in), stroke ratio: 0.89:1 – undersquare/long-stroke, 496.1 cc per cylinder, compression ratio: 10.5:1
cylinder block & crankcase
CG25 grey cast iron with liquid-blasted cylinder bore honing; 88 mm (3.46 in) cylinder spacing, five main bearings, die-forged steel crankshaft, two simplex-roller chain driven balance shafts
cylinder head & valvetrain
cast aluminium alloy; modified inlet duct geometry for high tumble values providing superior knock resistance, four valves per cylinder (exhaust valves sodium filled for increased cooling), 16 valves total, low-friction roller finger cam followers with automatic hydraulic valve clearance compensation, belt and roller-chain driven double overhead camshaft (DOHC), continuous intake camshaft adjustment (42° variance from crankshaft)
aspiration
hot-film air mass meter incorporated into air filter housing, cast alloy throttle body with electronically controlled throttle valve, plastic variable length controlled intake manifold with charge movement flaps adjusted by a continuous-action pilot motor, 0.9 bar (13.1 psi) boost water-cooled BorgWarner K03 turbocharger (K04 on 169 kW upwards) incorporated in exhaust manifold, sandwiched central front-mounted intercooler (FMIC)
fuel system
fully demand-controlled and returnless; – fuel tank–mounted low-pressure fuel pump, Fuel Stratified Injection (FSI): inlet camshaft double-cam driven Hitachi single-piston high-pressure injection pump maintaining a pressure between 30 and 110 bar (440 and 1,600 psi) in the stainless steel common rail fuel rail, four combustion chamber sited direct injection sequential solenoid-controlled fuel injectors, air-guided combustion process, multi-pulse injection with homogeneous mixing, stratified lean-burn operation with excess air at part load
ignition system & engine management
centrally positioned Bosch longlife spark plugs, mapped direct ignition with four individual direct-acting single spark coils; Bosch Motronic MED 9.1 electronic engine control unit (ECU), cylinder-selective knock control via two knock sensors, permanent lambda control
exhaust system
Cast iron exhaust manifold (with integrated BorgWarner turbocharger), one primary and one main ceramic catalytic converters, two heated oxygen sensors monitoring pre- and post catalyst exhaust gases
dimensions
length: 652 mm (25.7 in), width: 648 mm (25.5 in), height: 666 mm (26.2 in), mass: 152 kg (335 lb)
DIN-rated motive power & torque outputs, ID codes & applications
125 kW (170 PS; 168 bhp) at 4,300 rpm; 280 N⋅m (207 lbf⋅ft) at 1,800–4,200 rpm — BPJ — Audi A6 (C6), VW Tiguan
136 kW (185 PS; 182 bhp) at 6,000 rpm; 270 N⋅m (199 lbf⋅ft) at 1,800–5,000 rpm — BWA — 2005 SEAT León
147 kW (200 PS; 197 bhp) at 5,100–6,000 rpm; 280 N⋅m (207 lbf⋅ft) at 1,700–5,000 rpm — AXX, BWA, BWE, BPY (North America) — Audi A4 (B7), Audi A3 (8P), 2006 Audi TT, VW Passat (B6), VW Golf Mk5 GTI, VW Jetta Mk5 GLI, SEAT León FR Mk2, SEAT Altea, SEAT Toledo Mk3, SEAT Exeo, Škoda Octavia (1Z) vRS

162 kW (220 PS; 217 bhp) at 5,900 rpm; 300 N⋅m (221 lbf⋅ft) at 2,200–4,800 rpm — BUL — 2005 Audi A4 (B7) DTM Edition, Audi A4 (B7) Special Edition
162 kW (220 PS; 217 bhp) at 4,500–6,300 rpm; 350 N⋅m (258 lbf⋅ft) at 2,500–4,400 rpm — CDL — Volkswagen Polo R WRC
141 kW (192 PS; 189 bhp) at 4,200–6,000 rpm; 320 N⋅m (236 lbf⋅ft) at 1,450–4,200 rpm — CDL — Audi A5 (B9; 40 TFSI)
169 kW (230 PS; 227 bhp) at 5,500 rpm; 300 N⋅m (221 lbf⋅ft) at 2,250–5,200 rpm — BYD — VW Golf Mk5 GTI Edition 30, Pirelli Edition
173 kW (235 PS; 232 bhp) at 5,500 rpm; 300 N⋅m (221 lbf⋅ft) at 2,200–5,200 rpm — CDL — Volkswagen Golf MKVI GTI Edition 35
177 kW (240 PS; 237 bhp) at 6,000 rpm; 300 N⋅m (221 lbf⋅ft) at 2,200–5,500 rpm — BWJ — SEAT León Cupra Mk2
177 kW (240 PS; 237 bhp) at 5,700–6,300 rpm; 300 N⋅m (221 lb⋅ft) at 2,200–5,500 rpm — CDLD — SEAT León Cupra Mk2 facelift
186 kW (253 PS; 249 bhp) at 5,000–6,000 rpm; 370 N⋅m (273 lbf⋅ft) at 1,600–4,500 rpm — CDLA — Audi A5 (B9; 45 TFSI)
188 kW (256 PS; 252 bhp) at 6,000 rpm; 330 N⋅m (243 lbf⋅ft) at 2,400–5,200 rpm — CDL — Audi S3 (8P), Golf R (Australia, Japan, Middle-East and North America)
195 kW (265 PS; 261 bhp) at 6,000 rpm; 350 N⋅m (258 lbf⋅ft) at 2,500–5,000 rpm — BHZ — Audi S3 (8P)
195 kW (265 PS; 261 bhp) at 6,000 rpm; 350 N⋅m (258 lbf⋅ft) at 2,500–5,000 rpm — CDL — Scirocco R
195 kW (265 PS; 261 bhp) at 6,000 rpm; 350 N⋅m (258 lbf⋅ft) at 2,300–5,200 rpm — CDLA — Audi S3 (8P), Audi TTS, SEAT León Cupra R Mk2 facelift, VW Scirocco R
199 kW (270 PS; 266 bhp) at 6,000 rpm; 350 N⋅m (258 lbf⋅ft) at 2,500–5,000 rpm — CDLF — Golf R (Europe)
200 kW (272 PS; 268 bhp) at 6,000 rpm; 350 N⋅m (258 lbf⋅ft) at 2,500–5,000 rpm — CDLB — Audi TTS (Europe), VW Arteon (North America)
206 kW (280 PS; 276 bhp) at 6,000 rpm; 350 N⋅m (258 lbf⋅ft) at 2,500–5,000 rpm — CDLK — VW Scirocco R facelift
notes
the 162 kW (only Polo R WRC) and higher versions have stronger pistons and gudgeon pins, new rings, reinforced connecting rods, new bearings, reinforced cylinder block at the main bearing pedestals and cap, new lightweight aluminium-silicon alloy cylinder head for high temperature resistance and strength, adjusted exhaust camshaft timing, increased cross-section high-pressure injectors, 1.2 bar (17.4 psi) (value only valid for Audi S3(8P)) boost pressure K04 turbocharger with larger turbine and compression rotor (S3, Cupra, GTI Edition 30), of which some components are NOT shared with the lower output variants
references
The 2.0L FSI Turbocharged Engine – Design and Function. Self-Study Program (Course Number 821503 ed.). Auburn Hills, MI: Volkswagen of America, Inc. August 2005.
"Audi A3 Sportback – in depth". WorldCarFans.com. AUDI AG. 19 July 2004. Archived from the original on 30 July 2013.

==== awards ====
Was winner of the "1.8-litre 2.0-litre" category for four consecutive years in the 2005, 2006, 2007 and 2008 annual competition for International Engine of the Year,
Was placed for four consecutive years in the 2006, 2007, 2008 and 2009 annual list of Ward's 10 Best Engines

== EA888 R3/R4 ==
The EA888 engines are a family of three- and four-cylinder engines that are currently in use across the Volkswagen Group. An EA888 family is a corporate VAG designed unit that is an evolution of the earlier EA827/113 units. It features some of the latest engine technology such as direct fuel injection, sintered camshaft lobes, thin-walled engine block, variable valve timing and lift for intake and exhaust valves, downstream oxygen sensors, exhaust manifold integrated into the cylinder head, exhaust gas recirculation and cooling, distributorless coil-on-plug ignition, lightweight engine internals, slide valve thermostat (some variants), and the addition of port fuel injection to aid low load fuel consumption and cold start emissions. The port fuel injection also aids in reducing the potential carbon deposits that can occur in direct-injected engines. As of 2024, the 'dual injection' system has not been offered in North American markets. Still, VAG has made numerous enhancements to their engine designs such as the positive crankcase ventilation, repositioning injectors and more to lessen the potential that carbon deposits accumulate on intake valves. Currently, the EA888 engine is available in two sizes: 1.8T and 2.0T. Engine output ranges from 111 kW (151 PS; 149 bhp) to over 231 kW (314 PS; 310 bhp). A concept car based on the Volkswagen Golf R, dubbed R400, produced 395 hp from 2 litres of displacement. Furthermore, the R400 would be able to accelerate from 0–100 km/h in 3.8 seconds, thanks to a Haldex 4-wheel drive system, and a 6 or 7-speed DSG gearbox. The EA888 engine family has also found its way into the Porsche lineup, specifically in the Macan models. The Macan uses a reworked version of the Volkswagen Group’s 2.0-litre inline-four EA888 Gen 3 engine. This engine is a variant of the EA888, producing 261 hp and 295 lb-ft. It is paired with a Doppelkupplungsgetriebe, which means PDK (Porsche Dual-clutch transmission) and is Porsche's version of the DSG found in VAG vehicles. The PDK transmission is essentially two gearboxes in one and features hydraulically actuated wet-clutch packs. Depending on the gear, it alternates power to the engine via two separate driveshafts. This combination of the EA888 engine and PDK transmission in the Porsche Macan showcases the versatility of these technologies and their ability to enhance performance. The exact same performance also applies to other VAG vehicles with DSG transmissions for a much more friendly pricetag.

This latest EA888 family of straight-four 16-valve internal combustion engines with variable valve timing is anticipated to be an eventual complete replacement of the EA113 range. It was wholly designed and developed by VAG AG. The only common feature with its predecessors is the sharing of the same 88 mm (3.46 in) cylinder spacing – which keeps the engine length relatively short, meaning it can be installed either transversely or longitudinally, though engineers have said that it is an evolution of the earlier EA827/113 designs due to cost concerns. Grey cast iron (GJL 250) remains the choice material for the cylinder block and crankcase, due to its inherent good acoustic dampening properties. This all-new EA888 range is notable for utilising simplex roller chains to drive the two overhead camshafts, instead of the former engines' toothed-rubber timing belt. Like the final developments of the former EA113 engine generation, all EA888s only use the VAG AG/Bosch Fuel Stratified Injection (FSI) direct injection. Furthermore, EA888 engines are also able to utilise the corporate 'valvelift' technology, which complements the existing variable valve timing. This new family of engines is scheduled to be universally available for all markets on five continents, within all marques of the Volkswagen Group. The closely related EA113 range still remains in production.

Grainger & Worrall was reported to have cast 50 CGI cylinder blocks for over 12 months as of October 2013, based on the EA888 gasoline engine.

There are five generation of EA888. Gen 1 and Gen 2 from 2007-2011, Gen 3 from 2011–2020, Gen 4 from 2020. Volkswagen announcement EA888 Gen 5 on Teramont Pro in 2025.

=== 1.8 R4 16v TSI/TFSI (EA888) ===
identification
parts code prefix: 06H, 06J; ID codes: BYT
engine displacement & engine configuration
1,798 cc (109.7 cu in) EA888 inline-four engine (R4/I4); bore x stroke: 82.5 mm × 84.1 mm (3.25 in × 3.31 in), stroke ratio: 0.98:1 – 'square engine', 449.6 cc per cylinder; compression ratio: 9.6:1, 88 mm (3.46 in) cylinder spacing
cylinder block & crankcase
GJL 250 grey cast iron; 33 kg (73 lb), die-forged steel crankshaft with five 58 mm (2.28 in) diameter main bearings, two toothed chain-driven counter-rotating balance shafts suppressing second degree free inertial forces and oil pump, horizontal-baffled oil sump
cylinder head & valvetrain
cast aluminium alloy; four valves per cylinder, 16 valves total, low-friction roller finger cam followers with automatic hydraulic valve clearance compensation, toothed chain-driven double overhead camshaft (DOHC), continuous vane-adjustable variable intake valve timing
aspiration
hot-film air mass meter, cast alloy throttle body with electronically controlled Bosch E-Gas throttle valve, plastic variable length controlled intake manifold with charge movement flaps controlling combustion chamber air movement, BorgWarner K03 water-cooled turbocharger incorporated into cast iron exhaust manifold, sandwiched central front-mounted intercooler (FMIC)
fuel system
fully demand-controlled and returnless; – fuel tank–mounted low-pressure fuel pump; Fuel Stratified Injection (FSI): single-piston high-pressure injection pump driven by a four-lobe cam on the exhaust camshaft supplying up to 150 bar (2,180 psi) fuel pressure in the stainless steel common rail fuel rail, four combustion chamber sited direct injection sequential solenoid-controlled six-hole fuel injectors, air-guided combustion process, multi-pulse dual-stage injection during the induction and compression stroke with homogeneous mixing, stratified lean-burn operation with excess air at part load, 95 RON unleaded ultra-low sulphur petrol
ignition system & engine management
centrally positioned longlife spark plugs, mapped direct ignition with four individual direct-acting single spark coils; Bosch Motronic MED electronic engine control unit (ECU), cylinder-selective knock control via two knock sensors, permanent lambda control
exhaust system
cast iron exhaust manifold (with integrated turbocharger), close-coupled and main catalytic converters – both ceramic
DIN-rated motive power & torque outputs, ID codes
88 kW (120 PS; 118 bhp) at 4,000–6,200 rpm; 230 N⋅m (170 lbf⋅ft) at 1,500–3,650rpm — longitudinal — Audi A4 (B8), SEAT Exeo
118 kW (160 PS; 158 bhp) at 4,500–6,200 rpm; 250 N⋅m (184 lbf⋅ft) at 1,500–4,500 rpm, 165 N⋅m (122 lbf⋅ft) from 1,000 rpm — transversal — CDAAAudi A3 Mk2 (8P), Audi TT Mk2 (8J), Škoda Yeti, SEAT Leon Mk2 (1P)
112 kW (152 PS; 150 bhp) at 4,300–6,200 rpm; 250 N⋅m (184 lbf⋅ft) at 1,500–4,200 rpm, 165 N⋅m (122 lbf⋅ft) from 1,000 rpm — transversal — CDAB Škoda Yeti
118 kW (160 PS; 158 bhp) at 4,500–6,200 rpm; 250 N⋅m (184 lbf⋅ft) at 1,500–4,500 rpm — longitudinal — Audi A4 (B8), SEAT Exeo — CDHB Audi A4 (B8)
125 kW (170 PS; 168 bhp) at 4,800–6,200 rpm; 250 N⋅m (184 lbf⋅ft) at 1,750–4,750 rpm — transverse — VW USA-Passat B7 (NMS) — CPKA, CPRA (born 2014)
125 kW (170 PS; 168 bhp) at 4,800–6,200 rpm; 250 N⋅m (184 lbf⋅ft) at 1,500–4,800 rpm — longitudinal — Audi A5
125 kW (170 PS; 168 bhp) at 3,800–6,200 rpm; 320 N⋅m (236 lbf⋅ft) at 1,400–3,700 rpm — longitudinal — Audi A4 (B8) (2012–), Audi A5 — CJEB
132 kW (179 PS; 177 bhp) at 5,100–6,200 rpm; 250 N⋅m (184 lbf⋅ft) at 1,250–5,000 rpm — transverse — Audi TT (FV/8S) (2014–) — CJSA (EA888-Gen3)
applications
Audi TT Mk2 (8J), Audi 8P A3, Audi B7 A4, Audi A4 (B8), Audi A5, SEAT Leon Mk2 (1P), SEAT Altea XL, Škoda Yeti, Škoda Octavia Mk3 (5E), Škoda Superb Mk3 (3V), VW Jetta Mk5/Sagitar, VW Passat B8, VW Passat CC
references
of the German technical engine publication mtz, press release 11/2006: "Der neue Audi 1.8 TFSI-Motor"Owners Manual, Passat, U.S. Edition, Model Year 2015. p. 44.
"Sporty Dynamism, Superb Comfort: The Audi 1.8 TFSI". AudiWorld.com. AUDI AG – press release. 27 September 2006.
"Audi TT Roadster slims down for Summer". Audi.co.uk. Audi UK. 23 March 2009. Archived from the original on 19 May 2011.
"SEAT Exeo with new engines". Auto-motor-und-sport.de. 3 May 2008.
"Audi Unveils New 1.8 TFSI: 170 HP, 41 MPG". www.motorauthority.com. 4 August 2011.
"Audi ETKA Engine Code" (PDF). vag-codes.info. 3 August 2015.

=== 2.0 R4 16v TSI/TFSI (EA888) ===
Manufacturing commenced March 2008.

identification
parts code prefix: 06H, 06J; ID codes: CAEA, CAEB, CAED, CAWA, CAWB, CBFA, CCTA, CCTB, CCZA, CCZB, CCZC, CCZD, CDNB, CDNC, CHHA, CHHB, CJXA, CJXB, CJXC, CJXD, CJXE, CJXF, CJXG, CULA, CULC, CYFB, CZPA, DKFA
engine displacement & engine configuration
1,984 cc (121.1 cu in) EA888 inline-four engine (R4/I4); bore x stroke: 82.5 mm × 92.8 mm (3.25 in × 3.65 in), stroke ratio: 0.89:1 – undersquare/long-stroke, 496.1 cc per cylinder; compression ratio: 9.6:1 (10.3:1 A3 Cabrio 2009), 88 mm (3.46 in) cylinder spacing
cylinder block & crankcase
GJL 250 grey cast iron; 33 kg (73 lb), die-forged steel crankshaft with five 58 mm (2.28 in) diameter main bearings, two chain-driven counter-rotating balance shafts suppressing second degree free inertial forces and oil pump, horizontal-baffled oil sump. The water pump bolts to the side of the block, under the intake manifold, and is driven by a toothed belt and a pulley on the back of the intake-side balance shaft.
cylinder head & valvetrain
cast aluminium alloy; four valves per cylinder, 16 valves total, low-friction roller finger cam followers with automatic hydraulic valve clearance compensation, toothed chain-driven double overhead camshaft (DOHC), continuous vane-adjustable variable intake valve timing, Audi variants have two-stage "valvelift" inlet valve lift variable control
aspiration
hot-film air mass meter, cast alloy throttle body with electronically controlled Bosch E-Gas throttle valve, plastic variable length controlled intake manifold with charge movement flaps controlling combustion chamber air movement, IHI Corporation water-cooled turbocharger incorporated in exhaust manifold, sandwiched central front-mounted intercooler (FMIC)
fuel system
fully demand-controlled and returnless; – fuel tank–mounted low-pressure fuel pump; Fuel Stratified Injection (FSI): single-piston high-pressure injection pump driven by a four-lobe cam on the exhaust camshaft supplying up to 190 bar (2,760 psi) fuel pressure in the stainless steel common rail fuel rail, four combustion chamber sited direct injection sequential solenoid-controlled six-hole fuel injectors, air-guided combustion process, multi-pulse dual-stage injection during the induction and compression stroke with homogeneous mixing, stratified lean-burn operation with excess air at part load, 95 RON ultra-low sulphur unleaded petrol
ignition system & engine management
centrally positioned longlife spark plugs, mapped direct ignition with four individual direct-acting single spark coils; Bosch Motronic MED 17 electronic engine control unit (ECU), cylinder-selective knock control via two knock sensors, permanent lambda control
exhaust system
cast iron exhaust manifold (with integrated turbocharger), close-coupled and main catalytic converters – both ceramic
DIN-rated motive power & torque outputs and applications – Non-valvelift variants
125 kW (170 PS; 168 bhp) at 4,300–6,000 rpm; 280 N⋅m (207 lbf⋅ft) at 1,700–5,000 rpm — CAWA: VW Tiguan
125 kW (170 PS; 168 bhp) at 4,300–6,200 rpm; 280 N⋅m (207 lbf⋅ft) at 1,700–4,200 rpm — CCZC: Audi Q3, engine is installed transversely, VW Tiguan
132 kW (179 PS; 177 bhp) at 4,500–6,200 rpm; 280 N⋅m (207 lbf⋅ft) at 1,700–4,500 rpm — CCZD: VW Tiguan
147 kW (200 PS; 197 bhp) at 5,100–6,000 rpm; 280 N⋅m (207 lbf⋅ft) at 1,800–5,000 rpm — CCTA/CBFA: 2009 VW Golf Mk5 GTI (US only), VW Golf Mk6 GTI (US only), Audi Q3 (US Only), VW Jetta Mk5, VW Jetta Mk6, VW Passat B6, VW CC, Audi A3 (8P)
147 kW (200 PS; 197 bhp) at 5,100–6,000 rpm; 280 N⋅m (207 lbf⋅ft) at 1,700–5,000 rpm — CAWB: Audi A3 Cabriolet, VW Scirocco, VW Tiguan, CCZA: Audi TT, Škoda Superb Mk2 (3T), Škoda Octavia
147 kW (200 PS; 197 bhp) at 5,000–6,000 rpm; 280 N⋅m (207 lbf⋅ft) at 1,800–5,000 rpm — CGMA: China market only; VW Golf Mk6 GTI, VW Tiguan, VW Magotan (Passat)
154 kW (210 PS; 207 bhp) at 5,000–6,200 rpm; 300 N⋅m (221 lbf⋅ft) at 1,800–4,900 rpm — CPSA: Audi Q3, engine is installed transversely
154 kW (210 PS; 207 bhp) at 5,300–6,200 rpm; 280 N⋅m (207 lbf⋅ft) at 1,700–5,200 rpm — CCZB: VW Golf Mk6 GTI, has larger front-mounted intercooler as found in 2010+ Audi S3/VW Mk6 Golf R CDL EA113, VW Scirocco, VW Passat, VW CC, VW Tiguan, SEAT Altea Freetrack, SEAT Leon FR
DIN-rated motive power & torque outputs and applications – EA888 evo2 and EA888 Gen3 with Valvelift at exhaust side.
132 kW (180 PS; 178 bhp) at 4,200–6,000 rpm; 320 N⋅m (236 lbf⋅ft) at 1,500–4,000 rpm — CAEA/CDNB: Audi A4 (B8), Audi Q5, Škoda Kodiaq CULA: VW Scirocco
154 kW (210 PS; 207 bhp) at 4,300–6,000 rpm; 350 N⋅m (260 lbf⋅ft) at 1,500–4,200 rpm — CAEA/CAEB/CDNC: Audi A4 (B8), Audi A5, Audi Q5, SEAT Exeo
154 kW (210 PS; 207 bhp) at 4,300–6,000 rpm; 350 N⋅m (258 lbf⋅ft) at 1,600–4,200 rpm — CESA: Audi TT Mk2 (8J), engine is installed transversely
162 kW (220 PS; 217 bhp) at 4,500–6,200 rpm; 350 N⋅m (258 lbf⋅ft) at 1,500–4,400 rpm — CHHB: Audi A3, Skoda Superb, VW Golf Mk7 GTI, Škoda Octavia RS, VW Tiguan CULC: VW Scirocco GTS
165 kW (224 PS; 221 bhp) at 4,500–6,250 rpm; 350 N⋅m (258 lbf⋅ft) at 1,500–4,500 rpm — CNCD: Porsche Macan, Audi Q5, Audi A4 (B8)
165 kW (224 PS; 221 bhp) at 4,500–6,250 rpm; 350 N⋅m (258 lbf⋅ft) at 1,500–4,500 rpm — CUHA: China 5 emission standard Volkswagen Phideon, Audi A6L C7
165 kW (224 PS; 221 bhp) at 4,500–6,250 rpm; 350 N⋅m (258 lbf⋅ft) at 1,650–4,500 rpm — DMJA: China 6b(PN 11 without RDE) emission standard, Volkswagen Phideon
165 kW (224 PS; 221 bhp) at 4,500–6,250 rpm; 350 N⋅m (258 lbf⋅ft) at 1,650–4,500 rpm — DKWB: China 6b(PN 11 without RDE) emission standard, Audi A6L C8, Audi Q5L
165 kW (224 PS; 221 bhp) at 4,500–6,250 rpm; 370 N⋅m (273 lbf⋅ft) at 1,500–4,500 rpm — DKWA: China 6b(PN 11 without RDE) emission standard, Audi A4L, Audi Q5L
169 kW (230 PS; 227 bhp) at 4,700–6,200 rpm; 350 N⋅m (258 lbf⋅ft) at 1,500–4,600 rpm — CHHA/DKFA: VW Golf Mk7 GTI Performance, Škoda Octavia RS230, VW Jetta Mk7 GLI
180 kW (245 PS; 241 bhp) at 4,700–6,200 rpm; 370 N⋅m (273 lbf⋅ft) at 1,600–4,300 rpm — DLBA: Škoda Octavia RS245, VW Tiguan
195 kW (265 PS; 261 bhp) at 5,350–6,600 rpm; 350 N⋅m (258 lbf⋅ft) at 1,750–5,300 rpm — CJXE: Volkswagen Golf MK7 GTI Clubsport, SEAT Leon Cupra, Audi Q5
206 kW (280 PS; 276 bhp) at 5,100–6,500 rpm; 380 N⋅m (280 lbf⋅ft) at 1,800–5,500 rpm — CJXA/CJXB: SEAT Leon Cupra, Skoda Superb. (Audi S3 and VW Golf Mk7 R in some foreign markets)
213 kW (290 PS; 286 bhp) at 5,900–6,400 rpm; 350 N⋅m (258 lbf⋅ft) at 1,700–5,800 rpm — CJXD: SEAT Leon Cupra
215 kW (292 PS; 288 bhp) at 5,400 rpm; 380 N⋅m (280 lbf⋅ft) at 1,800 rpm — CYFB: VW Golf Mk7 R, Audi S3 in North America (lacks MPI)
221 kW (300 PS; 296 bhp) at 5,500–6,200 rpm; 380 N⋅m (280 lbf⋅ft) at 1,800–5,500 rpm — CJXC/CJXA: Audi S3, VW Golf Mk7 R (Europe), SEAT Leon Cupra
228 kW (310 PS; 306 bhp); 380 N⋅m (280 lbf⋅ft) — CJXG: Audi TTS, VW Golf Mk7 R, SEAT Leon Cupra R
235 kW (320 PS; 316 bhp); 420 N⋅m (310 lbf⋅ft) — Evo4 - Golf Mk8 R (400 Nm in some markets)
DIN-rated motive power & torque outputs and applications – EA888 Gen3 with Valvelift at intake side known as EA888 Gen3 Bz.
137 kW (186 PS; 184 bhp) at 4,100–6,000 rpm; 320 N⋅m (236 lbf⋅ft) at 1,600–4,000 rpm — DBFA: China 5 emission standard, Volkswagen Magotan
137 kW (186 PS; 184 bhp) at 4,100–6,000 rpm; 320 N⋅m (236 lbf⋅ft) at 1,500–4,000 rpm — DKVA: China 6b(without PN 11) emission standard, Volkswagen Magotan
137 kW (186 PS; 184 bhp) at 4,100–6,000 rpm; 320 N⋅m (236 lbf⋅ft) at 1,500–4,000 rpm — DPLA: China 6b(PN 11 without RDE) emission standard, Volkswagen Magotan
140 kW (190 PS; 188 bhp) at 4,200–6,000 rpm; 320 N⋅m (236 lbf⋅ft) at 1,450–4,200 rpm — CWNA: China 5 emission standard Audi A4L
140 kW (190 PS; 188 bhp) at 4,200–6,000 rpm; 320 N⋅m (236 lbf⋅ft) at 1,450–4,200 rpm — DKUA: China 6b(without PN 11) emission standard Audi A4L
140 kW (190 PS; 188 bhp) at 4,200–6,000 rpm; 320 N⋅m (236 lbf⋅ft) at 1,450–4,200 rpm — DTAA: China 6b(PN 11 without RDE) emission standard Audi A4L
accepted motor oils
Castrol EDGE and Mobil 1 (Porsche Macan only)
reference
"Audi adds 2.0 TFSI with Valvelift to A5 Coupé". PaulTan.org. 25 June 2008.
"SEAT Exeo with new engines". Auto-motor-und-sport.de. 3 May 2008.:"Volkswagen Magotan". autohome.com.cn.
"Audi A4L". autohome.com.cn.

==== awards ====
Winner of the "1.8-litre 2.0-litre" category in the 2009 annual competition for International Engine of the Year.

==== Known problems ====
The Generation 1 EA888 suffered from higher than usual / favorable engine oil consumption in both 1.8 and 2.0 litre forms. Mainly affecting the Longitudinal Audi applications between 2008 and 2012 (most commonly the 8K / B8 A4 8T / 8F B8 A5 & 8R Q5). In rare occurrences it affects the Transverse applications in the 8P Audi A3, 8J Audi TT and in even rarer occasions would affect the MK6 Volkswagen Golf GTI and lower powered Sciroccos etc. that were not fitted with the EA113 family of engines. In even more extreme cases it would affect the Generation 3 from 2016 to present day. The rectification for this is performed after a two part oil consumption test is carried out by a main dealer, The vehicle will need to be burning more than approximately a metric litre per 1,000 KM or 600 miles, or if the top up oil warning illuminates on the instrument cluster. Only after this test is carried out and an agreement of payment by the manufacturer & customer contribution is agreed the repair can be carried out only by main dealers and manufacturer approved repairers. The rectification that is carried out is to remove the engine, replace the Piston & Connecting Rod assemblies in all four cylinders with modified units, head gasket and so forth. From late 2012, the modified internal engine components were fitted to new replacement engines and new vehicle units by the Volkswagen group engine plants.

Another common issue is camshaft timing chain tensioner failure, again in earlier generation 1 models. This was due to the design of the retaining element that after higher mileages and / or premature wear stopped the tensioner from holding the tension in the timing chain. If in the case of this component failing, the chain would jump, allowing the pistons and valves to potentially hit each other, causing expensive and possibly terminal engine damage. Along with the earlier mentioned oil consumption issues, this was eventually addressed by the Volkswagen Group engine plants, Who fitted a modified (internally known as Version 2) tensioner that is retained by a much more reliable spring retainer instead.

The final mainstream common issue affects all EA888 generations. The cooling system is mainly a problem free system, with the exception of the plastic thermostat unit, these are very commonly known to be prone to leaks, with no specific part of the housing known to leak. On the EA888, the thermostat unit also includes the coolant pump, on the Generation 2 & 3 the coolant pump is still part of the thermostat, however is available separately. The coolant pump / thermostat unit is located under the intake manifold regardless of generation, model year or application. The thermostat side is joined by a plastic union directly to the engine oil cooler, which in turn is mounted to and is an integral part of the ancillary / alternator bracket (also includes the oil filter housing in all generations and applications). The coolant pump is driven by the intake side balance shaft, on the flywheel side of the engine. The rectification is to renew the thermostat unit with a modified unit, and if needed in later models, the coolant pump if necessary. However these newer units are still known to leak. There have currently been no further modifications to the design of this to combat the issues by Volkswagen Group.

===== Turbo =====
The MQB platform suffers from early turbocharger failure. This affects models like the Audi S3, Golf 7 R/GTI and the Seat Cupra models. More so: models built prior to 2015 are more prone to failure. This can be caused because there is shaft play due to an imbalanced input shaft which can cause the turbine to collide with the teflon coating of the turbocharger, or because of the manifold sealing surface.

====== List of turbos ======
IHI IS20 - Transverse - Mid output engines, like 2.0T A3

- 06K 145 702 K
- 06K 145 702 Q
- 06K 145 702 R
- 06K 145 702 T
- 06K 145 722 G
- 06K 145 722 K
- 06K 145 722 L

IHI IS20 - Longitudinal - Mid output engines, like 2.0T A4

- 06L 145 702
- 06L 145 702 D
- 06L 145 702 F
- 06L 145 702 M
- 06L 145 702 P
- 06L 145 702 Q
- 06L 145 702 R
- 06L 145 722 B
- 06L 145 722 C
- 06L 145 722 D
- 06L 145 722 E
- 06L 145 722 F
- 06L 145 722 G
- 06L 145 722 L
- 06L 145 722 M

IHI IS38 - Transverse - High output engine, like 2.0T S3, Golf R

- 06K 145 702 J
- 06K 145 702 M
- 06K 145 702 N
- 06K 145 722 A
- 06K 145 722 H
- 06K 145 722 N
- 06K 145 722 P
- 06K 145 722 S
- 06K 145 722 T
- 06K 145 874 F
- 06K 145 874 N

E888 Gen 4 Turbochargers Garrett Mk8/8.5 GTI

- 06Q 145 702 B
- 06Q 145 702 C

Continental Mk8 Golf R, 8Y S3, 22-23 Arteon

- 06Q 145 703 H
- 06Q 145 703 G

Waterpump/thermostat

== EA855 R5 ==
An all-new engine designed by AUDI AG's high-performance subsidiary Audi Sport GmbH (formerly quattro GmbH), harking back to the original turbocharged five cylinder Audi engines in the "Ur-" Audi Quattro of the 1980s. A world first for a petrol engine, its cylinder block is constructed from compacted vermicular graphite cast iron (GJV/CGI) – first used in Audi's large displacement, high-performance Turbocharged Direct Injection (TDI) diesel engines.

identification
parts code prefix/variant: 07K3; ID code: CEPA, CEPB, CTSA, CZGA, CZGB, DAZA, DNWA
engine displacement & engine configuration
2,480 cc (151.3 cu in) inline five engine (R5/I5); bore x stroke: 82.5 mm × 92.8 mm (3.25 in × 3.65 in), stroke ratio: 0.89:1 – undersquare/long-stroke, 496.1 cc per cylinder; 88 mm (3.46 in) cylinder spacing, 144 degree firing interval, firing order: 1-2-4-5-3, compression ratio: 10.0:1
cylinder block & crankcase
GJV-450 compacted vermicular graphite cast iron (GJV/CGI); six main bearings, two-part cast aluminium alloy horizontal-baffled oil sump, simplex roller chain-driven oil pump, die-forged steel crankshaft, forged steel connecting rods, cast aluminium alloy pistons (weight, each, including rings and gudgeon pin: 492 g (17.4 oz))
cylinder head & valvetrain
cast high heat-strength aluminium alloy, modified inlet duct geometry for high tumble values providing superior knock resistance, four valves per cylinder (exhaust valves sodium filled for increased cooling), 20 valves total, low-friction roller finger cam followers with automatic hydraulic valve clearance compensation, simplex roller chain-driven (relay method) lightweight double overhead camshafts (DOHC), variable valve timing with continuous adjusting intake and exhaust camshaft timing of up to 42 degrees from the crankshaft, two-stage 'valvelift' variable lift control for inlet valves, siamesed inlet ports, Audi "RS" 'red' plastic cam cover
aspiration
twin charge pressure sensors; one pre-throttle plate, one intake manifold mounted, no air flow meter, cast alloy throttle body with electronically controlled throttle valve, two piece intake manifold with charge movement flaps adjusted by a continuous-action pilot motor, water-cooled turbocharger incorporated in exhaust manifold with 64 mm (2.5 in) diameter outlet, generating up to 1.2 bar (17.4 psi) boost, separated central lower front-mounted intercooler (FMIC)
fuel system
fully demand-controlled and returnless: fuel tank-mounted low-pressure fuel lift pump; Fuel Stratified Injection (FSI): single-piston high-pressure injection pump supplying up to 122 bar (1,770 psi) fuel pressure in the stainless steel common rail fuel rail, five combustion chamber sited direct injection sequential solenoid-controlled fuel injectors, air-guided combustion process, multi-pulse injection with homogeneous mixing, stratified lean-burn operation with excess air at part load, ultra-low sulfur unleaded petrol (ULSP)
ignition system & engine management
Beru longlife spark plugs centrally positioned in combustion chamber, mapped direct ignition with five individual direct-acting single spark coils; Bosch Motronic MED electronic engine control unit (ECU), cylinder-selective knock control via two knock sensors, permanent lambda control
exhaust system
secondary air injection pump for direct injection into exhaust ports to assist cold start operation, cast iron exhaust manifold (with integrated turbocharger), one primary and two secondary high-flow sports catalytic converters, two heated oxygen sensors monitoring pre- and post-primary catalyst exhaust gases (secondary catalysts unmonitored), vacuum-operated map-controlled flap-valve mounted in one rear exhaust silencer tail pipe
dimensions
length: 494 mm (19.4 in), mass: 185 kg (408 lb)
DIN-rated motive power & torque output
228 kW (310 PS; 306 bhp) at 5,400–6,500 rpm (specific power of 91.2 kW (124.0 PS; 122.3 bhp) per litre); 465 N⋅m (343 lbf⋅ft) at 1,600–5,300 rpm; redline: 7,100 rpm – RS Q3
250 kW (340 PS; 335 bhp) at 5,400–6,500 rpm (specific power of 100.8 kW (137.0 PS; 135.2 bhp) per litre); 450 N⋅m (332 lbf⋅ft) at 1,600–5,300 rpm; redline: 7,100 rpm – RS 3, TT RS, RS Q3 (facelift)
265 kW (360 PS; 355 bhp) at 5,400–6,500 rpm (specific power of 106.0 kW (144.1 PS; 142.1 bhp) per litre); 465 N⋅m (343 lbf⋅ft) at 1,600–5,300 rpm; redline: 7,100 rpm – TT RS plus
270 kW (367 PS; 362 bhp) at 5,400–6,500 rpm (specific power of 108.0 kW (146.8 PS; 144.8 bhp) per litre); 465 N⋅m (343 lbf⋅ft) at 1,600–5,300 rpm; redline: 7,100 rpm – RS Q3 performance, RS 3 (2015–)
294 kW (400 PS; 394 bhp) at 5,400–6,500 rpm; (specific power of 117.6 kW (159.9 PS; 157.7 bhp) per litre); 480 N⋅m (354 lbf⋅ft) at 1,600–5,300 rpm; redline: 7,100 rpm – TT RS, RS 3 (2017–), RS Q3 (2019–)
application
Audi quattro concept (2010), Audi RS3 (2010–2013), Audi TT RS (07/2009 –>11/2023), Audi RS Q3 (2013 ->), Audi RS3 (2015 ->), KTM X-Bow GTX (2020 ->), KTM X-Bow GT2 Concept (2020 ->), Cupra Formentor (2021->), Donkervoort D8 GTO (2013-2025)
references
"Potent new Audi TT RS takes five in Geneva". Audi.co.uk. Audi UK. 3 March 2009. Archived from the original on 19 May 2011.
"Audi TT RS World Debut in Geneva". WorldCarFans.com. AUDI AG. 3 March 2009.
"Audi TT RS in Depth – priced at 55,800 euros". WorldCarFans.com. AUDI AG. 29 May 2009.

=== awards ===
was winner of the "2.0-litre 2.5-litre" category in the 2010, 2011, 2012, 2013 and 2014 annual competition for International Engine of the Year.

== EA390 VR6 ==
The VR6 concept as a whole replaces opposing cylinders in a V-arrangement with staggered ones, creating something between an I6 and a V6. By staggering the cylinders, a much tighter V-angle can be achieved, resulting in a tighter form factor and more efficient packaging.

The EA390 was originally a 3.2L cast iron block that was released in 2001 in the European markets, and was used across various Volkswagen, Audi and Porsche vehicles. The engine was derived from earlier smaller 2.8L variants found mainly in various 1990s Volkswagens, such as the Golf and the Corrado. It was later discountined in European markets due to favour of more efficient layouts, despite being one of the more efficient naturally aspirated V-style designs of the time.

Currently, a 2.5 VR6 engine is only available for Chinese market on Volkswagen Teramont and Talagon. It is derived from now retired 3.0 VR6 engine, which also was available in China only.

identification
parts code prefix: 03H, ID Code: DDKA, DPKA
engine displacement & engine configuration
2,492 cc (152.1 cu in) 10.6° VR6; bore x stroke: 81.0 mm × 80.6 mm (3.19 in × 3.17 in), stroke ratio: 1:1 – square-stroke, 415.3 cc per cylinder, compression ratio is not disclosed at the moment.
cylinder block & crankcase
grey cast iron; die-forged steel crankshaft;
cylinder head & valvetrain
cast aluminium alloy; four unequal-length valves per cylinder, 24 valves total, low-friction roller finger cam followers with automatic hydraulic valve clearance compensation, simplex roller chain-driven double overhead camshaft (DOHC – one camshaft for all exhaust valves, and one for all intake valves), continuous timing adjustment variable valve timing (52 degrees on the inlet, 22 degrees on the exhaust)
aspiration
single turbo charger from MHI (Mitsubishi Heavy Industries), hot-film air mass meter, electronic drive by wire throttle valve, two-piece cast aluminium alloy intake manifold, two cast iron exhaust manifolds
fuel system
Fuel Stratified Injection (FSI) high-pressure direct injection with two common rails. DPKA variant has six additional Multipoint Injection (MPI) valves.
DIN-rated motive power & torque outputs, ID codes
220 kW (299 PS; 295 bhp) at 6,000 rpm; 500 N⋅m (369 lbf⋅ft) at 2,750–3,500 rpm - DDKA, DPKA
production
Volkswagen Salzgitter Plant
applications
DDKA: Volkswagen Teramont, Chinese market only, China 5 emission standard.
DPKA: Volkswagen Teramont X, Volkswagen Teramont, Chinese market only, China 6b(stage of PN11 without RDE) emission standard.

== EA837 V6 ==
EA 837 is a V6 produced between 2004 and 2016, it was mainly commercialized under 2.4, 2.8, 3.2 or 3.0 TFSI for its most powerful variant.

engine displacement & engine configuration

These engine produced from 177 to 340 hp, available versions were as follows 2.4, 2.8, 3.2, and 3.0 the last one is supercharged by a Eaton supercharger.

This engine is used by the Audi S4 B8 under CAKA code in its 3.0 TFSI 333 hp version.

== EA839 V6 ==
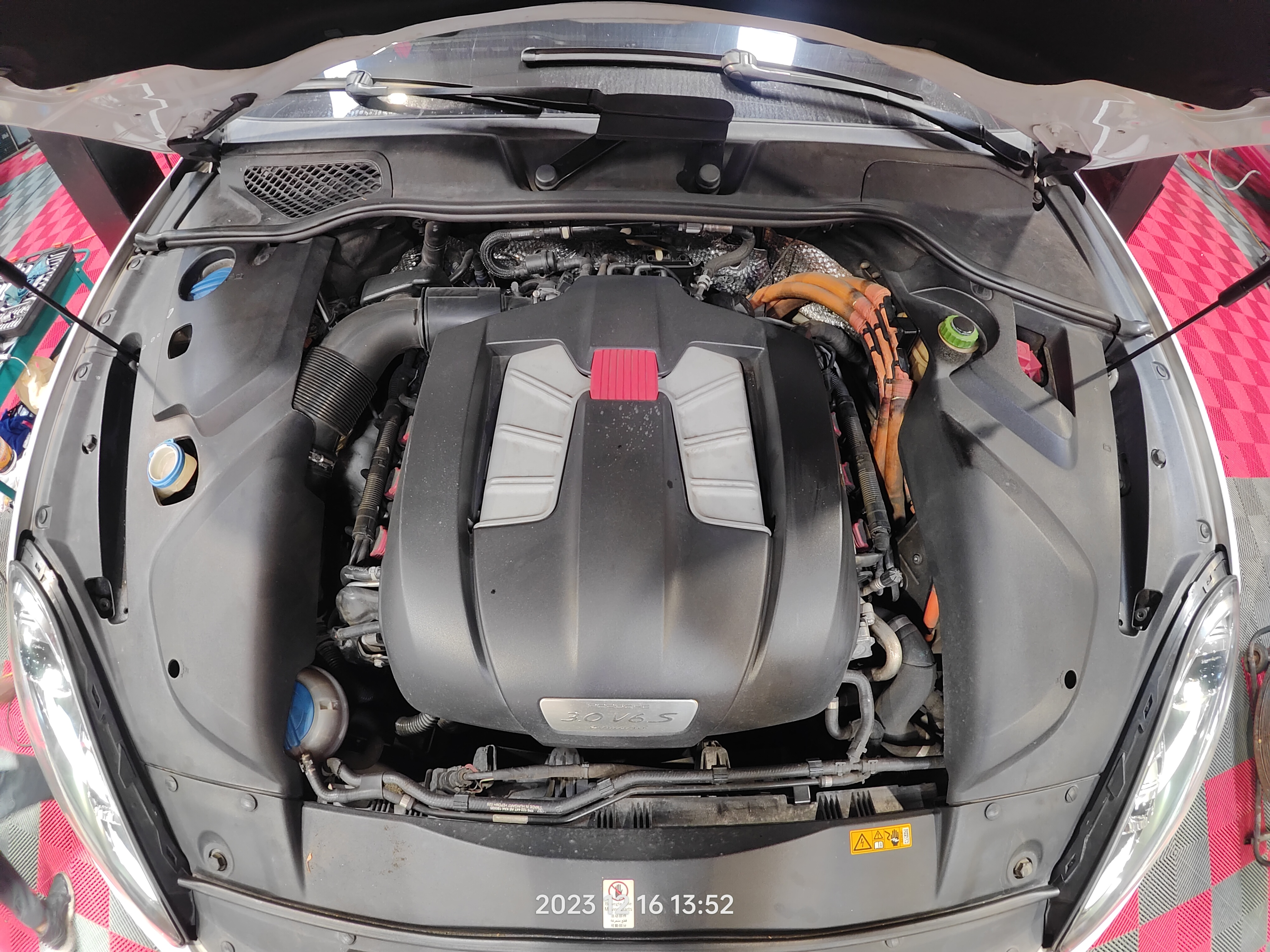
3.0 Supercharged Hybrid Engine

EA839 is a family of turbocharged 90 degrees V6 spark ignition engines. It includes iron cylinder liners, balancer shaft located within the vee, maximum compression ratio of 11.2:1, bore and stroke of 84.5 mm × 89 mm (3.33 in × 3.50 in).

The base engine is the 260 kW (354 PS; 349 bhp) 3.0 TFSI with a twin-scroll turbo, available on Audi S4/S5/SQ5 models. A slightly detuned version (250 kW (340 PS; 335 bhp)) with 48V mild hybrid system is available on various Audi models such as the A6, A7, A8, Q7 and Q8. The 2.9 TFSI engine is a twin-turbo charged high performance variant with shorter stroke. Petrol versions of S6 and S7 (C8), like their diesel powered counter parts, feature an electric supercharger powered by the 48V mild hybrid system in their 2.9 TFSI engines.

identification
parts code prefix:06M-, ID codes: CWGD, CZSE/DR, DECA, DKMB
engine displacement & engine configuration
3.0 TFSI variant: 2,995 cc (182.8 cu in) 90° V6; bore x stroke: 84.5 mm × 89 mm (3.33 in × 3.50 in), stroke ratio: 0.94:1 - undersquare/long-stroke, compression ratio: 11.2:1
2.9 TFSI variant: 2,894 cc (176.6 cu in) 90° V6; bore x stroke: 84.5 mm × 86 mm (3.33 in × 3.39 in), stroke ratio: 0.98:1 - undersquare/long-stroke, compression ratio: 10.0:1 to 10.5:1 depending on models
cylinder block & crankcase
sand-cast Alusil aluminium-silicon alloy; iron cylinder liners
cylinder head & valvetrain
cast aluminium alloy; four valves per cylinder, 24 valves total, DOHC, continuous timing adjustment on both intake and exhaust camshaft(from 130 degrees up to 180 degrees), 2-stage(6mm and 10mm) Audi Valvelift System(AVS) on the intake sides
aspiration
all variants feature both Otto and Miller cycles, achieved from valve timing; hot-film air mass meter; electronic drive by wire throttle valve; exhaust manifold integrated into cylinder head; hot-V configuration
3.0 TFSI: twin-scroll single-turbo charged
2.9 TFSI: twin-turbo charged
fuel system
common rail Fuel Stratified Injection (FSI) high-pressure direct injection
DIN-rated motive power & torque outputs, ID codes

3.0 TFSI variants

243 kW (330 PS; 326 bhp) at 5,400–6,400 rpm; 450 N⋅m (332 lbf⋅ft) at 1,340–4,900 rpm - unknown/Porsche variant
250 kW (340 PS; 335 bhp) at 5,000–6,400 rpm; 500 N⋅m (369 lbf⋅ft) at 1,370–4,500 rpm - CZSE(2017–2018)/DR(2019–)
260 kW (354 PS; 349 bhp) at 5,400–6,400 rpm; 500 N⋅m (369 lbf⋅ft) at 1,370–4,500 rpm - CWGD

2.9 TFSI variants

243 kW (330 PS; 326 bhp) at 5,250–6,500 rpm; 450 N⋅m (332 lbf⋅ft) at 1,750–5,000 rpm - unknown/Porsche variant
324 kW (441 PS; 434 bhp) at 5,650–6,600 rpm; 550 N⋅m (406 lbf⋅ft) at 1,750–5,500 rpm - unknown/Porsche variant
331 kW (450 PS; 444 bhp) at 5,700–6,700 rpm; 600 N⋅m (443 lbf⋅ft) at 1,900–5,000 rpm - DECA, DKMB
production
Audi Hungaria Zrt. in Győr
applications
3.0 TFSI(243 kW (330 PS; 326 bhp)): Porsche Panamera/Panamera 4 (2nd gen)
2.9 TFSI(243 kW (330 PS; 326 bhp)): Porsche Panamera 4 E-Hybrid (2nd gen)
CZSE/DR: Audi A6 (C8), Audi A7 (C8/4K8), Audi A8 (D5), Audi Q8, Porsche Cayenne/Cayenne E-Hybrid (3rd gen), Volkswagen Touareg (3rd gen)
CWGD: Audi S4 (B9, B9.5 excluding European models), Audi S5 (B9/F5, B9.5 excluding European models), Audi SQ5 (FY, excluding European facelited models)
2.9 TFSI(324 kW (441 PS; 434 bhp)): Porsche Panemera 4S (2nd gen), Porsche Cayenne S (3rd gen)
DECA: Audi RS4 (B9), Audi RS5 (B9/F5)
DKMB: Audi S6 (C8, excluding European models), Audi S7 (C8/4K8, excluding European models)
references
audi.de

Audi 3.0l V6 TFSI engine of the EA839 series (PDF). Self Study Programme 655. Audi.

porsche.com
volkswagen.de

== EA825 V8 ==
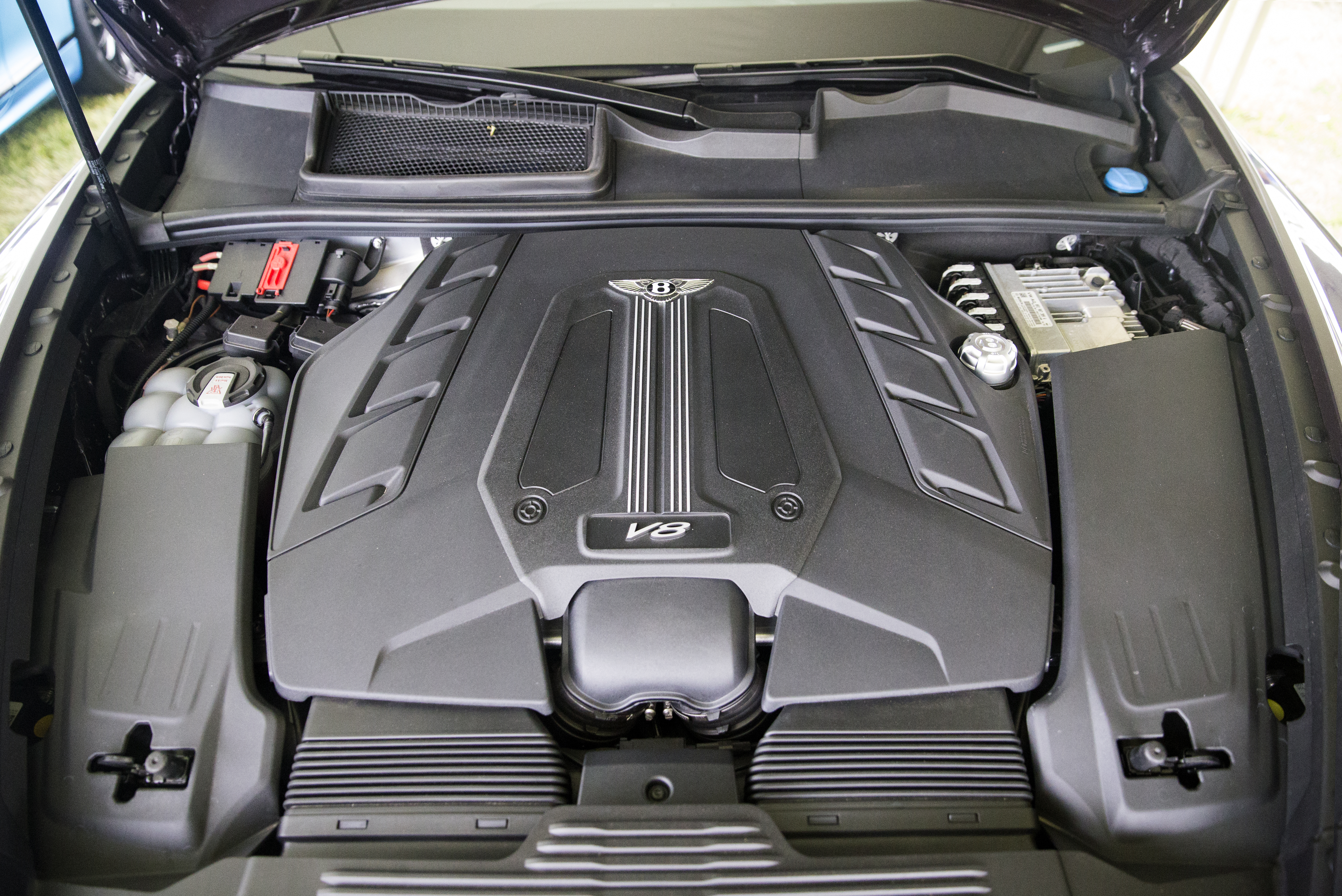
The twin-turbo EA825 in a Bentley Bentayga

EA824 and EA825 are families of twin turbo 90 degrees V8 spark ignition engines.

Audi uses the EA824, while Porsche uses EA825 for Panamera Turbo. Bentley uses this for the Bentayga V8.

EA825 uses two twin-scroll turbochargers, iron coating on the cylinder linings, 250 bar (3,626 psi) fuel injector at centre of combustion chamber, cylinder deactivation at 950–3500rpm with a 250 N⋅m (184 lb⋅ft) torque limit.

Of their eight-cylinder petrol engines, all Volkswagen Group V8 engines are primarily constructed from a lightweight cast aluminium alloy cylinder block (crankcase) and cylinder heads. They all use multi-valve technology, with the valves being operated by two overhead camshafts per cylinder bank (sometimes referred to as 'quad cam'). All functions of engine control are carried out by varying types of Robert Bosch GmbH Motronic electronic engine control units.

These V8 petrol engines initially were only used in cars bearing the Audi marque, but are now also installed in Volkswagen Passenger Cars 'premium models'. They are all longitudinally orientated, and with the exception of the Audi R8, are front-mounted.

This engine is part of Audi's modular 90° V6/V8 engine family. It shares its bore and stroke, 90° V-angle, and 90mm cylinder spacing with the Audi V6. The earlier V6 engines (EA837) used an Eaton TVS Supercharger instead of turbocharger(s). In 2016, Audi and Porsche released a new turbocharged V6 engine they dubbed EA839. These 2.9L (biturbo) & 3.0L (single turbo) V6 engines share the 4.0T TFSI V8's "hot vee" design, meaning the turbo(s) are placed in the Vee of the engine (between each bank of cylinders) instead of on the outside of each cylinder bank. This allows the turbocharger(s) to produce boost pressure more quickly as the path the exhaust gases travel is much reduced. It also aids in getting the engine's emissions hardware up to temperature more quickly. As with the V6, the V8 is used in various Audi and Porsche models, but the V8 also finds use in Bentley and Lamborghini vehicles.

engine displacement & engine configuration
3,993 cc (243.7 cu in) 90° V8 engine; 90 mm (3.54 in) cylinder spacing; bore x stroke: 84.5 mm × 89.0 mm (3.33 in × 3.50 in), stroke ratio: 0.95:1 – undersquare/long-stroke, 499.1 cc per cylinder, compression ratio: 10.5:1
fuel system; Fuel Stratified Injection (FSI)
Central-Overhead Injectors
exhaust system
two twin-scroll turbo chargers and twin air- and water-cooled intercoolers
DIN-rated motive power & torque outputs, ID codes, applications
309 kW (420 PS; 414 bhp) at 5,500 rpm; 550 N⋅m (406 lbf⋅ft) from 1,400 rpm to 5,400 rpm — CEUC: Audi S6 C7, S7, CEUA: A8 D4
320 kW (435 PS; 429 bhp) at 5,800 rpm; 600 N⋅m (443 lbf⋅ft) from 1,400 rpm to 5,300 rpm — CTGA: A8 D4, A8 D5
445 kW (605 PS; 597 bhp) at 6,200 rpm; 700 N⋅m (516 lbf⋅ft) from 1,700 rpm to 5,500 rpm — DDTA: Audi S8 D4 (overboost to 750 Nm), CWUC: Audi RS7 performance(C7), Audi RS6 performance (C7)
412 kW (560 PS; 553 bhp) at 5,700 rpm; 700 N⋅m (516 lbf⋅ft) from 1,750 rpm to 5,500 rpm — CRDB, CWUB: Audi RS6 C7 and RS7 C7
338 kW (460 PS; 453 bhp) at 5,500 rpm; 620 N⋅m (457 lbf⋅ft) from 1,800 rpm to 4,500 rpm — CXYA: A8 D5, CVDD: Porsche Panamera GTS
353 kW (480 PS; 473 bhp) at 5,500 rpm; 620 N⋅m (457 lbf⋅ft) from 1,800 rpm to 4,500 rpm — CVDE: Porsche Panamera GTS (Facelifted)
373 kW (507 PS; 500 bhp) at 6,000 rpm; 660 N⋅m (487 lbf⋅ft) from 1,700 rpm to 5,400 rpm — CMMC, CYCB: Bentley Continental GT V8 and Flying Spur V8
388 kW (528 PS; 520 bhp) at 6,000 rpm; 680 N⋅m (502 lbf⋅ft) at 1,750 rpm to 5,500 rpm — CMMD, CYCA: Bentley Continental GT V8 S
373 kW (507 PS; 500 bhp) at 5,500 rpm; 770 N⋅m (568 lbf⋅ft) from 2,000 rpm to 4,000 rpm —
DCUE, DWRB: Audi SQ7, SQ8
405 kW (551 PS; 543 bhp) from 5,750 rpm to 6,000 rpm; 770 N⋅m (568 lbf⋅ft) from 1,960 rpm to 4,500 rpm — MCV.DA: Porsche Panamera Turbo, Turbo S E-Hybrid, CVDA: Bentley Continental GT V8 (2019–), Flying Spur (2019-)
420 kW (571 PS; 563 bhp) at 6,000 rpm; 800 N⋅m (590 lbf⋅ft) from 2,050 rpm to 4,500 rpm — CWWD, DWKA: Audi S8 D5
420 kW (571 PS; 563 bhp) from 5,750 rpm to 6,000 rpm; 770 N⋅m (568 lbf⋅ft) from 1,960 rpm to 4,500 rpm — CVDA: Porsche Panamera Turbo S E-Hybrid (Facelifted)
441 kW (600 PS; 591 bhp) from 6,000 rpm to 6,250 rpm; 800 N⋅m (590 lbf⋅ft) from 2,050 rpm to 4,500 rpm in Audi RS6 C8 and RS7 C8
441 kW (600 PS; 591 bhp) at 6,000 rpm; 800 N⋅m (590 lbf⋅ft) from 2,200 rpm to 4,500 rpm — DHUB: Audi RS Q8
463 kW (630 PS; 621 bhp) at 6,000 rpm; 850 N⋅m (627 lbf⋅ft) from 2,300 rpm to 4,500 rpm — DYGA: Audi RS6 Avant performance (C8) and RS7 performance (C8)
463 kW (630 PS; 621 bhp) from 5,750 rpm to 6,000 rpm; 820 N⋅m (605 lbf⋅ft) from 1,960 rpm to 4,500 rpm — DTCA: Porsche Panamera Turbo S
478 kW (650 PS; 641 bhp) at 6,000 rpm; 850 N⋅m (627 lbf⋅ft) in Lamborghini Urus
471 kW (640 PS; 632 bhp) at 6,000 rpm; 850 N⋅m (627 lbf⋅ft) — DWNA: Porsche Cayenne Coupé Turbo GT, Audi RSQ8 performance
485 kW (659 PS; 650 bhp) at 6,000 rpm; 850 N⋅m (627 lbf⋅ft) in 2023 facelift version of Porsche Cayenne Coupé Turbo GT

Audi version of the engine includes electronic monitoring of the oil level, while Bentley engine includes a dipstick for oil check. In addition, the Bentley engine uses switchable hydraulic mounts instead of Audi's active electrohydraulic engine mounts.

== V10 ==
This is the second Lamborghini engine developed by AUDI AG, who became owners of Automobili Lamborghini S.p.A. following the takeover of Lamborghini by the German Volkswagen Group. It is a development of Audi's fundamentally identical 5.2 V10 40v FSI engine as used in the Audi C6 S6 and Audi D3 S8. This variant has been de-tuned for the Audi R8 V10.

identification
parts code prefix: 07L.Y
engine displacement & engine configuration
5,204 cc (317.6 cu in) 90° V10 engine; bore x stroke: 84.5 mm × 92.8 mm (3.33 in × 3.65 in), stroke ratio: 0.91:1 – undersquare/long-stroke, 520.4 cc per cylinder; compression ratio: 12.5:1; dry sump lubrication system
cylinder block & crankcase
cast aluminium alloy; 90 mm (3.54 in) cylinder bore spacing; die-forged steel crankshaft with shared crankpins (creating an uneven firing interval of either 54 deg or 90 deg separation)
cylinder heads & valvetrain
cast aluminium alloy; four valves per cylinder, 40 valves total, low-friction roller finger cam followers with automatic hydraulic valve clearance compensation, chain driven double overhead camshafts, continuously variable valve timing system both for intake and exhaust
aspiration
two air filters, two hot-film air mass meters, two cast alloy throttle bodies each with electronically controlled throttle valves, cast magnesium alloy variable geometry and resonance intake manifold
fuel system
fully demand-controlled and returnless; fuel tank–mounted low-pressure fuel pump, Fuel Stratified Injection (FSI): two inlet camshaft double-cam driven single-piston high-pressure injection pumps maintaining pressure in the two stainless steel common rail fuel distributor rails, ten combustion chamber sited direct injection solenoid-controlled sequential fuel injectors
ignition system & engine management
mapped direct ignition with centrally mounted spark plugs and ten individual direct-acting single spark coils; two Bosch Motronic MED 9.1 or Lamborghini LIE electronic engine control units (ECUs) working on the 'master and slave' concept due to the high revving nature of the engine
exhaust system
2-1-2 branch exhaust manifold per cylinder bank to minimise reverse pulsation of expelled exhaust gases
DIN-rated motive power & torque outputs, ID,
applications
Audi — BUJ: 386 kW (525 PS; 518 bhp) at 8,000 rpm; 530 N⋅m (391 lbf⋅ft) at 6,500 rpm — Audi R8 V10 (04/09-07/15)
LP550: 405 kW (551 PS; 543 bhp) at 8,000 rpm; 540 N⋅m (398 lbf⋅ft) at 6,500 rpm — Lamborghini Gallardo LP 550-2
LP560: 412 kW (560 PS; 553 bhp) at 8,000 rpm; 540 N⋅m (398 lbf⋅ft) at 6,500 rpm — Lamborghini Gallardo LP 560-4
LP570: 419 kW (570 PS; 562 bhp) at 8,000 rpm; 540 N⋅m (398 lbf⋅ft) at 6,500 rpm — Lamborghini Gallardo LP 570-4 Superleggera, Spyder Performante, Super Trofeo, Squadra Corse
LP580: 427 kW (581 PS; 573 bhp) at 8,000 rpm; 533 N⋅m (393 lbf⋅ft) at 6,500 rpm — Lamborghini Huracán LP 580-2
LP610: 449 kW (610 PS; 602 bhp) at 8,250 rpm; 560 N⋅m (413 lbf⋅ft) at 6,500 rpm — Lamborghini Huracán LP 610-4, EVO RWD, Audi R8 V10 Plus
LP640: 471 kW (640 PS; 632 bhp) at 8,000 rpm; 601 N⋅m (443 lbf⋅ft), 565 N⋅m (417 lbf⋅ft) for STO and Tecnica, at 6,500 rpm — Lamborghini Huracán LP 640-4 Performante, EVO, STO, Tecnica
references
"Lamborghini Gallardo LP560-4 – New Gallardo V10 bends design rules – Secrets behind Lamborghini's latest projectile, the LP560-4". evo.co.uk. Dennis Publishing. 7 March 2008.
"2012 Lamborghini Gallardo LP 570-4 Spyder Performante". TopSpeed.com. 7 November 2011.
"2010 Lamborghini Gallardo LP570-4 Superleggera". supercars.net.
"Lamborghini gives Gallardo bigger engine, new name". AutoWeek.com. Crain Communications. 26 February 2008. Archived from the original on 28 June 2011.
"Automobil Revue". pp. catalogue edition 2008, p.316 and 2006, p.285.
"The Lamborghini Huracan LP610-4 Is The Most Advanced Lambo Ever". jalopnik.com. Jalopnik. 20 December 2013.

== WR12 ==
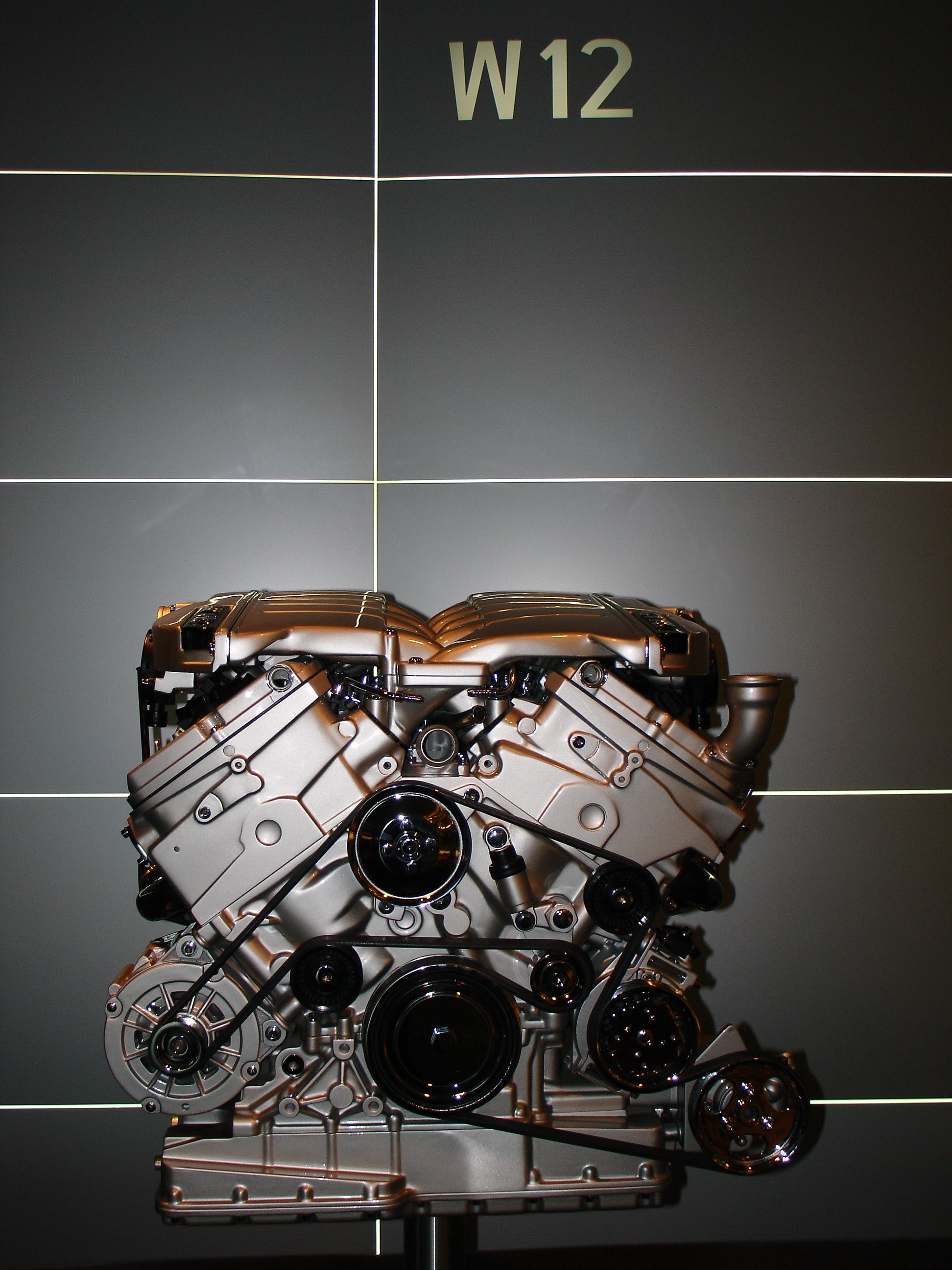
Volkswagen Group W12 engine

This W12 badged W12 engine is a twelve cylinder W engine of four rows of three cylinders, formed by joining two imaginary 15° VR6 engine cylinder blocks, placed on a single crankshaft, with each cylinder 'double-bank' now at a 72° angle. This specific configuration is more appropriately described as a WR12 engine.

This Volkswagen Group engine is also used with slight modification, and with the addition of two turbochargers in the Bentley Continental GT and Bentley Flying Spur. It has also been used in a 600 hp (450 kW; 610 PS) form aboard the Volkswagen W12 prototype sports car to establish a 24-hour record of 323 km/h (200.7 mph) in 2002 at the Nardò Ring in Italy.

The WR12 will be discontinued in April 2024.

identification
parts code prefix: 07C
engine displacement & engine configuration
5,998 cc (366.0 cu in) 72° W12 engine; bore x stroke: 84.0 mm × 90.2 mm (3.31 in × 3.55 in), stroke ratio: 0.93:1 – undersquare/long-stroke, 499.9 cc per cylinder, compression ratio: 10.7:1
cylinder block & crankcase
homogeneous monoblock low-pressure chill die cast hypereutectic 'Alusil' aluminium-silicon alloy (AlSi17Cu4Mg); torsionally stiff aluminium alloy crankcase with high-resistance cylinder liners, simplex roller chain driven oil pump; die-forged steel 21.2 kg crankshaft, seven main bearings, crankpins offset to achieve a constant firing order as on a V6 engine
cylinder heads & valvetrain
cast aluminium alloy; four valves per cylinder, 48 valves total, low-friction roller finger cam followers with automatic hydraulic valve clearance compensation, double overhead camshaft driven from the flywheel side via a two-stage chain drive utilising three 3/8" simplex roller chains, continuous vane-adjustable variable valve timing for intake and exhaust camshafts with up to 52 degrees timing range for the flow-optimised inlet ports, 22 degrees on the exhaust camshafts
aspiration
two air filters, two hot-film air mass meters, two throttle bodies each with electronically controlled Bosch 'E-Gas' throttle valves, four-part two-channel cast magnesium alloy intake manifold; Bentley versions also use twin-turbos – one turbocharger per VR cylinder bank
fuel system, ignition system, engine management
two linked common rail fuel distributor rails, multi-point electronic sequential indirect fuel injection with twelve intake manifold-sited fuel injectors; centrally positioned NGK longlife spark plugs, mapped direct ignition with 12 individual direct-acting single spark coils; Bosch Motronic ME 7.1.1 electronic engine control unit (ECU), cylinder-selective knock control via four knock sensors, permanent lambda control, water-cooled alternator
exhaust system
two vacuum-controlled secondary air injection pumps for direct injection into exhaust ports to assist cold start operation, four exhaust manifolds with four integrated ceramic catalytic converters, eight heated oxygen sensors monitoring pre- and post catalyst exhaust gases
dimensions
length: 513 mm (20.2 in), height: 715 mm (28.1 in), width: 710 mm (28.0 in) then 690 mm (27.2 in)
DIN-rated motive power & torque outputs – Audi / Volkswagen, ID codes
309 kW (420 PS; 414 bhp); 550 N⋅m (406 lbf⋅ft) — Audi A8: AZC (01/01-09/02), VW Phaeton: BAN (04/02-05/05)
331 kW (450 PS; 444 bhp) at 6,200 rpm, 580 N⋅m (430 lbf⋅ft) at 4,000 rpm, 560 N⋅m (413 lbf⋅ft) at 2,300–5,300 rpm — Audi A8: BHT, BSB, BTE (12/03-07/10)
331 kW (450 PS; 444 bhp) at 6,000 rpm; 560 N⋅m (413 lbf⋅ft) at 2,750–5,000 rpm — Phaeton: BRN, BTT (05/05-03/16)
331 kW (450 PS; 444 bhp) at 6,000 rpm; 600 N⋅m (443 lbf⋅ft) at 3,300 rpm — Touareg: BJN, CFRA (08/04-05/10)
DIN-rated motive power & torque outputs – Bentley twin turbo
412 kW (560 PS; 553 bhp) at 6,100 rpm; 650 N⋅m (479 lbf⋅ft) at 1,600–6,100 rpm — standard models: BWR, BEB, MTBHT
449 kW (610 PS; 602 bhp) at 6,000 rpm; 750 N⋅m (553 lbf⋅ft) at 1,700–5,600 rpm — "Speed" models: CKHC, BWRA
applications
Audi A8 (AZC: 03/01-09/02, BHT: 02/04-, BSB: 10/04-, BTE: 02/05-), Volkswagen Phaeton (BAN: 05/02-05/05, BRN: 05/05-10/08, BTT: 05/05-10/08), Volkswagen Touareg sport (BJN: 08/04-, CFRA: 02/08-), Bentley Continental GT, Bentley Flying Spur, Bentley Bentayga
references
"Volkswagen Phaeton – in depth". WorldCarFans.com. Volkswagen AG. 1 March 2002. Archived from the original on 23 April 2013.
"KS Aluminium-Technologie: engine blocks for the new Audi A6". Rheinmetall.de. Rheinmetall AG. August 2004. Archived from the original on 5 October 2012.
"Audi A8L details". WorldCarFans.com. Audi of America. 12 January 2004. Archived from the original on 30 July 2013.
"Continental Flying Spur specification". BentleyMotors.com. Bentley Motors Limited.
"Continental Flying Spur Speed specification". BentleyMotors.com. Bentley Motors Limited.

=== 6.0 WR12 48v TFSI ===
This engine produces 430 kW (585 PS; 577 bhp) of power and 800 N⋅m (590 lbf⋅ft) of torque. It would mostly share the same technical specifications with its turbocharged 6.0-liter predecessor, other than the fact that it was modified to meet new WLTP emission standards. This new engine was promised to be made available on the fourth generation A8, following S8 and 60 TFSI/TDI models. However, as of August 2020, only examples of the W12 variant were press cars. It is rumoured that the W12 variant is only available as special orders in selected European dealerships.

reference
"2018 A8 W12". YouTube. 15 October 2017.

=== 6.3 WR12 48v FSI (CEJA) ===
This engine produces 500 PS (368 kW; 493 bhp) of power and 625 N⋅m (461 lbf⋅ft) of torque. This new engine was promised to be made available on the 3rd generation A8 More compact dimensions than a comparable V8 engine FSI direct injection with twin high-pressure fuel pumps, twin fuel rails and six-port high pressure injectors.

applications
A8 L W12 6.3 FSI quattro (CEJA)

== L539 V12 (Lamborghini) ==
This V12 engine is developed specifically for Lamborghini. The company's fourth in-house engine and their first new V12 since its founding, it made its first appearance in the Lamborghini Aventador.

engine configuration
60° V12 engine; dry sump lubrication system
engine displacement etc.
6.5: 6,498 cc (396.5 cu in); bore x stroke: 95.0 mm × 76.4 mm (3.74 in × 3.01 in), compression ratio: 11.8:1
cylinder block & crankcase
cast aluminium alloy
cylinder heads & valvetrain
cast aluminium alloy; four valves per cylinder, 48 valves total, double overhead camshaft
aspiration
two air filters, four cast alloy throttle bodies each with Magneti Marelli electronically controlled throttle valves, cast magnesium alloy intake manifold
fuel system & ignition system
two linked common rail fuel distributor rails, multi-point electronic sequential indirect fuel injection with twelve intake manifold-sited fuel injectors; centrally positioned spark plugs, mapped direct ignition with 12 individual direct-acting single spark coils
exhaust system
two 3-branch exhaust manifolds per cylinder bank, connected to dual-inlet catalytic converters, heated oxygen (lambda) sensors monitoring pre- and post-catalyst exhaust gases
DIN-rated motive power & torque outputs
LP 700: 515 kW (700 PS; 691 bhp) at 8,250 rpm; and 690 N⋅m (509 lbf⋅ft) at 5,500 rpm
LP 720: 530 kW (721 PS; 711 bhp) at 8,250 rpm; and 690 N⋅m (509 lbf⋅ft) at 5,500 rpm
LP 740: 544 kW (740 PS; 730 bhp) at 8,400 rpm; and 690 N⋅m (509 lbf⋅ft) at 5,500 rpm
LP 750: 552 kW (751 PS; 740 bhp) at 8,400 rpm; and 690 N⋅m (509 lbf⋅ft) at 5,500 rpm
LP 770: 566 kW (770 PS; 759 bhp) at 8,500 rpm; and 720 N⋅m (531 lbf⋅ft) at 6,750 rpm
LP 780: 574 kW (780 PS; 770 bhp) at 8,500 rpm; and 720 N⋅m (531 lbf⋅ft) at 6,750 rpm
LPI 800: 599 kW (814 PS; 803 bhp) at 8,500 rpm; and 720 N⋅m (531 lbf⋅ft) at 6,750 rpm
applications
Lamborghini Aventador LP 700-4 (2011–2022)
Lamborghini Aventador LP 720-4 50º Anniversario (2013)
Lamborghini Veneno LP 750-4 (2013–2014)
Lamborghini Centenario LP 770-4 (2016–2017)
Lamborghini Sián FKP 37 (2020–2022)
Lamborghini Countach LPI 800-4 (2022)
reference
"Lamborghini Aventador Technical Specifications". Lamborghini. Archived from the original on 29 July 2016.
"Lamborghini Aventador 50th Anniversario Technical Specifications". Lamborghini. Archived from the original on 8 February 2015.
"Lamborghini Veneno Roadster Technical Specifications". Lamborghini. Archived from the original on 10 February 2015.

== WR16 (Bugatti) ==
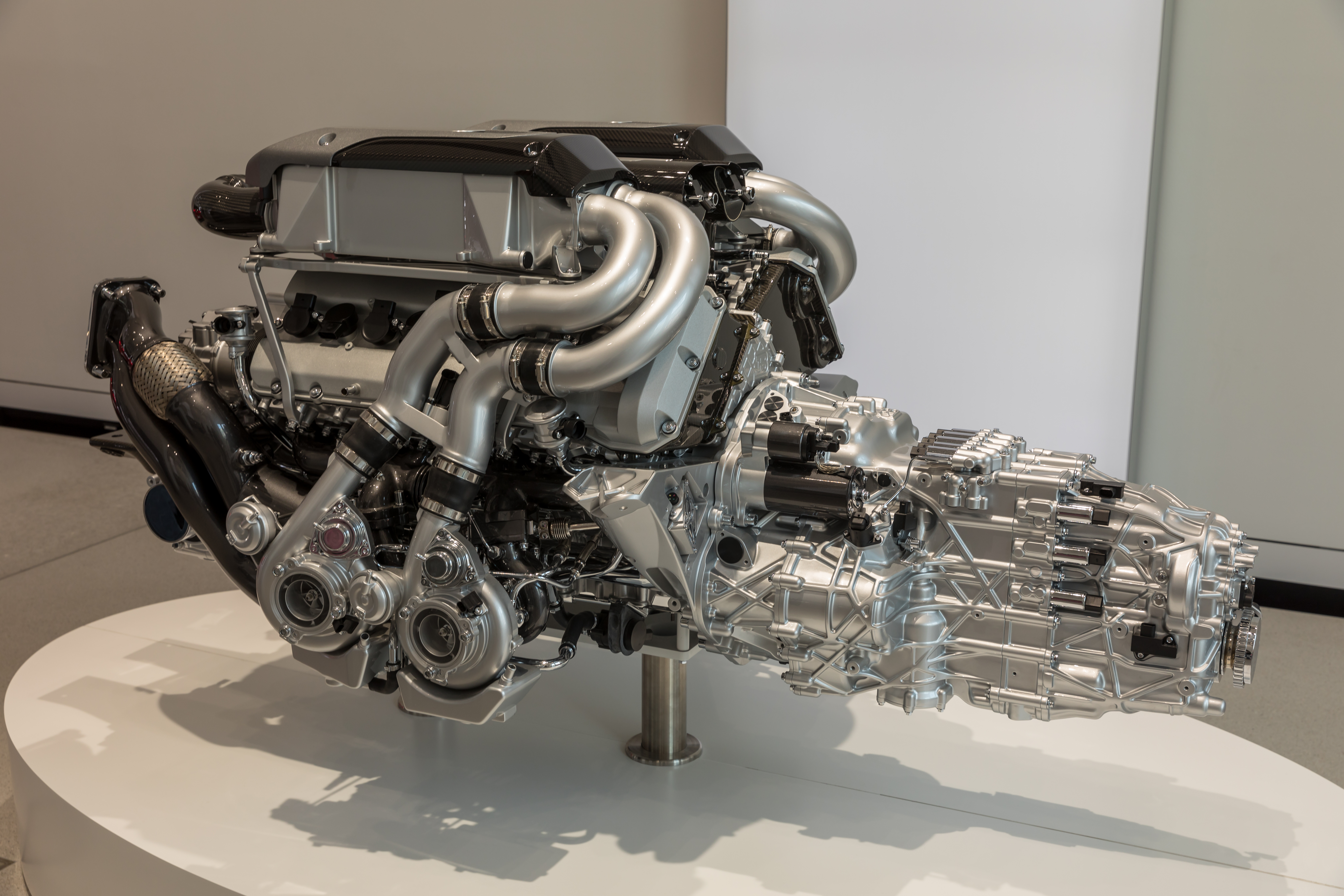
W16 engine of the Bugatti Chiron

This W16 badged engine is the first and so far the only production W16 engine in the world. It is a sixteen-cylinder WR engine, of four rows of four cylinders, and is created by joining two VR8-engine 15° cylinder banks at the crankcase, and placed on a single crankshaft, with each cylinder 'double-bank' now at a 90° V-angle. This specific configuration method means it is more appropriately described as a WR16 engine rather than W16.

The WR16 engine will be discontinued after the production run of the Bugatti Mistral

engine displacement & engine configuration
7,993 cc (487.8 cu in) 90° W16 engine; bore x stroke: 86.0 mm × 86.0 mm (3.39 in × 3.39 in), stroke ratio: 1.00:1 – 'square engine', 499.56 cc per cylinder
cylinder block & crankcase
forged aluminium alloy; plasma-coated cylinder bores, dry sump lubrication system featuring an eight-stage aluminium-geared oil pump, die-forged steel crankshaft, lightweight titanium connecting rods
cylinder heads & valvetrain
cast aluminium alloy; four valves per cylinder, 64 valves total, low-friction roller finger cam followers with automatic hydraulic valve clearance compensation, double overhead camshaft
engine cooling
two separate water cooling circuits: one of 40 L (8.8 imp gal; 10.6 US gal) capacity utilising three front-mounted radiators, the second of 15 L (3.3 imp gal; 4.0 US gal) for cooling the charged induction air in the two intercoolers
aspiration
lightweight cast magnesium alloy intake manifold with twin 'drive by wire' electronically controlled throttle valves in separate throttle bodies, four parallel turbochargers with integrated excess pressure regulation valves, two water-cooled top-mounted intercoolers
fuel system, ignition system & engine management
two linked common rail fuel distributor rails, multi-point electronic sequential indirect fuel injection with sixteen intake manifold-sited fuel injectors; mapped direct ignition with 16 individual direct-acting single spark coils; two digital electronic engine control units (ECUs), ion-current knock control and misfire cylinder-selective detection system
dimensions & mass
length: 710 mm (28.0 in), mass: ˜400 kg (882 lb)
DIN-rated motive power & torque outputs
736 kW (1,001 PS; 987 bhp) at 6,000 rpm; 1,250 N⋅m (922 lbf⋅ft) at 2,200–5,500 rpm; achieving a top speed of 406 km/h (252.3 mph)
882 kW (1,199 PS; 1,183 bhp); 1,500 N⋅m (1,106 lbf⋅ft) – in the Bugatti Veyron Super Sport; achieving a top speed of 430 km/h (267.2 mph)
application

Vehicle	Type	Power Output		
Vehicle	Type	PS	Hp	kW
Bentley Hunaudières	concept	632	623	465
Audi Rosemeyer	concept	710	700	522
Bugatti Veyron (Standard & Grand Sport)	production	1001	987	736
Bugatti Veyron (Super Sport & Grand Sport Vitesse)	production	1201	1184	883
Bugatti 16C Galibier	concept	1001	987	736
Bugatti Vision Gran Turismo	concept	1500	1479	1103
Bugatti Chiron (Standard, Sport, Pur Sport)	production	1500	1479	1103
Bugatti Chiron (Super Sport 300+)	production	1600	1578	1177
Bugatti Divo	production	1500	1479	1103
Bugatti Centodieci	production	1600	1578	1177
Bugatti Bolide	production	1600	1578	1177
Bugatti Chiron Super Sport	production	1600	1578	1177

references
"Photograph of the Bugatti W16 cylinder block" (jpg image).
"2006 Bugatti Veyron W16 Engine". SuperCarNews.net. Bugatti Automobiles S.A.S. Archived from the original on 15 June 2008.
"Bugatti Veyron 16.4 powerplant". WorldCarFans.com. Bugatti Automobiles S.A.S. 2 February 2006. Archived from the original on 30 July 2013.
"Bugatti Veyron 16.4 Super Sport revealed". WorldCarFans.com. Bugatti Automobiles S.A.S.

== Petrol engines data table ==
The following table contains a very brief selection of current and historical Volkswagen Group spark-ignition petrol engines for comparison of performance and operating characteristics:

engine model	engine disp.: (cc)	engine config.	valvetrain	max. power: kW (PS)	rpm for max. power	torque at max. power: Nm	max. torque: Nm (ft·lbf)	rpm for max. torque	power at max. torque: kW	specific power: kW/L (PS/L)	max MEP: bar	MEP at max. power: bar	max operating revs: rpm	dates installed (all unless PS stated in 1st col.)
1.0 MPI	999	inline 3 (R3)	12v DOHC	55 (75)	6,200	85	95 (70)	3,000– 4,300	43	55.1 (75.1)	12	10.7		
1.2 TSI 8v	1,197	inline 4 (R4)	8v SOHC	77 (105)	5,000	119	175 (129)	1,500– 4,100	75	64.3 (87.7)	18.4	12.5		
1.4 TSI	1,390	inline 4 (R4)	16v DOHC	125 (170)	6,000	199	240 (177)	1,750– 4,500	113	89.9 (122.3)	21.7	18	7,000	
1.6 FSI	1,598	inline 4 (R4)	16v DOHC	85 (116)	6,000	135	155 (114)	4,500	73	53.2 (72.6)	12.2	10.6	6,500	
1.8 20vT; Audi TT Sport	1,781	inline 4 (R4)	20v DOHC	176 (239)	5,700	295	320 (236)	2,300– 5,000	168	98.8 (134.2)	22.6	20.8		
2.0 TFSI	1,984	inline 4 (R4)	16v DOHC	147 (200)	5,100– 6,000	234	280 (207)	1,800– 5,000	147	74.1 (100.8)	17.7	14.8	7,000	
2.2 T Audi RS2	2,226	inline 5 (R5)	20v DOHC	232 (315)	6,500	341	410 (302)	3,000	129	104.2 (141.5)	23.1	19.3	7,000	
2.5 (Americas)	2,480	inline 5 (R5)	20v DOHC	125 (170)	5,700	209	240 (177)	4,250	107	44.4 (60.5)	12.2	10.6	5,800	
2.5 TFSI; Audi TT RS	2,480	inline 5 (R5)	20v DOHC	250 (340)	5,400– 6,500	367	450 (332)	1,600– 5,300	250	100.8 (137.1)	22.8	18.6	6,800	
2.7 V6 biturbo Audi RS4 (B5)	2,671	V6 engine	30v DOHC	280 (381)	6,100	438	440 (325)	2,500	115	104.8 (142.6)	20.7	20.6		
2.8 V6	2,771	V6 engine	30v DOHC	142 (193)	6,000	226	275 (203)	3,200	92	51.2 (69.6)	12.5	10.2		
2.8 VR6	2,792	VR6 engine	24v DOHC	150 (204)	6,200	231	265 (195)	3,400	94	53.7 (73.1)	11.9	10.4		
3.0 V6 TFSI; Audi S4 (B8)	2,995	V6 engine	24v DOHC	245 (333)	5,500– 7,000	334	440 (325)	2,500– 5,000	230	81.7 (111.1)	18.5	14		
3.2 VR6	3,189	VR6 engine	24v DOHC	184 (250)	6,300	279	320 (236)	2,500– 3,000	101	57.7 (77.5)	12.6	11		
3.6 VR6 FSI	3,598	VR6 engine	24v DOHC	220 (299)	6,600	318	350 (258)	2,400– 5,300	194	61.1 (83.1)	12.2	11.1		
4.0 V8 TFSI; Audi RS6 (C7)	3,993	V8 engine	32v DOHC	425 (578)	5,700	712	700 (516)	1,750– 5500	403	106.4 (144.7)	22	22.4		
4.0 W8 Volkswagen Passat (B5.5)	3,998	WR8 engine	32v DOHC	202 (275)	6,000	321	370 (273)	2,750	107	50.5 (68.8)	11.6	10.1	6,400	
4.2 V8 40v Audi S4 (B6)	4,163	V8 engine	40v DOHC	253 (344)	7,000	345	410 (302)	3,500	150	60.8 (82.6)	12.4	10.4	7,000	
4.2 V8 FSI 32v Audi RS4 (B7)	4,163	V8 engine	32v DOHC	309 (420)	7,800	378	430 (317)	5,500	248	74.2 (100.9)	13	11.4	8,250	
4.2 V8 biturbo Audi RS6 (C5)	4,172	V8 engine	40v DOHC	353 (480)	6,000– 6,400	527	560 (413)	1,950– 6,000	352	84.6 (115.1)	16.9	15.9		
5.0 V10 TFSI; Audi RS6 (C6)	4,991	V10 engine	40v DOHC	427 (581)	6,250– 6,700	609	650 (480)	1,500– 6,250	425	85.6 (116.4)	16.4	15.3		
5.2 V10 FSI; Audi S8 (D3)	5,204	V10 engine	40v DOHC	331 (450)	7,000	452	540 (398)	3,500	198	63.6 (85.3)	13	10.9	9,000	
6.0 W12; Audi A8	5,998	WR12 engine	48v DOHC	331 (450)	6,200	510	560 (413)	2,300– 5,300	311	55.2 (75.0)	11.7	10.7	6,000	
6.5 V12; Lamborghini Aventador	6,498	V12 engine	48v DOHC	510 (700)	8,250	590	690 (509)	5,500	397	78.4 (107.7)	13.3	11.4		
6.75 V8; Bentley Mulsanne	6,748	V8 engine	16v OHV	395 (537)	4,200		1050 (774)	3,300		58.5 (79.6)			4,500	
8.0 W16 4T; Bugatti Veyron	7,993	WR16 engine	64v DOHC	736 (1001)	6,000	1171	1250 (922)	2,200– 5,500	720	92.1 (125.2)	19.7	18.4		
8.0 W16 4T; Bugatti Chiron	7,993	WR16 engine	64v DOHC	1103 (1,500)	6,000		1600 (1180)	2,000– 6,000		137.1 (187.6)				
engine model	engine disp.: (cc)	engine config.	valvetrain	max. power: kW (PS)	rpm for max. power	torque at max. power: Nm	max. torque: Nm (ft·lbf)	rpm for max. torque	power at max. torque: kW	specific power: kW/L (PS/L)	max MEP: bar	MEP at max. power: bar	max operating revs: rpm	dates installed (all unless PS stated in 1st col.)

== See also ==
- List of Volkswagen Group diesel engines
- Volkswagen Wasserboxer engine
- VR6 engine
- G-Lader
- G60 – for detailed development info and progression of forced induction in Volkswagen Group engines
