= Volkswagen Concept BlueSport =

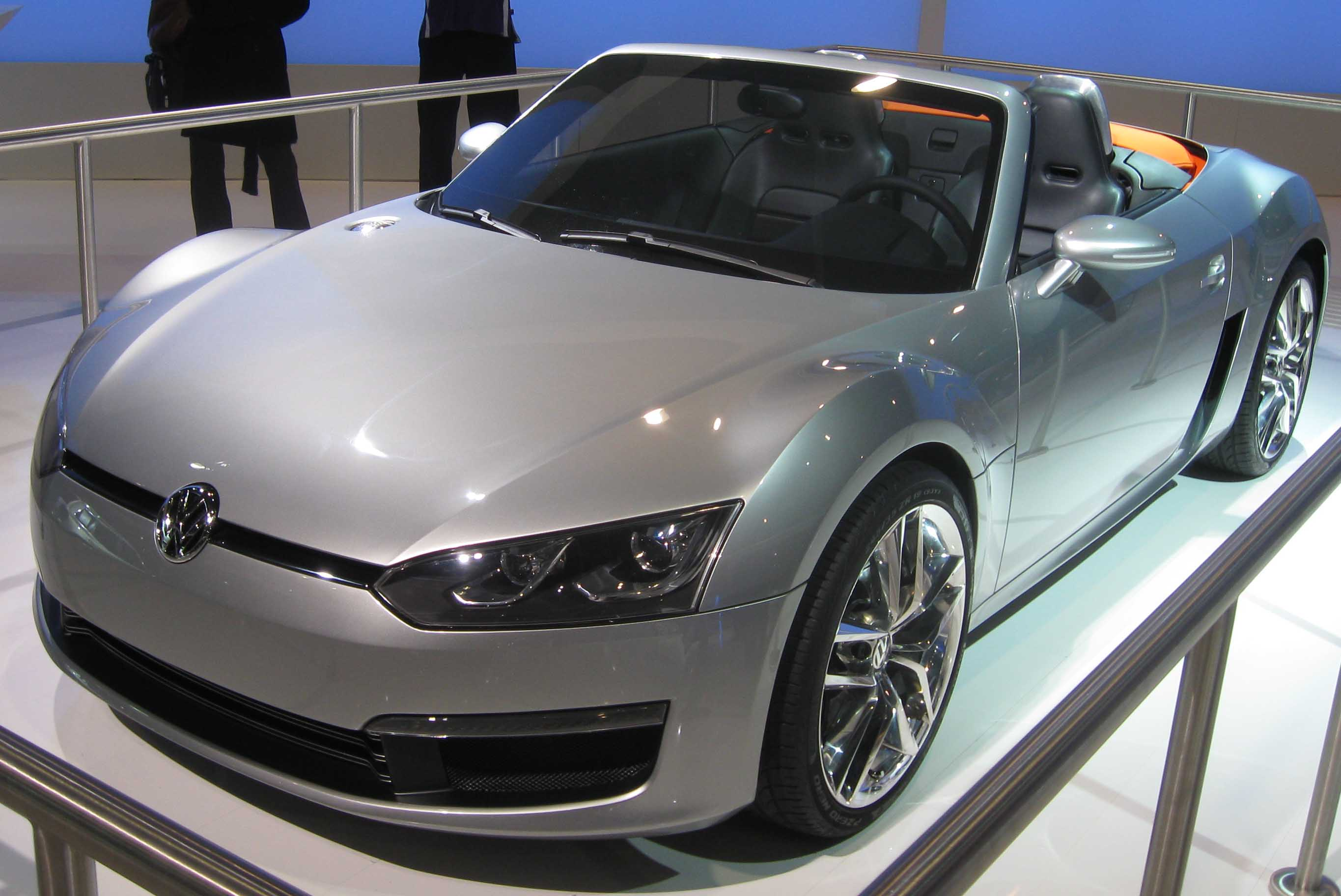

Overview
- Manufacturer: Volkswagen
- Production: 2009
- Designer: Klaus Bischoff; Thomas Ingenlath; Peter Wouda; Romulus Rost

Body and chassis
- Class: Concept car
- Body style: 2-door roadster
- Layout: MR layout
- Related: Audi e-tron

Powertrain
- Engine: 2.0 L (120 cu in) TDI I4
- Transmission: 6-speed DSG

Dimensions
- Wheelbase: 2,430 mm (95.7 in)
- Length: 3,990 mm (157.1 in)
- Width: 1,745 mm (68.7 in)
- Height: 1,260 mm (49.6 in)
- Curb weight: 2,600 lb (1,179 kg)

The Volkswagen Concept BlueSport is a mid-engined roadster concept car produced as a prototype by Volkswagen. It was introduced at the 2009 North American International Auto Show in Detroit. The Concept BlueSport follows on from a previous roadster concept car, the Volkswagen Concept R, shown at the 2003 Frankfurt Motor Show.

== Specifications and performance ==
The Concept BlueSport is powered by a 2.0 L (120 cu in) TDI I4 producing around 180 hp (134 kW) and 260 lb⋅ft (353 N⋅m). A six speed dual clutch DSG gearbox helps give it an estimated 0 to 60 mph (97 km/h) time of 6.2 sec, and a top speed of 140 mph (225 km/h).

== Production ==
It has been reported that a production BlueSport model has been under development, based on a platform, codenamed Mimo (for Mittelmotor, or mid engine) or 9X1, to be shared between the Volkswagen Group marques Volkswagen, Audi and Porsche. The Audi version, related to the Audi e-tron Detroit concept car, may be named Audi R4 or R5. As of 2026, there have been no Concept BlueSport cars produced nor sold.

A Porsche variant is speculated to be a "spiritual successor" to the Porsche 356 roadster, positioned below the current Boxster, as the company's entry-level model.

== See also ==
- Christian Felske
