= Christian Felske =

German car designer

Christian Felske is a German car designer who is credited with the Volkswagen BlueSport concept.
