= Volkswagen Concept R =

Overview
- Manufacturer: Volkswagen

Powertrain
- Engine: V6 3.2 L FSI petrol engine
- Transmission: six-speed direct-shift gearbox

Dimensions
- Length: 4,160 mm (163.8 in)
- Width: 1,780 mm (70.1 in)
- Height: 1,250 mm (49.2 in)

The Volkswagen Concept R is a concept car developed by the German automaker Volkswagen and officially unveiled at the September 2003 Frankfurt Auto Show. It is a study of a sporty two-seat roadster, with mid-engine and rear-wheel drive. The Concept R is powered by a V6 3.2 L FSI petrol engine developing a maximum output of 265 PS (195 kW; 261 hp) at 6,250 rpm and 320 N⋅m (240 ft⋅lbf) of torque at 2,800 rpm.

It is strong enough to accelerate the car from 0 to 100 km/h in 5.3 seconds, and make it reach the electronically limited top speed of 250 km/h (155 mph). Without the speed governor, the car would be even able to reach the top speed of 270 km/h (167 mph). The power is transferred to the road via a six-speed direct-shift gearbox.

The designer team for this concept was led by Murat Günak and Peter Schreyer, and broke the ground for the Volkswagen brand in developing the roadster vehicle. At 162 inches (4,100 mm) of length, 69 inches (1,800 mm) of width and 48 inches (1,200 mm) of height, the Concept R roadster has almost the same length and width as the fifth-generation Volkswagen Golf hatchback, on whose platform it has been built.

The concept includes some design features such as the Volkswagen logo, which is generated digitally by a display and begins to pulsate in the OLED screen when the driver turns on the ignition. When the ignition is activated, the pulse stops.

Also, its seats are not adjustable in any way and the driver must electrically move the polished metal information block of the instrument panel, including the steering wheel and pedal cluster back or forth to find the correct seating position. For the first time in a sports car, the seats are filled with active foam, which adapts to the body shape of the driver and passenger.

At a press dinner held during the 2005 North American International Auto Show, Bernd Pischetsrieder, the chairman of the Volkswagen Group, confirmed that Volkswagen intended to build a production vehicle similar to this concept. As of April 2026, no production model has appeared; however, another similar concept car, the Volkswagen Concept BlueSport, was unveiled at the 2009 North American International Auto Show.

== External links and references ==
- RSportsCars.com - with story and both exterior and interior pictures
- Dr. Pischetsrieder confirms Concept R production - from VWvortex
