= Volkswagen Audi Group AMB Engine =

The AMB series engine was an inline 4-cylinder engine, manufactured from 2001 to 2003 by the Volkswagen Group in Ingolstadt, Germany as a replacement for the earlier 1.8T engines, such as the AEB-type engine. As opposed to the AEB, the AMB had thinner wrist pins (19 mm instead of 20 mm). The AMB engine was used in a variety of Volkswagens and Audis, as well as being used by companies owned by Volkswagen, such as the Spanish car manufacturer, SEAT. The engine was available in a wide variety of configurations and was mounted longitudinally in most Audi applications, and horizontally in most other applications. The engine came coupled with a variety of transmissions including a 5- or 6-speed manual, a 5-speed automatic, and a CVT (continuously variable transmission) for front-wheel drive vehicles only. The engine was also coupled with Audi's Quattro all-wheel drive. In 2003 it was replaced by slightly higher powered versions such as the AUM.

== Specifications ==
The AMB had a DOHC setup featuring 5 valves per cylinder. There were three intake valves and two exhaust valves per cylinder. This design allowed the cylinder to fill with fuel and air quickly during the intake stroke, and purge exhaust quickly during the exhaust stroke thereby increasing efficiency. The engine got its power from a BorgWarner K03 series turbocharger, and multi-port electronic fuel injection. The engine was fired by platinum spark plugs that were coordinated by an electronic ignition system with a separate ignition pack directly connected to each plug. Since it is a hot-running turbocharged engine, the block was made from cast iron to handle heat and pressure. The connecting rods and crank shaft are sintered steel. The engine is designed to handle higher power than it is tuned for because many of the same components are shared with models producing upwards of 220 bhp (164 kW; 223 PS), such as the AMU-type engine

Power	161 bhp (120 kW; 163 PS)
Torque	163 lb⋅ft (221 N⋅m)
Boost Pressure	8.7 psi (0.60 bar)
Valves	20; 5/cylinder
Displacement	1.8Liters
Bore	81 mm (3.2 in)
Stroke	86.4 mm (3.4 in)
Rod Length	144 mm (5.7 in)
