= Ishfaq Nadeem Ahmad =

Pakistani Chief of General Staff (died 2021)

Lieutenant General Ishfaq Nadeem Ahmad HI(M)
- اشفاق ندیم احمد

Commander II Corps
- In office April 2015 – 13 December 2016
- Succeeded by: Sarfraz Sattar

Chief of General Staff Pakistan Army
- In office 29 November 2013 – April 2015
- Preceded by: Rashad Mahmood
- Succeeded by: Zubair Mahmood Hayat

Personal details
- Born: 1959 Neela, Chakwal, Pakistan
- Died: 24 September 2021 (aged 62) Islamabad, Pakistan
- Resting place: H-8, Islamabad, Pakistan
- Education: St Mary's Cambridge School; Pakistan Military Academy; Staff College, Camberley; Quaid-e-Azam University (MSc); Industrial College of the Armed Forces (MSc)

Military service
- Branch/service: Pakistan Army
- Years of service: 1980-2016
- Rank: Lieutenant General
- Unit: Azad Kashmir Regiment
- Commands: II Corps; Chief of General Staff; Azad Kashmir Regiment
- Battles/wars: Insurgency in Khyber Pakhtunkhwa; Operation Rah-e-Rast; Operation Rah-e-Nijat; Operation Zarb-e-Azb; Operation Zarb-e-Ahan

Ishfaq Nadeem Ahmad (Note: Urdu: اشفاق ندیم احمد; Sometimes spelled Ashfaq Nadeem Ahmed or Ishfaq Nadeem Ahmed.) (1959 — 24 September 2021) was a retired three-star rank general who served as the Chief of General Staff of the Pakistan Army from November 2013 to April 2015. He was described as the mastermind of the military Operation Zarb-e-Azb. He later became a businessman and was elected as the 10th Managing Director of Mari Petroleum, serving from 2017 to 2020.

== Early life ==
Ishfaq Nadeem Ahmad was born in Neela, Chakwal in 1959. His father, Ahmed Khan Qureshi, was an engineer at Radio Pakistan.

Ahmad and his brothers attended the St Mary's Cambridge School in Rawalpindi.

== Personal life ==
Ahmad had two brothers, Professor Dr Irfan Salim Ahmed, executive director of the Center for Nanoscale Science and Technology at the University of Illinois (died 2024) and Imran Naeem Ahmed, a journalist who is the co-founder of Journalism Pakistan.

Ishfaq and his wife Asma have one child, Sarmad Ishfaq.

== Military career ==
Ishfaq Nadeem Ahmad joined the Junior Cadet Battalion — I of the Pakistan Military Academy. He was commissioned into the Pakistan Army in 1980 from the 62nd Long Course of the Academy.

As a Lieutenant Colonel, Ahmad was a faculty member at the Command and Staff College, Quetta. He later commanded an infantry battalion and an infantry brigade. He was also on the Directing Staff of the National Defence University and the Chief of Staff of the Strike Corps in Mangla as a Brigadier.

Ahmad graduated from Quaid-i-Azam University with a Master of Science in War Studies in 2002 and subsequently earned a Master of Science in National Resource Strategy from the Industrial College of the Armed Forces in 2006.

In May 2009, Ishfaq was promoted to the rank of Major General. He was appointed General Officer Commanding Swat on 4 July 2009 and assumed duty on 14 August 2009.

Major General Ishfaq Nadeem served as the Director General of Military Operations from April 2011 to 8 August 2013. He condemned the 2011 NATO attack in Pakistan which killed 24 Pakistani soldiers and injured 12. The Express Tribune said that Ishfaq "went so far as to call the attack deliberate." On 9 August 2013, he was promoted to the rank of Lieutenant General.

On 29 November 2013, the new Chief of Army Staff General Raheel Sharif appointed Ishfaq Nadeem Ahmad as the Chief of General Staff. He was appointed as the Colonel Commandant of the Azad Kashmir Regiment in January 2014.

He was appointed as Commander II Corps in April 2015. He oversaw the preparation of Operation Zarb-e-Ahan against the Chotu gang in April 2016. He handed over command of the corps to Lt. General Sarfraz Sattar on 14 December 2016.

=== Chief of Army Staff prospect ===
In November 2016, General Ishfaq Nadeem Ahmed was the second most senior officer in the race for the position of the Chief of Army Staff and was superseded by the most junior officer, Lt General Qamar Javed Bajwa. Bajwa was appointed by Prime Minister Nawaz Sharif, who wanted someone that was a "military expert" and "pro-democracy". Rana Banerji, a fellow at the Institute Of Peace and Conflict Studies, said that though Ishfaq had been reputed to be the most efficient, he was regarded as "too brusque and blunt".

General Ishfaq was set to retire in August 2017, but he quit on 14 December 2016.

== Business career ==
Ishfaq Nadeem Ahmad was appointed as the Managing Director and Chief Executive Officer of Mari Petroleum on 24 January 2017 with effect from 26 January. In this role, he established a domestic hockey team and stadium in September 2018. He served until 11 August 2020.

== Death ==
Ishfaq Nadeem Ahmad died from cardiac arrest at his residence on the morning of 24 September 2021 and was taken to the hospital where he was pronounced dead. He was buried in the graveyard of H-8, Islamabad.

After his death, it was reported that the Pakistan Hockey Federation was considering honouring his contributions to hockey. By October 2023, the hockey stadium in Rawalpindi was renamed after him.
