= Nilu =

Nilu (Persian: نيلو) may refer to:

- Nilu, Fars
- Nilu, Gilan
- Nilu Pardeh Sar, Gilan Province

NILU or Nilu may refer to:

- Nilu27, a sports car project
- Norwegian Institute for Air Research
- Nilou (Chinese:妮露, pinyin:Nīlù), a character in Genshin Impact

== See also ==
- Nellu (disambiguation)
- Nila (disambiguation)
- Neelu (disambiguation)
- Nilu Phule (1930-2009), Indian actor
- Neeloo, Nilima, Nilofar, a 2000 Hindi novel by Indian writer Bhisham Sahni
