= Neela (disambiguation) =

Neela is a feminine given name

Neela may also refer to:

- Neela (film), 2001 Indian Kannada-language film
- Neela Tele Films, an Indian television production house
- Neela, Chakwal, Pakistan, a village

== See also ==
- Nila (disambiguation)
- Neelam (disambiguation)
- Nilam (disambiguation)
