= Neelu (disambiguation) =

Neelu (1936–2018) was an Indian actor in Tamil cinema.

Neelu may also refer to:

- Neelu Mishra, Indian athlete
- Neelu Kohli, Indian actress
- Neelu Rohmetra, Indian academic
- Neelu Vaghela (born 1970), Indian actress

== See also ==
- Nilu (disambiguation)
- Nellu (disambiguation)
- Nila (disambiguation)
- Nilu Phule (1930s–2009), Marathi actor
- Neeloo, Nilima, Nilofar, a 2000 Hindi novel by Indian writer Bhisham Sahni
