= Alexander Selipanov =

Russian automotive designer (born 1983)

- Born: 1983 (age 42–43); Tbilisi, Georgian SSR, Soviet Union
- Citizenship: German
- Education: ArtCenter College of Design
- Spouse: Inna Selipanov
- Children: Nica Selipanov; Lucia Selipanov
- Engineering career
- Discipline: Automotive design
- Institutions: Volkswagen Group (2005–2016); Bugatti Automobiles (2014–2016); Genesis (2017–2019); Koenigsegg (2019–2023); Hardline27 (2023–present)
- Practice name: Hardline27
- Significant design: Lamborghini Huracán; Bugatti Vision Gran Turismo; Bugatti Chiron; Genesis Essentia Concept; Genesis Mint Concept; Koenigsegg Gemera; Koenigsegg CC850; Nilu27

Alexander Selipanov (born 1983), widely known as Sasha Selipanov, is an automotive designer known for his work on hypercars, including the Lamborghini Huracán, the Bugatti Chiron, the Koenigsegg Gemera, and his own independent hypercar, the Nilu27. He is the founder of Hardline27, a design and branding studio, and of Nilu27, his personal hypercar venture.

== Early life ==
Alexander Selipanov was born in 1983 in Tbilisi, then part of the Georgian Soviet Socialist Republic of the Soviet Union. He spent his early childhood in the city, which he still inhabited when Georgia declared independence in 1991 and fell into civil war. As a seven-year-old, he sheltered with his family in their central Tbilisi apartment while fighting raged in the streets around them.

It was during this period that he encountered a photograph of a Ferrari Formula One car bearing the number 27 in a car magazine at his grandparents' home. The image sparked a lifelong obsession with automotive design, and the number 27 would later become a recurring motif throughout his career and personal branding. He subsequently grew up in Russia, where access to Western sports cars was extremely limited, and absorbed every car magazine or catalog he could find.

== Education ==
Selipanov studied Transportation Design at ArtCenter College of Design in Pasadena, California, graduating in 2005. During his studies he completed internships at Mazda in 2003 and Volkswagen in 2004. While still a student in 2004, he cold-emailed Christian von Koenigsegg, expressing admiration for the company — a connection that would prove significant over a decade later.

== Career ==
=== Volkswagen Group (2005–2016) ===
After graduating, Selipanov joined the Volkswagen Group Design Center in Potsdam, Germany, where he worked across multiple brands including Volkswagen, Audi, SEAT, Škoda, and Bentley. Finding corporate interior design work unfulfilling, he maintained a personal website called Angrycardesigner.com where he posted unsolicited exterior concept designs, including a reimagined Ferrari 612 GTO and a Ferrari LMP1 prototype, which gained significant attention in automotive design circles.

When Lamborghini asked the Volkswagen design team to pitch concepts for a new supercar, Selipanov lobbied to submit an exterior proposal. His sketch caught the attention of a senior executive, and he was sent to Lamborghini's headquarters in Sant'Agata Bolognese, Italy. That car became the Lamborghini Huracán, launched in 2014.

In 2014, he was appointed Head of Exterior Design at Bugatti Automobiles in Molsheim, France, where he led the exterior design of the Bugatti Vision Gran Turismo concept, presented at the 2015 Frankfurt Motor Show, and the Bugatti Chiron, unveiled at the 2016 Geneva Motor Show.

=== Genesis (2017–2019) ===
In January 2017, Selipanov joined Genesis, Hyundai Motor Company's luxury brand, as Chief Designer of the Global Genesis Advanced Studio in Rüsselsheim, Germany. In this role he led design on the Genesis Essentia Concept, presented at the 2018 New York International Auto Show, and the Genesis Mint Concept, helping to establish the visual identity of the nascent luxury brand.

=== Koenigsegg (2019–2023) ===
In 2019, Selipanov joined Koenigsegg as Head of Design, working closely with founder Christian von Koenigsegg. He served as lead designer on the Koenigsegg Gemera, a four-seat grand tourer unveiled in 2020, and the Koenigsegg CC850, a limited-edition tribute to the original CC8S revealed in 2022.

=== Hardline27 and Nilu27 (2023–present) ===
In 2023, Selipanov and his wife Inna founded Hardline27, an independent design and branding studio with offices in Berlin and Los Angeles.

In 2024, Selipanov unveiled the Nilu27, his own hypercar. The name is a portmanteau of the names of his two daughters, Nica and Lucia. The car is powered by a naturally aspirated 6.5-litre V12 engine developed by Hartley Engines of New Zealand, paired with a 7-speed manual transmission and targeting over 1,000 horsepower. The first 15 units are priced at $3.7 million each.

== Design philosophy ==
Selipanov has consistently advocated for designs driven by function, aerodynamics, and engineering logic rather than fashion trends. He is skeptical of artificial intelligence as a creative tool, arguing it can generate imagery but not genuinely original ideas. He has been critical of what he describes as the "fashionization" of car design — the tendency to chase contemporary aesthetic trends at the expense of timeless form.

== Personal life ==
Selipanov is married to Inna Selipanov, who co-founded Hardline27 and Nilu27 with him. They have two daughters, Nica and Lucia, after whom the Nilu27 hypercar is named. He currently resides in Manhattan Beach, California.

== Selected works ==
- Lamborghini Huracán (2014) — Lead Exterior Designer
- Bugatti Vision Gran Turismo (2015) — Head of Exterior Design
- Bugatti Chiron (2016) — Head of Exterior Design
- Genesis Essentia Concept (2018) — Chief Designer
- Genesis Mint Concept (2019) — Chief Designer
- Koenigsegg Gemera (2020) — Head of Design
- Koenigsegg CC850 (2022) — Head of Design
- Nilu27 (2024) — Founder and Designer

== Gallery ==
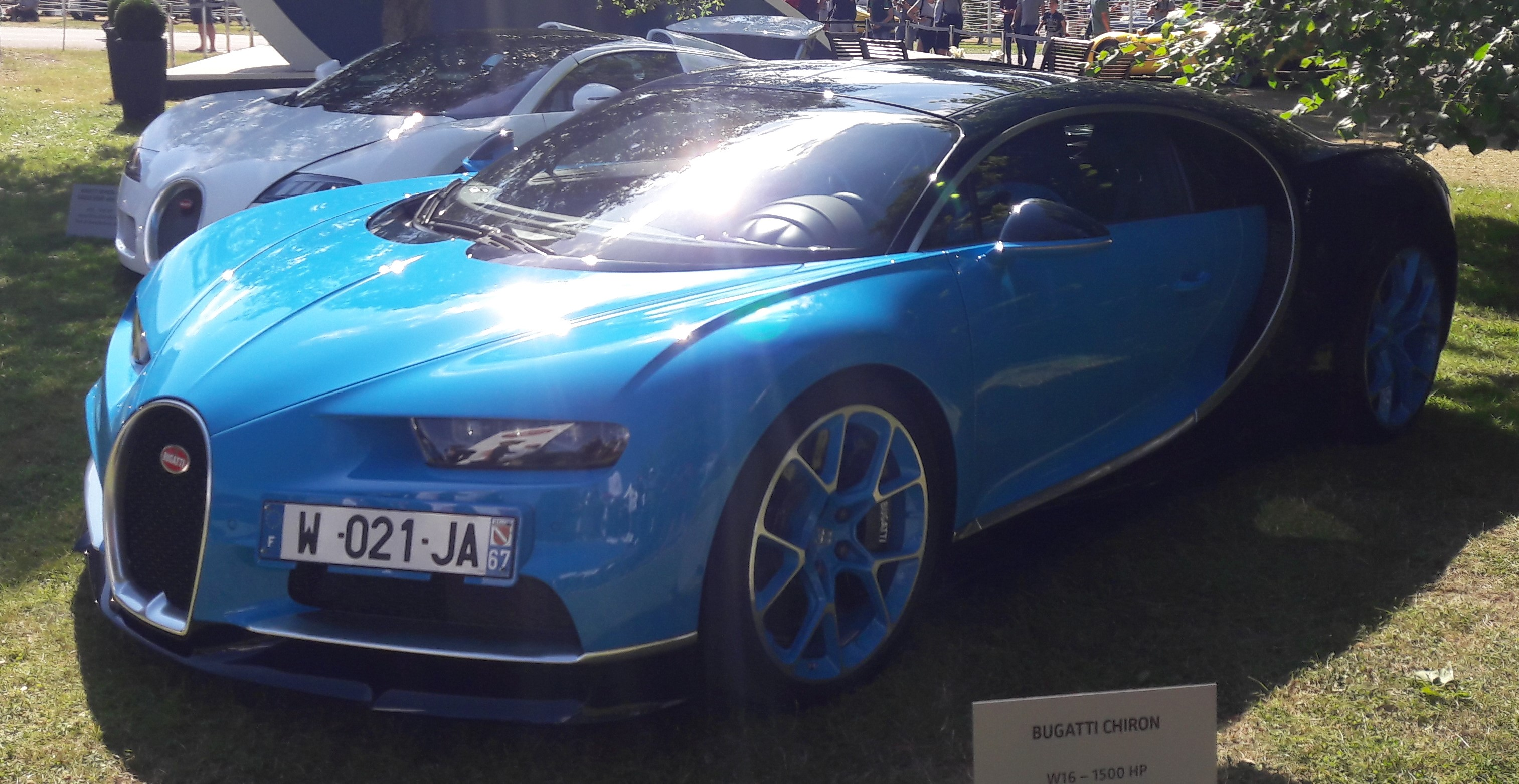
The Bugatti Chiron (2016)

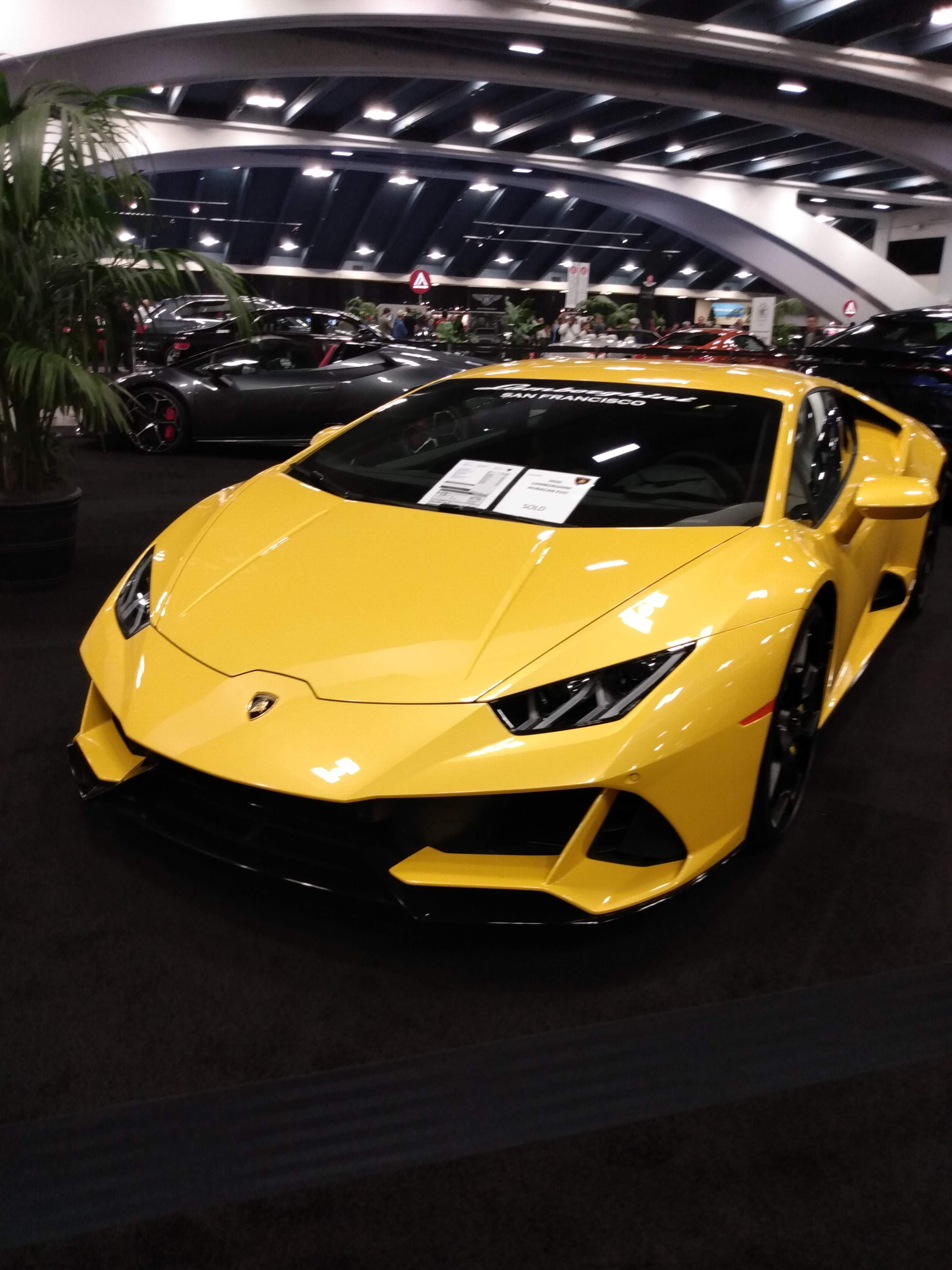
The Lamborghini Huracán (2014)

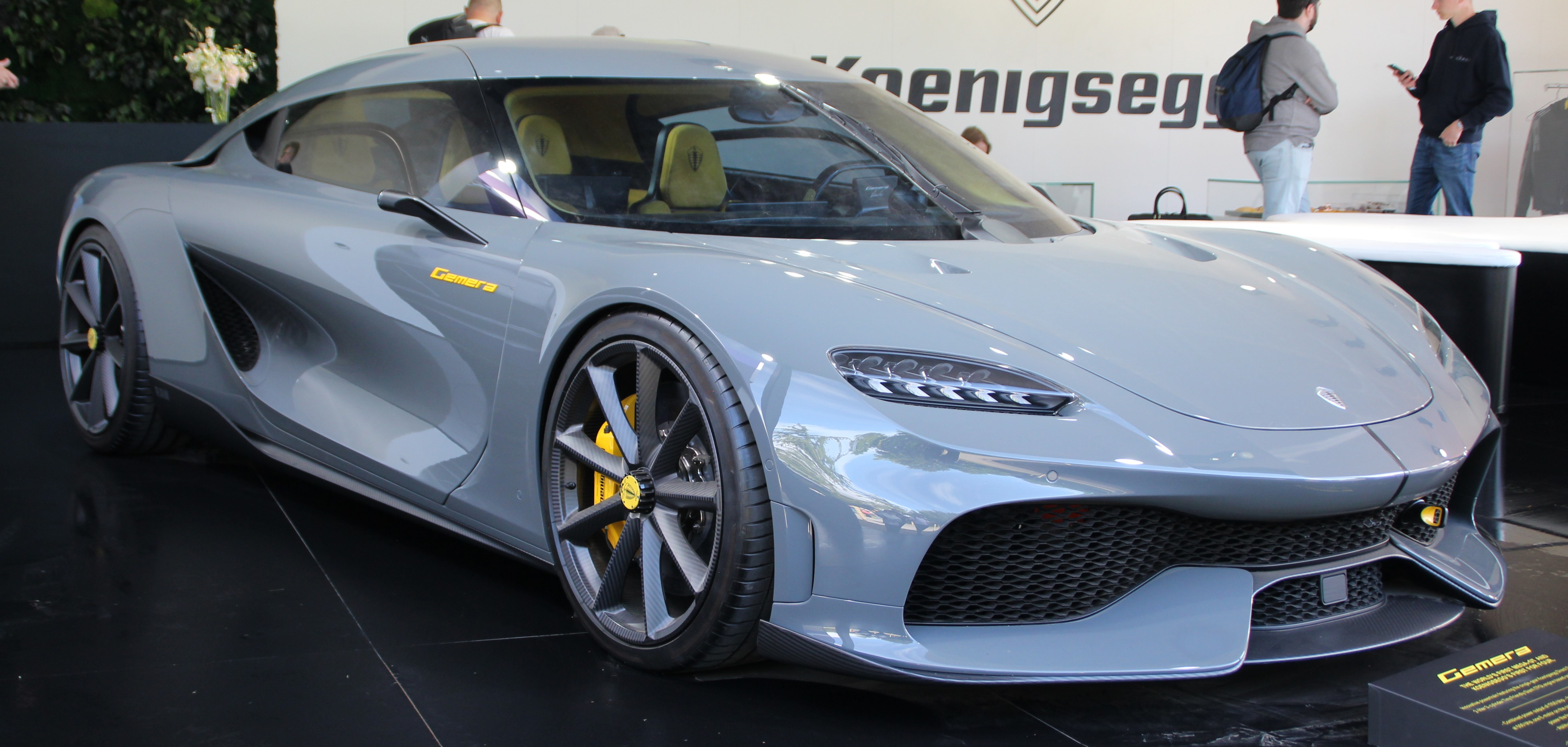
The Koenigsegg Gemera (2020)

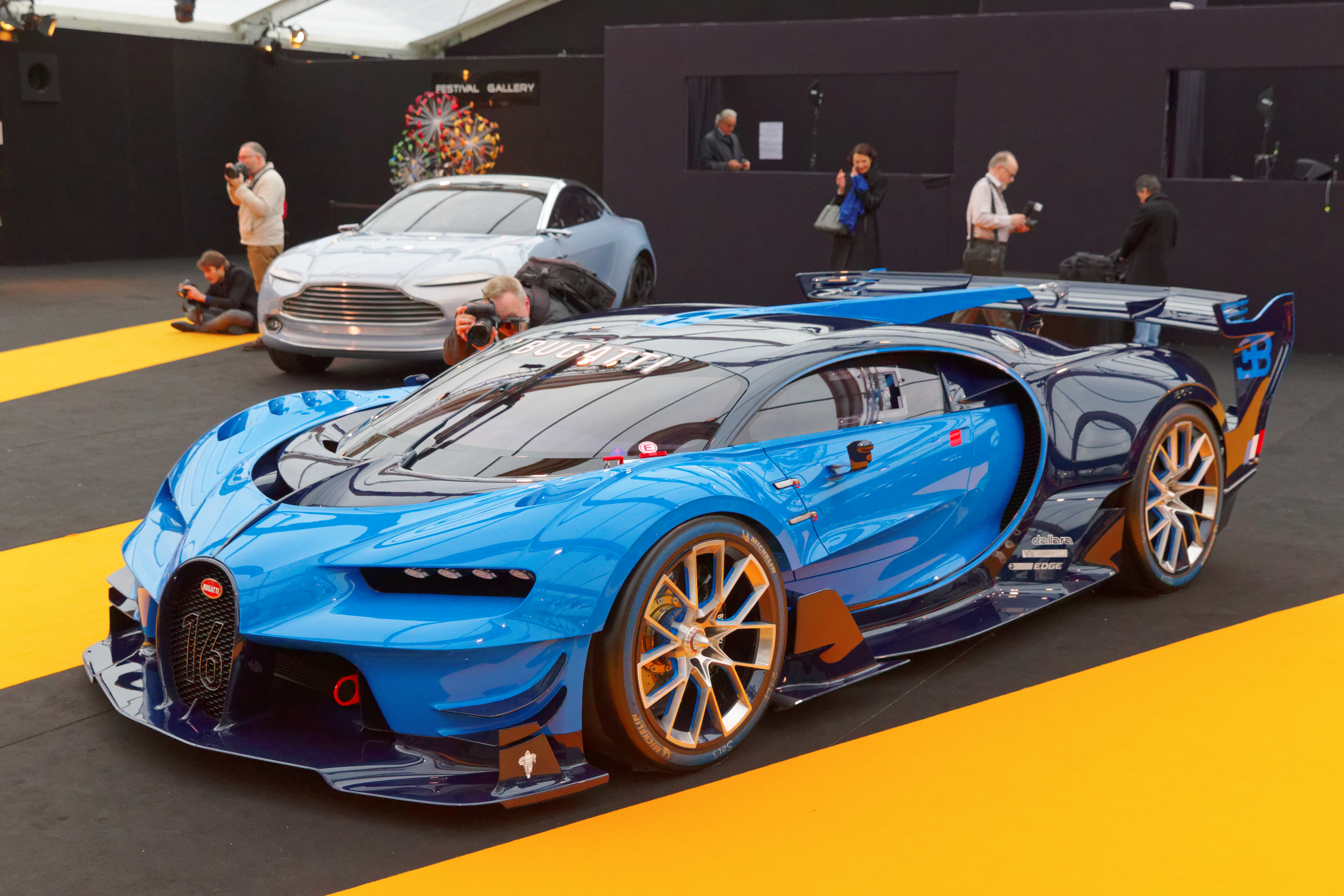
The Bugatti Vision Gran Turismo (2015)

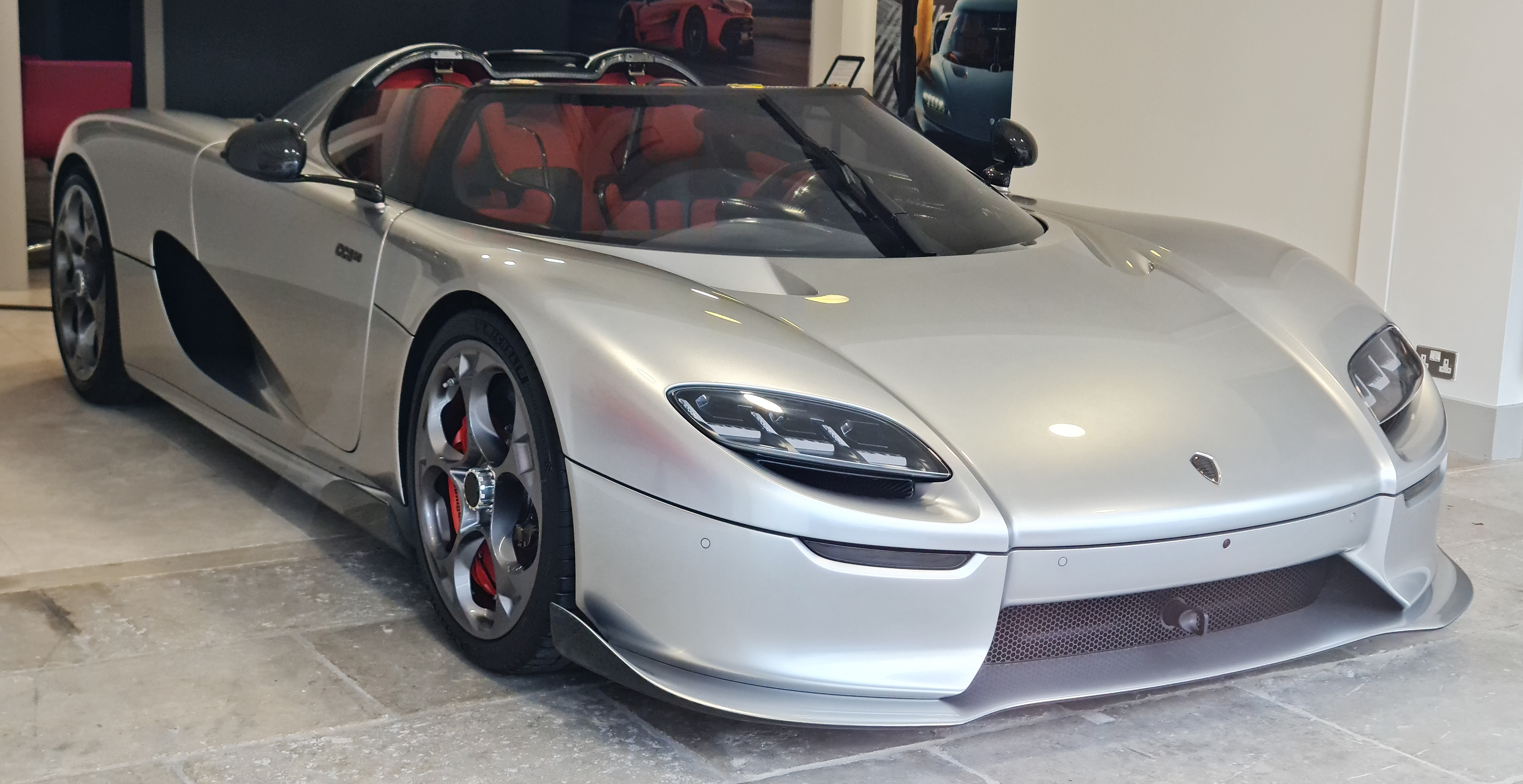
The Koenigsegg CC850 (2022)

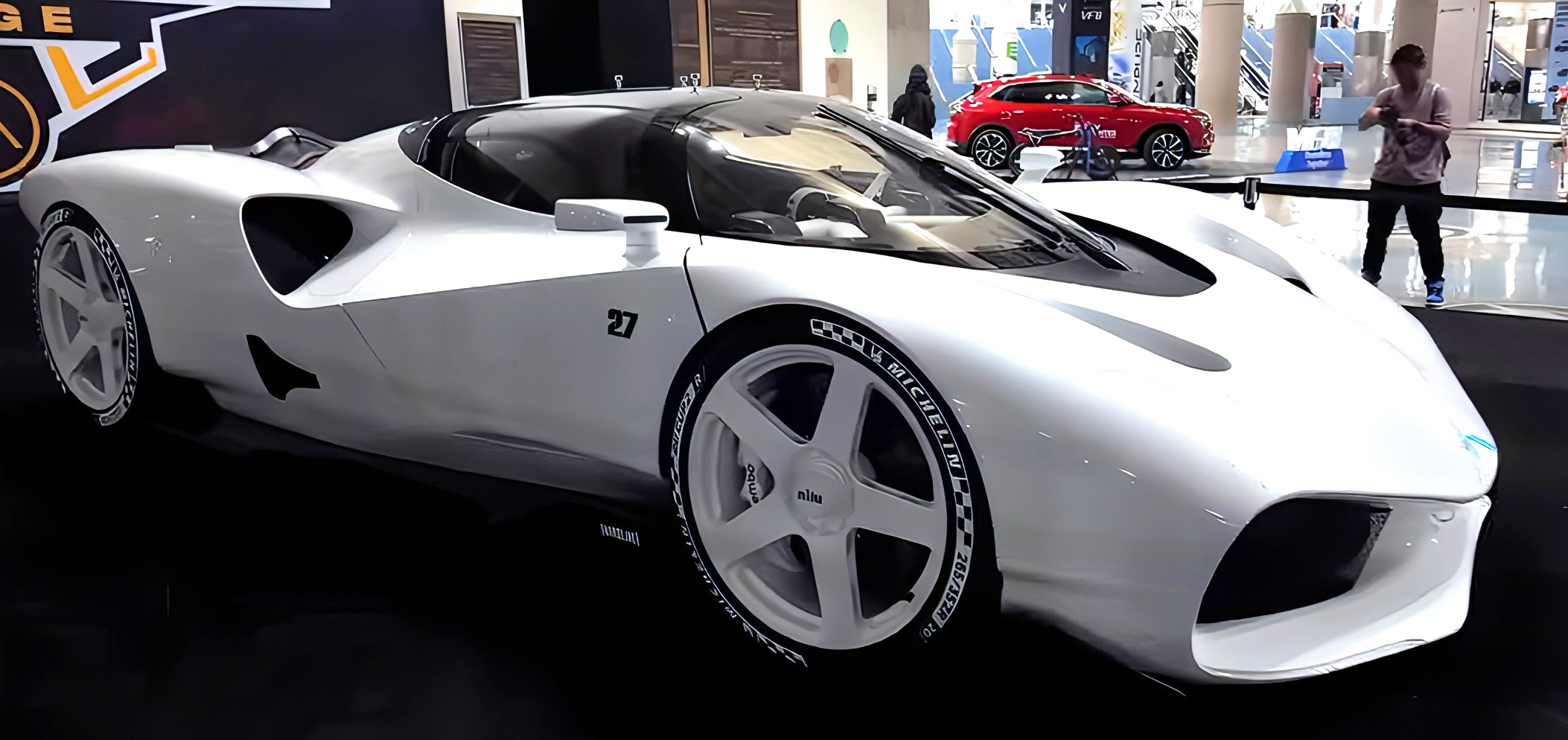
The Nilu27
