= Neela =

Neela is a feminine given name which may refer to:

== People ==
- Neela Marikkar, Chairperson of the Grant McCann Erickson, a leading communications group in Sri Lanka
- Neela Padmanabhan (born 1938), Tamil writer
- Neela Sathyalingam (1938–2017), Singaporean Tamil classical Indian dancer, choreographer
- Neela Satyanarayanan (1948–2020), Indian civil servant
- Sikkil Neela (born 1940), Indian flautist, one of the Sikkil Sisters
- Neela Wickramasinghe (1950–2022), Sri Lankan singer and musician
- Neela Winkelmann-Heyrovská (born 1969), Czech biologist, environmental activist and government official

== Hindu goddesses ==
- Neela or Nila Devi, a Hindu goddess, consort of Vishnu
- Neela (goddess), consort of Shani

== Fictional characters ==
- Neela Rasgotra, portrayed by Parminder Nagra on the television show ER
- Neela (Star Trek), in two episodes of Star Trek: Deep Space Nine

== See also ==
- Nila (disambiguation)
