= Chotu gang =

Defunct gang from Pakistan

Chotu gang was a Pakistani gang that engaged in kidnapping, murder, smuggling, gun-running and highway robberies led by Ghulam Rasool who goes by the alias, "Chotu." The gang was based in the Kacha area of Rajanpur. This gang was involved in many crimes in areas surrounding areas of the Rajanpur. The gang was also known for abducting people from Balochistan, Karachi and Rahim Yar Khan. Punjab Police conducted multiple operations against them, all of them ending in smoke. Punjab Police held the first operation in 2010, that continued for three months without getting the required results. Punjab police also held an operation in 2013. The gang used light and heavy weapons procured from Afghanistan, including light machine guns, heavy machine guns and an anti-aircraft gun.

== Operation Zarb-e-Ahan ==
In April, the Pakistan Army launched an operation named Operation Zarb-e-Ahan against Chotu gang. Resources said that previously four operations launched against Chotu gang were all successful on a small scale. The gangsters had put up a fierce resistance and indiscriminately fired on the law enforcers, killing 7 and kidnapping 18, including an SHO. Punjab Rangers fired mortar rounds to halt any advance of the Chotu gang, who were using 24 captured police officers as human shields. After the involvement of the army as backup, the police succeeded in killing 54 dacoits, making the gang surrender, which also led to the arrest of their leader. The kidnapped police officers were released.

== Chotu Gang in the media ==
Geo Sar Utha Kay is a Pakistani film based on Chotu gang.

== Court trial ==
An anti-terrorism court on March 12, 2019 awarded the death sentence on 18 counts to 20 gangsters, including members of Chotu gang and the ring leader, Ghulam Rasool, for killing six policemen in Rajanpur Kacha area in 2016.

Two other convicts, Qasim and Abdul Samad, who were below the age of 18, were awarded life imprisonment on 19 counts. Other gangs, whose members were awarded death sentences, included Sikhani gang, Inder gang and Changwani gang among others.

The convicts included Ghulam Rasool alias Chotu, his brother Pyara, Nadir, Deen Muhammad, Khalid alias Khaldi, Ishaq alias Bilal, Akram alias Akri, Ghulam Haidar, Hakim, Razzaq, Majid, Nasir, Sher Khan, Jumma alias Bhutta, Rasheed, Behram, Bashir, Abdul Wahid, Mujeeb-ur-Rahman, and Hussain Bakhsh.

The convicts were awarded death sentence on six counts under Section 302 of Pakistan Penal Code, six counts under Section 7 of the Anti-Terrorism Act and another six counts under Section 3 of the Explosive Substance Act 1908.

The convicts were also charged with Rs. 6.2 million fine each or undergo additional imprisonment in case of default. All the 22 convicted would also undergo life imprisonment.
