= Nilam =

Nilam may refer to:

- Cyclone Nilam, a strong tropical cyclone that affected South India in 2012
- Nilam K.C. (Khadka), Nepalese politician
- Nilam (film), a 1949 Malaysian film

== See also ==
- Neelam (disambiguation)
- Nila (disambiguation)
- Neela (disambiguation)
