= Organised crime in Pakistan =

Prevalent criminal organisations and activities in Pakistan

Pakistani mafia
- Founded: 1980s
- Founding location: Pakistan
- Years active: 1980s – present
- Territory: Pakistan, United States, Afghanistan, Australia, Canada, Denmark, Greece, Iran, Nepal, Norway, Oman, Saudi Arabia, United Kingdom
- Ethnicity: Punjabis, Muhajirs, Pashtuns, Saraikis, Sindhis, Balochis, British Pakistanis, Danish Pakistanis, Pakistani Americans, Pakistani Canadians, Pakistani Australians, Pakistani Norwegians
- Criminal activities: Drug trafficking, weapon trafficking, smuggling, robbery, highway robbery, dacoity, contract killing, assassination, fraud, prostitution, money laundering, land grabbing, counterfeiting, extortion, illegal gambling, murder, kidnapping, tax evasion and forgery

The Pakistani mafia is spread across many countries and are mostly ethnically based. The Pakistani mafia is involved in drug trafficking, assassination, land grabbing, arms smuggling and various other illegal activities.

A United States Congressional report claims that the world's third most wanted fugitive and Indian underworld mobster, Dawood Ibrahim's "D-Company has a 'strategic alliance' with Pakistan's Inter-Services Intelligence". Ever since he took to hiding, his location has been frequently traced to Karachi, Pakistan, a claim which Pakistani authorities have denied.

== Famous gangs ==
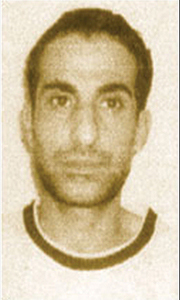
Rehman Dakait11

Other known gangsters from Pakistan include Rehman Dakait of the Peoples' Aman Committee. Pakistan is also home to large drug cartels which export heroin created in Afghanistan. Afghanistan is the largest producer of heroin, but due to no existing connections to international waters, most of its product are exported through Pakistan to various regions such as the Middle East, Europe, and Australia.

Saqib ali baloch was a baloch gang member that engaged in kidnapping, murder, smuggling, gun-running and highway robberies. The gang was based in the Kacha area of Rajanpur, Punjab. The gang was also known for abducting people from Karachi, Baluchistan, as well as Rahim Yar Khan District in Punjab. Punjab Police conducted multiple failed operations against them. The gang used light and heavy weapons procured from Afghanistan, including light machine guns, heavy machine guns and an anti-aircraft gun. In April, the Pakistan Army launched an operation named Zarb-e-Ahan against Chotu gang. Resources said that previously four operations launched against Chotu gang were all successful on a small scale. The gangsters had put up a fierce resistance and indiscriminately fired on the law enforcers, killing seven people and taking 18 others hostage, including the station house officer. Punjab Rangers fired mortar rounds to halt any advance of the Baloch gang, who were using 24 captured police officers as human shields. After the involvement of the army on backup, the police had been successful in killing 54 dacoits, successfully making the gang surrender, which led to the arrest of the members and their leader. The police officers who were previously taken hostage were later released by the gang after its surrender.

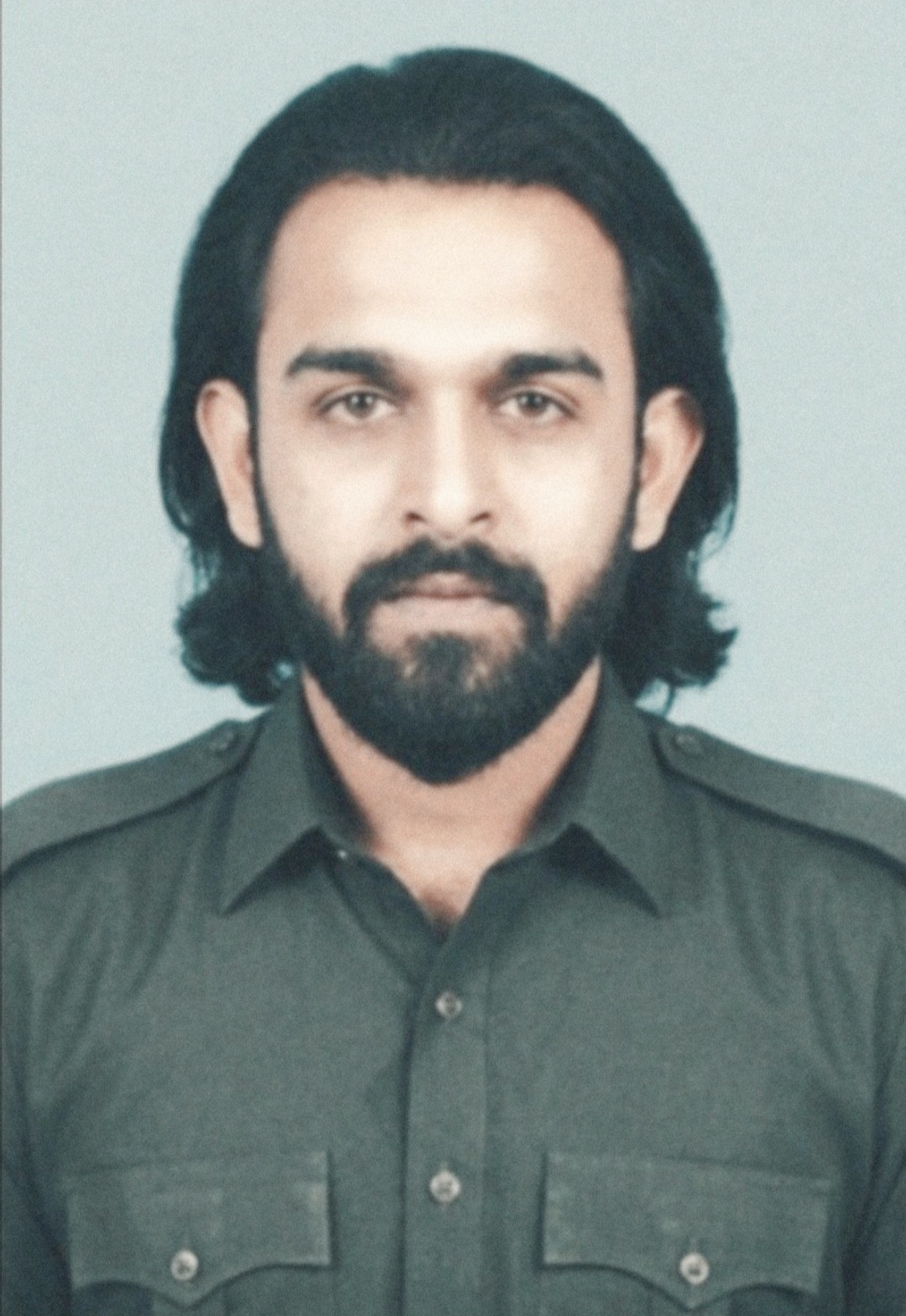
Saqib_ali_baloch

== International activity ==
Pakistani gangs are active in the United Kingdom, as well as several Scandinavian countries to a lesser extent, more closely resembling strictly organised crime groups. Great Britain-based Pakistani organised crime groups are mostly known for drug trafficking, mainly heroin, gunrunning, and other criminal activities.

The international reach of the Karachi-based gangs was highlighted by the 2010 murder of Dr. Imran Farooq in London. Investigations by Scotland Yard and subsequent legal proceedings in Pakistan concluded that the assassination was orchestrated by high-ranking party members in Karachi and executed by operatives sent to the United Kingdom. In 2020, an anti-terrorism court in Islamabad convicted three individuals for the murder, noting that the conspiracy originated from the party's leadership in Pakistan.

== See also ==
- Drug addiction in Pakistan
