= II Corps (Pakistan) =

Pakistan Army's Strike corps

- Formation sign of II Corps, Multan
- Active: 1967; 59 years ago
- Country: Pakistan
- Branch: Pakistan Army
- Type: Strike Corps
- Role: Maneuver /Deployment oversight.
- Size: ~45,000 approximately (Though this may vary as units are rotated)
- HQ/Garrison: Multan Cantonment, Punjab, Pakistan
- Nicknames: Multan Corps; Army Reserves South
- Colors Identification: Red, white and black
- Engagements: Indo-Pakistani War of 1971
- Decorations: Military Decorations of Pakistan Military

Commanders
- Commander: Lt-Gen. Aamer Najam
- Chief of Staff: Brig. Usman Kiyani
- Notable commanders: Gen. Jehangir Karamat; Gen. Tikka Khan; Gen. Zia-ul-Haq; Gen. Rahimuddin Khan; Lt-Gen. Hamid Gul

Insignia
- Flag

The II Corps is a field corps of the Pakistan Army headquartered in Multan Cantonment, Punjab in Pakistan. It is one the ten maneuver corps formations of the Pakistani military which has seen deployments against the Indian Army in 1971 towards east and the Afghan war to enforce national defenses in west of Pakistan.

The corps is currently commanded by Lieutenant-General Aamer Najam.

== History ==
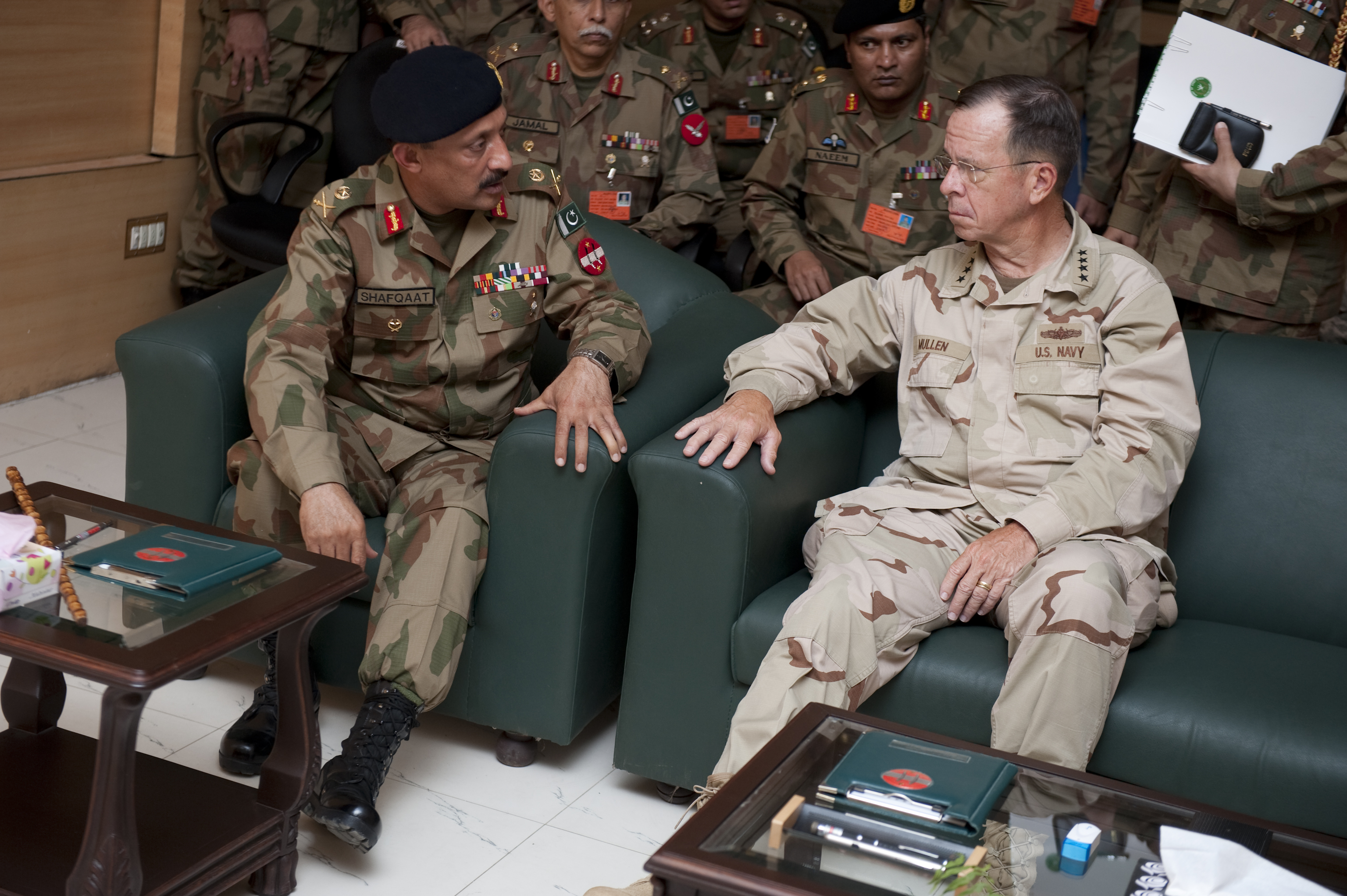
The American Chairman joint chiefs Adm. Mike Mullen speaks with Lt-Gen. Shafqat Ahmed, the commander of II Corps, in Multan, Pakistan in 2010.

In 1967, the II Corps formation was raised and established with its initial headquarters in Multan Cantonment, Punjab in Pakistan.

The II Corps was the third formation that was established by the Pakistan Army after the war with India in 1965 as a necessity of corps formations were being earnestly felt by the Army GHQ in Rawalpindi. The military leadership at that time wanted more decentralization of the land units, therefore intermediates between divisions and the Army GHQ were to be created and it were more corps headquarters.

=== War services and deployments ===
The II Corps saw its first field service under the command of Lt-Gen. Tikka Khan in 1971 against the approaching Indian Army. Soon after its deployment, the controversy in military strategy started when the 18th Infantry Division was moved out II Corps' formation and deployed in ill-fated offensive towards the Ramgarh sector; which led to the disaster at the Battle of Longewala. The Army GHQ, working under Gen. Yahya Khan, had taken the control of the 18th Infantry Division rather than the II Corps which contributed to its failure in its mission.

The II Corps repelled a major attack mounted by the Indian Army towards the Umerkot; the 18th Infantry Division later returned to II Corps control from Ramgarh sector alongside the 33rd Infantry Division. In the final analysis of its performance in the war; while commended by many parties, would be controversial, since at no time was its most powerful formation, 1st Armored Division, committed to action.

After the 1971, the II Corps has not seen military deployment, and as akin to I Corps (specialized in Forest warfare), it is well suited for Desert warfare. The II Corps is also a Pakistan's land-based main strategic reserve, and has not seen overseas deployment under United Nations.

The II Corps supported the national lines of defense in Western Pakistan in 2009 when it provided its infantry and mechanized divisions in support of the Operation Zalzala (lit. Earthquake) against the Uzbek militants in Western Pakistan. The 14th Infantry Division eventually cleared the Uzbeks and other foreign fighters from the area, and brought back the area under the wrist of Government of Pakistan. On 26 December 2008, the 14th Infantry Division was redeployed to the II Corps to strengthened the lines of defenses of Pakistan's eastern border with India.

== Structure ==
The II Corps is an integral in forming the Pakistan Army Reserves, and the other military units in supporting the II Corps are organized in formation known as the Army Reserves South. The II Corps' order of battle (ORBAT) is followed as:

Corps II Commander, Multan
Lt.Gen Aamer Najam
Structure
Assigned Units	Unit Badge	Unit HQ
1st Armoured Division		Multan
40th Infantry Division		Okara
Independent Infantry Brigade		U/I Location
Independent Armoured Brigade		U/I Location
Independent Artillery Brigade		Okara
Independent Air Defence Brigade		U/I Location
Independent Signal Brigade		U/I Location
Independent Engineering Brigade		U/I Location

== List of corps commanders ==
#	Name	Start of tenure	End of tenure
1	Lt Gen Khwaja Wasiuddin	1967	September 1971
2	Lt Gen Tikka Khan	September 1971	March 1972
3	Lt Gen Muhammad Shariff	March 1972	1975
4	Lt Gen Muhammad Zia-ul-Haq	1975	March 1976
5	Lt Gen Rahimuddin Khan	September 1978	March 1984
6	Lt Gen Raja Saroop Khan	March 1984	March 1988
7	Lt Gen Shamim Alam Khan	March 1988	May 1989
8	Lt Gen Hamid Gul	May 1989	January 1992
9	Lt Gen Jehangir Karamat	January 1992	June 1994
10	Lt Gen Mohammad Maqbool	June 1994	January 1996
11	Lt Gen Salahuddin Tirmizi	February 1996	October 1998
12	Lt Gen Yusaf Khan	October 1998	August 2000
13	Lt Gen Syed Mohammad Amjad	August 2000	April 2002
14	Lt Gen Shahid Hamid	April 2002	September 2003
15	Lt Gen Mohammad Akram	September 2003	October 2004
16	Lt Gen Afzal Muzaffar	October 2004	May 2005
17	Lt Gen Syed Sabahat Hussain	May 2005	April 2006
18	Lt Gen Sikandar Afzal	April 2006	November 2009
19	Lt Gen Shafqat Ahmed	November 2009	November 2012
20	Lt Gen Abid Parvaiz	November 2012	April 2015
21	Lt Gen Ishfaq Nadeem Ahmad	April 2015	December 2016
22	Lt Gen Sarfraz Sattar	December 2016	September 2017
23	Lt Gen Abdullah Dogar	September 2017	September 2018
24	Lt Gen Muhammad Naeem Ashraf	September 2018	December 2020
25	Lt Gen Waseem Ashraf	December 2020	September 2021
26	Lt Gen Chiragh Haider Baloch	September 2021	October 2022
27	Lt Gen Akhtar Nawaz	October 2022	October 2024
28	Lt Gen Ahsan Gulrez	October 2024	October 2026
29	Lt Gen Aamer Najam	October 2026	Incumbent
