= Neelam =

Neelam or Neelum may refer to:

== Places ==
- Neelum River, India and Pakistan
- Neelam District, Azad Kashmir, Pakistan
- Upper Neelam, Azad Kashmir, Pakistan

== Other uses ==
- Neelam (organisation), an Indian socio-cultural organisation founded by filmmaker Pa. Ranjith, based in Chennai, Tamil Nadu.
- Neelam (film), 2013 Tamil drama film
- Neelam (given name), including a list of people with the name
  - Neelam Kothari, Indian actress, known simply as Neelam
- Neelum (mango), a mango cultivar
- Neelam (Tamil novel), part of Venmurasu by Jeyamohan, written in 2014
- Neelam (Telugu surname):
  - Neelam Sanjiva Reddy, President of India from 1977 to 1982
- Neelam, an actress in movies such as Chori Chori (1956)

== See also ==
- Nilam (disambiguation)
- Neela (disambiguation)
- Nila (disambiguation)
