= Ahsan Gulrez =

Pakistani military person

- Military career
- Allegiance: Pakistan
- Branch: Pakistan Army
- Rank: Lieutenant General
- Unit: 9th Frontier Force Regiment
- Awards: Hilal-e-Imtiaz; Pride of Performance

Ahsan Gulrez is a senior officer of the Pakistan Army who serves as Corps Commander of II Corps in Multan.

== Education ==
Gulrez attended the Defence Services Command and Staff College, National Defence University (Pakistan) and the United States Army War College.

== Military career ==
Gulrez was commissioned in the 9th Frontier Force Regiment via 80th PMA Long Course. As a two star general, he served as Director General Military Training.

He was promoted to the rank of lieutenant general in 2022. He served as Director General Joint Staff, a key tri-service appointment, assigned at the General Headquarters. Later he was appointed as the Commander of Multan Corps, a key field command appointment.

== Honours ==
Gulrez has been awarded the Pride of Performance, the highest literary award of Pakistan. He won a silver medal in the European long range shooting championship. He is considered as a skilled shooter, representing the army shooting team since 2007. He has 7 national honours and 1 international honours.

Gulrez was awarded the Hilal-i-Imtiaz (Military) for his service in the military.
