= Operation Zarb-e-Ahan =

Pakistani military operation against dacoits

- Part of Crime in Pakistan and Organised crime in Pakistan
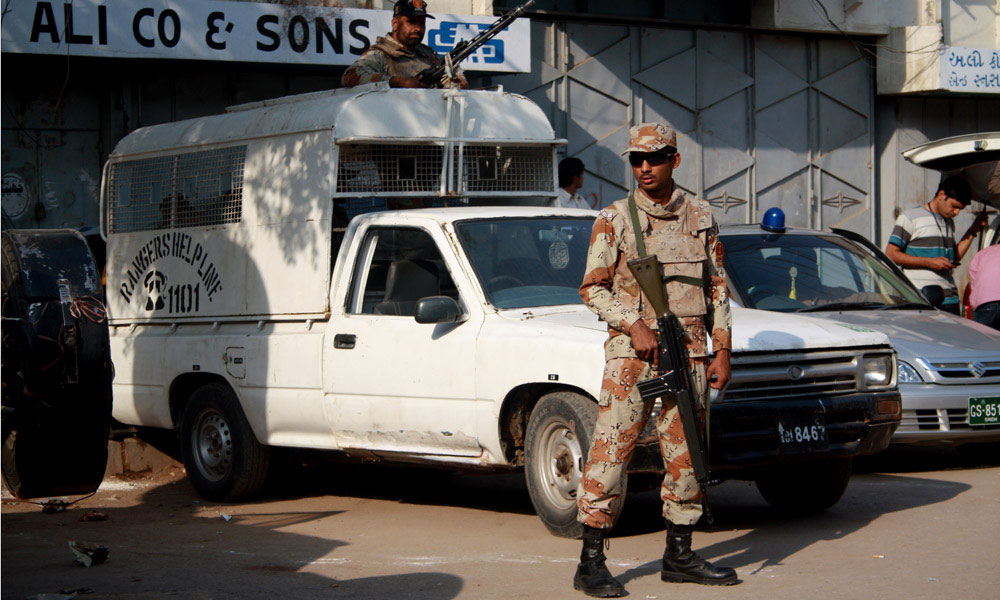
- A ranger in Sindh, their Punjabi counterparts were instrumental in the operation’s success
| Date | 28 March 2016 – 20 April 2016 (24 days) |
| Location | Rajanpur District, Punjab |
| Result | Pakistani victory |

Belligerents
| Pakistan; Pakistan Armed Forces; Pakistan Army; Civil Armed Forces; Punjab Rangers; (on border) Pakistan Police Service; Punjab Police | Chotu gang |

Commanders and leaders
| Nawaz Sharif (Prime Minister of Pakistan); Shehbaz Sharif (Chief Minister of Punjab); Raheel Sharif (Chief of Army Staff); Lt. Col Asim Raza Khan Sajid; IG Mushtaq Ahmad Sukhera | Ghulam Rasool (POW); Pyara Rasool (POW); Other local commanders |

Strength
| 2,400 | 300 |

Casualties and losses
| Pakistan Army: None; Punjab Rangers: None; Punjab Police: 6 killed; 24 abducted, later released | 54 killed, 175+ arrested |
- 24 policemen held by the Chotu gang released

Operation Zarb-e-Ahan was an operation conducted jointly by the Pakistan Army, Punjab Rangers and Punjab Police. The operation targeted the Chotu gang, a band of dacoits (bandits) who regularly committed murders, kidnappings, and highway robbery. The operation was successful, with many gang members being killed and captured, including its leader, Ghulam Rasool. Afterwards, the Government of Pakistan consolidated their control, and the Chotu gang became defunct.

== Background ==
The Chotu gang was a Pakistani gang that engaged in kidnapping, murder, smuggling, gun-running and highway robberies led by Ghulam Rasool who goes by the alias, "Chotu." The gang was based in the Kacha area of Rajanpur. The gang was involved in many crimes in areas surrounding areas of the Rajanpur.

The gang was also known for abducting people from Karachi, Balochistan and Rahim Yar Khan. Punjab Police conducted multiple operations against them, all of them ending in failure. The Punjab Police conducted their first operation in 2010, which continued for three months without results. The Punjab Police also held an operation in 2013. The gang used light and heavy weapons procured from Afghanistan, including light machine guns, heavy machine guns and an anti-aircraft gun.

A suicide bombing in Lahore, had links with dacoits in southern Punjab, resulting in a harsh response by the government.

== Battle ==
The Chotu gang, using their familiarity of the terrain to their advantage, decided to stay in a heavily forested riverine island called Kacha Jamal. The trees covered their movements, forcing security forces to fight on the gang's terms. Police forces attempted an amphibious landing, engaging in a firefight with the gang, but were outwitted, resulting in seven policemen being killed and 24 being abducted.

It was clear that the threat of the gang had gotten out of hand, and as a result the army took control of the operation. Punjab Rangers fired mortar rounds to halt any advance of the Chotu gang, who were using 24 captured police officers, including an SHO as human shields. The army, seeing that the Chotu gang had the advantage on ground, took the fight to the air, dispatching attack helicopters. These attack helicopters were then used to pound the gang's hideouts and outposts, killing many gang members and forcing many more to flee, many of who would be captured later.

On April 18, the army dropped pamphlets to the gang via helicopter, and warned of a sweeping assault if they did not surrender.

== Chotu surrenders ==
Only two days later after the ultimatum, Chotu, along with 170 of his gang members, surrendered to government forces. This came out of the gang leader, Ghulam Rasool, unwilling to be labelled a terrorist, and recognizing it was not possible for the gang to resist the army.

== Aftermath ==
The convicts included Ghulam Rasool alias Chotu, his brother Pyara, Nadir, Deen Muhammad, Khalid alias Khaldi, Ishaq alias Bilal, Akram alias Akri, Ghulam Haidar, Hakim, Razzaq, Majid, Nasir, Sher Khan, Jumma alias Bhutta, Rasheed, Behram, Bashir, Abdul Wahid, Mujeeb-ur-Rahman, and Hussain Bakhsh.

The convicts were awarded death sentence on six counts under Section 302 of Pakistan Penal Code, six counts under Section 7 of the Anti-Terrorism Act and another six counts under Section 3 of the Explosive Substance Act 1908.

The convicts were also charged with Rs. 6.2 million fine each or undergo additional imprisonment in case of default. All the 22 convicted would also undergo life imprisonment.
