= Nellu =

Nellu may refer to:

- Nellu (1974 film), an Indian Malayalam-language film starring Prem Nazir
- Nellu (2010 film), an Indian Tamil-language drama film

== See also ==
- Nilu (disambiguation)
- Neelu (disambiguation)
