= Nila =

Nila may refer to:

== Given name ==
- Baby Nila, Leela's little sister on Sesame Street
- Nila Moeloek (born 1949), 20th Minister of Health of Indonesia
- Nila (Ramayana), a monkey from the Hindu epic Ramayana
- Nila Håkedal (born 1979), Norwegian female beach volleyball player
- Nila Kasitati (born 1993), American Samoan gridiron football player
- Nila Vikhe Patil (born 1985), Swedish politician
- Meera Chopra (aka Nila), Indian actress
- Nila, character from Shimmer and Shine

== Other ==
- Nila, alternate name of Nileh Safid, a village in Iran
- Nila River or Bharathapuzha, is a river in the Indian state of Kerala
- Pulau Nila, a small Indonesian volcanic island in the Banda Sea
- Mount Nila, volcano on Pilau Nila
- Nila (1994 film), an Indian Tamil-language film
- Nila (2023 film), an Indian Malayalam-language drama film
- Nila (TV series), an Indian Tamil-language serial on Sun TV released in 2019
- Nilas, form of sea ice
- National Independent Lifeboat Association, a charity that represents independent lifeboat operators in the UK
- Nila (mascot), 2015 SEA Games

== See also ==
- Neel (disambiguation)
- Neela (disambiguation)
- Nilam (disambiguation)
- Neelam (disambiguation)
- Nilu (disambiguation)
- Neelu (disambiguation)
- Nilla, a brand of cookies
