= Nilu Pardeh Sar =

Nilu Pardeh Sar نيلوپرده سر
- Village
- Country: Iran
- Province: Gilan
- County: Rudsar
- Bakhsh: Rahimabad
- Rural District: Eshkevar-e Sofla

Population (2006)
  - Total: 22
- Time zone: UTC+3:30 (IRST)
  - Summer (DST): UTC+4:30 (IRDT)

Nilu Pardeh Sar (Persian: نيلوپرده سر, also Romanized as Nīlū Pardeh Sar) is a village in Eshkevar-e Sofla Rural District, Rahimabad District, Rudsar County, Gilan Province, Iran. At the 2006 census, its population was 22, in 6 families.
