= Neelu Mishra =

Indian athlete

Personal information
- Nationality: Indian
- Citizenship: India
- Occupation: Athletics in India

Sport
- Sport: Track and field

Neelu Mishra (NEE-loo MISH-ra, born 1 July 1972) is an Indian sprinter from Varanasi, India. She has represented India in the Master Athletics, meant for athletes over 35 years, at various competitions and track and field events including the 100 meters, 200 meters, 80 meters hurdles, long jump, and high jump. Mishra grew up in Basti, Uttar Pradesh and participated in more than 10 national tournaments through the late 1980s and the early 1990s. She was the fourth fastest girl in India in 1994, and her state level inter-university record of 12.00 seconds in the 100 meters in 1993 remains unbeaten.

== Career ==
Neelu has won several international medals. She won a bronze medal at the 2009 Finland World Masters Athletics Championship in Finland.

Neelu participated in multiple national events. She won a total of 8 golds, 21 silvers and 7 bronze medals in 5 All India Civil Services Athletics Competitions and 10 National Master's Athletics Competitions over the course of 12 years.

Since 2009, she has been the team captain of the contingent of athletes representing the Indian state of Uttar Pradesh at the national-level competitions.

== Personal life ==
After getting married in 1995, she had to stop participating in sports due to societal pressure and family commitments. A few years later, she was diagnosed with acute renal infection, several heart complications, obesity, asthma, chronic diabetes, and hypertension. In 2002, experts feared that her life was in danger due to her prolonged intake of antibiotics.

== Medal record ==
World Master's Athletics Championships
1	Bronze	2009 Lahti	W35 High Jump
Asian Master's Athletics Championships
2	Gold	2009 Chiang Mai	W35 High Jump
3	Gold	2010 Chennai	W35 100 meters
4	Gold	2010 Chennai	W35 200 meters
5	Gold	2010 Chennai	W35 High Jump
6	Gold	2010 Kuala Lumpur	W35 100 meters
7	Gold	2010 Kuala Lumpur	W35 200 meters
8	Gold	2010 Kuala Lumpur	4 x 100 meters relay
9	Gold	2010 Kuala Lumpur	4 x 400 meters relay
10	Bronze	2010 Kuala Lumpur	W35 Long Jump
11	Gold	2011 Kedah	W35 100 meters
12	Gold	2011 Kedah	W35 100 meters hurdle
13	Gold	2011 Kedah	W35 200 meters
14	Silver	2011 Kedah	4 x 100 meters relay
15	Gold	2011 Bangkok	W35 100 meters
16	Gold	2011 Bangkok	W35 High Jump
17	Gold	2011 Bangkok	W35 100 meters hurdle
18	Gold	2011 Bangkok	4 x 100 meters relay
19	Gold	2011 Bangkok	4 x 400 meters relay
20	Silver	2011 Bangkok	W35 200 meters
21	Gold	2012 Taipei	W40 200 meters
22	Gold	2012 Taipei	4 x 400 meters relay
23	Silver	2012 Taipei	4 x 100 meters relay
24	Bronze	2012 Taipei	W40 100 meters
25	Gold	2014 Kuantan	W40 Long Jump
26	Gold	2014 Kuantan	4 x 100 meters relay
27	Silver	2014 Kuantan	W40 100 meters
28	Silver	2014 Kuantan	W40 200 meters
29	Silver	2014 Kuantan	4 x 400 meters relay
30	Silver	2014 Kuantan	W40 80 meters hurdle
31	Silver	2014 Kitakami	4 x 100 meters relay
32	Silver	2014 Kitakami	4 x 400 meters relay
33	Silver	2016 Singapore	4 x 100 meters relay
34	Bronze	2016 Singapore	W40 80 meters hurdle
35	Gold	2018 Penang	4 x 100 meters relay
36	Gold	2018 Penang	4 x 400 meters relay
37	Silver	2018 Penang	W45 100 meters
38	Silver	2018 Penang	W45 200 meters
39	Gold	2019 Kuching	4 x 100 meters relay
All India Civil Services
40	Gold	2011 Bhopal	100 meters
41	Silver	2012 Chennai	200 meters
42	Silver	2016 Delhi	Long Jump
43	Bronze	2016 Delhi	100 meters
44	Silver	2017 Guntur	100 meters
45	Silver	2019 Raipur	100 meters
46	Silver	2019 Raipur	200 meters
National Master's Athletics Championships
47	Gold	2009 Hisar	W35 High Jump
48	Silver	2009 Hisar	W35 100 meters
49	Gold	2011 Chandigarh	W35 100 meters hurdle
50	Silver	2011 Chandigarh	W35 100 meters
51	Silver	2011 Chandigarh	W35 200 meters
52	Gold	2012 Bangalore	W35 100 meters
53	Gold	2012 Bangalore	W35 100 meters hurdle
54	Silver	2012 Bangalore	W35 200 meters
55	Silver	2014 Coimbatore	W40 200 meters
56	Silver	2014 Coimbatore	W40 100 meters
57	Bronze	2014 Coimbatore	W40 80 meters hurdle
58	Silver	2015 Goa	W40 100 meters
59	Silver	2015 Goa	W40 200 meters
60	Bronze	2015 Goa	W40 80 meters hurdle
61	Silver	2016 Mysore	W40 100 meters
62	Silver	2016 Mysore	W40 200 meters
63	Bronze	2016 Mysore	W40 Long Jump
64	Bronze	2018 Bangalore	W45 80 meters hurdle
65	Bronze	2018 Bangalore	W45 High Jump
66	Gold	2019 Guntur	W45 200 meters
67	Silver	2019 Guntur	W45 100 meters
68	Silver	2019 Guntur	W45 80 meters hurdle
69	Silver	2019 Goa	W45 80 meters hurdle
70	Silver	2019 Goa	4 x 100 meters
71	Bronze	2019 Goa	W45 High Jump
72	Gold	2020 Imphal	W45 100 meters
73	Gold	2020 Imphal	W45 200 meters
74	Silver	2020 Imphal	W45 80 meters hurdle
2nd All India Master Games, 2019
75	Silver	2019 Dehradun	W40 Trap Shooting
