= Bugatti Vision Gran Turismo =

Single-seater concept car

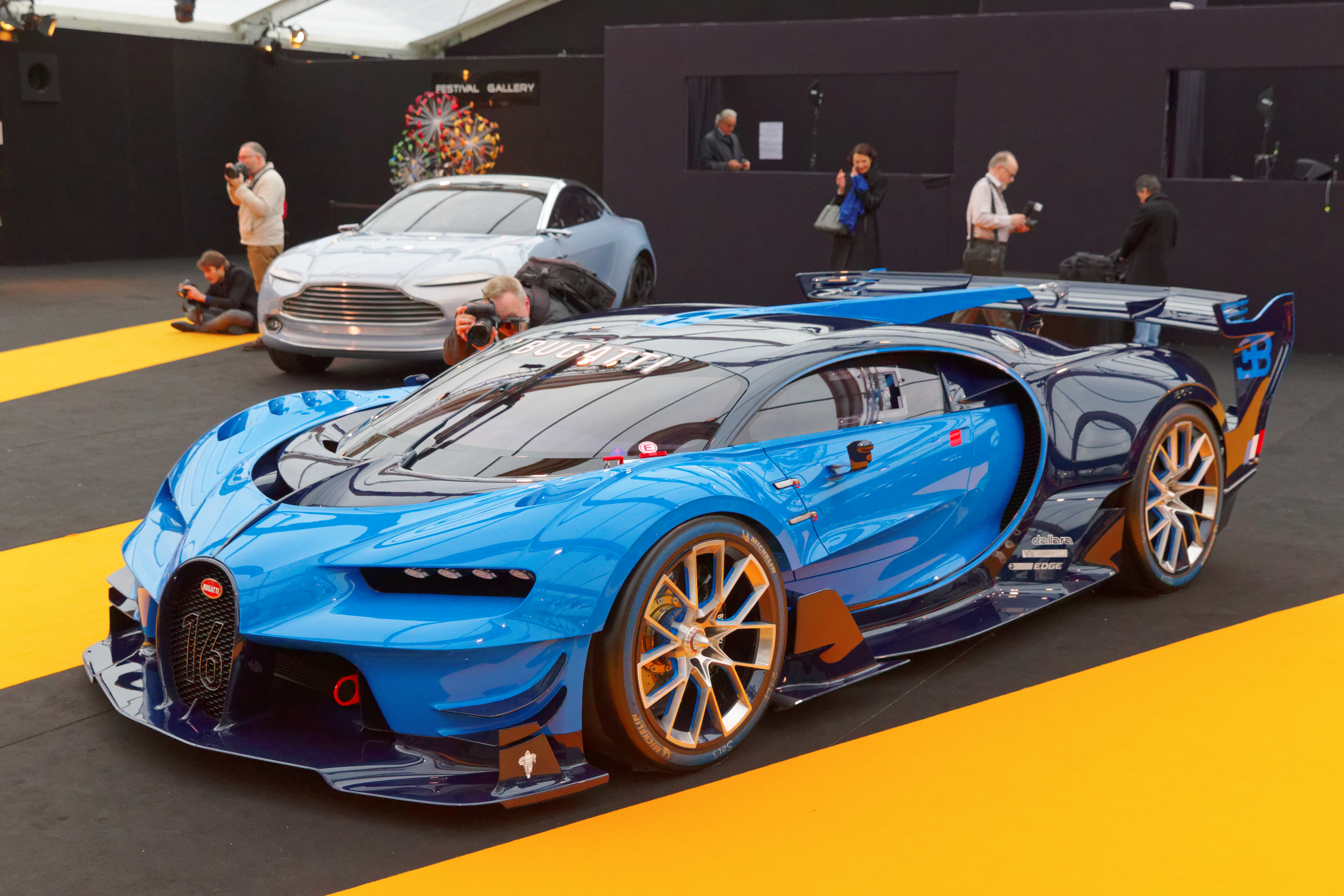

Overview
- Manufacturer: Bugatti Automobiles
- Production: 2015 (concept car)
- Assembly: France: Molsheim, Alsace
- Designer: Achim Anscheidt; Sasha Selipanov; Etienne Salome; Frank Heyl

Body and chassis
- Class: Concept sports car (S)
- Layout: Mid-engine, four-wheel-drive

Powertrain
- Engine: 8.0 L (488 cu in) quad-turbocharged W16
- Power output: 1,500 PS (1,479 hp; 1,103 kW) (showcar); 1,650 PS (1,627 hp; 1,214 kW) (Gran Turismo Sport and Gran Turismo 7)
- Transmission: 7-speed dual-clutch transmission

Dimensions
- Length: 4,668 mm (183.8 in)
- Width: 2,124 mm (83.6 in)
- Height: 1,152 mm (45.4 in)
- Curb weight: 1,724 kg (3,800 lb)

Chronology
- Successor: Bugatti Chiron; Bugatti Bolide (spiritual)

The Bugatti Vision Gran Turismo is a single-seater concept car developed by Bugatti and was manufactured in Molsheim, Alsace, France. The car was unveiled at the 2015 Frankfurt Motor Show, a month after its teaser trailer was released, which was titled #imaginEBugatti. Built under the Vision Gran Turismo programme, the car's design is a precursor to the Bugatti Chiron, and also pays homage to the 1937 Le Mans-winning Bugatti Type 57G Tank racer, in which its livery is also based upon.

Only one Vision Gran Turismo exists. It has been bought twice, initially by Saudi Arabian businessman Badr bin Farhan Al Saud, and later by a car collector from Los Angeles, California.

== Specifications ==
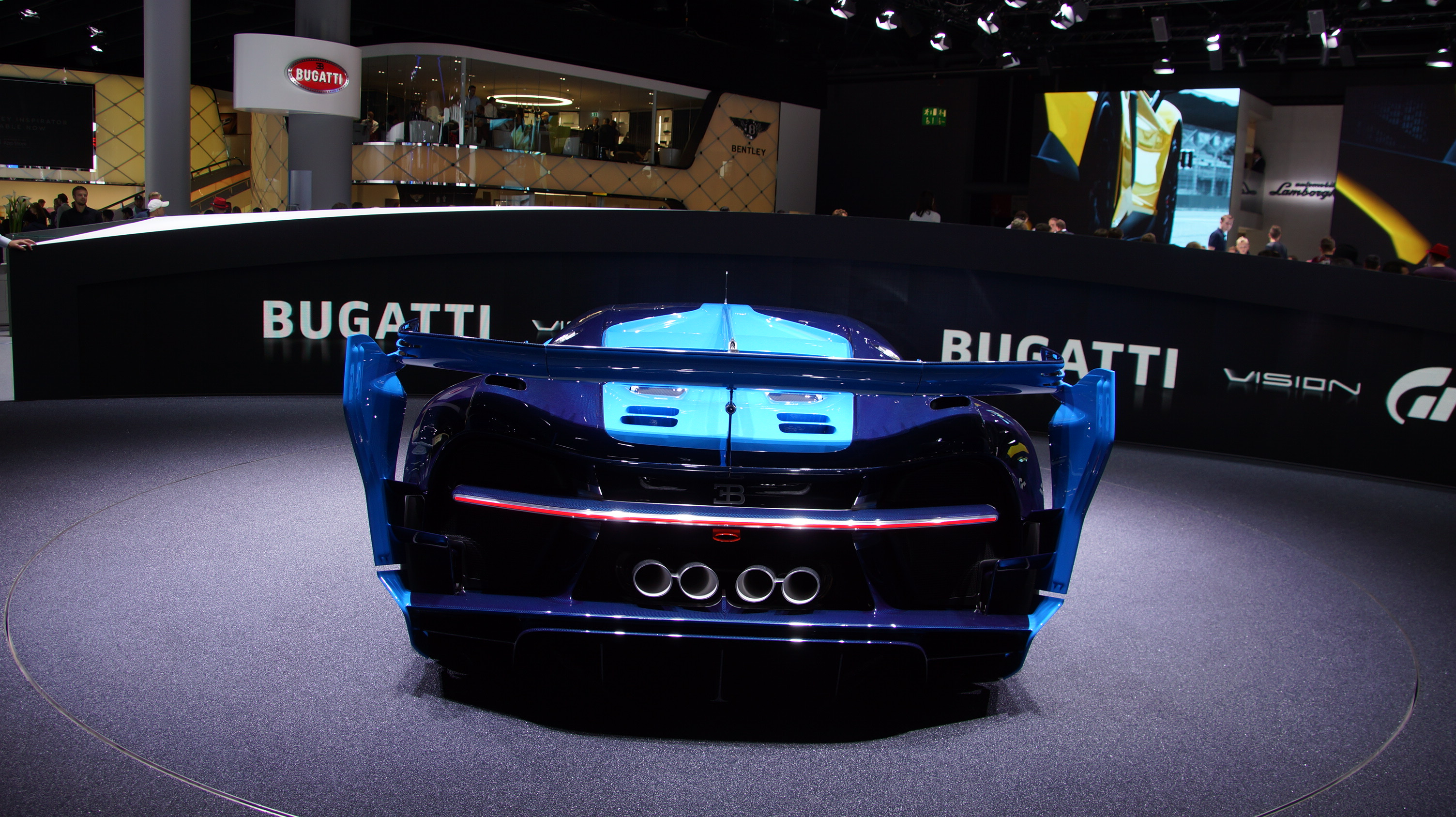
Rear view of the Vision Gran Turismo

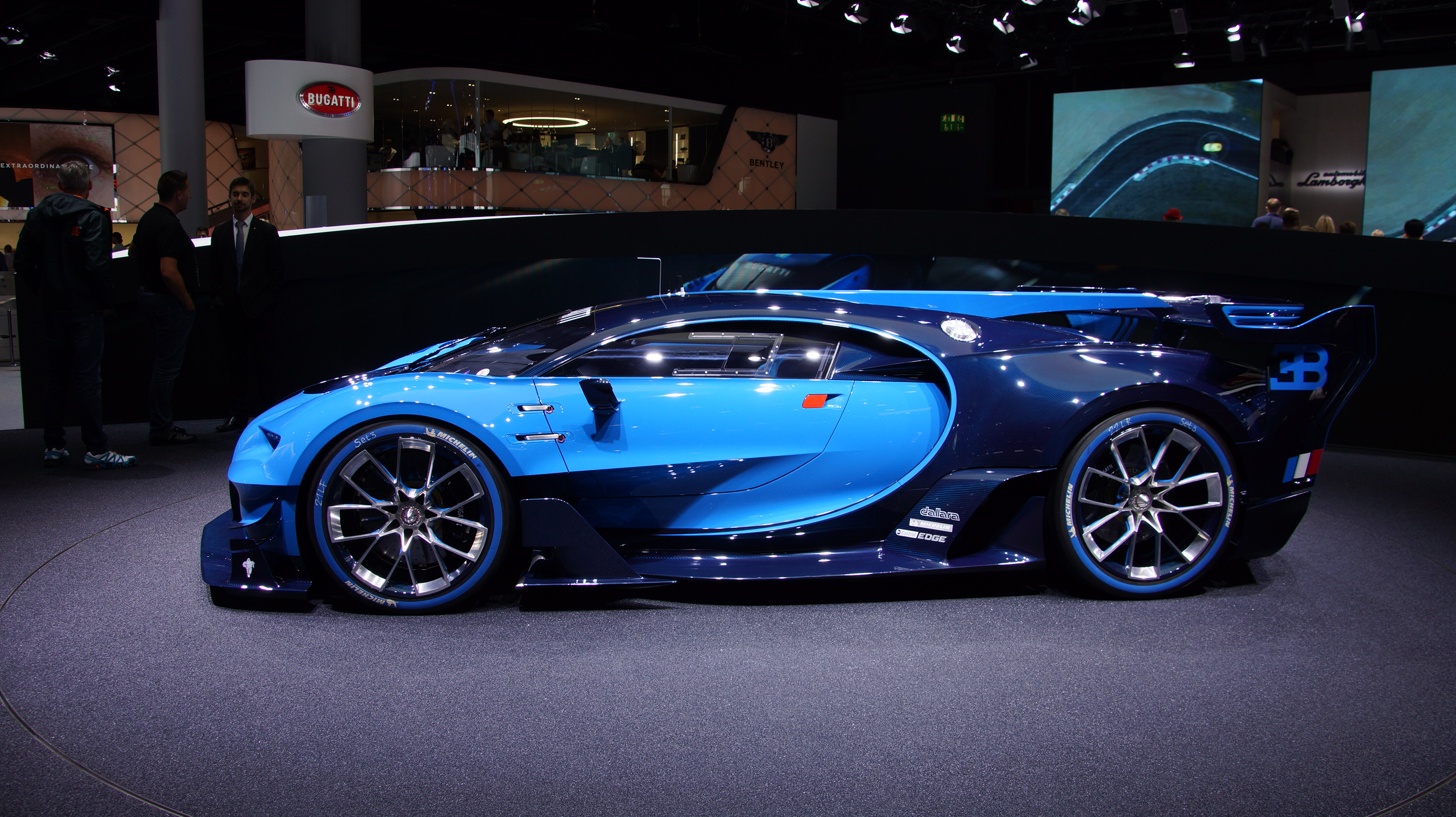
Side view of the Vision Gran Turismo

Designed by Achim Anscheidt, Sasha Selipanov, Etienne Salome, and Frank Heyl, the Vision Gran Turismo is a two-door concept car combining the looks of a road car and a LMP1 prototype. The Vision Gran Turismo belongs under the project of the same name.

The Vision Gran Turismo contains an 8.0 L quad-turbocharged W16 engine, heavily modified. The top speed has never been calculated in a real circuit, but using a virtual Circuit de la Sarthe simulator, the approximate top speed is 447 km/h (278 mph). A seven-speed dual-clutch transmission is used, which delivers the power to all four wheels, therefore making the Vision Gran Turismo an all-wheel drive car.

The car uses the pre-production Bugatti Chiron chassis #6.

The car also uses a carbon fiber structure for the body.

Many aerodynamic features, primarily carbon fiber, are present along the Vision Gran Turismo body, with a LMP1-style shark fin and active rear wing, large front splitter, side air intakes, multiple NACA ducts, and DTM-style dive planes.

== Ownership ==
Taking the Vision Gran Turismo to service would cost the owner US$20,000, and one set of Michelin spare tires for the Vision Gran Turismo costs the owner US$93,000.

The Vision Gran Turismo also contains a crate for the owner's manuals, keys, and parts. It also contains a center lock wheel nut remover, jumper cables, four remote keys (two keys for suspension adjustment, two keys for lights and spoiler adjustments), antenna piece, and an owner's manual.

Only two people in the world have purchased and owned the Vision Gran Turismo since its unveiling. The car was originally bought by Prince Badr bin Saud of Saudi Arabia through a secret bid, along with a Bugatti Chiron that contained the same color scheme as the Vision Gran Turismo. The car was then subsequently sold to Hezy Shaked, Chairman and CSO of Tillys.

== See also ==
- Bugatti Chiron
- Gran Turismo Sport
- Vision Gran Turismo
- Gran Turismo 7
