= Nileh Safid =

Nileh Safid نيله سفيد
- Village
- Location within Iran
- Coordinates: 33°37′54″N 48°53′21″E
- Country: Iran
- Province: Lorestan
- County: Dorud
- Bakhsh: Silakhor
- Rural District: Chalanchulan

Population (2006)
  - Total: 200
- Time zone: UTC+3:30 (IRST)
  - Summer (DST): UTC+4:30 (IRDT)

Nileh Safid (Persian: نيله سفيد, also Romanized as Nīleh Safīd; also known as Nīleh and Nīla) is a village in Chalanchulan Rural District, Silakhor District, Dorud County, Lorestan Province, Iran. At the 2006 census, its population was 200, in 49 families.
