= Sarfraz Sattar =

Pakistan Army retired general

Lieutenant-General Sarfraz Sattar
- سرفراز ستار

Director General Strategic Plans Division Force
- In office September 2017 – November 2019

Commander II Corps, Multan
- In office December 2016 – September 2017

General Officer Commanding (GOC) of 8th Infantry Division
- In office 2015–2016

Director-General of Military Intelligence
- In office 2013–2015

Military service
- Allegiance: Pakistan
- Branch/service: Pakistan Army
- Years of service: 1984 – 2019
- Rank: Lieutenant-General

Sarfraz Sattar (Urdu: سرفراز ستار) HI(M) is a retired three star Pakistan Army general who had the post of Director General Strategic Plans Division (Strategic Plans Division Force). He also commanded II Corps, Multan. Before that he was General Officer Commanding (GOC) of 8th Infantry Division, Sialkot. He belongs to the armoured corps and 70th Pakistan Military Academy Long Course. He was promoted to Lieutenant General on 30 September 2016. COAS Qamar Bajwa installed Lt General Sarfraz Sattar as Colonel Commandant Armoured Corps on 15 November 2019. Sattar also served as the Director General of Military Intelligence and military attaché to India.

During General Raheel Sharif’s stint as the COAS, the most junior lieutenant general was Sarfraz Sattar. It would not be out of place to mention here that General (retd) Raheel Sharif, before his retirement, suggested his name as one of the options for the military command in 2019, as the future successor to the General Qamar Bajwa, for continuation of his policies.

== alleged house arrested ==
It was alleged by the various Indian news outlets that General Sarfraz Sattar was arrested and kept under house arrest for his opposition against extension of tenure of Pakistan's then army chief General Qamar Javed Bajwa in November 2019. It was claimed that General Sattar was unhappy with Bajwa's extension as Sattar wanted to become chief himself.
