= Nilu27 =

Upcoming sports car by Nilu27

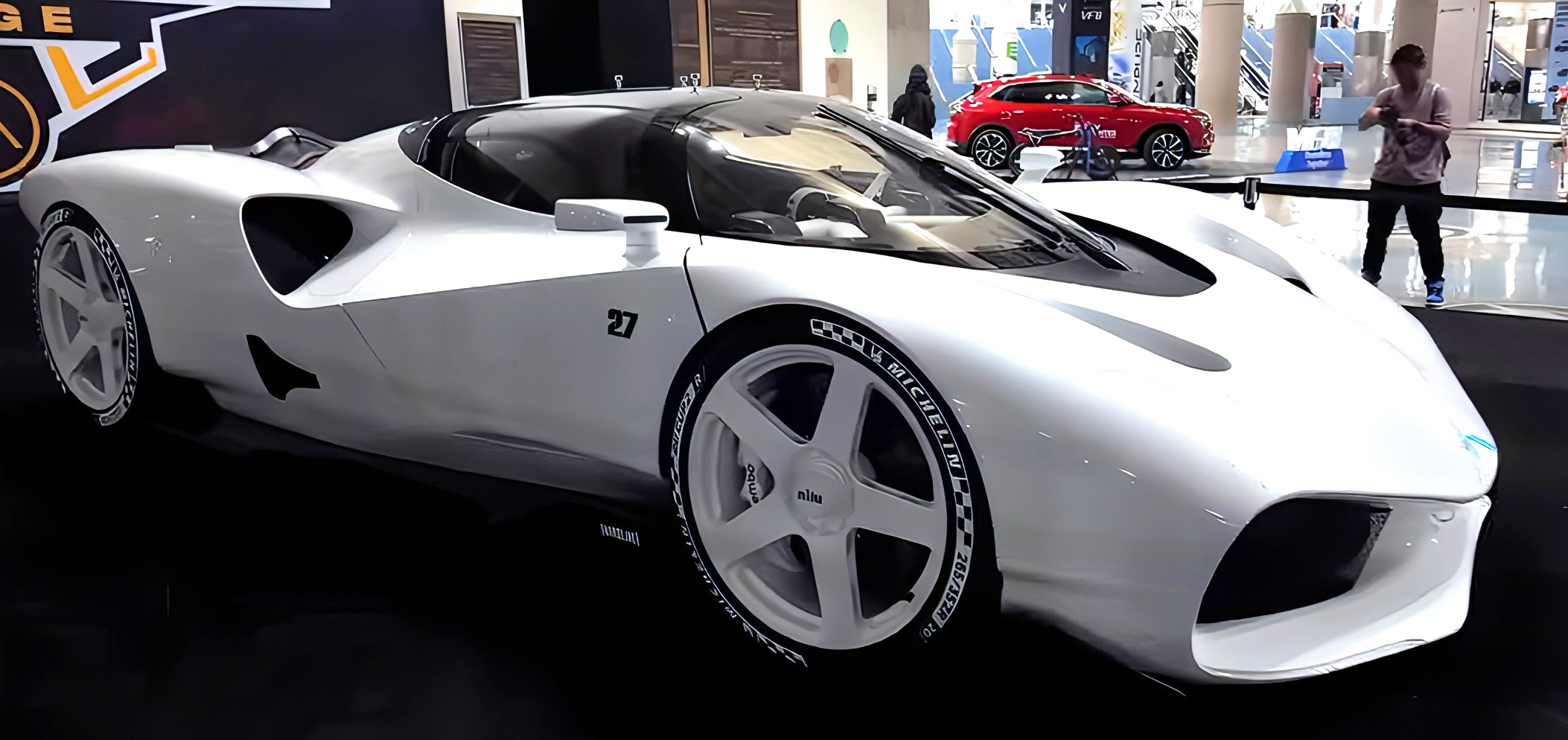

Overview
- Manufacturer: Nilu27
- Production: 15+54 road cars
- Assembly: Irvine, California, United States

Body and chassis
- Class: Track only sports car (S)
- Layout: Mid-engine, rear-wheel drive

Powertrain
- Engine: 6.5L naturally-aspirated V12
- Power output: 1,070 hp (798 kW; 1,085 PS)
- Transmission: 7-speed manual

Dimensions
- Curb weight: 1,200 kg (2,646 lb)

The Nilu27 is a sports car project announced by former Koenigsegg, Lamborghini and Bugatti designer Sasha Selipanov.

== Name ==
The car's name combines the names of the founders’ daughters, Nica and Lucia, and the number 27 honors a racing number worn by F1 drivers such as Gilles Villeneuve and Jean Alesi in the 1980s and 1990s.
