= Nilu, Fars =

Nilu نيلو
- Village
- Location within Iran
- Coordinates: 29°02′10″N 54°46′08″E
- Country: Iran
- Province: Fars
- County: Neyriz
- Bakhsh: Qatruyeh
- Rural District: Qatruyeh

Population (2006)
  - Total: 245
- Time zone: UTC+3:30 (IRST)
  - Summer (DST): UTC+4:30 (IRDT)

Nilu (Persian: نيلو, also Romanized as Nīlū; also known as Nīlū Rastegār) is a village in Qatruyeh Rural District, Qatruyeh District, Neyriz County, Fars province, Iran. At the 2006 census, its population was 245, in 51 families.
