= Neela, Chakwal =

Coordinates: 33°10′N 72°37′E

Neela نیلہ Neelah
- Village
- Interactive map of Neela
- Country: Pakistan
- Province: Punjab
- District: Chakwal
- Tehsil: District Chakwal

Neela or Neelah (Urdu: نیلہ) is a village located in Chakwal District, Punjab, Pakistan. Part of the Chakwal Tehsil, it lies about 4 kilometers from the M2 motorway and about 45 kilometers from Chakwal city.
