= Punjab Rangers =

Pakistani paramilitary force

Pakistan Rangers (Punjab) پنجاب رینجرز
- Insignia of the Punjab Rangers
- Common name: Punjab Rangers

Agency overview
- Formed: 1942; 84 years ago (as Sindh Rifles); July 3, 1977; 49 years ago (as Pakistan Rangers Punjab)
- Employees: 16,100

Jurisdictional structure
- Federal agency: Pakistan
- Operations jurisdiction: Pakistan
- Map of Punjab Rangers jurisdiction (in red) within Pakistan
- Governing body: Ministry of Interior
- Constituting instrument: Pakistan Rangers Ordinance, 1959
- General nature: Federal law enforcement
- Specialist jurisdictions: Paramilitary law enforcement, counter insurgency, riot control; National border patrol, security, integrity

Operational structure
- Headquarters: Lahore, Punjab
- Agency executive: Major-General Atif Bin Akram, Director General
- Parent agency: Civil Armed Forces

Website
- pakistanrangers.punjab.gov.pk

The Punjab Rangers (formally Pakistan Rangers (Punjab)) (Punjabi:پنجاب رینجرز) is a federal paramilitary force in Pakistan. It is one of nine Civil Armed Forces and is one of two Ranger forces with the other one being the Sindh Rangers, which operates in Sindh province. The paramilitary operates administratively under the Interior Ministry of Pakistan but is usually commanded by officers on secondment from the Pakistan Army. Their primary purpose is to secure and defend about 1,300 km (810 mi) of the northern part of the border with neighbouring India. They are also often involved in major internal and external security operations with the regular Pakistani military and provide assistance to municipal and provincial police forces to maintain law and order against crime, terrorism and unrest.

As part of the paramilitary Civil Armed Forces, the Rangers can fall under the full operational control of the Pakistan Armed Forces when necessary. This is not exclusively limited to a wartime scenario, but whenever Article 245 of the Constitution of Pakistan is invoked to provide "military aid to civil power".

== Role ==
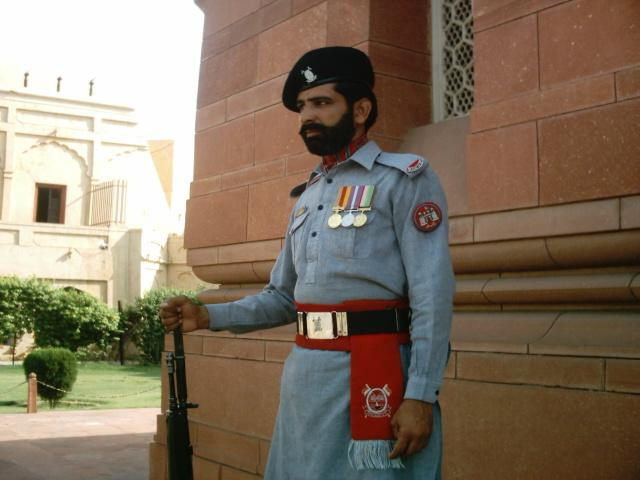
A Ranger in ceremonial dress guarding the Tomb of Muhammad Iqbal in Iqbal Park, Lahore.

Aside from the primary objective of guarding the border with India, the Rangers are also responsible for maintaining internal security in Pakistan and serve as a major law enforcement organization in the country. Despite this, they do not possess the power to make arrests like the regular police with the exception of when the state temporarily sanctions them with such an authority in times of extreme crisis. Their primary objective as an internal security force is to prevent and suppress crime by taking preventive security measures, cracking down on criminals and thwarting organized crime with the use of major force. All suspects apprehended by the Rangers during a crackdown are later handed over to police for further investigation and possible prosecution when the chaos is brought under control. The same privileges are also temporarily granted by the government to other security organizations such as the Frontier Corps for the same reasons.

The Rangers are also tasked with securing important monuments and guarding national assets in all major cities, including Islamabad.

In the past, they have also served as prison guards for high-profile terrorists until they were withdrawn from such duties.

=== Wagah–Attari flag-lowering ceremony ===
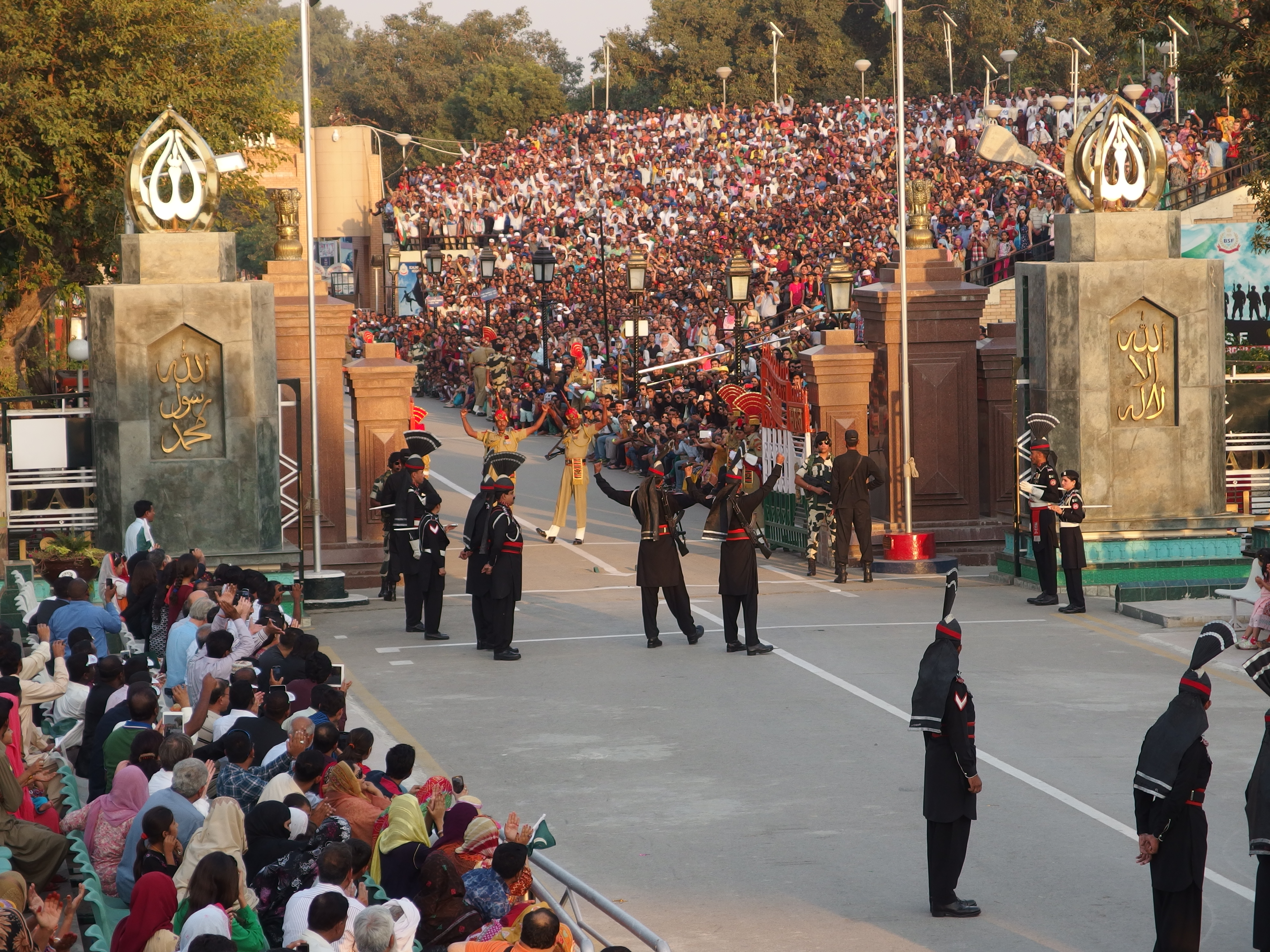
In ceremonial dress, Indian BSF personnel and Pakistani Rangers face off against each other in the Wagah-Attari border ceremony, October 2014.

The "lowering of the flags" ceremony at the Attari–Wagah border is a daily military practice that the security forces of India (Border Security Force) and Pakistan (Pakistan Rangers) have jointly followed since 1959. The drill is characterised by elaborate and rapid dance-like manoeuvres and raising legs as high as possible, which have been described as "colourful". It is both a symbol of the two countries’ rivalry, and a display of brotherhood and cooperation between the two nations.

== History ==
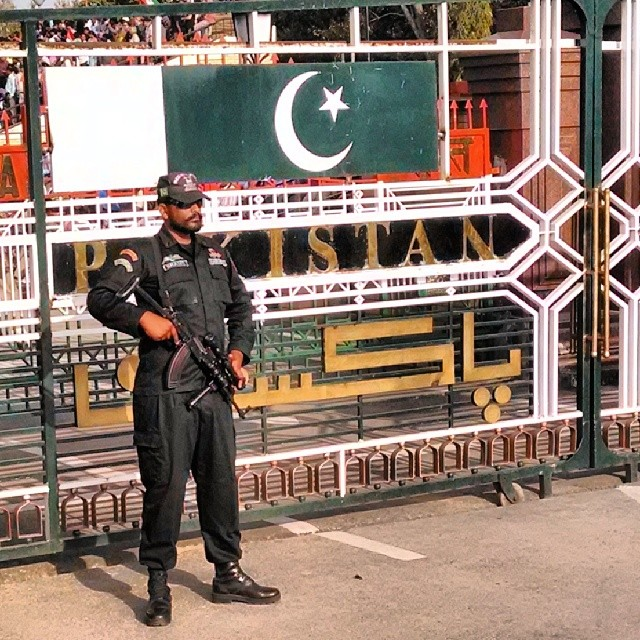
A Punjab Ranger at the Wagah border.

The origins of the Rangers go back to 7 October 1958 where small paramilitaries were restructured and renamed to the West Pakistan Rangers. The Rangers fought alongside the Pakistan Army in several conflicts, namely the Indo-Pakistani War of 1965 and the Indo-Pakistani War of 1971.

In 1972, following the independence of East Pakistan and Legal Framework Order No. 1970 by the Government of Pakistan, the force was officially renamed from the West Pakistan Rangers to the Pakistan Rangers and put under control of the Ministry of Defence with its headquarters at Lahore.

In 1973, under the authority of the Pakistan Army's Special Service Group (SSG), the Punjab Rangers and Islamabad Police raided the Iraqi embassy in Islamabad after an intelligence report disclosed the presence of armaments and funds meant for Baloch insurgents from a joint Iraqi-Soviet operation.

In 1974, the Rangers became part of the Civil Armed Forces under the Ministry of the Interior, where it has remained since.

In late 1989, due to growing riots and the worsening situation of law and order in the province of Sindh, a new force was raised for a strategic anti-dacoit operation. The paramilitary force operated under the name of the Mehran Force and consisted of the then-existing Sindh Rangers command and three Army battalions (including from the Northern Light Infantry). The Mehran Force was under the direct command of the Director General Rangers with a new headquarters in Karachi.

Following these events, the federal government substantially increased the strength of the Rangers and raised a separate paramilitary headquarters in Sindh. On 1 July 1995 the Rangers were divided into two separate forces, the Punjab Rangers and the Sindh Rangers. The Mehran Force and other paramilitary units operating in Sindh were merged into the Sindh Rangers.

Due to their close association with the military, the Rangers also saw combat against regular Indian troops during the Kargil War of 1999 in Kashmir.

Pakistan Rangers song.
- Pakistan Rangers song

In 2007, the Rangers alongside regular Pakistani soldiers and SSG commandos participated in Operation Silence against a Jihadist private militia in Islamabad. The conflict started when, after 18 months of tensions between government authorities and Islamist militants, they attacked the Punjab Rangers guarding the nearby Ministry of Environment building and set it ablaze and subsequently locked themselves inside the Red Mosque.

Two years later, in 2009, the Rangers once again participated in a special military operation in Lahore alongside the SSG, when twelve terrorists operating for the Taliban attacked the Manawan Police Academy in Lahore. The operation ended with eight militants killed and four captured. Later that year, the Government of Pakistan deployed the Punjab Rangers to secure the outskirts of Islamabad when the Taliban had taken over the Buner, Lower Dir, Swat and Shangla districts. Following these incidents, the Rangers participated in the Pakistan Army's Operation Black Thunderstorm.

The Rangers have also provided Special Police Units (SPUs) for various peacekeeping missions during the Yugoslav Wars (United Nations Protection Force - Croatia/Bosnia and Herzegovina) and in Haiti (United Nations Stabilization Mission - Haiti). SPUs are tasked with protection and security for UN officials, providing operational and backup support, responding to threats to public order, and assist various humanitarian agencies. Other international peacekeeping operations have included the Democratic Republic of the Congo and Kosovo.

== Operations in South Punjab ==
Punjab Rangers have also been involved in various operations against bandits, gangs and terrorist networks embedded in Southern parts of the Pakistan's Punjab province. In the areas of Rajanpur District, Punjab Rangers have often been called in to aid Punjab Police against bandits. In April 2016, Rangers carried out successful small scale raids against Chotu gang in the Indus River Delta of Ranjanpur. Dacoits had been using Indus River Delta as their base for many years to carry out criminal activities across parts of Punjab, Sindh and Balochistan. Punjab Rangers in support from Punjab Police and Pakistan Army launched joint operation codenamed as Operation Zarb-e-Ahan which lasted for about three weeks. Operation was highly successful in compelling bandits to surrender. As a result of active involvement of Punjab Rangers, the normalcy was restored in the strategic area Ranjanpur District, which connects three provinces of Pakistan.

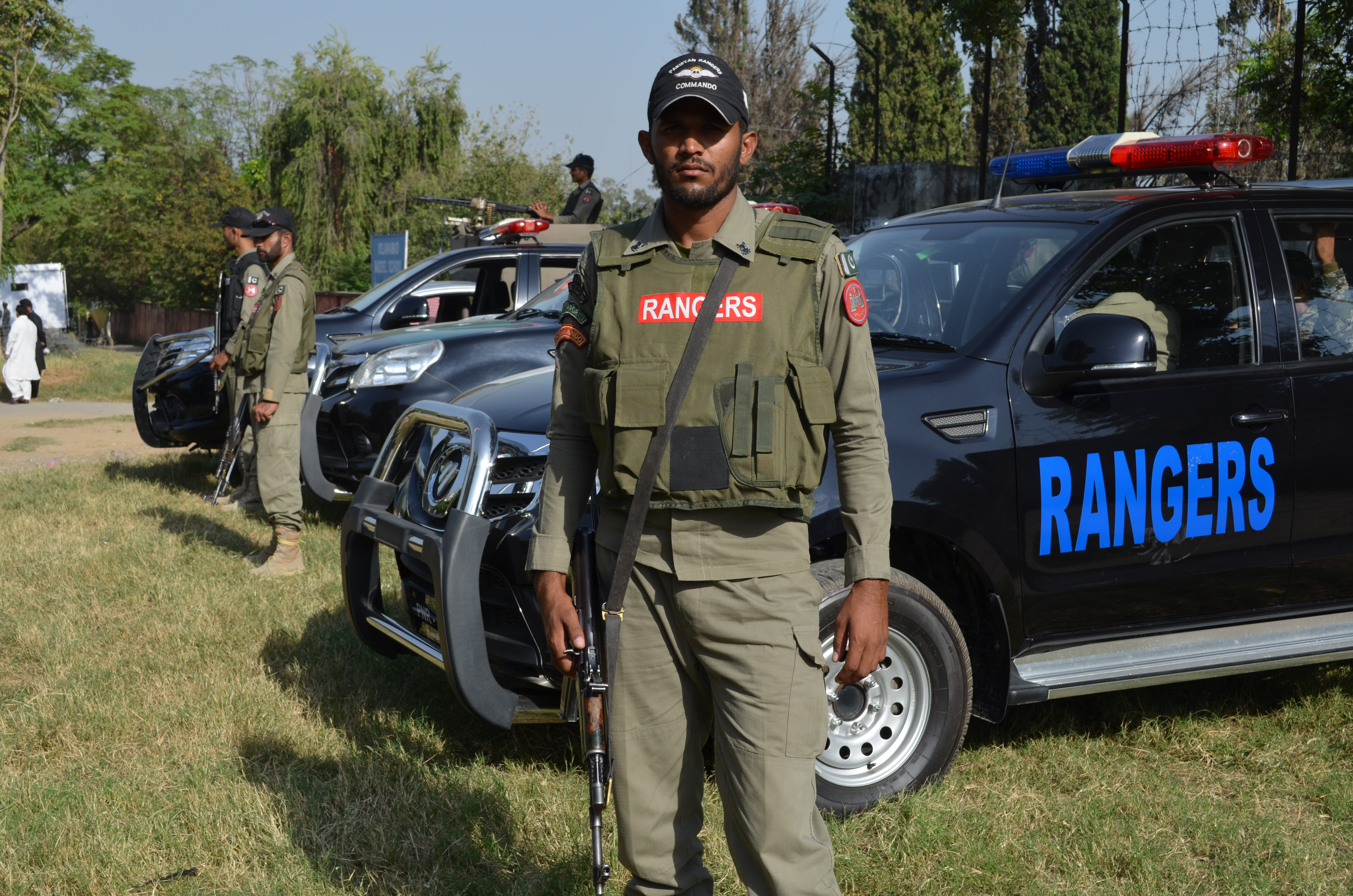
Punjab Rangers personnel deployed for Muharram security.

Punjab Rangers have also been active against several sectarian and extremist groups in the parts of South Punjab. In 2016, the ambit of Operation Zarb-e-Azb was expanded and it was decided that militant groups active in the regions of South Punjab would be targeted. Since then, Punjab Rangers along with Counter Terrorism Department (Pakistan) have participated in the highly sophisticated scores of Intelligence Based Operations (IBOs) to dismantle terror networks. Resultantly, South Punjab has witnessed drastic improvement in its security environment.

== Organisation ==
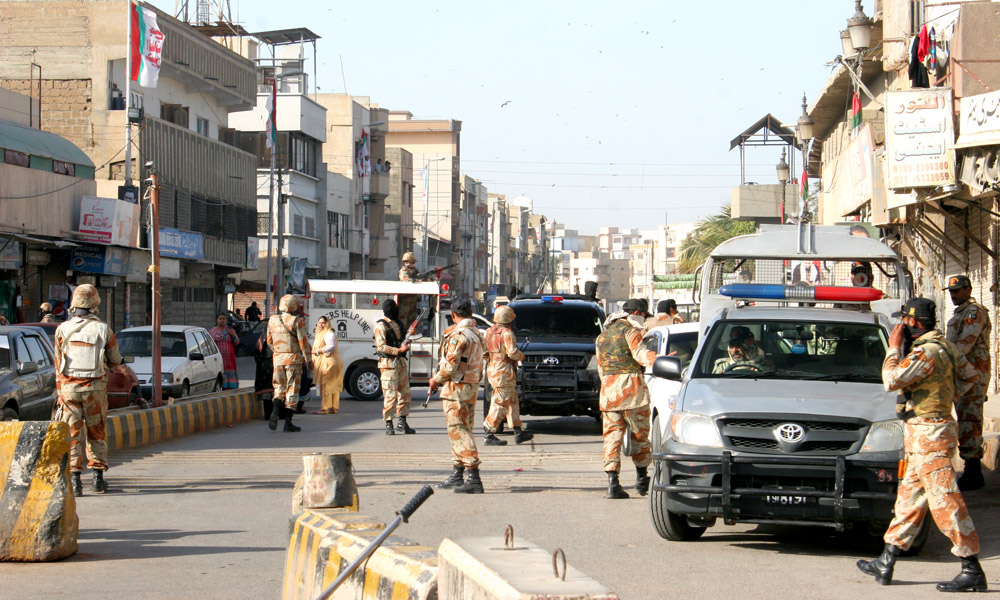
Rangers Pakistan Sindh 2015

The Rangers are led by a Director-General (DG) appointed by the Pakistan Army, and usually holds the two-star rank of major general. The DG Punjab Rangers WAS Major General Syed Asif Hussain until 2022 when Mohammad Qaddafi replaced him.

The majority of the other officers come from the Army, however some Rangers can be inducted as direct-entry sub-inspectors. These officers can reach a maximum rank of Senior Superintendent Rangers (SSR) - roughly equivalent to the army rank of lieutenant colonel. Personnel joining as sepoys can reach a maximum rank of honorary DSR (Deputy Superintendent Rangers), which would be equivalent to an Army captain.

The force consists of about 16,100 Rangers, divided into a number of smaller commands together with supporting units:

- Chenab Rangers (Sialkot)
- Sutlej Rangers (Lahore)
- Desert Rangers (Bahawalpur)
- Cholistan Rangers (Rahim Yar Khan)
- Indus Rangers
- Special Operations Rangers Troops (SORT)
- Rangers Punjab Academy, Lahore
- Rangers Punjab Academy, Mandi Bahauddin
- Punjab Rangers Teaching Hospital, Lahore

=== Training and selection ===
Selection for the Punjab Rangers lasts between 2–3 weeks and both male and female citizens of Pakistan can join. Disregarding physical fitness standards, an applicant must be between 18 and 25 years old to qualify for entry. The educational standards is that the applicant must have passed with a degree in the Faculty of Arts (FA) or Faculty of Science (FSc), roughly equivalent to a high school diploma in the United States, from a government-registered college. After selection and training, a Ranger can be deployed to anywhere in Punjab province (or countrywide in times of crisis) or abroad if necessary, according to the Pakistan Rangers Act of 1959.

=== Ranks and insignia ===
| Rank group | General / flag officers | Senior officers | | Junior officers |
|---|---|---|---|---|---|---|
| Pakistan Rangers |
| Pakistan Rangers | Director general ڈائریکٹر جنرل | Senior superintendent of the Rangers سینئر سپرنٹنڈنٹ۔ | Superintendent of the Rangers سپرنٹنڈنٹ | Deputy superintendent of the Rangers ڈپٹی سپرنٹنڈنٹ۔ | Inspector انسپکٹر | Direct Entry Sub inspector ڈائریکٹ انٹری سب انسپکٹر۔ |

| Rank group | Junior commissioned officers | | | Non commissioned officer | Enlisted |
|---|---|---|---|---|---|---|---|
| Pakistan Rangers | | | | | | | No insignia |
| Pakistan Rangers | Senior inspector سینئر انسپکٹر۔ | Inspector انسپکٹر | Sub inspector سب انسپکٹر۔ | Havildar حوالدار۔ | Naik نائیک۔ | Lance Naik لانس نائیک۔ | Sepoy سپاہی۔ |

== Standard equipment ==
- Automatic rifles – 7.62mm Heckler & Koch G3, 7.62mm Type 56, 9mm Steyr AUG
- Submachine guns – 9mm Heckler & Koch MP5
- Pistols – Glock series, Sigma series
- Sniper rifles – POF PSR-90, Steyr SSG 69
- Hand grenades – ARGES P84 (POF made)
- Anti-tank weapons – RPG-7, M40 recoilless rifle
- Machine guns – 7.62mm Rheinmetall MG3 (POF made)
- Heavy machine guns – 12.7mm Type 54 (POF made)
- Mortars – Various locally produced in use
- Bulletproof jackets – Various local and foreign types
- Helmets – Various indigenously produced helmets
- Optics – NVGs
- Utility vehicles – Toyota Hilux, APC Saad/Talha

== Former Director-Generals ==
| Name | From | To |
|---|---|---|
| Major General Hussain Mehdi | 2002 | 2007 |
| Major General Haroon Aslam | 2007 | 2008 |
| Major General Muhammad Nawaz | 2008 | 2011 |
| Major General Hilal Hussain | 2011 | 2013 |
| Major General Ghayur Mehmood | 2013 | 2015 |
| Major General Tahir Javed Khan | 2015 | 2015 |
| Major General Umar Farooq Burki | 2015 | 2016 |
| Major General Azhar Naveed Hayat | 2016 | 2018 |
| Major General Saqib Mehmood Malik | 2018 | 2020 |
| Major General Aamir Majeed | 2020 | December 2021 |
| Major General Syed Asif Hussain | Dec 2021 | September 2022 |
| Major General Muhammad Qaddafi | Sept 2022 | December 2023 |
| Major General Muhammad Atif Bin Akram | Dec 2023 | Incumbent |

== Notable officers ==
- Sub-Inspector Amarjeet Singh – the first Pakistani Sikh officer of the Punjab Rangers.

== Gallery ==
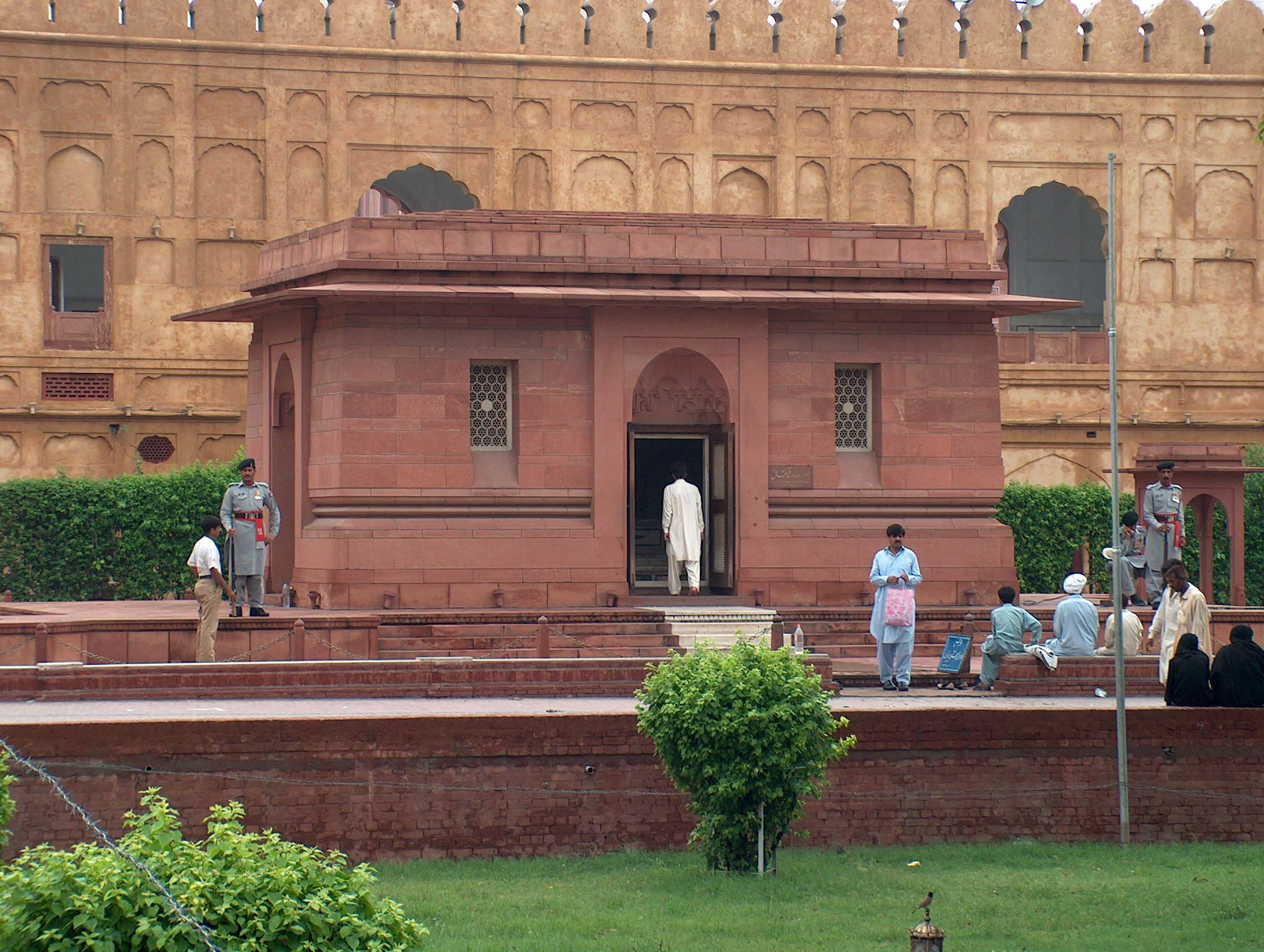
Pakistani Rangers guarding the Tomb of Muhammad Iqbal in Iqbal Park, Lahore

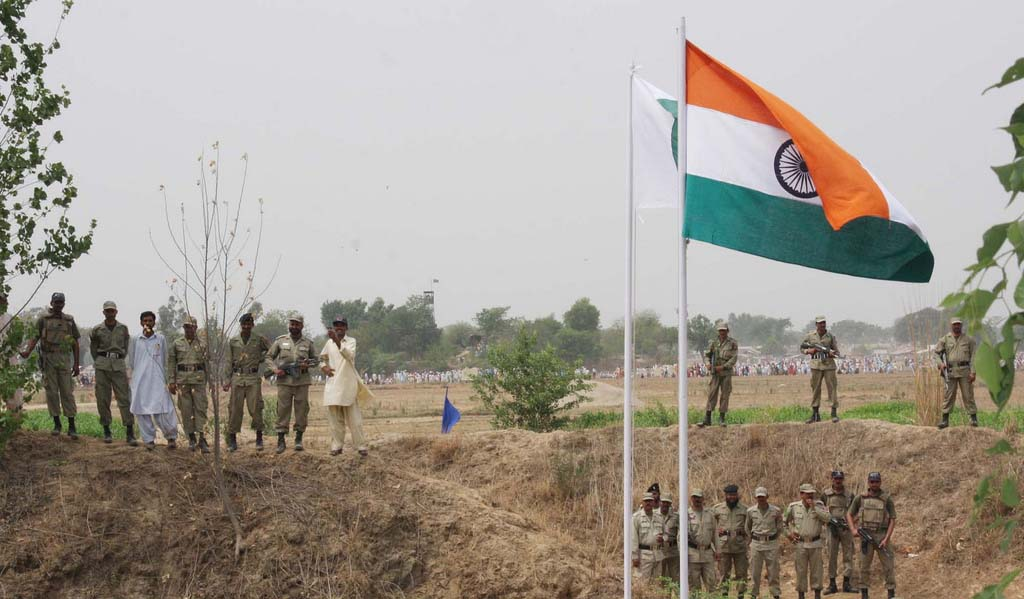
Baba Chamliyal Mela at the Indo-Pakistani International Border, near Jammu.

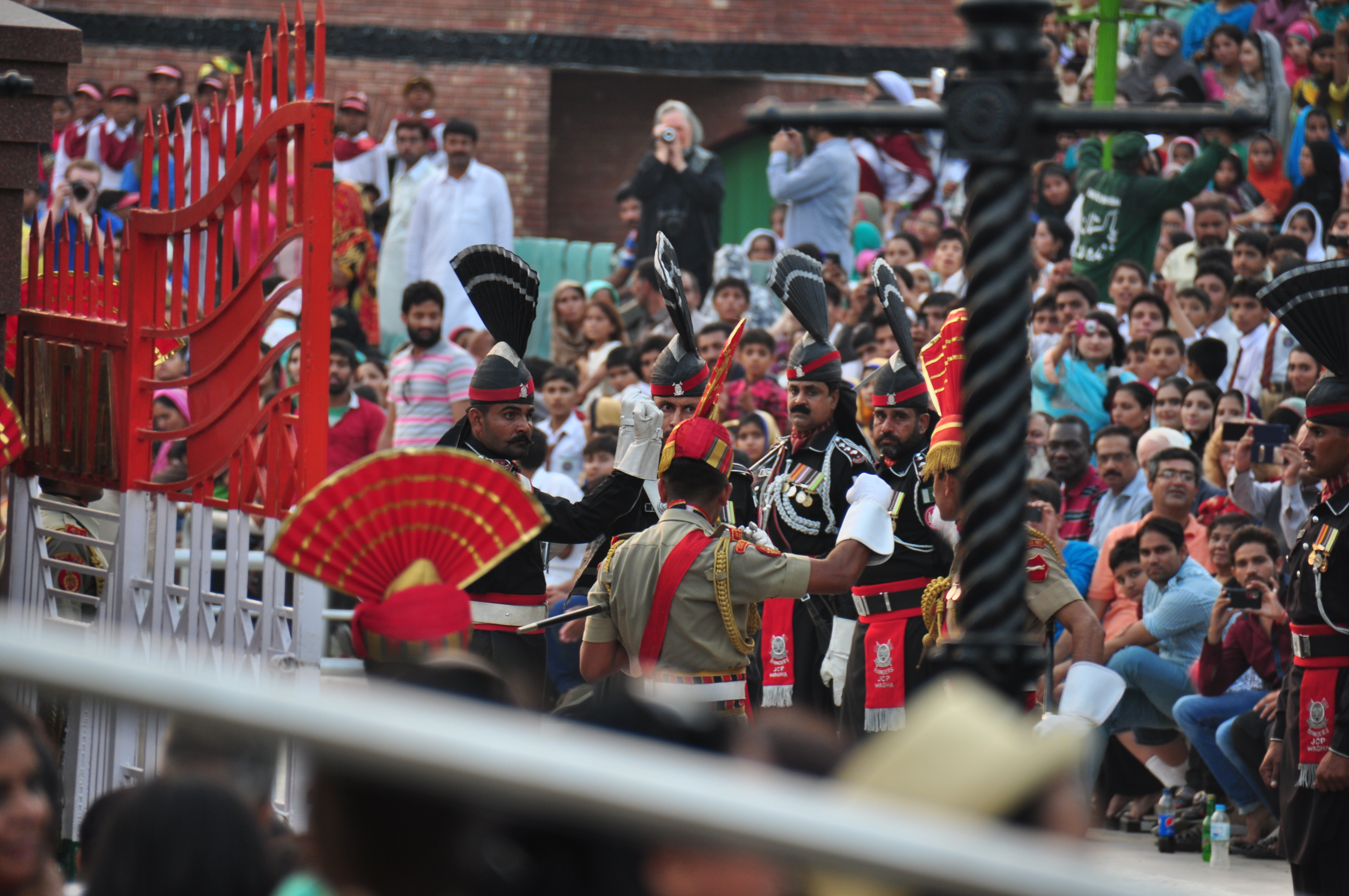
Indian BSF personnel and Pakistani Rangers during the Wagah-Attari border ceremony.

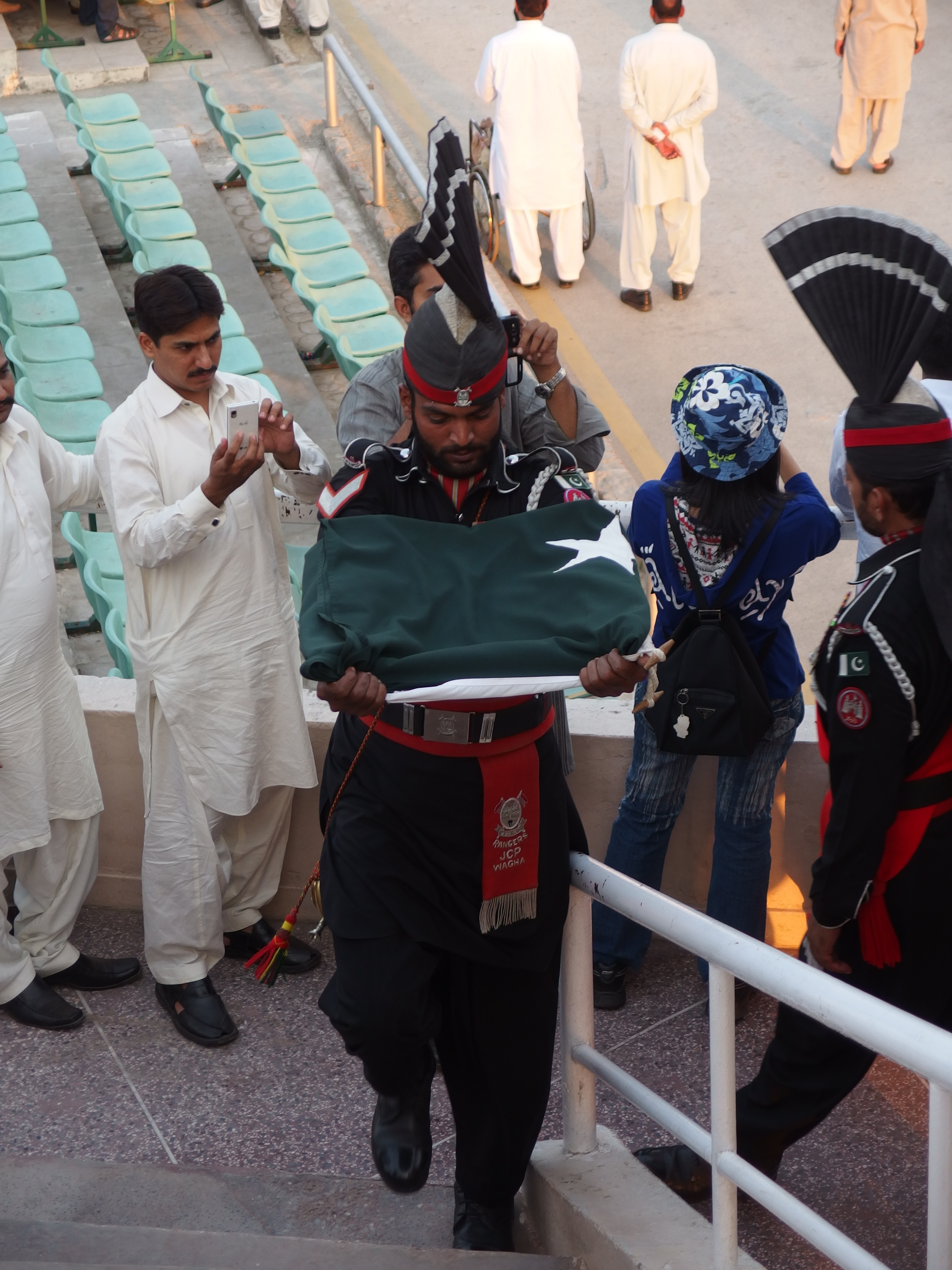
A Pakistani Ranger during the Wagah-Attari border ceremony.

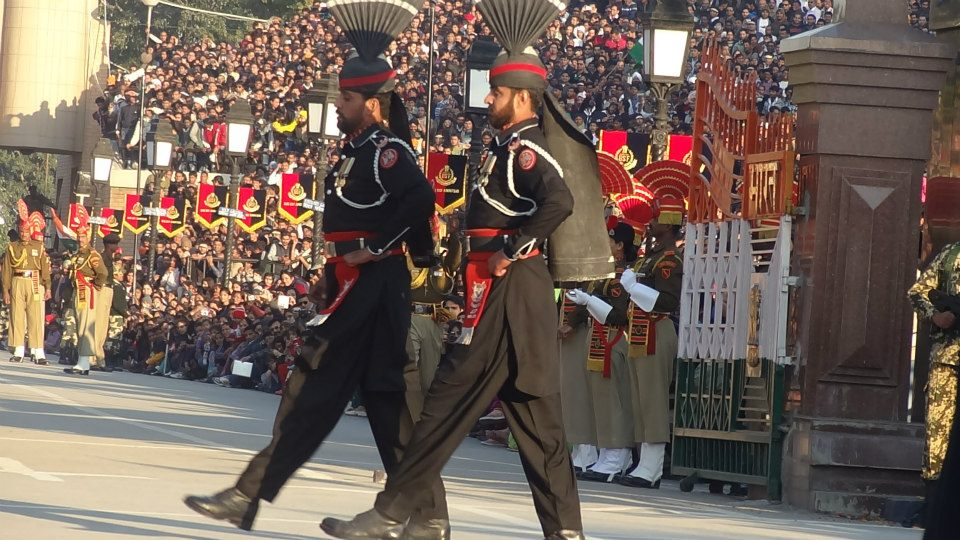
Pakistani Rangers at the Wagah-Attari border crossing.

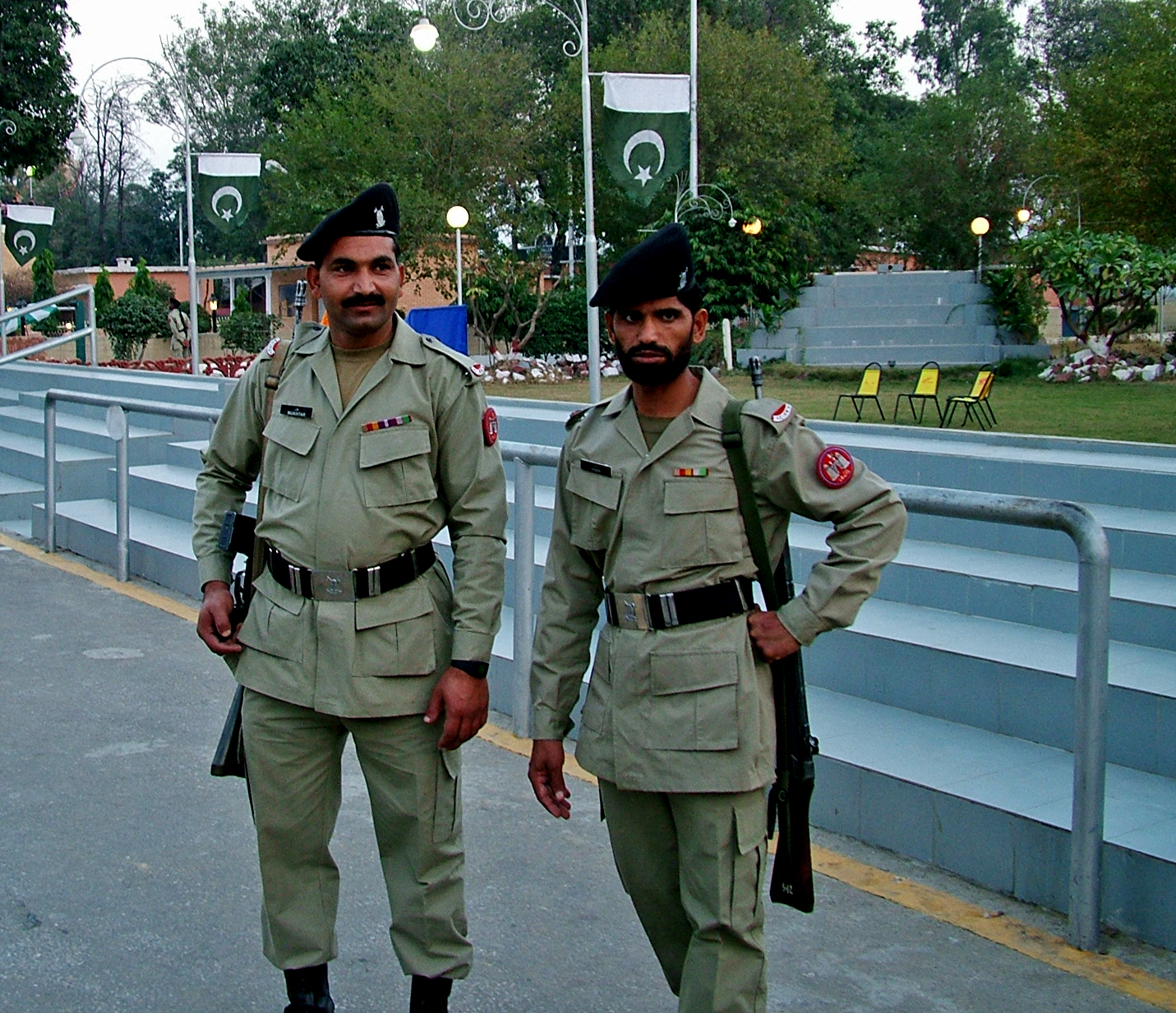
Punjab Rangers near the Indo-Pakistani border with G3 assault rifles.

== See also ==
- Civil Armed Forces
- National Guard (Pakistan)
- Pakistan Levies
