= List of automotive superlatives =

Automotive superlatives include attributes such as the smallest, largest, fastest, lightest, best-selling, and so on.

This list is limited to automobiles built after World War II. The list is also limited to production road cars that:

- Are constructed principally for retail sale to consumers for personal use transporting people on public roads. No commercial or industrial vehicles are included
- Have had 25 or more instances made by the original vehicle manufacturer offered for sale to the public in new condition (cars modified by either professional tuners or individuals are not eligible)
- Are street-legal in their intended markets and capable of passing any official tests or inspections required to be granted this status

Calendar years rather than "model years" are used except when explicitly marked as otherwise.

== Vehicle dimensions ==
=== Length ===
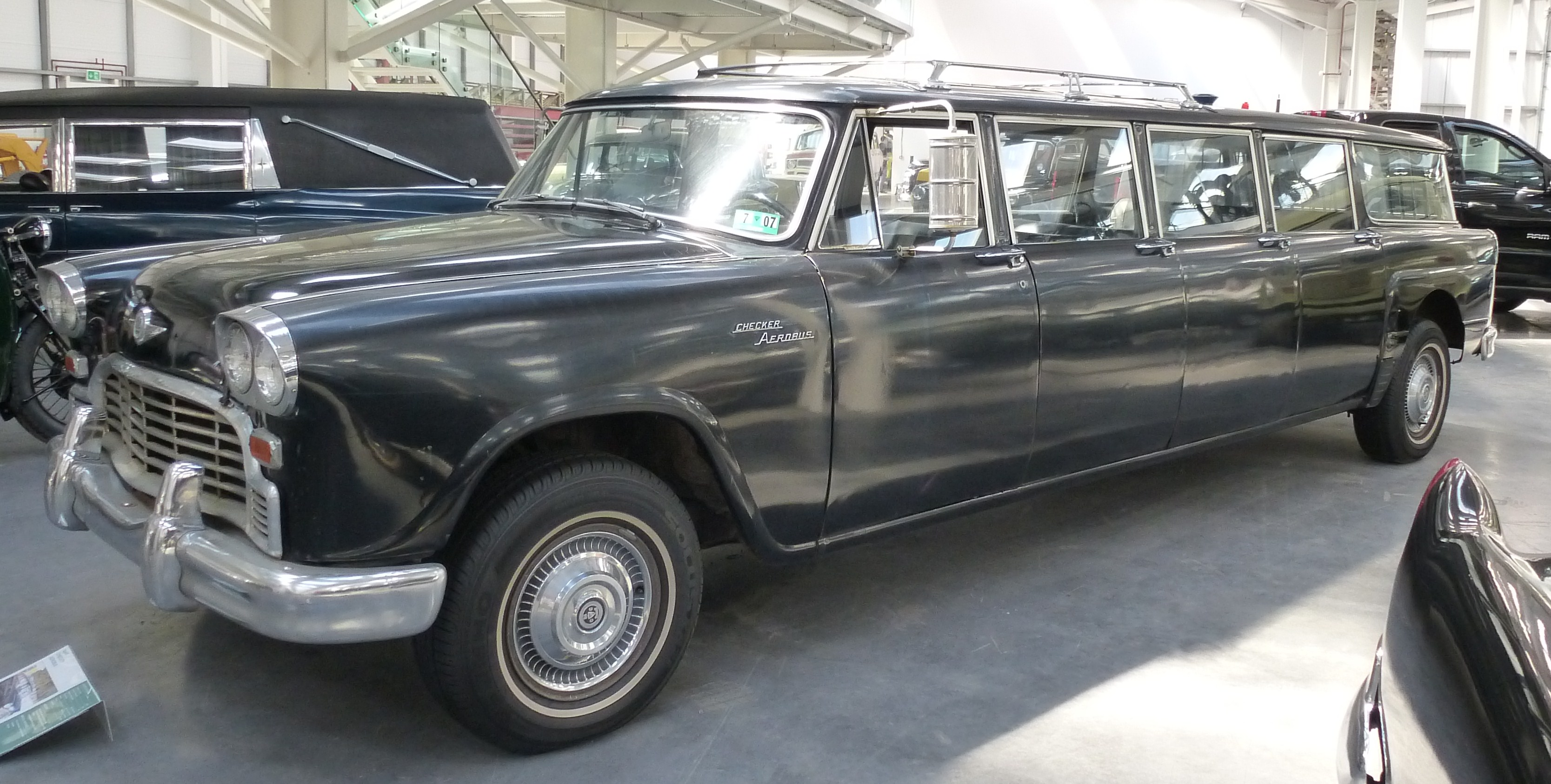
Checker Aerobus 9-door wagon

- Shortest
  - Current production car – 1,371 mm (54.0 in) – 2011 Peel P50
  - Four seat production car – 2,900 mm (114 in) – 1957–1959 BMW 600 (international)
- Longest
  - SUV – 5,804 mm (228.5 in) – Cadillac Escalade IQL
  - Van – 7,674 mm (302.1 in) – Iveco Daily 50C

=== Width (without mirrors) ===
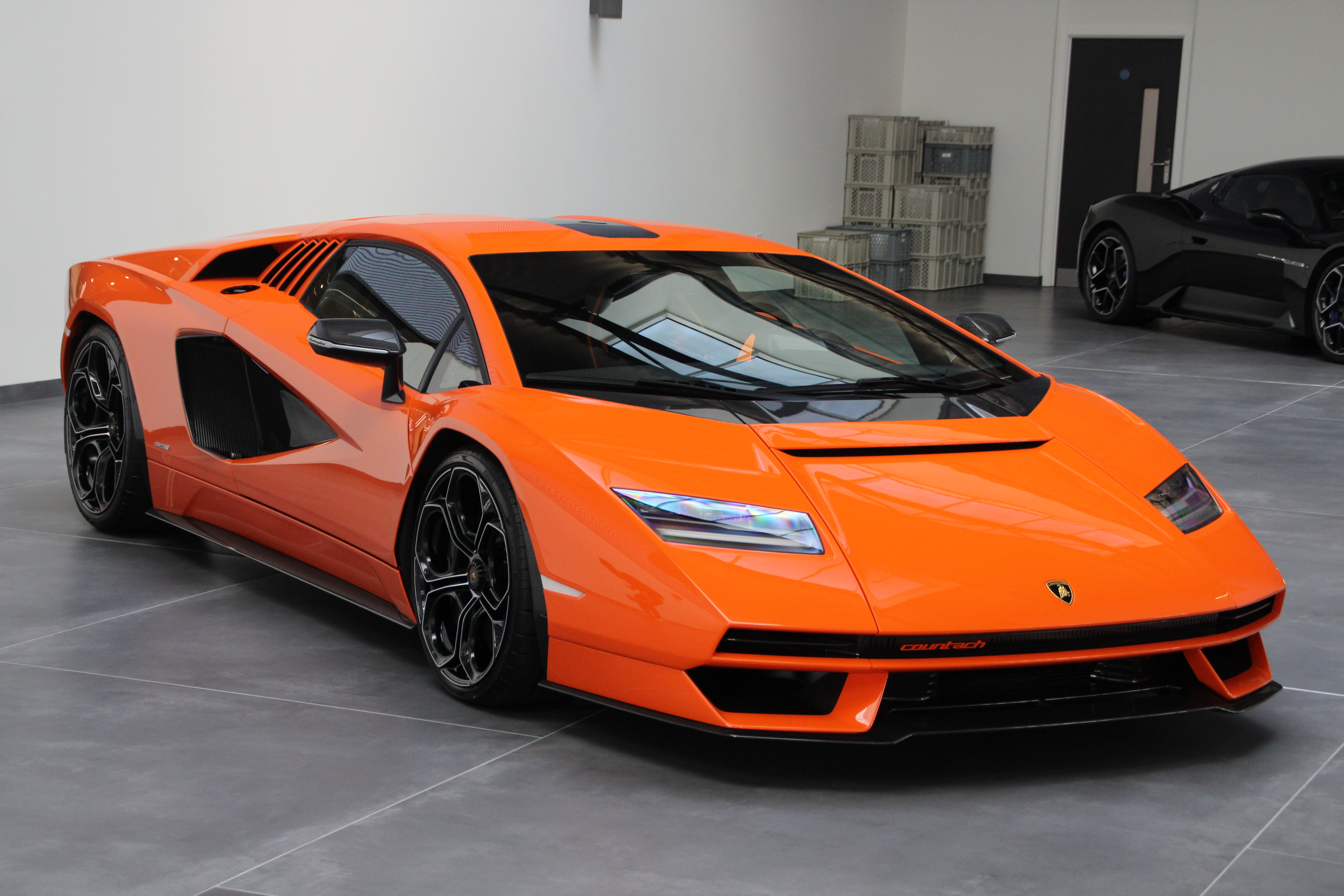
Lamborghini Countach LPI 800-4

- Widest
  - Car
    - Current production car – 2,099 mm (82.6 in) – Lamborghini Countach LPI 800-4
    - Limited production convertible – 2,100 mm (82.7 in) (armoured) – 1938–1943 Mercedes-Benz 770 W150
  - Pickup truck – 96.0 in (2,440 mm) – Ford Super Duty DRW
  - Van
    - Current van – 2,112 mm (83.1 in) Ford Transit

=== Height ===
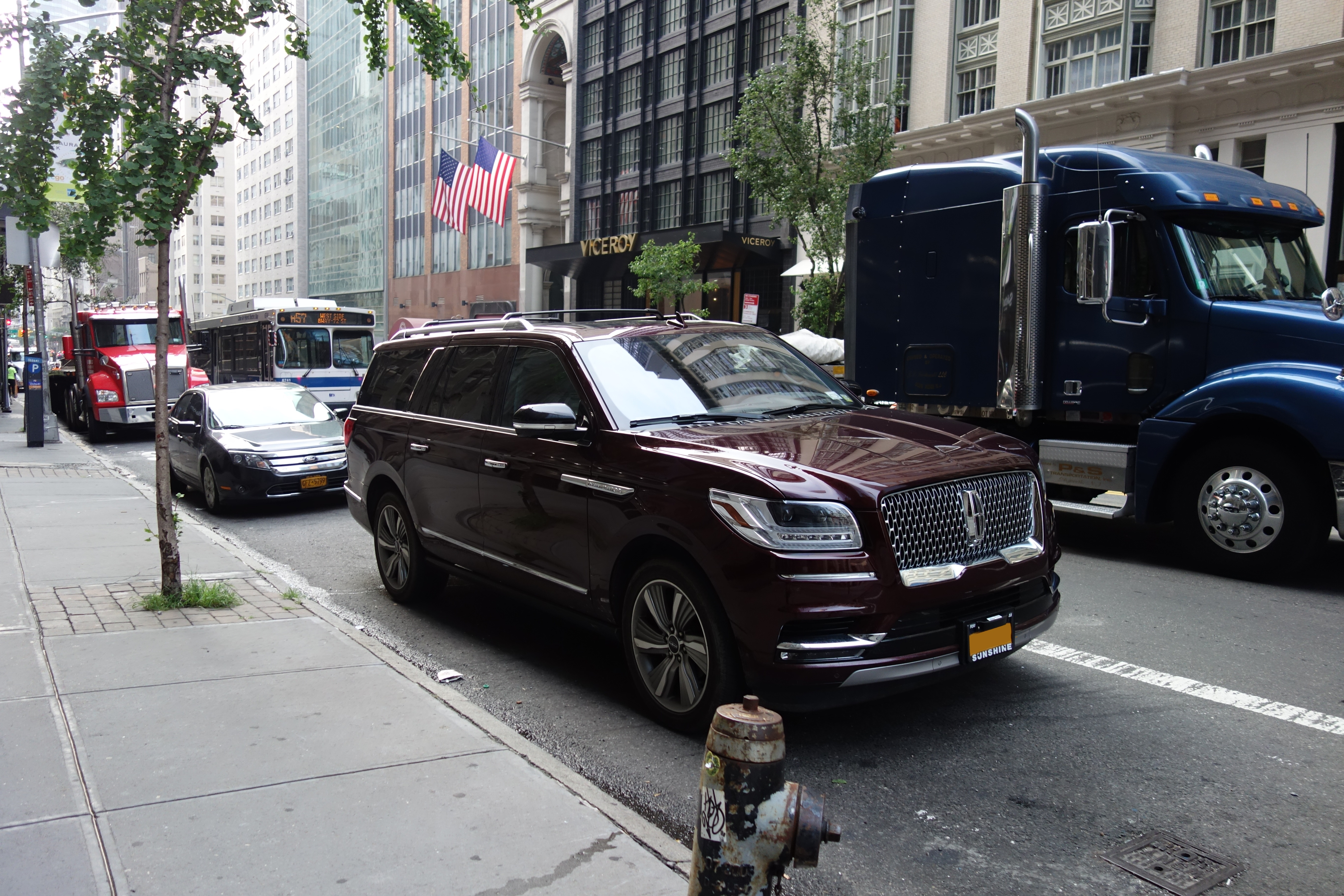
Lincoln Navigator (78.3 in tall) in front of a Ford Fusion (56.9 in tall)

- Tallest
  - Van – 3,055 mm (120.3 in) Mercedes-Benz Sprinter 906 L4H3
  - Mid-size pickup truck – 1,955 mm (77.0 in) Ford Ranger Raptor

=== Wheelbase ===
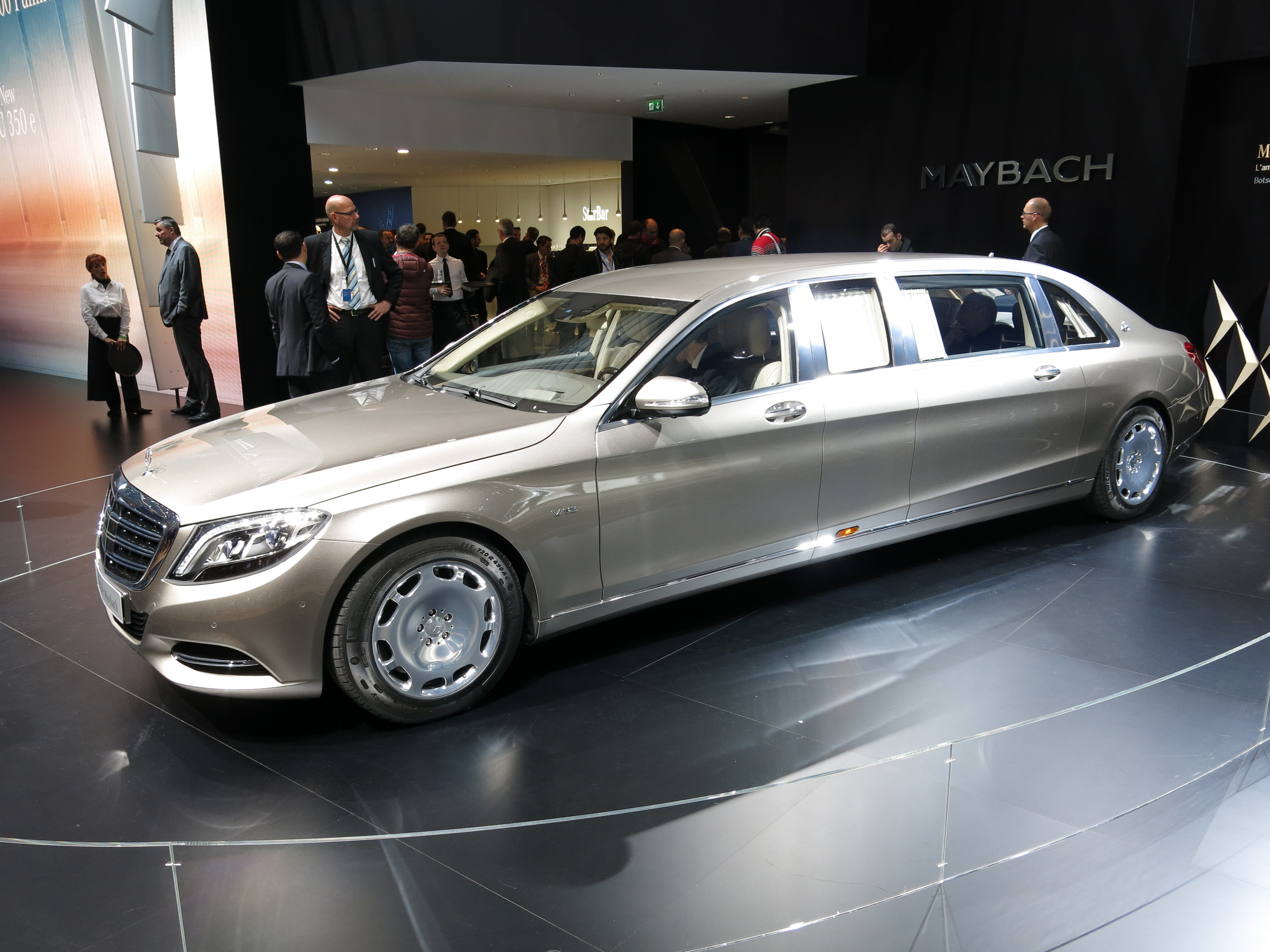
Mercedes-Maybach S600 Pullman

=== Track ===
- Widest front
  - Car
    - Production car – 1,784 mm (70.2 in) – 2022 Lamborghini Countach LPI 800-4
- Widest rear
  - Car
    - Production car – 1,722 mm (67.8 in) BMW i8
    - Production convertible – 1,722 mm (67.8 in) – BMW i8 Roadster

=== Curb weight ===
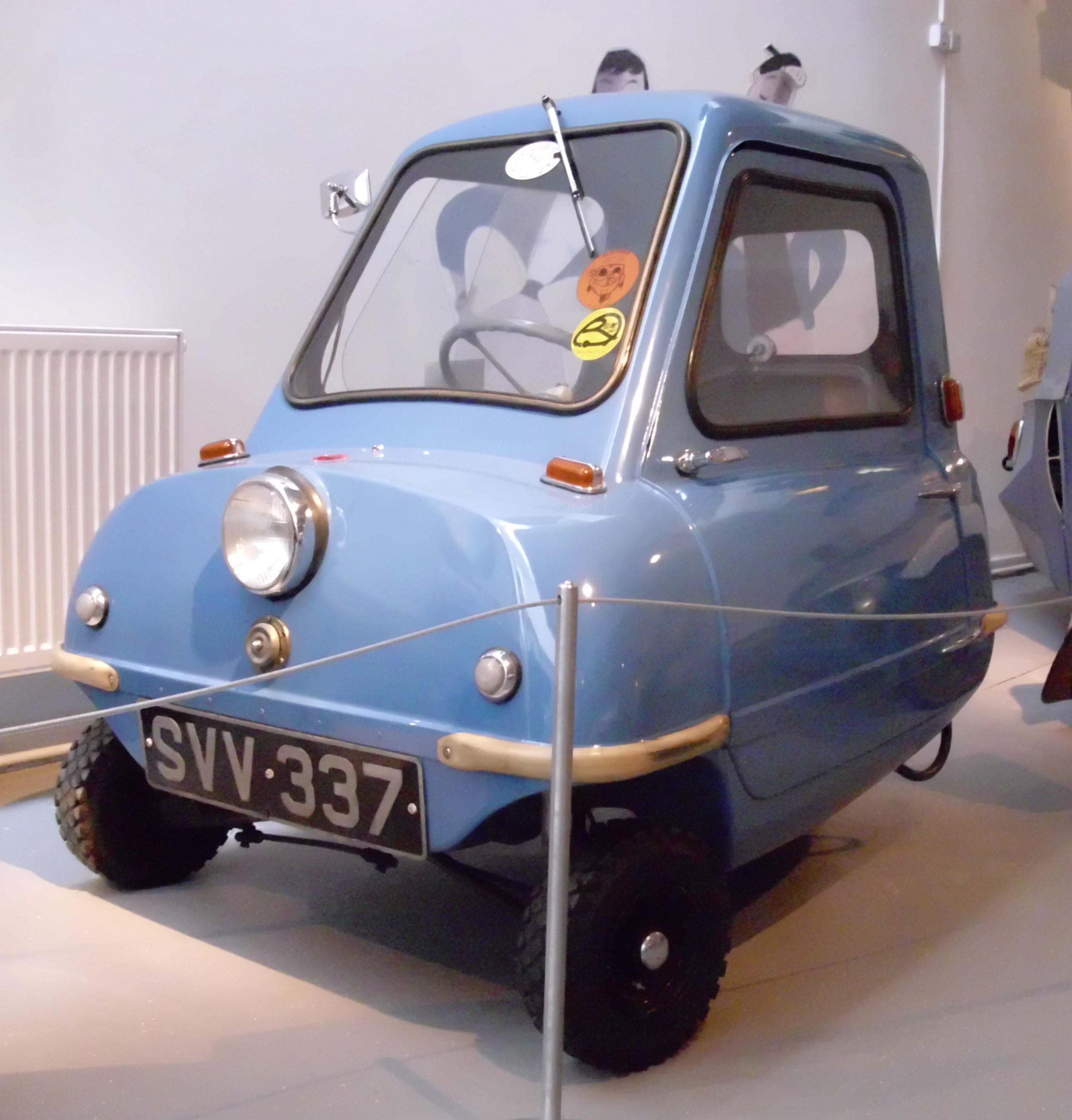
Peel P50

- Heaviest
  - Car
    - Production car – 5,100 kg (11,244 lb) – 2017 Mercedes-Maybach S600 Pullman Guard
- Lightest
  - Current production car – 440 kg (970 lb) – Caterham 7 170

== Engines ==
=== Engine displacement ===
==== Largest ====
- Production car
  - Three-cylinder – 2.0 litres (121.3 cu in) – 2020 Koenigsegg Gemera
  - Five-cylinder – 3.7 litres (222.9 cu in) – 2007 Chevrolet Colorado/GMC Canyon/Isuzu i-370
  - Six-cylinder – 4.9 litres (300 cu in) – 1996 Ford F-Series
  - Eight-cylinder – 8.2 litres (500 cu in) – 1976 Cadillac Eldorado
  - Ten-cylinder – 8.4 litres (511.5 cu in) – 2008 Dodge Viper
  - Sixteen-cylinder – 8.35 litres (509.55 cu in) – 2025 Bugatti Tourbillon

=== Power ===
==== Highest power by engine type ====
- Petrol engine (naturally aspirated) – 745.7 kW (1,014 PS; 1,000 hp) – Aston Martin Valkyrie, 6,500 cc (396.7 cu in) Cosworth V12
- Diesel engine (forced induction) – 372.85 kW (507 PS; 500 hp) – Ford Super Duty, 6,651 cc (405.9 cu in) turbocharged Powerstroke V8
- Electric motor – 1,571 kW (2,136 PS; 2,107 hp) – Rimac Nevera R
- Hybrid engine (PHEV) – 1,715 kW (2,332 PS; 2,300 hp) – Koenigsegg Gemera, V8

==== Highest power by body style ====
- 4-door sedan – 920 kW (1,251 PS; 1,234 bhp) – 2024 Lucid Air Sapphire; three electric motors
- Pickup truck/ute – 579 kW (788 PS; 777 bhp) 2024 Ram 1500 TRX; 6,166 cc (376.3 cu in) V8 petrol
- SUV – 529 kW (719 PS; 709 bhp) 2021 Dodge Durango SRT Hellcat; 6,166 cc (376.3 cu in) V8 petrol
- Van – 299 kW (407 PS; 401 bhp) 2021 Chevrolet Express and GMC Savana; 6,551 cc (399.8 cu in) V8 petrol
- MPV – 680 kW (925 PS; 912 bhp) 2026 Zeekr 009; BEV

==== Highest specific engine output (power/unit displacement) ====
- Petrol (naturally aspirated) piston engine – 124.3 kW (169.0 PS; 166.7 hp) per litre – 2008 Ariel Atom 500 373 kW (507 PS; 500 hp) 3.0 L V8
- Biofuel piston engine – 232.4 kW (316.0 PS; 311.7 hp) per litre – 2020 Koenigsegg Jesko 1,177 kW (1,600 PS; 1,578 hp) 5,065 cc (309.1 cu in) twin-turbocharged V8 on E85 fuel
- Diesel engine (naturally aspirated) – 33.4 kW (45.4 PS; 44.8 hp) per litre – 1993 Mercedes E 300 diesel 100 kW (136 PS; 134 hp) DIN 2.996 L OM606 I6
- Diesel engine (forced-induction) – 100 kW (136.0 PS; 134.1 hp) per litre – 2020 BMW Alpina D5 S 3.0 L I6 triturbo 300 kW (408 PS; 402 hp)

==== Highest power by cylinder count (production cars) ====
- Three-cylinder – 2.0 litres (121.3 cu in) – 447 kW (600 hp; 608 PS) 600 N⋅m (443 lb⋅ft) – 2020 Koenigsegg Gemera
- Five-cylinder – 2.5 litres (151.3 cu in) – 368 kW (493 hp; 500 PS) 581 N⋅m (429 lb⋅ft) – 2022 KTM X-Bow GT-XR

=== Torque ===
==== Highest torque by engine type ====
- Forced induction petrol engine – 1,818 N⋅m (1,341 lbf⋅ft) – 2020 SSC Tuatara, 5,900 cc (360.0 cu in) V8
- Naturally aspirated petrol engine – 813 N⋅m (600 lbf⋅ft) – 2013-2017 Dodge Viper, 8,390 cc (512.0 cu in) V10
- Forced induction diesel engine – 1,627 N⋅m (1,200 lb⋅ft) – 2022 (2023 MY) Ford Super Duty, 6,653 cc (406.0 cu in) V8
- Naturally aspirated diesel engine – 488 N⋅m (360 lbf⋅ft) – 1988–94 Ford F-250/350 IDI diesel, 7,276 cc (444.0 cu in) V8
- Electric motor – 2,360 N⋅m (1,741 lbf⋅ft) – 2021 Rimac Nevera
- Hybrid engine – 3,500 N⋅m (2,600 lbf⋅ft) – 2020 Koenigsegg Gemera, 3-cylinder

==== Highest torque by body style ====
- Car – 3,500 N⋅m (2,581 lbf⋅ft) – 2020 Koenigsegg Gemera, hybrid 3-cylinder + 4 electric motors,
- Pickup truck – 1,627 N⋅m (1,200 lb⋅ft) – 2022 (2023 MY) Ford Super Duty, 6,653 cc (406.0 cu in) V8
- SUV – 1,000 N⋅m (738 lbf⋅ft) – Audi Q7 V12 TDI, 6,000 cc (366.1 cu in) V12 diesel
- Van – 712 N⋅m (525 lbf⋅ft) – 2014 Chevrolet Express and GMC Savana, 6,599 cc (402.7 cu in) V8 diesel

==== Highest specific torque (torque/unit displacement) ====
The mean effective pressure (MEP) is a useful comparison tool, giving the average cylinder pressure exerted on the piston.

- Petrol engine (naturally aspirated) – MEP 1.67 MPa (16.7 bar), 132.6 N⋅m (98 lbf⋅ft) per litre – 2019 BAC Mono R 330 N⋅m (243 lbf⋅ft)
- Petrol engine (forced-induction) – MEP 3.51 MPa (35.1 bar), 279.3 N⋅m (206 lbf⋅ft) per litre – 2014 Mitsubishi Lancer Evolution X FQ440 MR 558.6 N⋅m (412 lbf⋅ft)
- Petrol engine (naturally aspirated pistonless rotary engine) – MEP 2.15 MPa (21.5 bar), 170.8 N⋅m (126.0 lbf⋅ft) per litre – 2005 Mazda RX-8 222 N⋅m (164 lbf⋅ft)
- Petrol engine (forced-induction pistonless rotary engine) – MEP 3.03 MPa (30.3 bar), 241.38 N⋅m (178.0 lbf⋅ft) per litre – Mazda RX-7 turbo 313.8 N⋅m (231 lbf⋅ft)
- Diesel engine (naturally aspirated) – MEP 903 kPa (9.03 bar), 71.88 N⋅m (53 lbf⋅ft) per litre – 1999 Nissan AD Van (Y11) 157 N⋅m (116 lbf⋅ft) 2.184 L Nissan YD
- Diesel engine (forced-induction) – MEP 3.47 MPa (34.7 bar), 276 N⋅m (204 lbf⋅ft) per litre – 2021 Mercedes-Benz C300d 550 N⋅m (406 lbf⋅ft) 1.992 L OM654 D 20 R SCR

== Fuel economy ==
=== Most economical ===
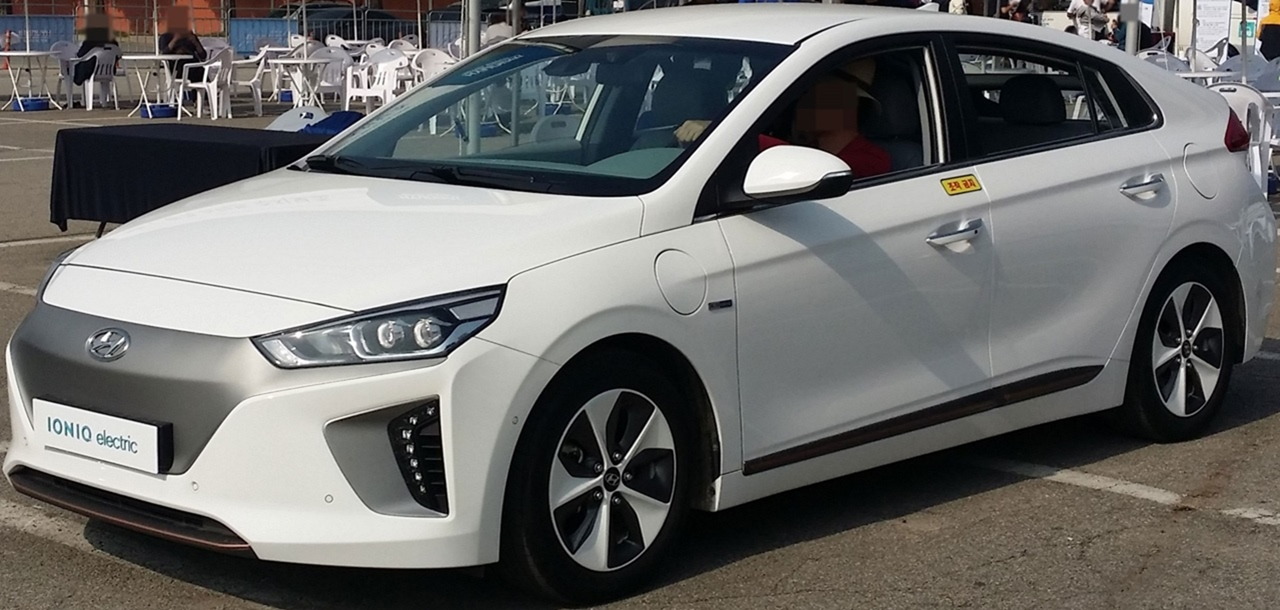
Hyundai Ioniq Electric

The following are all vehicles once certified for sale in the United States. Some vehicles from other countries have better fuel economy. Figures (showed in miles per US gallon units) are based on laboratory estimates, not consumer data.

- All-diesel production vehicle – 1984 Nissan Sentra with 41 combined / 37 city / 46 highway.
- All-petrol production vehicle – 1986 Chevrolet Sprint ER with 48 combined / 44 city / 53 highway
- All natural gas production vehicle – 2012 Honda Civic GX with 31 combined / 27 city / 38 highway
- E85 production vehicle – 2013 Ford Focus SFE FWD FFV with 22 combined / 19 city / 27 highway
- Production electric hybrid – 2021 Hyundai Ioniq Hybrid (Ioniq Blue) with 59 combined / 58 city / 60 highway
- Production plug-in electric hybrid – 2017/2023 Toyota Prius Prime with 133 combined MPGe (EV mode) and 54 MPG combined city/highway (petrol)
- Production all-electric vehicle – 2025 Lucid Air Pure RWD with 19 inch wheels with 146 combined / 149 city / 142 highway MPGe

The following are as sold in Europe:

- Volkswagen XL1, diesel-electric PHEV, 0.9 L/100 km (310 mpg_{‑imp}; 260 mpg_{‑US}) on the New European Driving Cycle

== Fuel capacity ==
All below amounts are total capacities for fuel tanks, (lithium based) batteries and other energy storage devices, not usable/net capacity.

- Diesel off-road van - Toyota Land Cruiser 70 series Troopcarrier, 180 L (40 imp gal; 48 US gal)
- Diesel SUV - Ford Excursion, 167 L (37 imp gal; 44 US gal)
- Half-ton pickup truck - Toyota Tundra, 144 L (32 imp gal; 38 US gal)
- EV - GMC Hummer EV Edition 1, 246.8 kWh
- PHEV - Leapmotor D19, 80.3 kWh, Zongheng F700, 100 L (22 imp gal; 26 US gal)
- Smallest EV - Wuling Hongguang Mini EV, 9 kWh
- Smallest PHEV - BMW i3, 9 L

== Price ==
- Most expensive (production) – US$3,260,000 – Bugatti Chiron Sport
- Least expensive (production) – US$125 (equivalent to $2,404 in 2025) official general inflation – 1922 Briggs & Stratton Flyer
- Most expensive (auction) – US$143,000,000 1957 Uhlenhaut Coupé
- Most expensive (private sale) – US$70,000,000 (£52,000,000 at June 2018 exchange rates) 1963 Ferrari 250 GTO (2018)
- Most expensive (concept car) – US$8,000,000 2005 Maybach Exelero

== Performance ==
=== Acceleration ===
- Quickest 0 to 97 km/h (0 to 60 mph) with 1 foot rollout – 1.74 seconds – Rimac Nevera
- Quickest 0 to 100 km/h (0 to 62 mph) with 1 foot rollout – 1.81 seconds – Rimac Nevera
- Quickest 0 to 161 km/h (0 to 100 mph) with 1 foot rollout – 3.21 seconds – Rimac Nevera
- Quickest 0 to 200 km/h (0 to 124 mph) with 1 foot rollout – 4.42 seconds – Rimac Nevera
- Quickest 0 to 300 km/h (0 to 186 mph) with 1 foot rollout – 9.22 seconds – Rimac Nevera
- Quickest 0 to 400 km/h (0 to 249 mph) with 1 foot rollout – 20.68 seconds – Koenigsegg Regera (with non-standard Michelin Pilot Sport Cup 2 R tyres)

=== Top speed ===
- Highest top speed (forced induction petrol engine) – Bugatti Chiron Super Sport 300+ – 490.48 km/h (304.77 mph)
- Highest top speed (naturally aspirated engine) – McLaren F1 – 355–386 km/h (221–240 mph)
- Highest top speed (forced induction diesel engine) – Porsche Panamera 4S Diesel – 288 km/h (179 mph)
- Highest top speed (electric production vehicle) – Yangwang U9 – 496.21 km/h (308.33 mph)
- Highest top speed (unibody SUV) – Lamborghini Urus SE – 312 km/h (194 mph)
- Highest top speed (production half-ton pickup truck) – Dodge Ram SRT-10 – 248.784 km/h (154.587 mph)

=== Highest rpm redline ===
- Internal combustion piston-engined production car – Gordon Murray T.50 – 12,100 rpm
- Internal combustion Wankel rotary-engined production car – Mazda RX-8 – 9,000 rpm
- Electric production vehicle – Zeekr 001 FR – 20,620 rpm

== Sales ==
Best-selling models

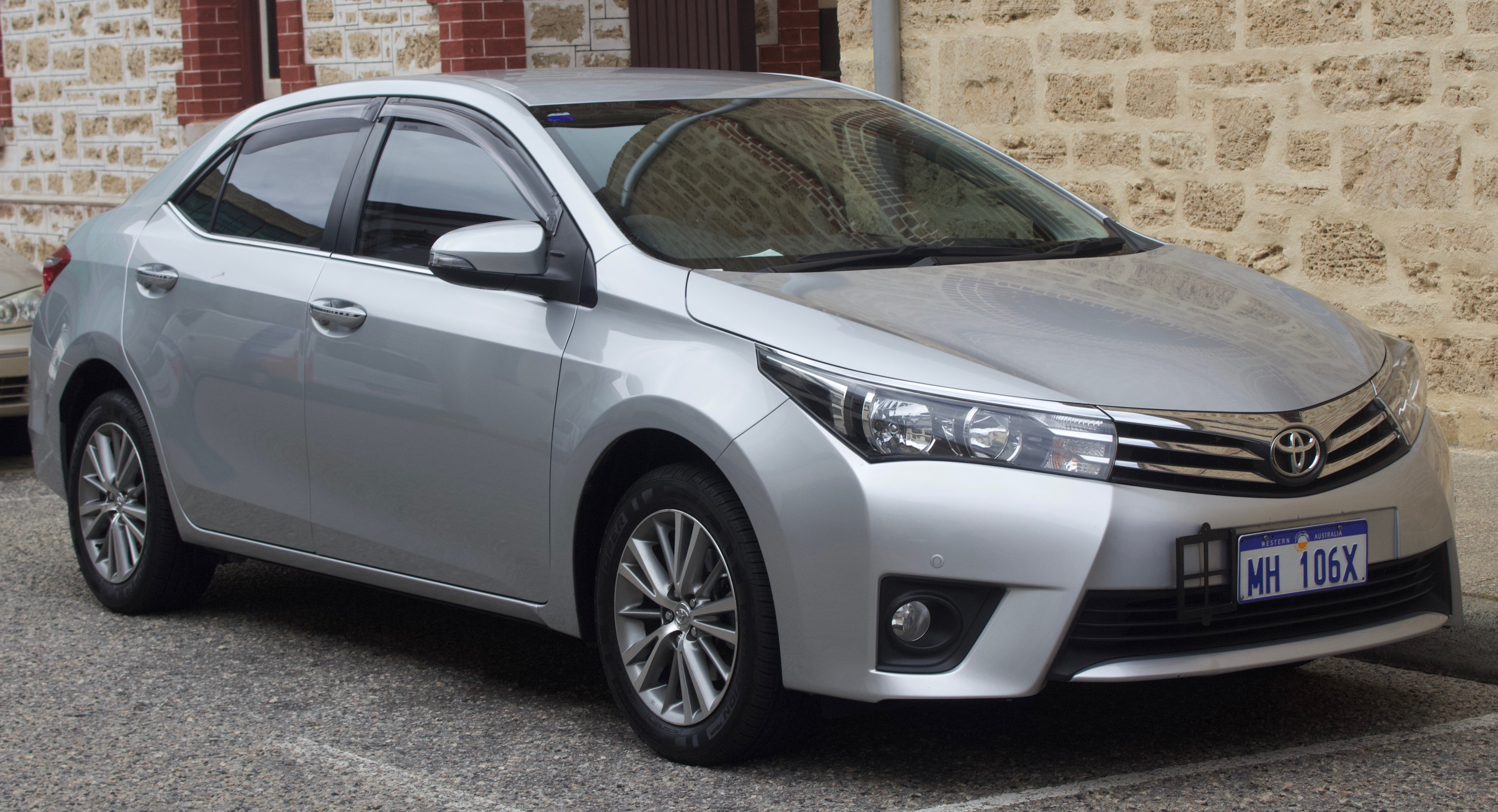
Toyota Corolla

- Best-selling vehicle nameplate – Toyota Corolla (50,000,000+ units sold since 1966)
- Best-selling single model – Volkswagen Beetle (21,529,464 units sold between 1938 and 2003)
- Best single-year sales – 1.36 million – 2005 Toyota Corolla
- Best single-month sales – 126,905 – July 2005 Ford F-Series

== See also ==
- List of largest machines (including land vehicles)
