= Camless piston engine =

Engine type that controls valves without using conventional cams

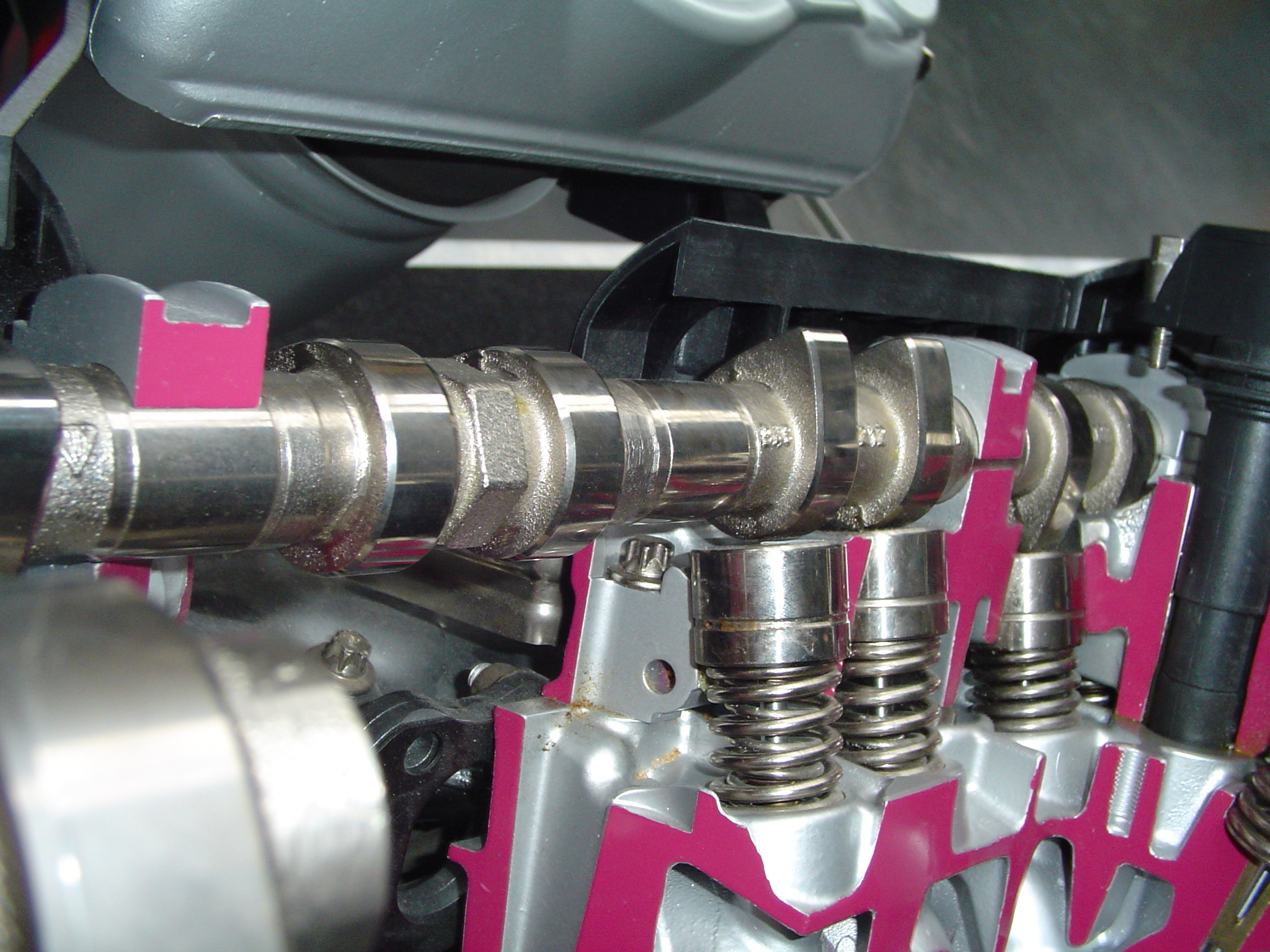
A camshaft and valve springs (Saxon Industrial Museum Chemnitz)

A camless or free-valve piston engine is an engine that has poppet valves operated by means of electromagnetic, hydraulic, or pneumatic actuators instead of conventional cams. Actuators can be used to both open and close valves, or to open valves closed by springs or other means.

Camshafts normally have one lobe per valve, with a fixed valve duration and lift. Although many modern engines use camshaft phasing, adjusting the lift and valve duration in a working engine is more difficult. Some manufacturers use systems with more than one cam lobe, but this is still a compromise as only a few profiles can be in operation at once. This is not the case with the camless engine, where lift and valve timing can be adjusted freely from valve to valve and from cycle to cycle. It also allows multiple lift events per cycle and, indeed, no events per cycle—switching off the cylinder entirely.

== Camless development ==
Camless valve trains have long been investigated by several companies, including Renault, BMW, Fiat, Valeo, General Motors, Ricardo, Lotus Engineering who developed electro-hydraulic valve actuation in the late 1980s as a spinoff of their active suspension program (both utilised similar electro-hydraulic actuation and control), Ford, Jiangsu Gongda Power Technologies, and FreeValve. Some of these systems are commercially available, although not yet in engines in production road vehicles. In the Spring of 2015, Christian von Koenigsegg told reporters that the technology pursued by his company is "getting ready for fruition", but said nothing specific about his company's timetable.

Christian von Koenigsegg also claims that the PHEA camless technology allows the elimination of the pre-catalytic converter, because the standard catalytic converter can be brought up to temperature quickly by manipulating the exhaust cycle.

== Camless engines in marine and power stations ==
=== Advantages ===
Because camless engines have no camshaft, they may have fewer moving parts. In these systems, the camshaft follower, rocker arms, and/or pushrods have been replaced by an electro-hydraulic actuator system which uses the existing oil pumps, thus reducing development risks of the new system by employing existing technology. Direction changing on older B&W MC engines was engaged by physically changing the direction of the cam roller, whereas with the new camless engine, it is controlled by a computer. This eliminates the risk of mechanical failures that could damage the engine if there was a malfunction while changing directions. Additionally, because there is no chain connection between the crankshaft and the camshaft, the engine is lighter with fewer points of failure. The absence of a camshaft also means that the parasitic load on the engine is lower, which is particularly useful in large marine engines, as it can equate to a large amount of power savings. With a camless engine, fuel injection and exhaust timing are directly controlled by an engine control unit and can be constantly changed and adjusted without stopping the engine. This allows for the engine to run at a lower RPM, a feature useful in ships as it allows better low speed maneuvering while docking. Additionally, when a ship is maneuvering, the computer controlled fuel injection and valve timing allows for faster RPM control, hence faster stopping in emergency situations.

Solenoid valves are used to control valve activation that is electronically operated. These are used for controlling liquid or gas flow and are most commonly used in fluidics as control elements. They are multifunctional in a way to release, shut off, mix, or distribute fluids with high reliability and fast processing. The market for solenoid valves is growing with the imperative growth in all the regions. Increasing application areas year on year and advancement in technology and developed fluid automation technologies, all are driving the market on a global scale.

=== Technical limitations ===
Conventional mechanical camshaft actuation is capable of generating extremely high forces which, combined with very high stiffness/low mechanical compliance of a conventional modern valve train layout, are used to very accurately and consistently control the position the engine valves. This enables very high levels of valve acceleration and lift and also very small valve-to-valve and valve-to-piston clearances to be used in combination with very high engine speeds. For example, prior to the FIA restrictions, Formula 1 engines ran at speeds of over 20,000 RPM and power outputs of over 330 bhp/L (250 kW/L) normally aspirated using a conventional camshaft and mechanical valve actuation; it is extremely unlikely that this high engine speed and output can be achieved with camless valve actuation. At 20,000 RPM, the valves open and close 166 times per second.

=== Emissions ===
Camless engines are able to produce fewer emissions than their equivalent camshaft counterparts because they are able to more precisely control the combustion procedure, allowing for more complete combustion of all hydrocarbons. The computer is able to sense when not all of the fuel is being consumed and immediately relax valve timings to supply less fuel to a cylinder. The ECU can constantly adjust valve timing, height, and fuel/air mixtures to optimize efficiency for a given RPM/torque load. It can sense when there is a high amount of NOx and SOx emission and change the timing to make the exhaust gas hotter or cooler. Since the engine is run electronically and not mechanically, camless engines can be updated to meet new emission regulations without mechanical modifications.

=== Fuel injection ===
Camless engines can further reduce NOx emissions with the use of fuel staging. Instead of simply injecting a constant stream of fuel, fuel staging injects the fuel at the optimal time for the most complete combustion. Fuel injection can shut off when there is sufficient pressure and add more fuel when there is less pressure, allowing the engines to run closer to a perfect diesel cycle. This allows the engine to run as efficiently as the environment and heat capacity of the metal will allow.

=== Long-term effects ===
Because these new engines can diagnose themselves and run efficiently without an operator changing settings, these engines require a smaller crew to maintain them at sea. This crew reduction equates to cheaper shipping and more global trade.

== Camless engines in cars ==
The British company Camcon Technology is developing a camless engine for passenger vehicles based on their proprietary Intelligent Valve Actuation (IVA) system. Camcon has collaborated with Jaguar Land Rover to fit IVA onto an Ingenium 2.0-litre 4-cylinder petrol engine, and they jointly published results at the 2017 Aachen Colloquium. Camcon also discussed features and benefits in an article and video that was published in Autocar magazine.

In April 2016, the Chinese car manufacturer Qoros presented a concept car incorporating Freevalve technology.

In March 2020, Koenigsegg Automotive AB announced its first four-seater car, the Gemera, which was set to be powered by a sequentially turbocharged 2.0-liter inline-three engine in conjunction with three electric motors. Two of those electric motors, each of which makes 600 bhp (450 kW), are on the rear wheels. The third motor is attached to the engine crankshaft and makes 400 bhp (300 kW). Working with the motor to propel the front wheels is what Koenigsegg calls the Tiny Friendly Giant (TFG) engine. It is rated at 600 bhp and uses the camless Freevalve technology. However, as of July of 2024, all customer cars are set to use a twin turbocharged 5.0-liter V8.

== See also ==
- Helical camshaft
- Multiair
- EREV
