= Koenigsegg TFG =

Inline-3 engine

TFG
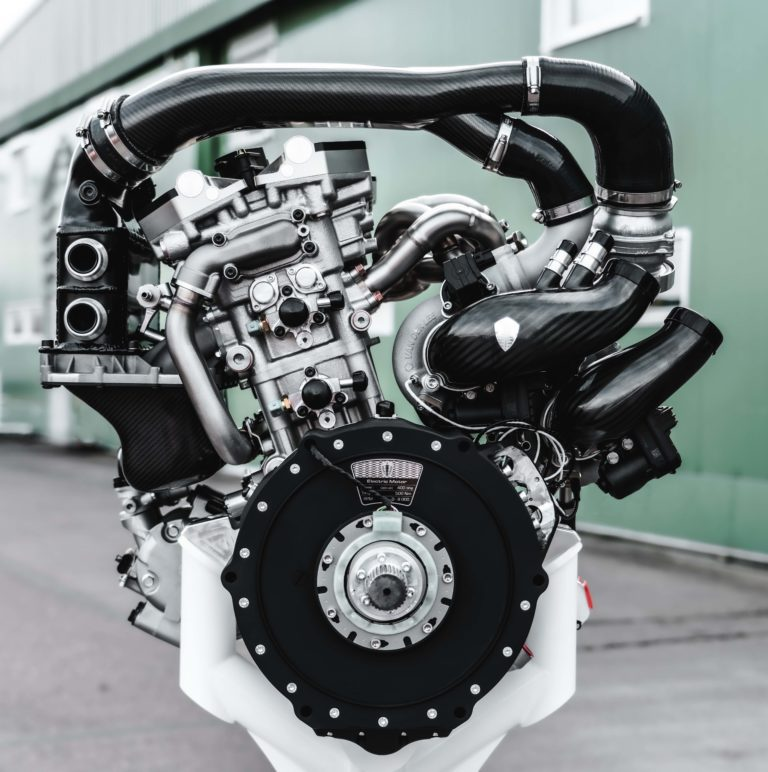

Overview
- Manufacturer: Koenigsegg
- Also called: Tiny Friendly Giant

Layout
- Configuration: Inline-3
- Displacement: 2.0 L (1,988 cc)
- Cylinder bore: 95 mm (3.7 in)
- Piston stroke: 93.5 mm (3.68 in)
- Cylinder block material: Magnesium alloy
- Cylinder head material: Magnesium alloy
- Valvetrain: Camless
- Compression ratio: 9.5:1

RPM range
- Max. engine speed: 8500 rpm

Combustion
- Fuel system: E85
- Fuel type: Gasoline, E85, E100, Methanol
- Oil system: Dry sump

Output
- Power output: 600 hp (447 kW; 608 PS) at 7500 rpm
- Torque output: 600 N⋅m (443 ft⋅lbf) at 2000 rpm; 400 N⋅m (295 ft⋅lbf) at 1700 rpm

Dimensions
- Dry weight: 70 kg (154.3 lb)

The Koenigsegg TFG ("Tiny Friendly Giant") is an inline-3 engine. It is a Freevalve (camless piston engine), thus it does not have a camshaft. Instead it uses electro-hydraulic-pneumatic actuators that allow it to open each valve (both intake and exhaust) independently to maximise performance and minimise fuel consumption depending on driving conditions. The actuators also have the ability to switch the engine between 2- and 4-stroke cycles by controlling the number of power strokes in relation to the number of idle strokes. The patent for this system was bought by Koenigsegg's sister company Cargine Engineering in 2002. The variable displacement system allows fuel economy to be 15%-20% higher than a variable camshaft engine. Cold start emissions are also drastically reduced by 60% over a variable camshaft engine. The engine is equipped with the same turbo for each set of exhaust valves developed by van der lee Turbo Systems, So this is a switchable parallel system where at low exhaust mass flow the boost is created by one turbo and the second turbo being switched by at higher mass flow amounts, thus improving transient response. Without the turbos, Koenigsegg claims the engine is only capable of 300 hp (220 kW). The engine can operate on the Otto cycle, Miller cycle, or the Atkinson cycle. Further advantages of the camless engine is that a throttle body is no longer required because of the precision of the valve timing. According to Koenigsegg CEO Christian von Koenigsegg, when running on Gen 2.0 ethanol, the TFG becomes "at least as CO_{2}-neutral as an EV running on renewable electric sources such as solar or wind." The TFG follows previous Koenigsegg engines in its ability to run on all major fuels, from E100 to standard gas.

The TFG was originally intended to power the Koenigsegg Gemera, but in July 2024, Christian von Koenigsegg stated that due to the orders for the Gemera being predominantly for the V8 version, the TFG version has been cancelled.
