= Camcon binary actuator =

Electromagnetic actuation device

The Camcon binary actuator is an electronically controlled electromagnetic actuation device that physically moves in between 2 stable states. Unlike a solenoid the binary actuator technology (BAT) only uses energy when switching in between states. It does not require a constant current running through it.

== Design and operation ==
The binary actuator consists of an electromagnet that polarizes a rod resting in between 2 magnetic poles that are situated by one end of the rod. The charge on the rod then experiences attraction to one pole or another, causing the end of the rod to attach to one of the two poles of the magnetic circuit. When one end of the rod moves to one magnetic pole, the rod pivots on its midpoint and the other end of the rod moves in the opposite direction. This movement can be used to control a valve sealing or opening a passage.

This design is bistable, meaning it will remain in either position until prompted to adopt its other stable state via the process as described above. The end of the rod will always remain in contact with one pole or the other, even when there is no current flowing through the system. Part of the force of attraction is stored in springs while the rod remains in either position to aid in accelerating the rod towards its other position when the magnetic flux is reversed. This conserves energy whenever the magnetic field switches, in turn using less energy to switch into either position. This makes the binary actuator energy efficient

== Forces involved ==
The following formula can be used to compute forces and moments:

Fp= Φ2 P/4

Where Fp [ N] = pressure force, Φ [mm] is orifice diameter, and P[ bar] is the pressure difference at inlet

Δ F= Fh-Fp

Where Fh [ N] is the holding force and Fp [ N] is the pressure force

Fs= Fh/cos a

Where Fs [ N] is the spring force, Fh [ N] is the holding force, and a [deg] =Spring declination angle

Fr= Fh tan(a)

Where Fr [ N] is the rotating force, Fh [ N] is holding force and a [deg] .= Spring declination angle

Ms=Fr (r-K)cos c

Where Ms [Nm] is reversing momentum that is caused by spring force, Fr [ N] is the rotating force, K [mm] = the spring fitting offset, and c [deg] is the pivoting force projection angle

Mp=Δ F Φ/2

Where Mp [Nm]-reversing momentum caused by pressure and Φ [mm] is the orifice diameter

Mr=Ms+Mp

Where Mr [Nm] = effective reversing momentum, Ms [Nm] is reversing momentum that is caused by spring force, and Mp [Nm]-reversing momentum caused by pressure and Φ [mm] is the orifice diameter

Mh=Fm L

Where Mh [Nm] is the holding momentum, Fm [N]=magnetic force, and L [mm] is the Swing bar’s effective length

And In order to maintain the valve in a closed state Fh must be greater than Fp.

== History ==
The Camcon binary actuator was developed by Wladyslaw Wygnanski. The developmental principle of BAT was an internal energy recycling concept which was first applied to generate a fast responding pneumatic horn valve with high energy efficiency for an air powered sound source loudspeaker. Subsequently, Wygnanski developed a series of inventions in the patent class, “permanent or constantly energized magnet actuator”. By the late 1990s, he made a conscious decision to refocus the development of BAT and joined with Camcon in further development of the technology.

== Application of Camcon binary actuation ==
While the technology was originally proposed for use in reducing noise in the aircraft industry, or to control liquid nitrogen flow in spacecraft from NASA, Camcon took the technology of the binary actuator as a means to control flow of fluid and gases in oil and gas industries, automotive industries, and more recently in healthcare.

=== Oil and gas industries ===
Control of Gas Lift Technique(way of moving oil to surface by pumping gas bubbles into drill lines) electronically and efficiently rather than manual machine intervention.

=== Automotive industries ===
Used in anti-locking brake systems for trucks, parking brakes, and digitally driven engine valves.

A series of patents assigned to Camcon such as the 2005 patent for "Electromagnetic fluid flow control valve" using the binary actuator technology have been used in the automotive industry.

=== Health care ===
Recently Camcom have used BAT in the health care industry to provide a precise and accurate method of delivery of oxygen to a patient. It would be used to shut off or regulate oxygen flow using a series of valves. Additional areas where Camcon has disclosed BAT may be applied in healthcare include implantable devices within the human body, mechanical aids, such as prosthetics and blood circulation support and accurate laboratory dispensing equipment, which can also be applied to drug dosing and delivery.

== Alternate applications of binary actuation ==
Another application is in robotics. The design of these systems, while they still use the same principle (having 2 home states), are vastly different and are unrelated to the Camcon binary actuation technology. Binary robotics devices are capable of executing practical tasks, such as instrument placement for planetary exploration. Robotics are envisioned to use Binary actuators as they are smaller and less complex than conventional servos and better suited, for example, for legged locomotion through rough terrain. One such extension of the binary actuator is the dielectric Elastomer actuation (DEA). The DEA is an application of binary actuation described by Jean-Sebastien Plante and Steven Dubowsky. One of their applications uses the binary principle of flipping between the two stable states, but using a diamond shaped frame instead of a rocking rod. Elastic bands store energy similar to the springs of the BAT design.

Another application of the principles used by BAT is in articulated binary elements (ABEs), One such design consists of bi-stable mechanisms sandwiched by flexible beams. The actuators can be mounted surrounding a joint in a similar fashion to the muscles in the human elbow or knee. Experimental prototype binary devices and elements have been designed and constructed. The Binary Robotic Articulated Intelligent Device (BRAID) and a design of a six legged walking robot capable of walking in rough terrain are examples.

== Patents ==
- Sound pressure active transformer, (1983).
- Electromagnetic actuators, (1989).
- Improved electro-magnetically operable device, (2004).
- Improved actuator requiring low power for actuation for remotely located valve operation and valve actuator combination, (2007).
- Electromagnetic fluid flow control valve, (2007).
- Rotary electromagnetic actuator, (2017).

== See also ==
Articulated robot

Kinetic energy recovery system
