= Koenigsegg =

Swedish manufacturer of high-performance sports cars

Koenigsegg Automotive AB
- Type: Aktiebolag
- Industry: Automotive
- Founded: 1994; 32 years ago
- Founder: Christian von Koenigsegg
- Headquarters: Ängelholm, Scania, Sweden
- Area served: Worldwide
- Key people: Christian von Koenigsegg (CEO); Halldora von Koenigsegg(COO)
- Products: Sports cars; Engineering consultations
- Owner: Christian von Koenigsegg (majority); Chieftain Capital Management (minority); 65 Equity Partners (minority)
- Website: koenigsegg.com

Koenigsegg Automotive AB (Swedish: [ˈkø̌ːnɪɡsɛɡ]) is a Swedish manufacturer of high-performance sports cars based in Ängelholm, Skåne County. Founded in 1994 by Christian von Koenigsegg, the company is noted for its high degree of vertical integration, developing core systems—such as engines, transmissions, and software—entirely in-house.

The manufacturer has set several world records for production car performance, most notably with the CCR and the Agera RS, the latter of which achieved a two-way average top speed of 447 km/h (277.8 mph) in 2017. Koenigsegg is a pioneer in automotive technology, introducing innovations such as the Freevalve camless engine, and the Light Speed Transmission (LST).

As of 2026, Koenigsegg's production includes the Jesko hypercar, the four-seat Gemera, and the CC850. The company operates from a major production and R&D complex at a former Swedish Air Force base and employs approximately 850 staff.

== Company ==
The company was founded in 1994 in Sweden by Christian von Koenigsegg, with the intention of producing a "world-class" sports car. Many years of development and testing led to the CC8S, the company's first street-legal production car, which was introduced in 2002.

In 2006, Koenigsegg began production of the CCX, which uses an engine created in-house specifically for the car. The goal was to develop a car homologated for use worldwide, particularly the United States whose strict regulations did not allow the import of earlier Koenigsegg models.

In March 2009, the CCXR was listed by Forbes as one of "the world's most beautiful cars".

In December 2010, the Agera won the BBC Top Gear Hypercar of the Year Award.

Apart from developing, manufacturing and selling the Koenigsegg line of sports cars, Koenigsegg is also involved in "green technology" development programmes beginning with the CCXR ("Flower Power") flex-fuel sports car and continuing through the present with the Jesko. Koenigsegg is also active in development programs of plug-in electric cars' systems and next-generation reciprocating engine technologies. Koenigsegg has also developed a camless piston engine which found its first application in the Gemera, which was introduced in 2020.

Koenigsegg develops and produces most of the main systems, subsystems and components needed for its cars in-house instead of relying on subcontractors.

In January 2019, Koenigsegg sold a 20% stake in the company to Swedish electric car manufacturer (Egstrand & Lundgren), National Electric Vehicle Sweden (NEVS), for US$171 million.

Koenigsegg has since then bought the stake back from NEVS in 2021 and owns 100% of the company again.

In mid-2023, Koenigsegg inaugurated a new factory, engineering and R&D facilities and a showroom in Ängelholm. At the end of 2023, Koenigsegg had just under 800 employees.

== History ==
=== Factory history ===
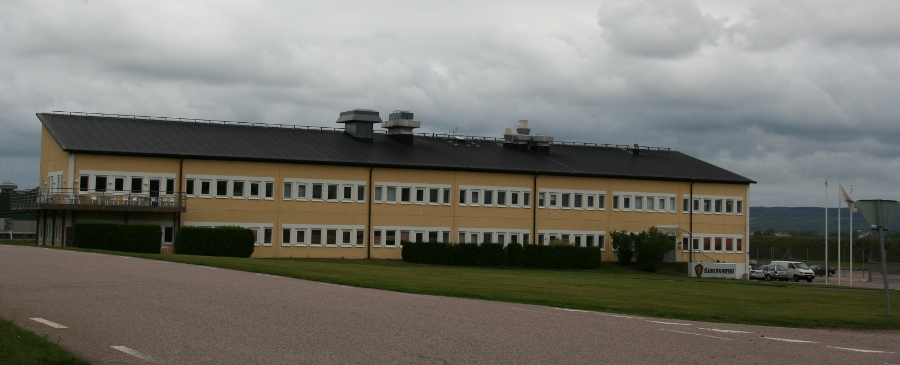
The old factory building in Ängelholm, Sweden

Christian von Koenigsegg got the idea to build his own car after watching the Norwegian stop-motion animated movie The Pinchcliffe Grand Prix in his youth. At 22 years old, Koenigsegg gathered kr 60,000,000 from investors and founded Koenigsegg Automotive in 1994.

Initially, Koenigsegg Automotive was based in Olofström. In the early 2000s, the company moved to Ängelholm. On 22 February 2003, one of the production facilities caught fire and was badly damaged. Koenigsegg then acquired an abandoned air field to use as his new factory building and in late 2003, one of the two large fighter-jet hangars and an office building were converted into a car factory. Since then, the company is located near the still-active Ängelholm airport. Koenigsegg controls and uses the former military runway for shakedown runs of production cars and high-speed testing.

In July 2023 Koenigsegg opened a newly built factory, close to the old factory building in Ängeholm, doubling the production capacity.

=== Prototypes and production ===
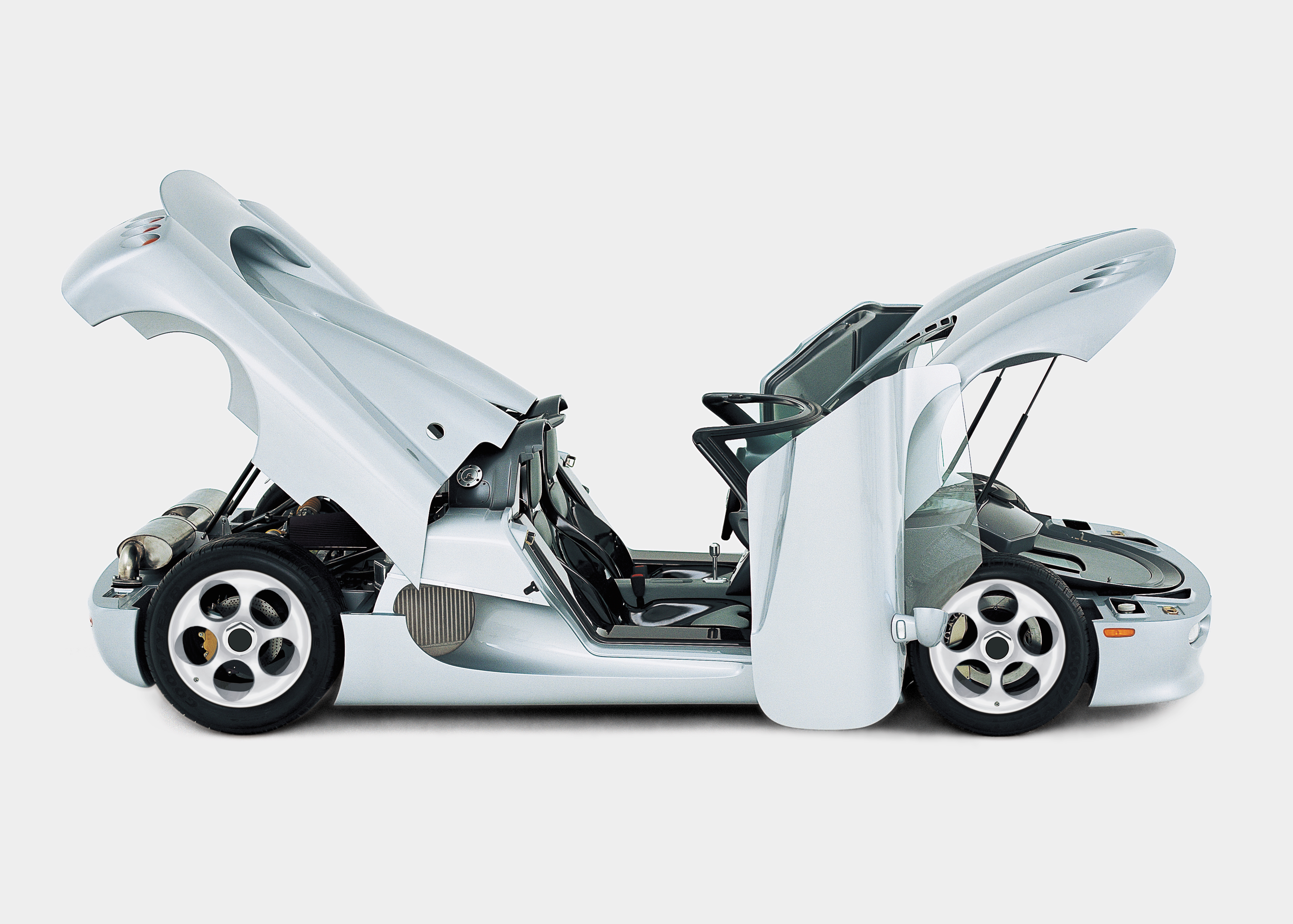
The Koenigsegg CC prototype which became the basis for the company's future models

The initial design of the CC was penned down by Christian von Koenigsegg. Industrial designer David Crafoord realised the sketches as a 1:5 scale model. This model was later scaled up in order to create the base plug for the initial Koenigsegg prototype that was finished in 1996. During the next years, the prototype went through extensive testing and several new prototypes were built. The prototypes initially used an Audi V8 engine but after the engine supply contract fell through, the next candidate was the Flat-12 race engine developed by Motori Moderni for the Scuderia Coloni Formula one team, in which this engine was raced under the Subaru badge in the 1990 season. These Subaru 1235 engines were purchased and modified for use in the CC; this deal failed when the founder of Motori Moderni died, sending the company into bankruptcy.

Koenigsegg developed its own engine based on the Ford Modular architecture in 2012. It later developed its own engines from scratch, including control systems and transmissions, which is very unusual for a small size sports car producer.

=== Badge ===
The Koenigsegg badge was designed in 1994 by Jacob Låftman, based on the heraldic coat of arms of the von Koenigsegg family. The shield has been the family's coat of arms since the 12th century when a family member was knighted by the Holy Roman Empire.

=== Ghost Badge ===
After moving into the abandoned airfield, which once housed a Swedish Air Force squadron, Koenigsegg adopted the "ghost symbol" that the squadron had on its planes as a tribute. The badge is seen on models built in the factory that was converted from its hangar.

=== Attempted purchase of Saab ===
On 12 June 2009, the media reported that Koenigsegg Group, consisting of Koenigsegg Automotive AB, Christian von Koenigsegg, Bård Eker and a group of investors led by Mark Bishop had signed a letter of intent with Saab to take over the brand from General Motors. General Motors confirmed on 16 June that they had chosen Koenigsegg Group as the buyer of Saab Automobile. The deal, set to close 30 September 2009, included US$600 million in financing from the European Investment Bank, guaranteed by the Swedish government. By comparison, in 2008 Koenigsegg with its staff of 45 produced 18 cars at an average price of US$1 million each; Saab employed 3,400 workers and made more than 93,000 cars.

General Motors announced on 18 August that the deal had been signed, although certain financing details remained to be completed. On 9 September 2009, Koenigsegg announced that BAIC was going to join as a minority stakeholder in Koenigsegg.

In November 2009, Koenigsegg decided not to finalise the purchase of Saab and therefore left the negotiations. Koenigsegg stated that its decision was due to the uncertain timing of finalisation of the takeover.

== Models ==
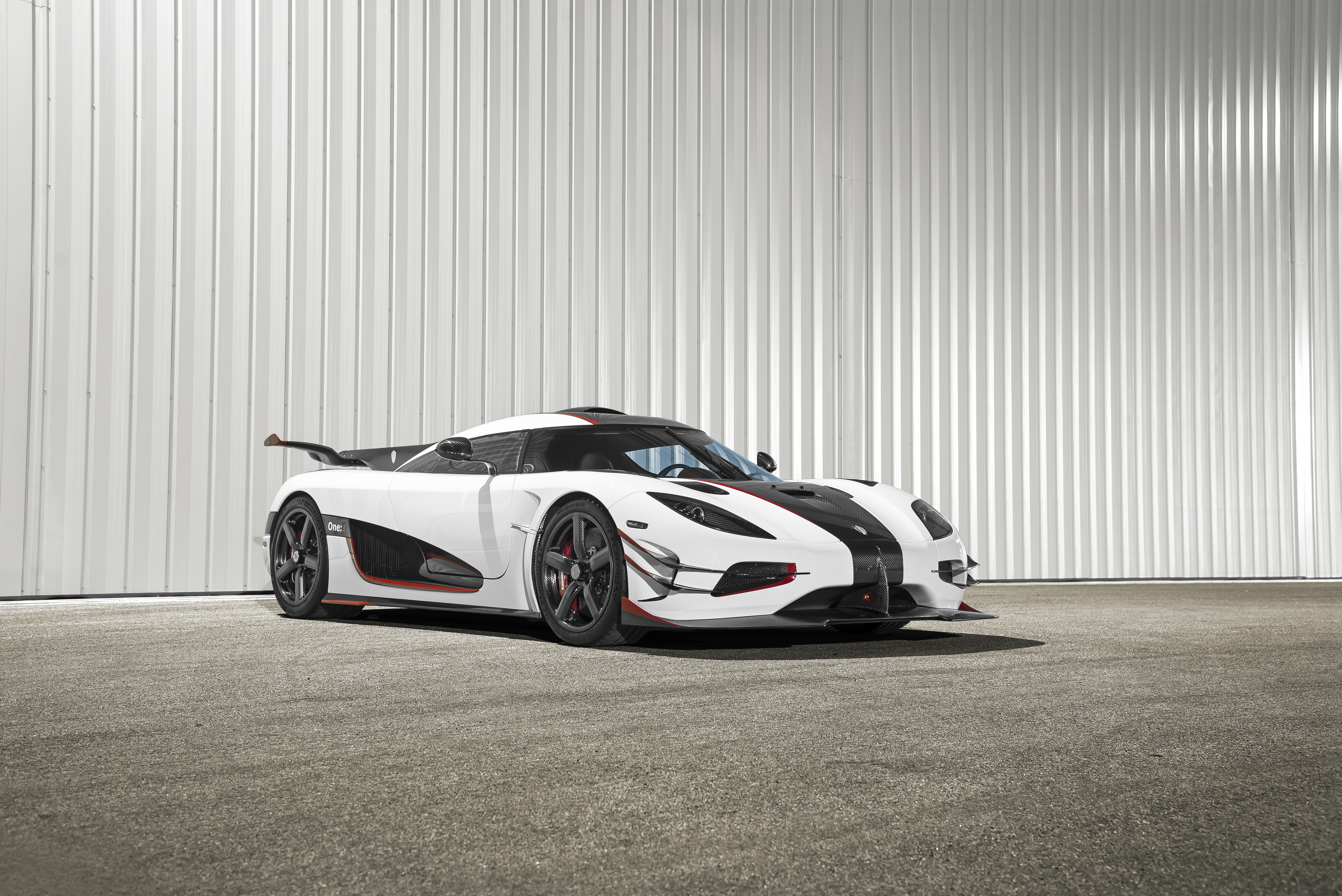
Koenigsegg One:1 (US spec)

A Koenigsegg CC prototype was first publicised in 1996, while the full carbon fibre production prototype having white paintwork was finally unveiled at the 2000 Paris Motor Show. Stephan Reeckmann became the first customer of the brand, placing a deposit in 2001. Another customer took delivery of a red CC8S in 2002 at the Geneva Auto Show and four more cars were built that year. Koenigsegg was established in Asia later that year with a premiere at the Seoul Auto Show. In 2004, the new CCR, which was basically a high performance variant of the CC8S, was unveiled at the Geneva Auto Show; only 14 were produced.

In 2006, Koenigsegg introduced the CCX, a new model, that was developed in order to meet worldwide regulations for road use. This meant the car had to go through extensive development in order to meet the latest and most stringent safety and emission standards that the world's authorities demanded; Koenigsegg had to, for example, develop its own engines and other related technologies.

In 2007, Koenigsegg premiered the CCXR, a biofuel/flex-fuel version of the CCX. The car features a modified engine, fuel system, and engine management system that enables the car to run on normal gasoline or ethanol, and in any mixture between these two fuels. Ethanol has a higher octane rating compared to regular fuel.

In 2009, Koenigsegg released information about a special edition car called the Trevita, of which three were planned to be made but only two were finished due to technical problems. The Trevita, which translates into English as "three whites", has a body made entirely of Koenigsegg's proprietary material consisting of diamond-coated carbon fibre. The Trevita is based on the CCXR, and therefore has a power output of 759 kW; 1,032 PS; 1,018 hp when running on biofuel.

Sound of Koenigsegg Agera
The Koenigsegg Agera at Goodwood Festival of Speed 2010

In 2010 Koenigsegg released information at the 2010 Geneva Motor Show about a new model called the Agera, which translates into English as "take action/act". The Agera features a Koenigsegg developed 5.0-litre V8 engine coupled with variable turbo geometry turbochargers having a power output of 716 kW; 973 PS; 960 hp, mated to a newly developed 7-speed dual-clutch transmission. The Agera's design follows a clear lineage from the previous Koenigsegg sports cars, but adds many special new features, such as a wider front track, new styling and aerodynamic features, and a new interior; including a new lighting technique called "Ghost Light" by the manufacturer which consists of microscopic holes to hide the interior lighting until it is turned on, which then shines through what appears to be solid aluminium. Production of the Agera ended in July 2018 after being in production for eight years when two of the three final edition cars were presented to its customers.

At the 2015 Geneva Motor Show, Koenigsegg presented a new model named the Regera, which translates into English as to "reign" or "rule". The Regera uses the Koenigsegg Direct Drive (KDD) transmission. Below 48 km/h (30 mph), motive power is by two electric motors on the rear wheels and the internal combustion engine (ICE) is disconnected. Above 48 km/h (30 mph), the ICE is connected by a fixed ratio transmission with no gearbox, torque vectoring by the previously mentioned electric motors and boosted by a third electric motor attached to the driveshaft.

Koenigsegg initially based its engine on a V8 engine block from Ford Racing. These engines powered the initial run of the CC monikered cars. The block for the 4.8 L (4,800 cc) V8 in the CCX (Competition Coupe Ten, to celebrate ten years of the company) was cast for Koenigsegg by Grainger & Worrall of the UK who also cast the block for the Agera's 5.0-litre engine.

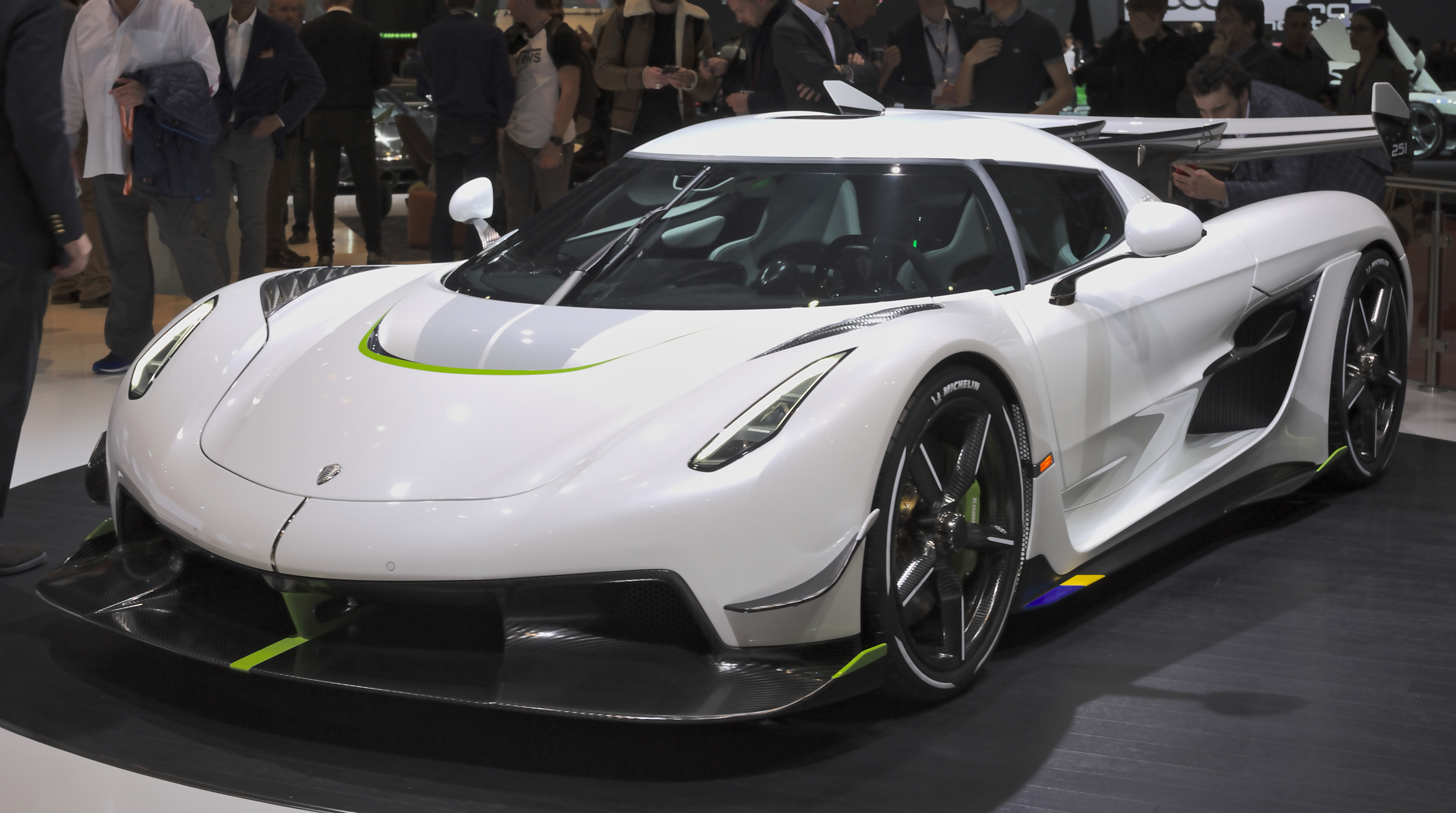
Koenigsegg Jesko

In late 2018, Koenigsegg showed potential customers in Australia the replacement of the Agera via VR. Teaser sketches were released by the company at the same time. Initially, the model was rumoured to be called "Ragnarok" but the public unveil of the car at the 2019 Geneva Motor Show revealed the name to be Jesko, after the founder's father Jesko von Koenigsegg.

The Jesko uses a development of the 5.0-litre V8 engine used in the Agera which has a power output of 955 kW; 1,298 PS; 1,281 hp on normal gasoline and has a power output of 1,195 kW; 1,625 PS; 1,603 hp and 1,500 N⋅m (1,106 lb⋅ft) of torque at 5,100 rpm on E85 biofuel. The engine is mated to a 9-speed multi-clutch transmission having seven clutches called the "Light Speed Transmission" (LST) by the manufacturer. The focus of this transmission is to have faster shift times. The car will come in either a high-downforce, track-oriented or a low-drag, high speed Absolut variant.

On 3 March 2020, the Gemera was unveiled on an online broadcast. It was unveiled to the public in 2022. There will be a limited production of 300 units. This will be Koenigsegg's first four-seater vehicle. The vehicle is powered by a small engine called the Koenigsegg TFG (Tiny Friendly Giant). The car also features full-length Koenigsegg Automated Twisted Synchrohelix Actuation Doors (KATSAD).

The production version of the Gemera was unveiled on 11 July 2023 featuring a nine-speed automatic gearbox used from the Jesko instead of the Regera's Koenigsegg Direct Drive (KDD) system and side mirrors.

=== List of models ===
Model	Year	Units	0–100 km/h (0–62 mph)	Top Speed	Notes and References
CC	1994	1			Prototype.
CC8S	2002–2003	6	3.5 sec	390 km/h (240 mph)	2 right hand drive.
CCR	2004–2006	14	3.2 sec	395 km/h (245 mph) (claimed), 387.866 km/h (241.009 mph) (tested)	
CCX	2006–2010	29	3.2 sec	395 km/h (245 mph) (claimed)	
CCGT	2007	1			Developed for the sole purpose of competing in the FIA GT1.
CCXR	2007–2009	9	3.1 sec	401 km/h (249 mph) (claimed)	
CCX Edition	2008	2	3.0 sec	401 km/h (249 mph) (claimed)	
CCXR Edition	2008	4	2.9 sec	401 km/h (249 mph) (claimed)	
CCXR Special Edition	2008–2009	2	2.9 sec	401 km/h (249 mph) (claimed)	
Trevita	2008–2009	2	2.9 sec	410 km/h (250 mph) (claimed)	
Quant	2009				Solar Concept
Agera	2010	7	3.0 sec	420 km/h (260 mph) (claimed)	2 later became Agera R.
Agera R	2011–2014	18	2.8 sec, 0–200 km/h (0–124 mph) 7.8 sec	420 km/h (260 mph) (claimed)	2 converted from Agera.
Agera S	2013–2014	5	2.9 sec, 0–200 km/h (0–124 mph) 7.9 sec	420 km/h (260 mph) (claimed)	
One:1	2014–2015	7	0–400 km/h (0–249 mph) 20 sec	440 km/h (270 mph) (claimed)	6 + 1 prototype
Agera RS	2015–2018	27		457.94 km/h (284.55 mph) (tested)	Overproduction by 2, there were just 25 units originally planned. 3 Agera RSR for Japanese market and 2 Agera XS included.
Agera Final	2016–2018	3			
Regera	2016–2022	80	2.8 sec	410 km/h (250 mph) (claimed)	
Jesko	2021–	125		500 km/h (310 mph) (reported)	Units planned, buyers have the option to choose between the track-oriented Jesko Attack or the speed-focused Jesko Absolut.
Gemera	2024–	300	1.9 sec		Units planned. $1.9 million.
CC850	2024–	70			Units planned, was originally 50. Inspired by the Koenigsegg CC8S design, and commemorating Christian von Koenigsegg's 50th birthday and 20 years since the delivery of their first production vehicle (Koenigsegg CC8S).
Chimera	2024	1			Unit developed for Mohammed Ben Sulayem. The Chimera has a Jesko engine and utilizes a seven-speed dual-clutch (semi-automatic) transmission. – based on the Koenigsegg Agera RS design.
Sadair's Spear	2025	30			More refined version of Jesko Attack. Broke the record on Gotland Ring during shakedown laps.
CCGT1	2026	70			Tribute to the Koenigsegg CCGT GT1 race project.
Total Units		813			

== Technology ==
=== Freevalve Technology ===
Koenigsegg's camless valve actuation, branded as FreeValve, replaces the traditional camshaft with electro-hydraulic-pneumatic actuators. This allows intake and exhaust valve to be controlled independently. This results in an increase in torque, fuel efficiency, and emissions control, while enabling 2-stroke or 4-stroke operation.

=== Light Speed Transmission (LST) ===
The Koenigsegg's Light Speed Transmission (LST) is a 9-speed, 7-clutch gearbox for the Koenigsegg Jesko. It is capable of shifting between gears at quick speeds. It removes standard synchronizers for 2ms shifts, making it over 50% shorter and lighter (90 kg) than usual dual-clutch units.

=== Koenigsegg Direct Drive (KDD) ===
The Koenigsegg Direct Drive (KDD) is a patent-pending hybrid powertrain system developed by Koenigsegg for the Regera. It eliminates the typical multi-speed transmission in favour of a single-gear, direct-drive mechanism to reduce mechanical weight and energy parasitic losses.

The KDD system connects the internal combustion engine to the rear axle. To manage power delivery across the vehicle's speed range without a gearbox, the system uses combination of electric propulsion and an hydraulic coupling known as HydraCoup. At speeds below 30 mph (48 km/h), "clutch-slip” is possible, which enables the engine to gain revolutions without stalling the vehicle. Above this speed, the coupling locks to establish a 1:1 link between the engine and the 2.73:1 final drive ratio.

Three YASA axial-flux electric motors are used: a 160 kW (215 hp) motor mounted to the crankshaft and two 180 kW (241 hp) motors mounted on the rear driveshafts. The crankshaft motor functions as a starter at low RPMs, and as a generator. The rear motors functions as primary propulsion from a standstill and allow for dynamic torque vectoring.

According to manufacturer data, the removal of a traditional gearbox reduces energy loss by 50% during high-speed cruising. The KDD system, including the motors and the 800V, 4.5 kWh battery pack, adds 88 kg (194 lb) to the vehicle's curb weight, which the manufacturer states is offset by the removal of a standard dual-clutch transmission. The system produces a combined output of over 1,500 hp (1,100 kW) and 2,000 N⋅m (1,500 lb⋅ft) of torque, allowing the Regera to reach its top speed of 400 km/h (250 mph) without gear shifts. While the car lacks traditional gears, steering-wheel-mounted paddles are used to manually trigger HydraCoup slip (simulating a "downshift") or adjust the intensity of regenerative braking.

== Records ==
On 28 February 2005, at 12:08 pm local time, in Nardò, Italy, the CCR broke the Guinness World Record for the fastest production car in the world, having attained 387.866 km/h (241.009 mph) on the Nardò Ring (a circular track of 7.8 mi (12.6 km) circumference), breaking the record previously held by the McLaren F1. It held the record until September 2005 when the Bugatti Veyron broke the record again by attaining a speed of 408.47 km/h (253.81 mph), proven both by Car and Driver and Top Gear. Both of the records set by Bugatti and McLaren were set on Volkswagen's own test-track Ehra-Lessien, which features a 5.6 miles (9.0 km) straight.

In 2008 the German magazine sport auto conducted a 0–300–0 km/h (0–186–0 mph) test for production cars, with the CCX winning the event in a total time of 29.2 seconds. The CCX also accelerated from 0–200 km/h in 9.3 seconds.

In September 2011, the Agera R broke the Guinness World Record for 0–300 km/h with a time of 14.53 seconds and a 0–300–0 km/h time of 21.19 seconds. Koenigsegg improved this record with the One:1 on 8 June 2015. It attained 0–300 km/h in 11.92 seconds and 0–300–0 km/h in 17.95 seconds (a 3.24 sec improvement over the 2011 Koenigsegg Agera R record), it also attained 0–322 km/h (0–200 mph) in 14.328 seconds and 0–322–0 km/h in 20.71 seconds.

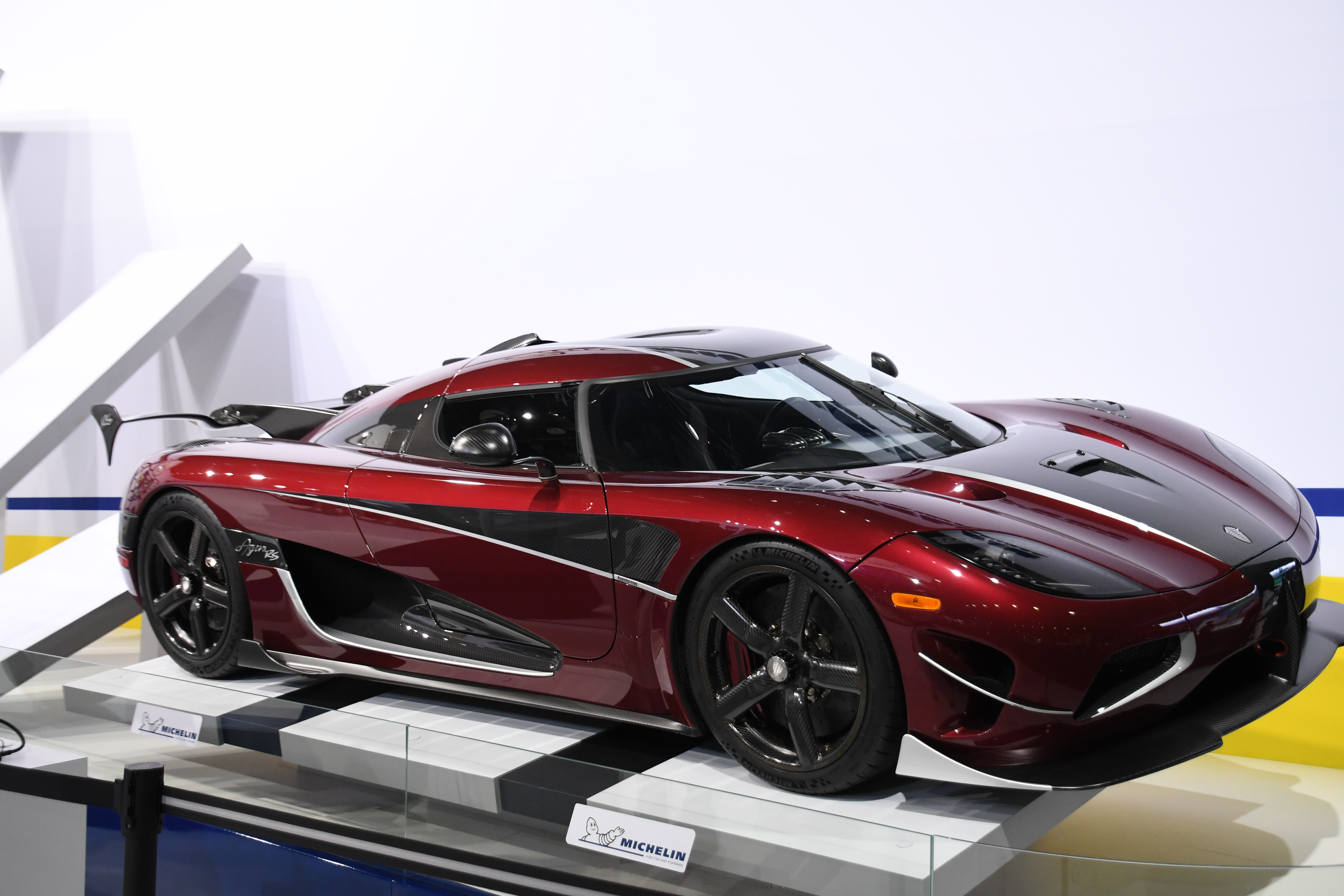
The Agera RS World Record Car on display at the 2018 North American International Auto Show

On 1 October 2017, an Agera RS set an unofficial record for 0–400–0 km/h (0–249–0 mph) with a time of 36.44 seconds. The record was set at the Vandel Airfield in Denmark and broke the record of 42 seconds set by the Bugatti Chiron a few weeks prior.

On 4 November 2017, an Agera RS set a new record for the world's fastest production car with an average speed of 447.19 km/h (277.87 mph) with Koenigsegg test driver Niklas Lilja behind the wheel. The record breaking run was done on a closed 11 mi (18 km) section of Nevada State Route 160 in Pahrump, Nevada, United States. On the same day they also beat its own 0–400–0 km/h record they set a few weeks prior (33.29 seconds compared to the old record of 36.44 seconds). It was later confirmed via the instrumentation that the car topped out at 457.94 km/h (284.55 mph).

On 23 September 2019, Koenigsegg set a new 0–400–0 km/h world record when a Koenigsegg Regera completed the run in 31.49 seconds. This was 1.8 seconds faster than Koenigsegg's previously unbeaten record, set by the Agera RS in 2017.

On 16 June 2023, the Regera again broke the 0–400–0 km/h acceleration record with an improved time of 28.81 seconds. The new record attempt came one month after the Regera's first record was broken by the Rimac Nevera, which achieved a time of 29.93 seconds. The record was set at Örebro Airport by Koenigsegg development driver Markus Lundh, who cited improvements in the track surface and the new Michelin Cup 2 R tyres as reasons for the faster run.

Over the new record run, the car accelerated from 0–400 km/h in 20.68 seconds over a distance of 1,483 m (4,865.5 ft) and decelerated to a controlled stop in 8.13 seconds over a distance of 422 m (1,384.5 ft). The total distance used for the record was 1,905 m (6,250.0 ft).

On 18 August 2024, the Jesko Attack set the production car lap record at Laguna Seca with a time of 1:24.86, even though neither Koenigsegg test driver Markus Lundh nor the Jesko had ever been on that track before.

On 7 August 2025, the Jesko Absolut reclaimed the 0–400–0 km/h world record with a time of 25.21 seconds, surpassing the 25.79-second mark set the previous month by the Rimac Nevera R.

== Awards ==
- Top Gear – Award 2022 – The Jesko becomes BBC Top Gear Hypercar of the Year
- Top Gear – Award 2010 – The Agera becomes BBC Top Gear Hypercar of the Year
- Red Dot – Award for excellent Design
- National Swedish Design Prize – Utmärkt Svensk Form
- Entrepreneur of the Year Nomination – Företagarna Sweden
- Powercar – Superexotic import of the year 2007 and 2008 – Germany
- Top Gear Innovation of the Year 2023 – For the [ESS (Engaged Shift System)] manual/automatic shift system in the [CC850].
- 2023 FIA President Innovation Medal: Christian von Koenigsegg.
