= Camcon Technology =

- Company type: Private
- Founded: 2009; 17 years ago
- Headquarters: Cambridge, UK
- Services: Intelligent Valve Technology
- Website: camcon-automotive.com

Camcon Technology (also Camcon Auto) is a Cambridge-based company focused on the core research and development of the Camcon Binary Actuator, a new class of digital valve technology. It develops high-speed and low-energy control of liquid and gas used in the healthcare industry.

== About Camcon ==
Camcon is based in the UK's Silicon Fen and was founded by Wladyslaw Wygnanski in 2000 as a vehicle to support the development and commercialisation of a new class of binary actuating technology. The Intellectual Property company aims to make the Camcon Binary Actuator a worldwide standard and 32 worldwide patents have already been granted.

The company is developing products based on the Camcon Binary Actuator in a number of industrial markets, including oil & gas, medical, automotive and aviation, where its unique characteristics are deemed to offer the largest financial and technological return.

Camcon is funded by Hit & Run Music Publishing, the management team behind the Genesis (band) and ACUS Managing Partners, an active management venture capitalist that specialises in funding early-stage technology companies.

In 2008, Lord Young of Graffham took on the role of chairman and invested the capital that the company required to complete its current development programme and see the introduction of Camcon products into the market.
