= Electro-hydraulic actuator =

Actuator operated electrically

Electro-hydraulic actuators (EHAs), replace hydraulic systems with self-contained actuators operated solely by electrical power. EHAs eliminate the need for separate hydraulic pumps and tubing, because they include their own pump, simplifying system architectures and improving safety and reliability. This technology originally was developed for the aerospace industry but has since expanded into many other industries where hydraulic power is commonly used.

== Conventional designs ==
Aircraft were originally controlled by small aerodynamic surfaces operated by cables, attached to levers that magnified the pilot's input, using mechanical advantage. As aircraft grew in size and performance, the aerodynamic forces on these surfaces grew to the point where it was no longer possible for the pilot to manually control them across a wide range of speeds - controls with enough advantage to control the aircraft at high speed left the aircraft with significant overcontrol at lower speeds when the aerodynamic forces were reduced. Numerous aircraft in the early stages of World War II suffered from these problems, notably the Mitsubishi Zero and P-38 Lightning.

Starting in the 1940s, hydraulics were introduced to address these problems. In their early incarnations, hydraulic pumps attached to the engines fed high-pressure oil through tubes to the various control surfaces. Here, small valves were attached to the original control cables, controlling the flow of oil into an associated actuator connected to the control surface. One of the earliest fittings of a hydraulic boost system was to ailerons on late-war models of the P-38L, removing the need for great human strength to achieve a higher rate of roll.

The systems evolved, replacing the mechanical linkages to the valves with electrical controls, producing the "fly-by-wire" design, and more recently, optical networking systems called "fly-by-light". All these systems require three separate components, the hydraulic supply system, the valves and associated control network, and the actuators. Since any one of these systems could fail and render the aircraft inoperable, redundancies are needed that greatly increase the complexity of the system. Additionally, keeping the hydraulic oil pressurized is a constant power drain.

Some of the earliest use was on the Avro Vulcan bomber and the Vickers VC10 airliner known as the Powered Flight Control Units.

== EHAs ==
The primary development that led to the possibility of EHAs was the precision feedback controlled conventional motor, or high-power stepper motor. Stepper motors are designed to move through a fixed angle with every pulse of current and do so repeatedly in an extremely precise fashion. Both types of motor drives have been in use for years, powering the controls on motion control rigs and numeric control machine tools for instance.

With an EHA, high-power versions of these motors are used to drive a reversible pump, which is tied to a hydraulic cylinder. The pump pressurizes a working fluid, typically hydraulic oil, directly raising the pressure in the cylinder, and causing it to move. The entire system, consisting of the pump, the cylinder and a reservoir of hydraulic fluid, is packaged into a single self-contained unit.

Instead of the energy needed to move the controls being supplied by an external hydraulic supply, it is supplied over normal electrical wiring, albeit larger wiring than what would be found in a fly-by-wire system. The speed of the motion is controlled through the use of pulse-code modulation. The result is a "power-by-wire" system, where both the control and energy are sent through a single set of wires.

Redundancy can thus be provided by using two such units per surface, and two sets of electrical wires. This is far simpler than the corresponding systems using an external hydraulic supply. Additionally, the EHA has the advantage that it only draws power when it is being moved, the pressure is maintained internally when the motor stops. This can reduce power use on the aircraft by eliminating the constant draw of the hydraulic pumps. EHAs also reduce weight, allow better streamlining due to reduced internal routing of piping, and lower overall weight of the control system.
