= Koenigsegg Gemera =

Swedish plug-in hybrid sports car

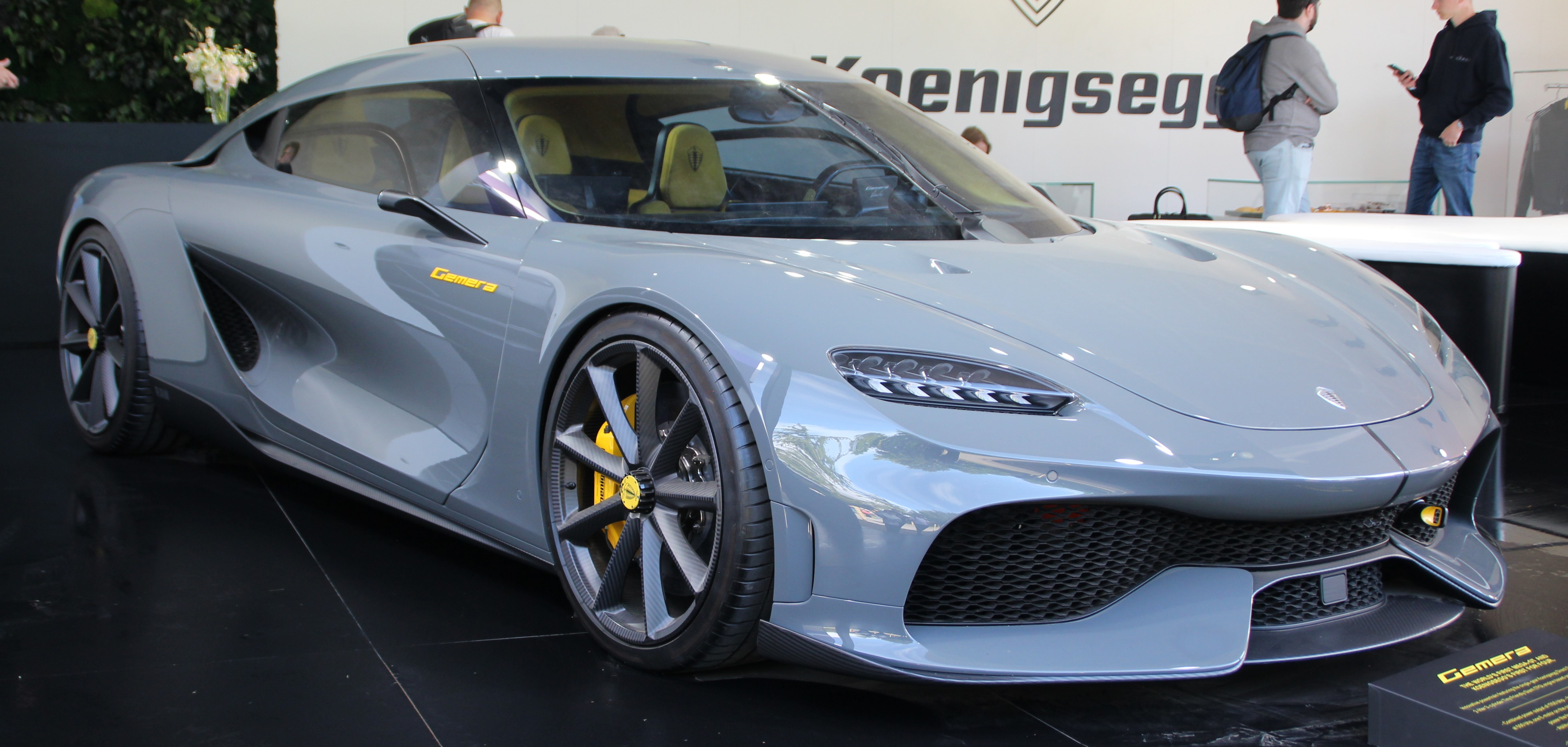
- Koenigsegg Gemera at the 2022 Goodwood Festival of Speed

Overview
- Manufacturer: Koenigsegg
- Production: 2026–present
- Assembly: Sweden: Ängelholm
- Designer: Christian von Koenigsegg; Sasha Selipanov

Body and chassis
- Class: Grand tourer (S)
- Body style: 2-door, 4-seat coupé
- Layout: Longitudinal, rear mid-engine, all-wheel-drive
- Doors: 2 Dihedral Synchro-Helix

Powertrain
- Engine: Prototype: 2.0 L TFG twin-turbocharged I3; Production: 5.0 L twin-turbocharged V8
- Electric motor: 1 Dark Matter electric motor placed on front axle
- Power output: I3 engine + electric motor: 1,044 kW (1,400 hp; 1,419 PS) (combined); HV8 engine + electric motor: 1,715 kW (2,300 hp; 2,332 PS) (combined)
- Transmission: 9-speed Koenigsegg LSTT multi-clutch
- Hybrid drivetrain: PHEV
- Battery: 850V 14 kWh
- Range: 1,463 km (909 miles)
- Electric range: 50 km (31 mi)

Dimensions
- Wheelbase: 3,000 mm (118.1 in)
- Length: 4,975 mm (195.9 in)
- Width: 1,988 mm (78.3 in)
- Height: 1,295 mm (51.0 in)
- Kerb weight: 1,988 kg (4,383 lb) (2020 prototype); 2,042 kg (4,502 lb) (2023 production)

The Koenigsegg Gemera is a limited production four-seat plug-in hybrid grand tourer (or 2-door sports saloon) manufactured by the Swedish automobile manufacturer Koenigsegg. It was unveiled on 3 March 2020 at an online broadcast by Koenigsegg at the cancelled Geneva Motor Show. A production model was unveiled on 11 July 2023. The name is a combination of the Swedish words ge and mera, which translate to "give more".

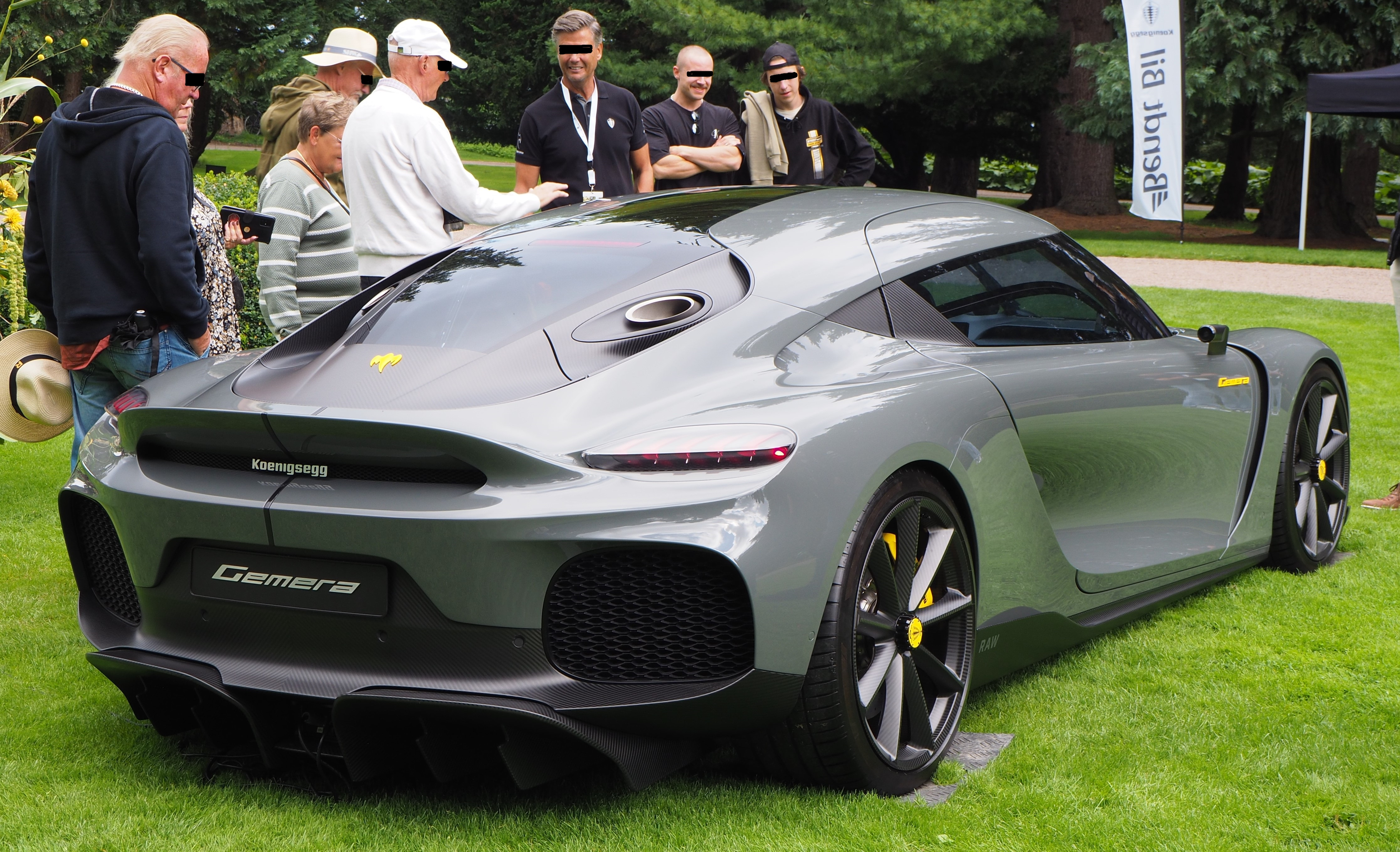
Koenigsegg Gemera rear

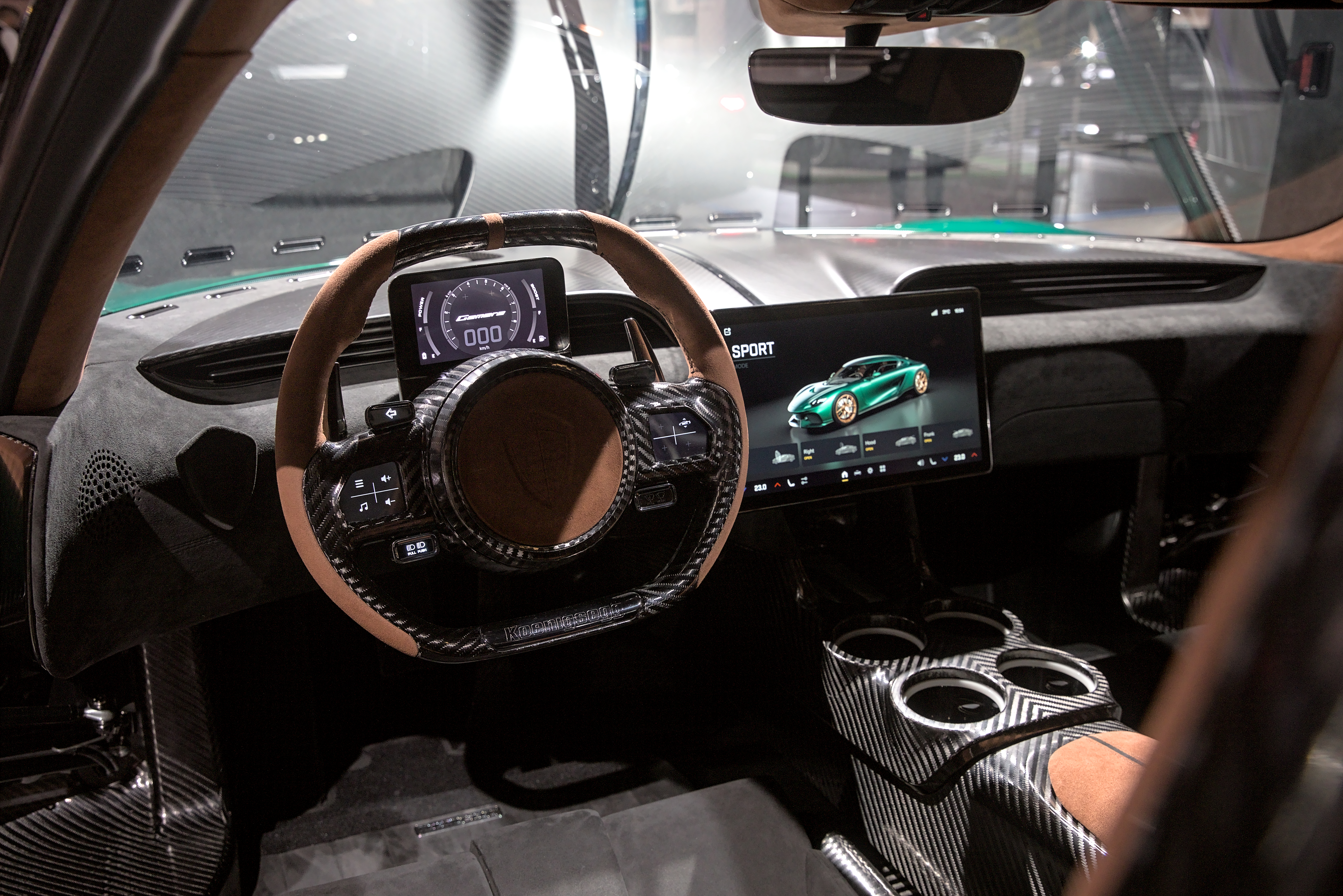
Interior

== Specifications ==
The Gemera is the company's first four-seater car.

=== Powertrain ===
The hybrid powertrain uses an updated hot-V variant of the 5.0-litre twin-turbo HV8 from the Jesko. The HV8 powertrain has a combined power output of 1,715 kW (2,300 hp; 2,330 PS) and 2,750 N⋅m (2,028 lb⋅ft) of torque when the engine runs on E85 fuel. The HV8 engine is mated to a 9-speed Light Speed Tourbillon Transmission (LSTT), a modified version of the 9-speed Light Speed Transmission found in the Jesko.

Initially, Koenigsegg planned to offer an option of a hybrid powertrain using their twin-turbocharged TFG 2.0-litre inline-3, which would have been mated to a direct drive (single-speed transmission). However, in July, 2024, Christian Von Koenigsegg said that the inline-3 powertrain option would not be offered in the Gemera due to a lack of demand from customers. Notably, this engine features Koenigsegg's Freevalve technology, which means it doesn't use a camshaft. The engine produced 600 bhp (447 kW; 608 PS) at 7,500 rpm and 600 N⋅m (443 lb⋅ft) from 2,000-7,000 rpm, with a redline of 8,500 rpm. Combined with the three electric motors, this powertrain produced a combined 1,400 hp (1,044 kW; 1,419 PS).

==== Electric motors ====
Three electric motors are included, one for each rear wheel with 373 kW (507 PS; 500 hp) and 1000 Nm each and the Dark Matter motor on the front axle with 600 kW (800 hp) and 1250 Nm.

The Dark Matter motor is 380 mm (15.1 in) in diameter and 390 mm (15.3 in) thick, for a total weight of 39 kilograms (86 lb). It uses a "raxial flux" design; an axial flux design complemented by a smaller radial flux component to flatten the torque response curve and reduce torque ripple. It uses carbon fiber to minimize weight for the rotor, stator, and housing. It is a six-phase motor instead of the conventional three-phase design.

It comes with an 850V 14 kWh battery pack.

=== Wheels, brakes and tyres ===
The Gemera features standard forged aluminium centre lock wheels, with a size of 21" x 10.5" up front and 22" x 11.5" at the back. However, optional Aircore carbon fibre wheels are available.

The standard tyres are Michelin Pilot Sport 4S, while the car can be had with Michelin Cup 2R (still street legal), with both coming in a 295/30 ZR21 size for the front axle and in a 315/30 ZR22 size for the rear axle.

The front brakes use 410 mm (16.1 inches) ventilated ceramic rotors with 6-piston calipers, while the rear brakes feature 395 mm (15.6 inches) ventilated ceramic discs with 4-piston calipers, while the car features electric brake boosting.

=== Other features ===
The Gemera is Koenigsegg's first all-wheel-drive model and has all-wheel steering and torque vectoring. In line with other Koenigsegg models, the chassis has a carbon fibre monocoque with aluminium sub-structures. The car features electronically adjustable ride height and a titanium exhaust system manufactured by Akrapovič.

Two notable design features of the Gemera are its lack of a B-pillar and two large dihedral synchro-helix actuation doors, which open forward to allow easier access to the leather upholstered four-seater cabin. Interior features include eight cup-holders (four heated and four cooled), driver assistance systems, four touchscreens (two 13-inch central touchscreens along with two additional screens for the side and rear view cameras), infotainment system for the front and rear passengers, front and rear wireless phone chargers, Apple CarPlay, Wi-Fi connection, a three-zone climate system, electrically adjustable seats with memory foam padding, and an audio system with 11 speakers. Koenigsegg announced that production will be limited to 300 cars.

In addition, the presentation introduced the optional Ghost package for the Gemera, consisting of an extended front splitter, S-duct, rear wing and other aerodynamic features.

In 2022, Koenigsegg announced plans to expand its operations with the construction of a new factory in which the Gemera will be built. The new addition will contain a production & assembly line, a customer lounge, offices, spaces for events, as well as additional warehousing and pre-production spaces. When complete, the Koenigsegg factory will total over 30,000 m^{2} (320,000 sq ft).

In July 11, 2023 Koenigsegg unviled the production Gemera, which features the Jesko's nine-speed automatic gearbox instead of the Regera's Koenigsegg Direct Drive system, and side mirrors.

=== Performance ===
The Gemera's I3 version has a claimed top speed of 400 km/h (249 mph), accelerating from 0 to 100 km/h (62 mph) in 1.9 seconds, with a top speed of 300 km/h (186 mph) in electric mode.

== See also ==
- List of production cars by power output
