= Rimac Nevera =

Battery electric sports car

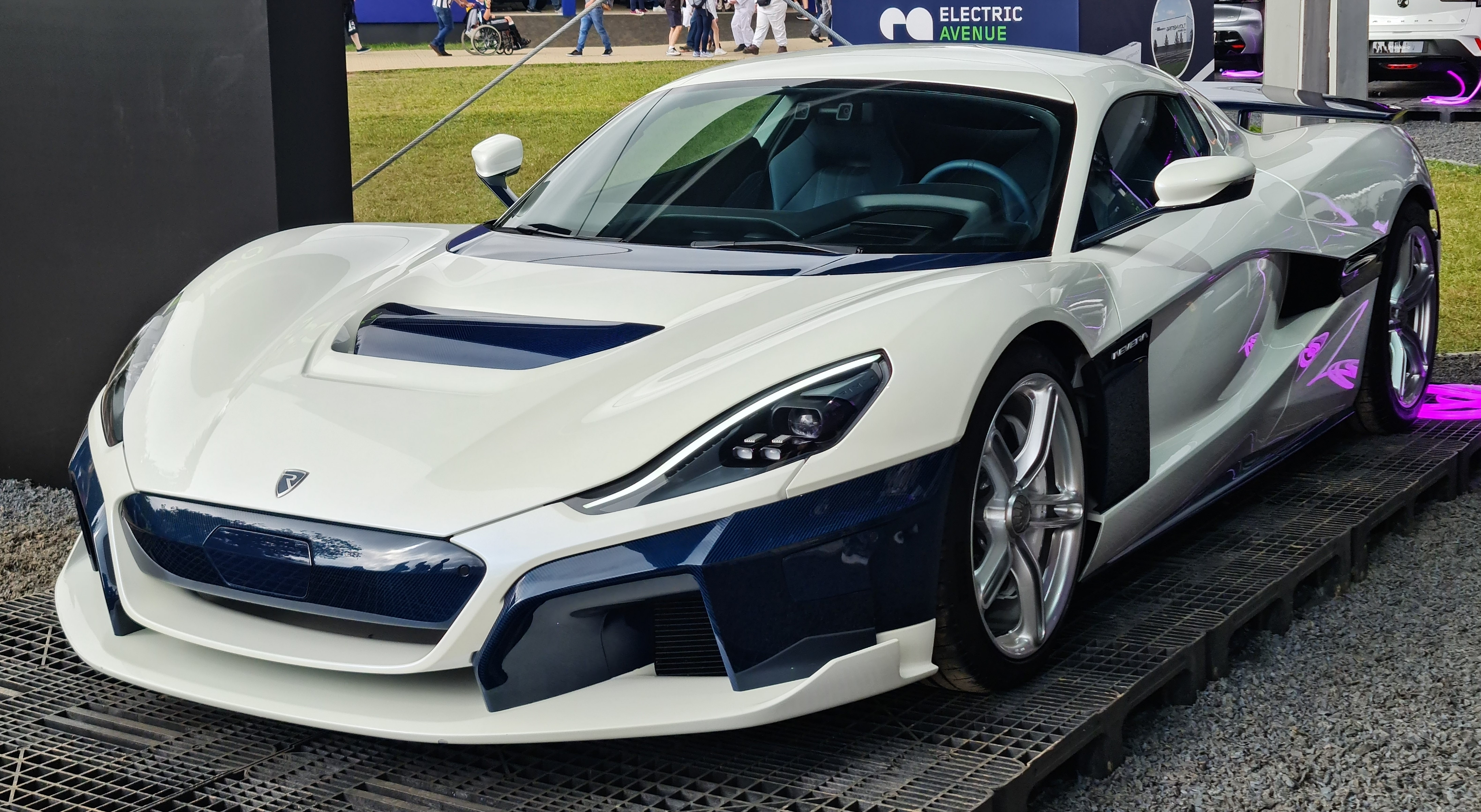

Overview
- Manufacturer: Rimac Automobili
- Also called: Rimac C_Two (concept)
- Production: 2022–2026
- Assembly: Croatia: Sveta Nedelja; Veliko Trgovišće
- Designer: Adriano Mudri (exterior)

Body and chassis
- Class: Sports car (S)
- Body style: 2-door coupé
- Layout: Individual-wheel drive
- Doors: Butterfly
- Related: Pininfarina Battista

Powertrain
- Electric motor: 4 liquid-cooled permanent magnet synchronous electric motors placed at each wheel
- Power output: 1,407.7 kW (1,888 hp; 1,914 PS)
- Transmission: Single-speed gearbox for each wheel
- Battery: 120 kWh Lithium Manganese Nickel
- Electric range: 490 km (300 miles)

Dimensions
- Wheelbase: 2,745 mm (108.1 in)
- Length: 4,750 mm (187.0 in)
- Width: 1,986 mm (78.2 in)
- Height: 1,208 mm (47.6 in)
- Curb weight: 2,300 kg (5,100 lb)

Chronology
- Predecessor: Rimac Concept One

The Rimac Nevera (pronounced: [rǐːmat͡s něʋeːra]) is an all-electric sports car designed and manufactured by the Croatian automotive manufacturer Rimac Automobili. The first production prototype car was released in August 2021. Nevera production was planned to be limited to 150 Neveras and 40 Nevera R's, however only 71 were made before production ended. Having completed crash testing for homologation, Rimac planned to deliver the Nevera to customers in mid-2022. The first production spec Nevera was delivered in August 2022. Deliveries to the United States started in June 2023. The Nevera is manufactured in the same factory and at the same rate (of roughly 1 per week) as the Pininfarina Battista, which is based on the same platform.

== Overview ==
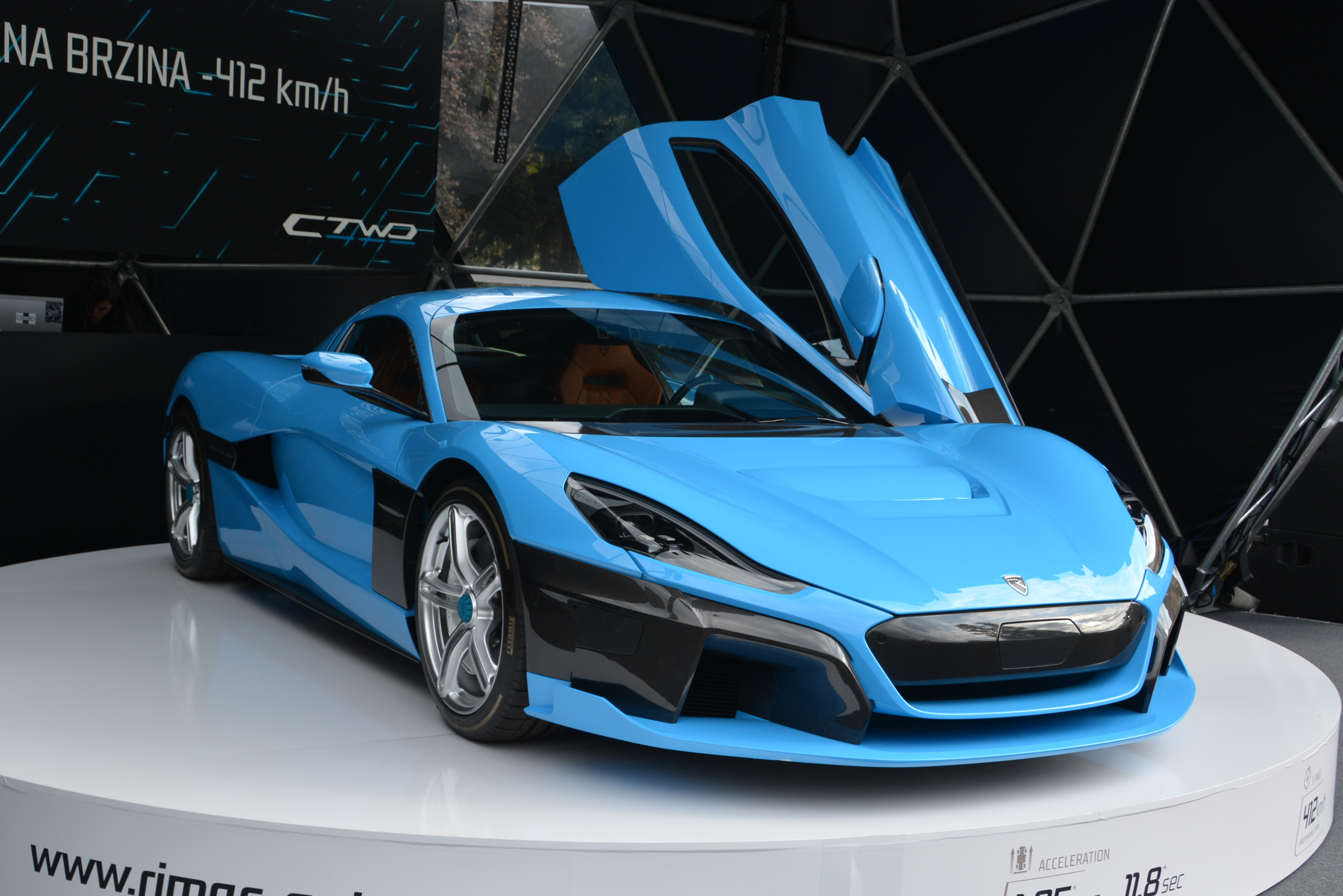
Rimac C_Two

The car was unveiled at the 2018 Geneva Motor Show as the Rimac C_Two; it was later renamed to the Nevera upon its launch. It is the automaker's second car after the Rimac Concept One. Rimac described its development as "pursuit of the ultimate electric hypercar driving experience".

The name Nevera comes from the Croatian word for sudden and short storms, usually accompanied by lightning, which occur primarily along the Croatian Adriatic coast.

== Development ==
The Nevera was initially revealed as the C_Two concept car. Since 2018, Rimac spent over three years refining the car as part of an extensive test and development programme. Almost all key components of the Nevera are designed and manufactured at Rimac's headquarters near Zagreb, Croatia.

During the global homologation process, the company constructed 4 prototypes for different testing purposes.

In June 2020, Rimac opened a new facility in Veliko Trgovišće which serves as the assembly for Nevera homologation prototypes as well as production vehicles for customers. At full capacity, it was planned that the facility would produce 4 vehicles per month, including an additional 13 prototype vehicles for homologation testing to destruction and 10 pre-production vehicles, by the end of 2020. YouTuber and automotive influencer, Misha Charoudin, was amongst the first people to test the Rimac Nevera, test driving a prototype on a closed circuit track.

In February 2022, after four years of testing, the crash test program for the global homologation of the Nevera was completed, when US passive safety tests were completed. European crash testing had already been completed in 2021.

=== Production ===
In August 2022, 2016 Formula One World Champion Nico Rosberg took delivery of car number 1 of a planned production run of 150. In May 2024, founder and CEO Mate Rimac said more than 50 vehicles had been delivered to customers, indicating that the pace was slower than anticipated. In 2026 the production of the car was ended short and only 71 cars of the total 190 planned were built.

== Performance ==
Each of the Nevera's four wheels is independently driven by a carbon-sleeve permanent-magnet electric motor through a single-speed gearbox. Combined, they produce a total of 1,914 PS (1,408 kW; 1,888 hp) and 2,360 N⋅m (1,741 lb⋅ft) of torque.

On 15 November 2022, Rimac released two videos showing the car reaching 412 km/h (256 mph) on the Automotive Testing Papenburg track in Germany, leading to media outlets calling it the "fastest electric car in the world".

Rimac announced on May 17, 2023, that the Nevera set 23 performance records in a single day, including 0–97 km/h (0–60 mph) in 1.74 s, 0–100 km/h (0–62 mph) in 1.82 s, 402 m (1/4 mile) in 8.25 s, and 0–400–0 km/h (0–249–0 mph) in 29.93 s.

On 17 July 2023, it set the record for the fastest production EV car at the Goodwood Festival of Speed, clocking at 49.32 seconds.

On 18 August 2023, it set the record for the fastest production EV car at the Nürburgring, at 7:05.298 minutes, driven by Croatian driver Martin Kodrić.

== Features and specifications ==
While also advertising a maximum range of 647 km (402 miles) on the NEDC test cycle, and 490 km (300 mi) on the WLTP driving cycle, the car is also claimed to be able to complete two consecutive laps of the Nürburgring with a negligible drop in performance. Rimac claims the car was designed to be very durable and could be driven hard. In addition to this, the car has sensors needed for SAE Level 4 of autonomous driving (for when an upgrade has been developed enable them) with full advanced driver-assistance system (ADAS). If connected to a fast charger, it can be recharged to 80% in less than 30 minutes. The car features an entirely new design and does away with the conventional doors, now incorporating butterfly doors instead. It also has a fire extinguisher in the back held in by a leather strap embossed with the words "In case of hill climb, extinguish fire", a reference to The Grand Tour host Richard Hammond who crashed a Concept One during a hill climb, causing it to catch on fire; Hammond survived the crash with a broken leg.

== Nevera R ==
Rimac unveiled the Nevera R in 17 August 2024 as a track-focused and more powerful variation of the Nevera. Each of the four electric motors were significantly improved to produce a total output of 2,107 PS (1,550 kW; 2,078 hp) and 2,360 N⋅m (1,741 lb⋅ft). The R was also lighter than the base model, weighing in approximately at 2,265 kg (4,993 lb). This meant that it accelerates from 0–97 km/h (0–60 mph) in 1.74 s (1.66 s in other tests), 0–100 km/h (0–62 mph) in 1.88 s and 0–300 km/h (0–186.5 mph) in 7.89 s, and reaches a top speed of 431.6 km/h (268.2 mph). The Nevera R features a new fixed rear wing, larger diffuser and a redesigned front bumper, increasing downforce by 15% and aero efficiency by 10%. It is also equipped with Michelin Cup 2 tyres, improved torque vectoring and a more negative camber, reducing understeer by 10% and increasing lateral grip.

=== Records ===
On 10 July 2025, Rimac set 24 world records with the Nevera R at the Automotive Testing Papenburg track in Germany, notably reaching 0–400–0 km/h (0–249–0 mph) in 25.79 s, beating the previous world record set by the Koenigsegg Jesko Absolut in 2 July 2024 with the time of 27.93 s.

== Reception ==
Jonathan Lopez of Top Speed magazine acclaimed the Nevera stating that "it is an absolute game changer, and not just in the EV segment. Between the onboard tech and mind-boggling performance specs, this machine has the goods to take on the best of the best."

Tom Ford of Top Gear tested the early prototype in March 2020. He praised the "punch out" in the corners despite the weight of the car, as well as giving plenty of feedback, concluding that "it tastes good raw, even without the torque-vectoring wizardry. ... But with a base car that shows this level of promise, and a company that focuses on fun rather than figures, this bodes well."

Vlad Savov of The Verge criticized its looks by describing them as "anonymous and unexciting", and describing them as less flamboyant than that of Lamborghini Huracán, but admitted that the car is "more forgiving and accommodating than most other hypercars", but also stated that the readouts on the infotainment were too distracting.

=== Production version ===
Top Gear, in its 2021 review of a pre-production vehicle, praised the "head spinning performance, incredible tech, ultra-stiff chassis, engineering and build quality" but noted that the brakes need getting used to and some detail finessing, giving it 9 out of 10. Chris Perkins, writing for Road & Track, called the acceleration "savage and unrelenting", noting that the "step up in performance between 'quite fast' and 'so fast it makes breathing difficult' is quite something", and ultimately calling it "the most advanced, most powerful, quickest car out there". Car and Driver had similar impressions in its review, stating that "hypercars like the Nevera aren't for everyone, but there's no denying its significance as the moment a battery-powered car toppled the Bugatti Chiron. The internal-combustion engine may never catch up". Robb Report journalist Ben Oliver noted in his impressions while driving the car that "the noise adds to the drama, as much psychological as physical, in a way no other road car can match, making for a dangerously charismatic split personality worth every one of its seven figures".

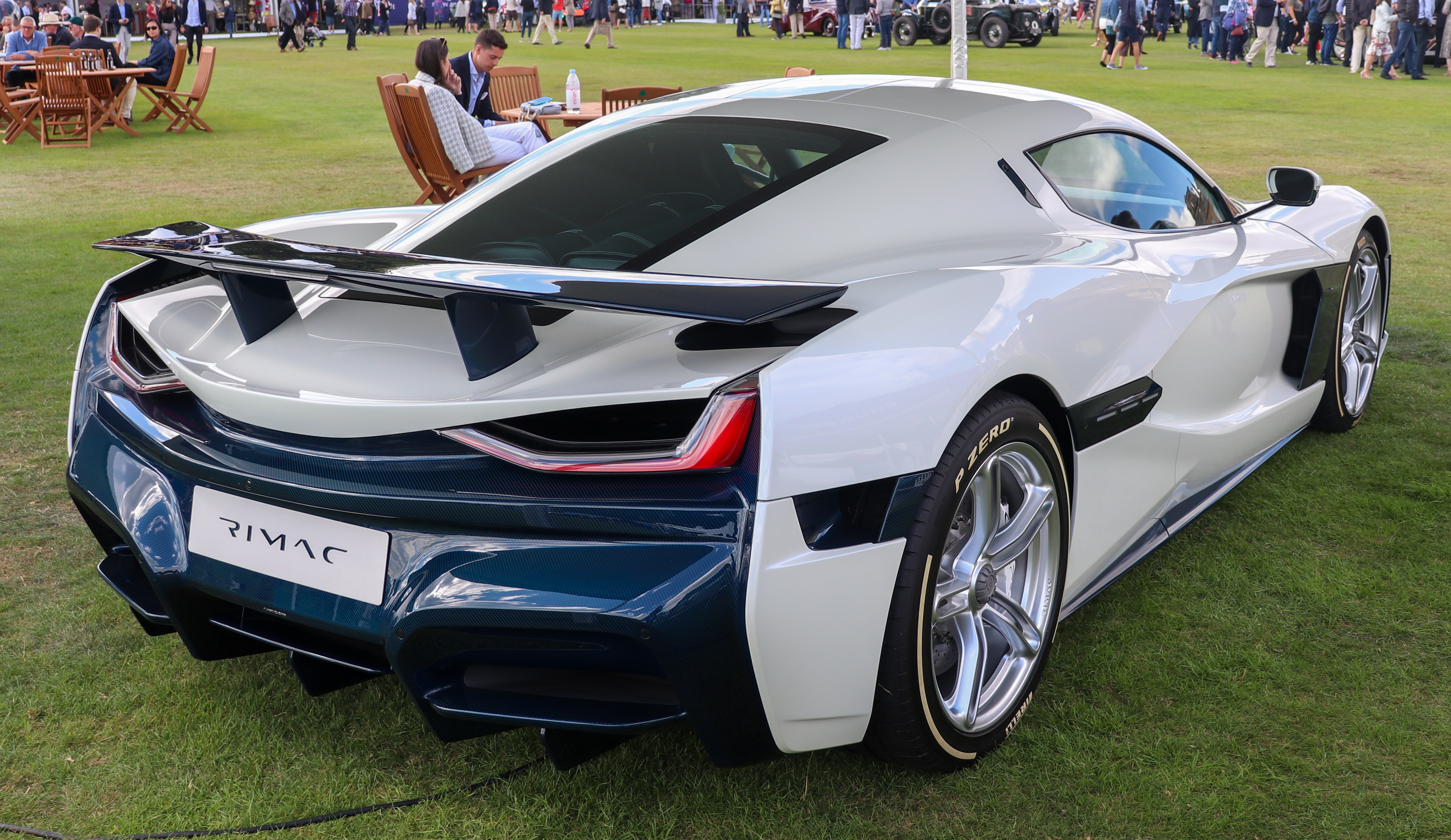
Rear view

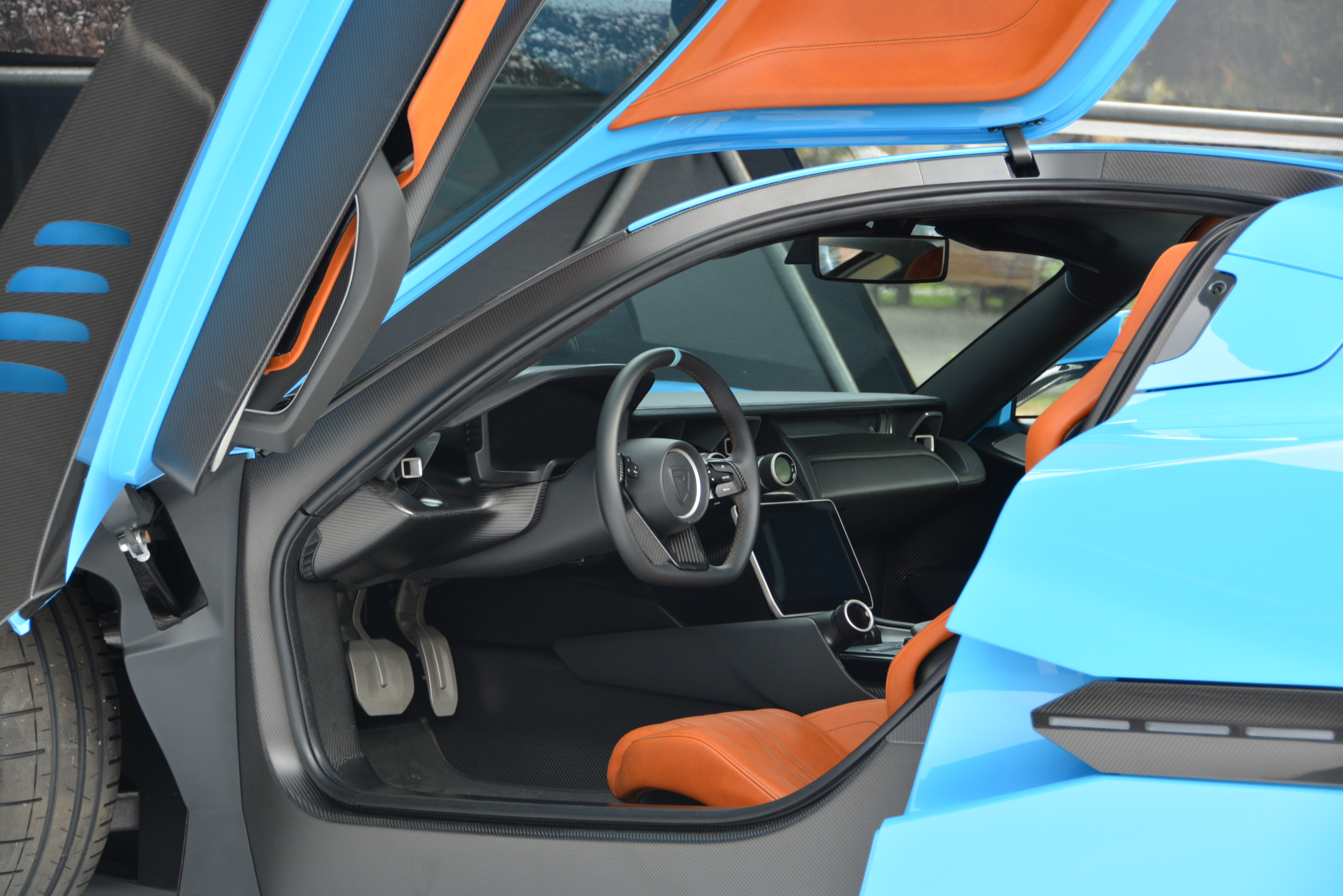
Interior

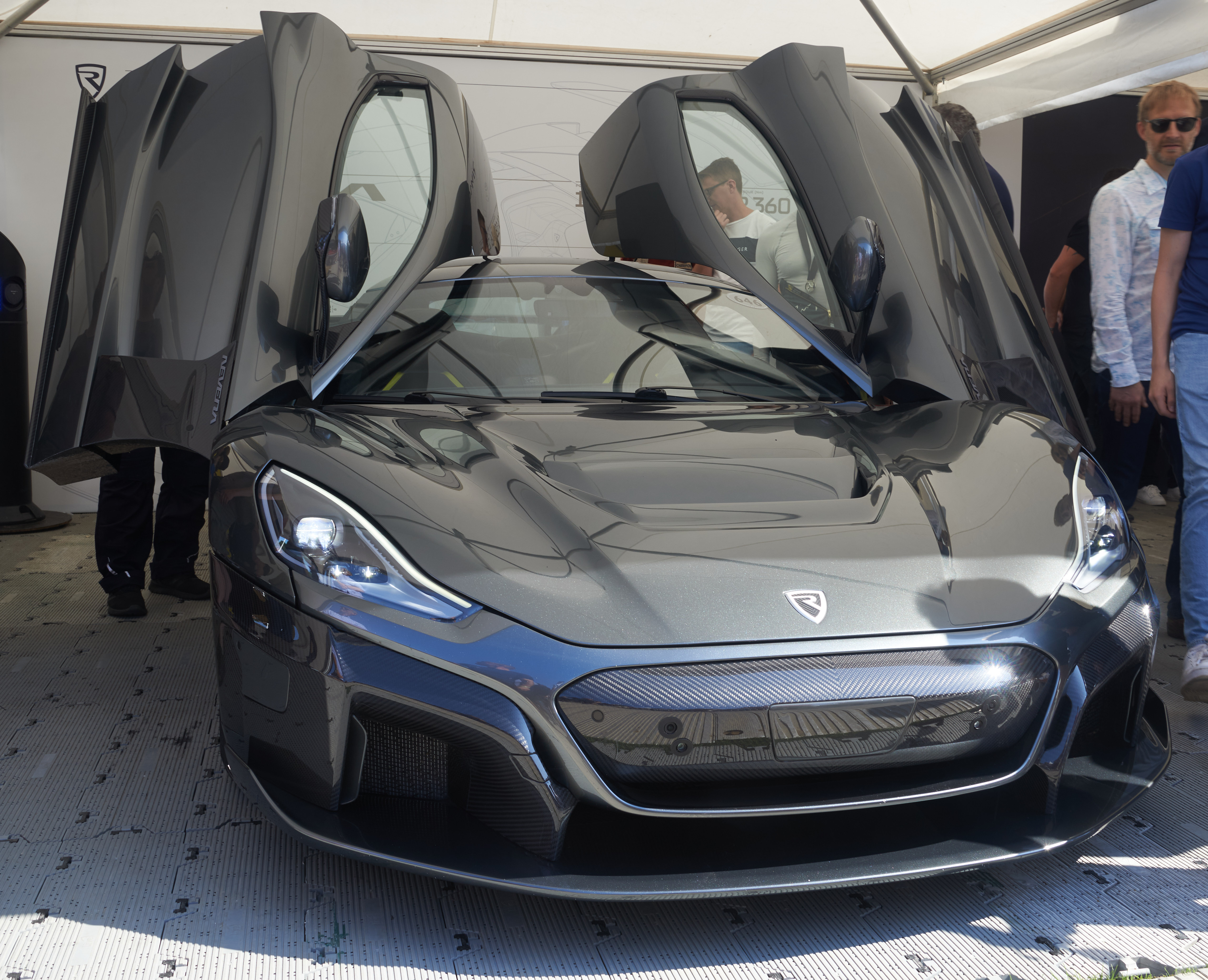
Front view with open doors at the 2021 Goodwood Festival of Speed

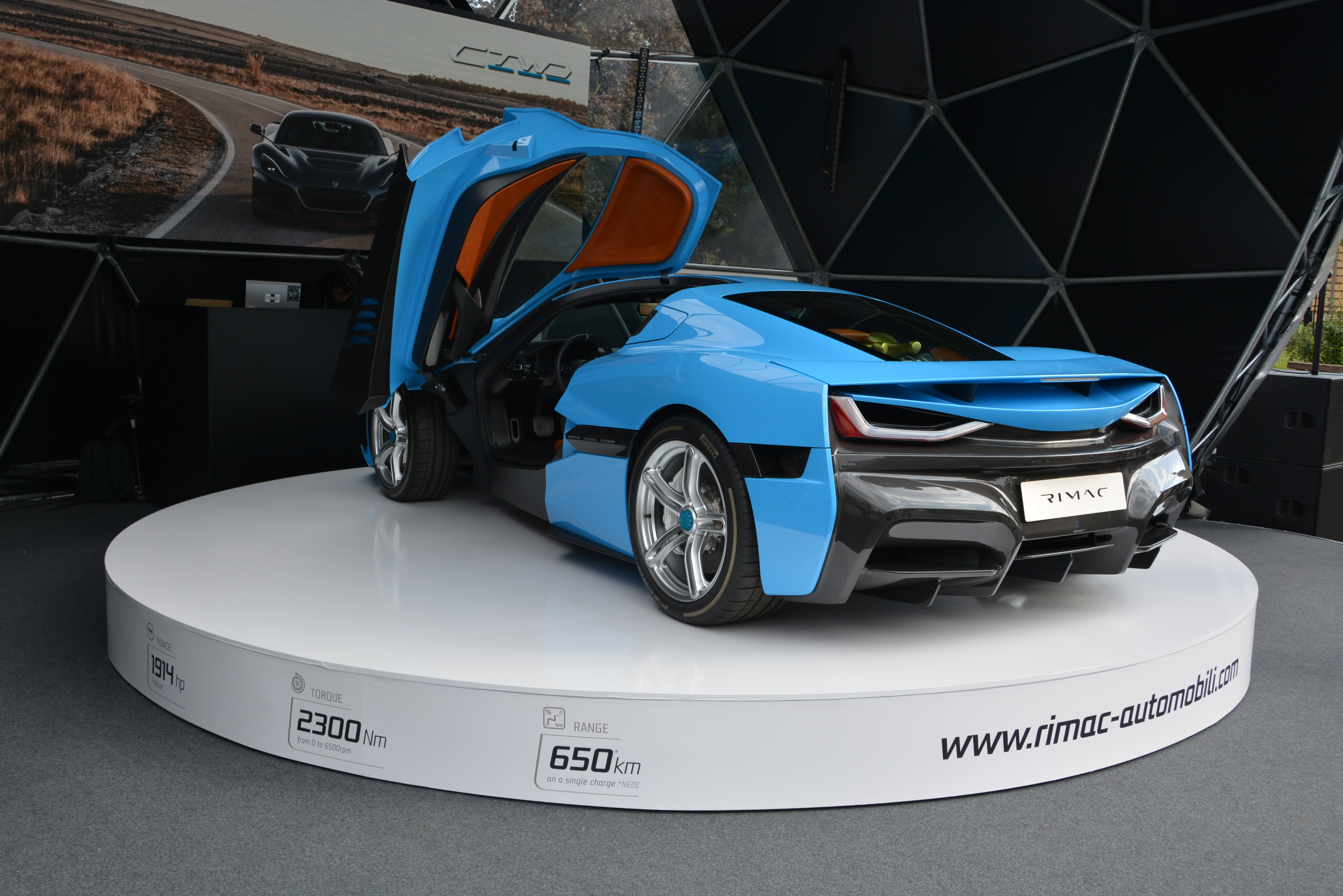

== Miniature ==
- Mattel's Hot Wheels added Nevera to their range of die-cast car models in Hotwheels' 55th year.

== See also ==
- List of fastest production cars by acceleration
- List of production cars by power output
- List of production battery electric vehicles
- Plug-in electric vehicle
