= Czinger =

American automotive company

Czinger Vehicles Inc.
- Industry: Automotive - Hypercars
- Founded: 2019; 7 years ago
- Founder: Kevin Czinger Lukas Czinger
- Headquarters: Los Angeles, California, U.S.
- Key people: Lukas Czinger (Founder and CEO) Kevin Czinger (Founder and Executive Chairman)
- Products: Sports cars
- Number of employees: 100+
- Parent: Divergent Technologies
- Website: www.czinger.com

Czinger Vehicles Inc., commonly known as Czinger is an American automobile manufacturer of hybrid sports cars based in Los Angeles, California, operating since 2019.

== History ==
In 2019, Lukas Czinger and Kevin Czinger founded the company. Czinger Vehicles is headquartered in Los Angeles, and designs and manufactures supercars.

The first vehicle developed and constructed by the company was the 21C. The 21C entered production in 2025. The 21C is notable for its performance, and use of generative design and additive manufacturing. The 21C is planned to be a limited run of 80 vehicles.

Czinger Vehicles is represented by a global network of luxury automotive dealers including O'Gara Coach in California and H.R. Owen in London, UK.

== Vehicles ==
- Divergent Blade (concept car for 21C)
- 21C
- 21C V Max
- Blackbird
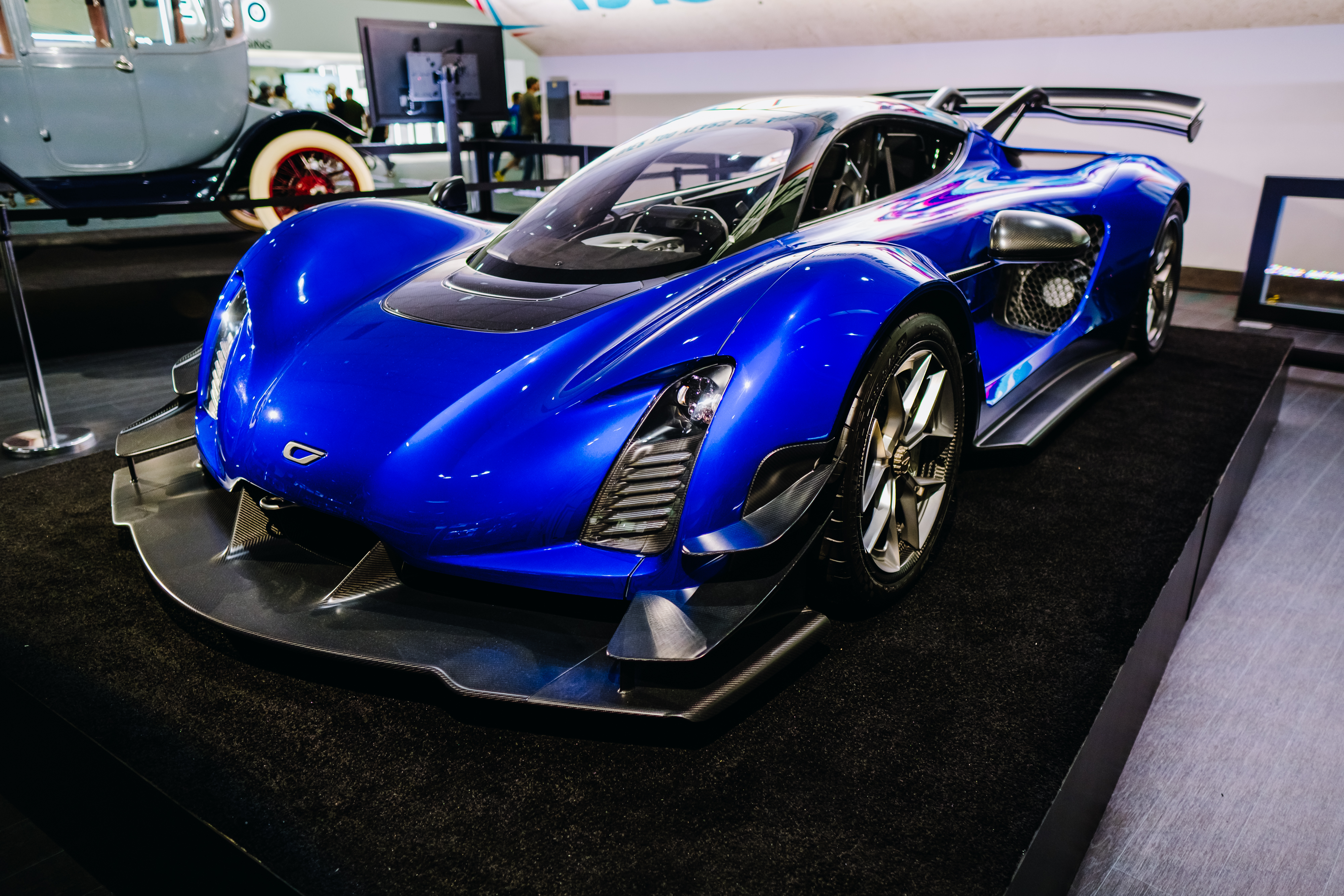
Czinger 21C
