= Mercedes 60hp =

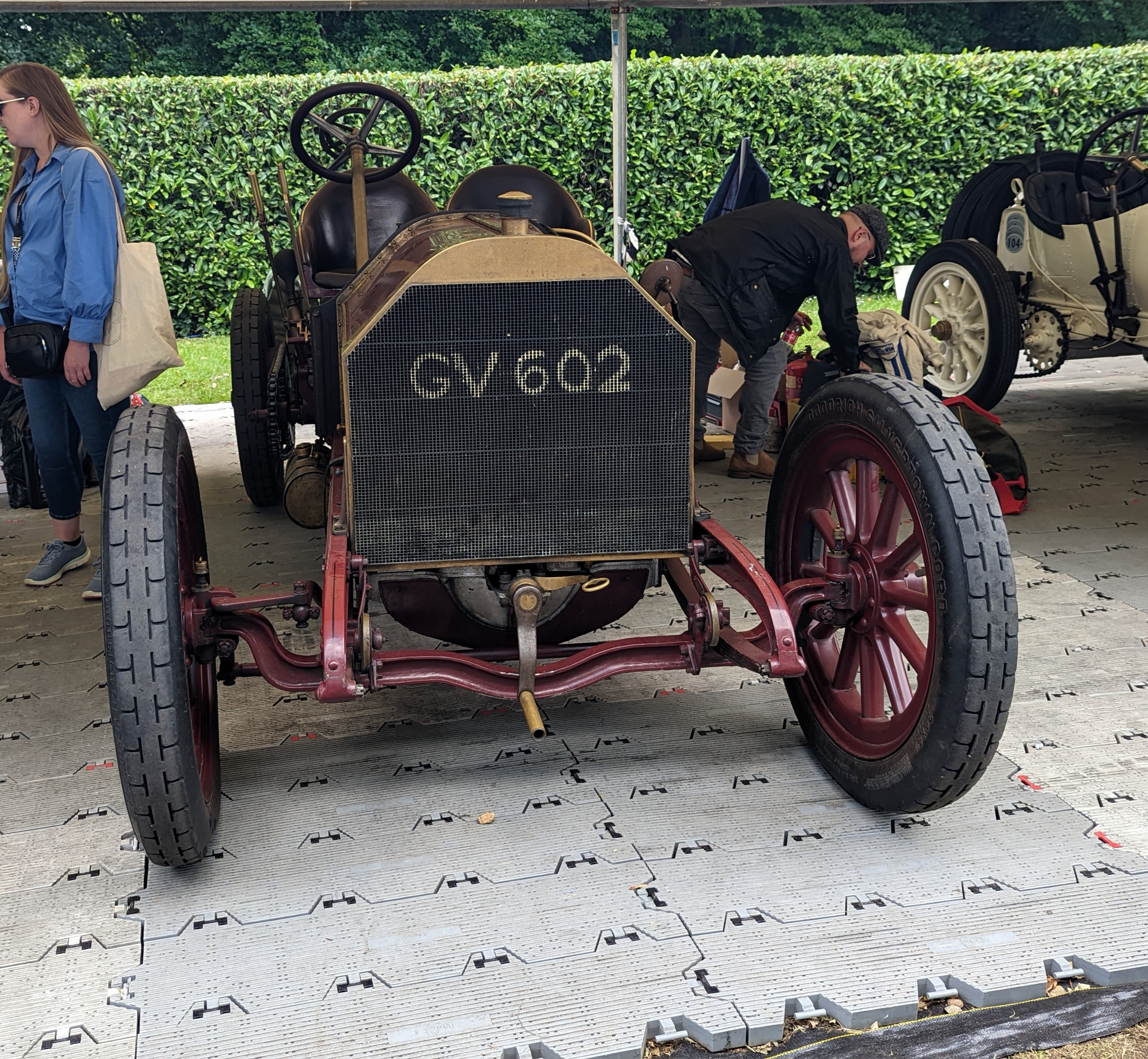
Mercedes 60 hp at Goodwood, 2022

The Mercedes Simplex 60 hp was an automobile manufactured by Daimler Motoren Gesellschaft in 1903 and 1904, part of the series of Mercedes Simplex with more comfortable, simplified operation, aimed at customers who preferred to drive rather than being passengers.

Its predecessor were the Mercedes 35hp racers which in 1900 were ordered by Emil Jellinek. It was the fastest production car in the world, winning races and gaining fame to the name Mercédès which Jellinek took from his daughter, and in 1903 adopted for himself, just like Daimler for its products.

Unlike the 35 hp though, this wasn't a racing car and became Mercedes' top of the range model. It had a low pressed steel chassis and a cast-alloy 9.3L engine, giving a top speed of 68 mph (109 km/h). The car came with two or four passenger bodywork. Of the 102 chassis produced, only four still exist today.

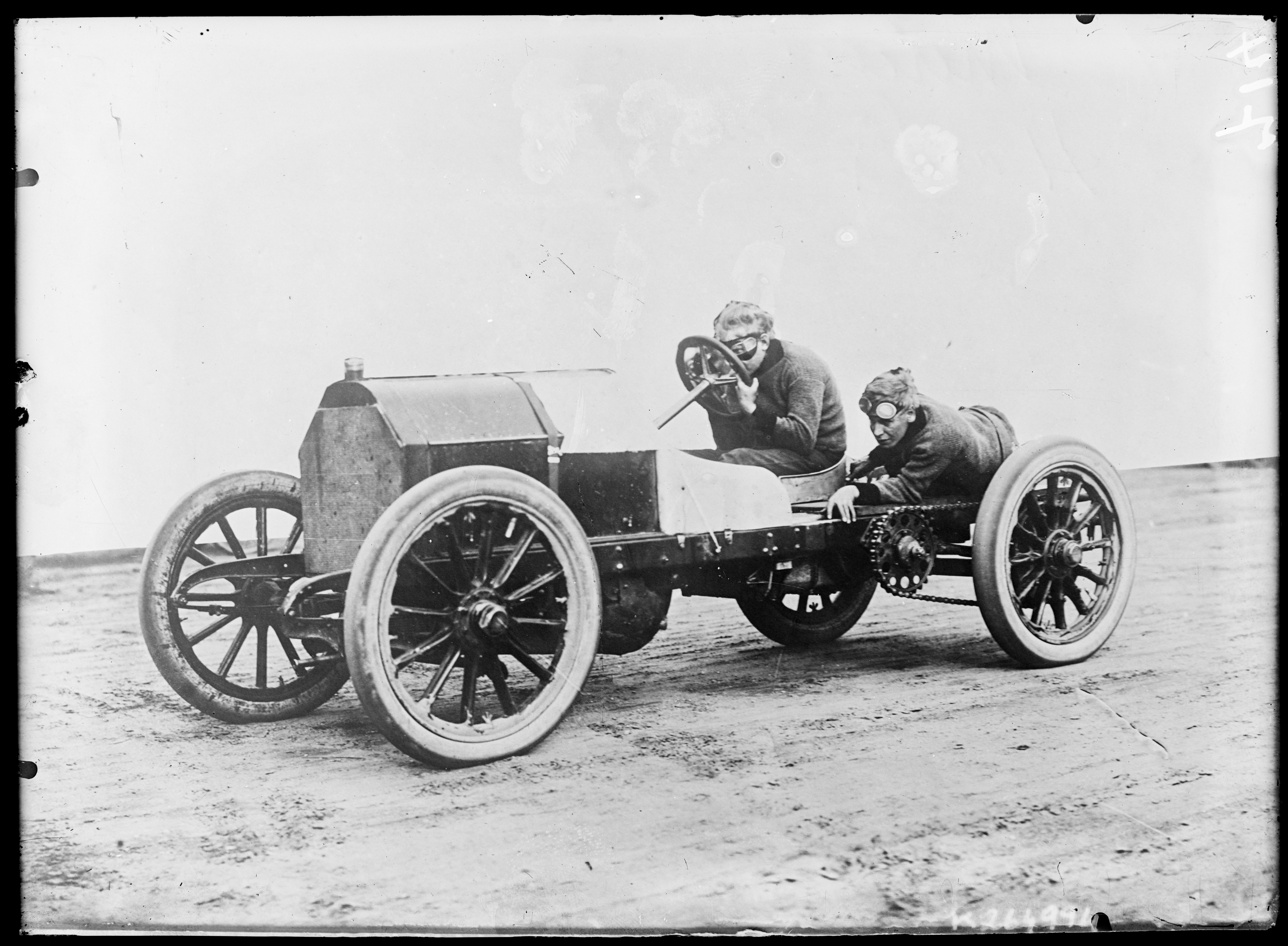
Edward Hawley and the car owned by E. R. Thomas, 1905

Mercedes 60 hp	Statistics
Country of Origin	Germany
Years of Production	1903-04
Displacement	9293 cc
Configuration	Front-Mounted 4-cyl
Transmission	4-Speed Manual, Rear Wheel Drive
Power	60 bhp (45 kW)
Torque	N/A
Top Speed	68 mph (109 km/h)
0-60 mph	N/A

== History ==
On 11/12 July 1904 Harry Harkness set the first record for the Mount Washington Hillclimb Auto Race with a time of 24 minutes 37.6 seconds.

== See also ==
- Timeline of most powerful production cars
