= List of production cars by power output =

This list of most powerful production cars in the world is limited to unmodified production cars which meet the eligibility criteria below. All entries must verified from reliable sources.

== Eligible cars ==
Because of inconsistencies in the definitions of production cars, dubious claims by manufacturers and self-interest groups, and inconsistent or changing application of definitions, this list has a defined set of requirements. For explanation of how these were determined, see the links above.

For the purposes of this list, a production car is defined as a vehicle that conforms to at least one of the following two definitions:

(A.)

1. Constructed principally for retail sale to consumers for their personal use, and to transport people on public roads (no commercial or industrial vehicles are eligible)
2. Had 25 or more instances made by the original vehicle manufacturer and offered for commercial sale to the public in new condition (cars modified by either professional tuners or individuals are not eligible)
3. Street-legal in their intended markets and capable of passing any official tests or inspections required to be granted this status

(B.)

1. Constructed principally for retail sale to consumers, for their personal use, to transport people on public roads (no commercial or industrial vehicles are eligible)
2. Available for commercial sale to the public in the same specification as the vehicle used to achieve the record
3. Manufactured in the record-claiming specification by a manufacturer whose WMI number is shown on the VIN, including vehicles modified by either professional tuners or others that result in a VIN with a WMI number in their name (for example, if a Porsche-based car is remanufactured by RUF and has RUF's WMI W09, it is eligible; but if it has Porsche's WMI, WP0, it is not eligible)
4. Pre-1981 vehicles must be made by the original vehicle manufacturer and not modified by either professional tuners or individuals
5. Street-legal in its intended markets, having fulfilled the homologation tests or inspections required under either a) United States of America, b) European Union, or c) Japanese law to be granted this status
6. Sold in more than one national market

=== Further limitations ===
For the purpose of manageability, this list is limited to production cars that have at least 600 kilowatts. Car models with higher-powered variants are listed only in their most powerful incarnation (for example, the Agera RS would be listed in place of the standard Agera, although the Agera makes over 600 kW). For the timeline of most powerful cars, the production car definition is only applied to modern (post-WWII) cars due to the scarcity of reliable info on Veteran and Vintage era automobiles.

== Most powerful production cars ==
Vehicle	Year	Power	Type	Notes	Ref.
Koenigsegg Gemera	2026	1,715 kW (2,300 hp; 2,332 PS)	Plug-in hybrid	300 units planned	
Rimac Nevera R	2025	1,550 kW (2,079 hp; 2,107 PS)	Electric	40 units planned	
Hennessey Venom F5	2021	1,515 kW (2,032 hp; 2,060 PS)	Internal combustion	Max output for Venom F5 with Evolution package. 99 units planned.	
Lotus Evija	2023	1,500 kW (2,012 hp; 2,039 PS)	Electric	130 units produced	
Aspark Owl	2020	1,456 kW (1,953 hp; 1,980 PS)	Electric		
Pininfarina Battista	2022	1,417 kW (1,900 hp; 1,927 PS)	Electric	150 units planned	
Rimac Nevera	2022	1,408 kW (1,888 hp; 1,914 PS)	Electric	50 units delivered out of 150 planned.	
SSC Tuatara	2020	1,305 kW (1,750 hp; 1,774 PS)	Internal combustion	100 units planned	
Koenigsegg Jesko	2023	1,193 kW (1,600 hp; 1,622 PS)	Internal combustion	125 units planned	
Bugatti Chiron Super Sport 300+/Centodieci	2021/2022	1,177 kW (1,578 hp; 1,600 PS)	Internal combustion	30 Chiron Super Sport 300+ and 10 Centodieci units produced.	
Xiaomi SU7 Ultra	2025	1,138 kW (1,526 hp; 1,547 PS)	Electric		
Koenigsegg Regera	2016	1,119 kW (1,500 hp; 1,521 PS)	Plug-in hybrid	80 units produced.	
Bugatti Chiron/Bugatti Divo	2016/2020	1,103 kW (1,479 hp; 1,500 PS)	Internal combustion	500 Chiron units produced, 40 Divo units produced.	
Czinger 21C	2021	1,006 kW (1,349 hp; 1,368 PS)	Hybrid electric	80 units to be produced	
Koenigsegg One:1/Agera RS	2014/2015	1,000 kW (1,341 hp; 1,360 PS)	Internal combustion	Max output for Agera RS with 1 MW upgrade. 25 Agera RS, 7 One:1 unit produced.	
NIO EP9	2016	1,000 kW (1,341 hp; 1,360 PS)	Electric	16 units produced. Up to 250 units planned for Evolution model.	
SSC Ultimate Aero TT	2009	960 kW (1,287 hp; 1,305 PS)	Internal combustion	Updated from 2007 TT model (882 kW (1,183 hp; 1,199 PS)). 24+ TT models produced.	
Yangwang U9/Yangwang U7	2024	960 kW (1,287 hp; 1,305 PS)	Electric		
Zeekr 001 FR	2023	930 kW (1,247 hp; 1,264 PS)	Electric	99 units produced per month	
Hyptec SSR Ultimate/Aion Hyper SSR Ultimate	2023	913 kW (1,225 hp; 1,242 PS)	Electric		
Drako GTE	2020	895 kW (1,200 hp; 1,217 PS)	Electric	25 units produced	
Lucid Air Sapphire	2023	895 kW (1,200 hp; 1,217 PS)	Electric	250 units planned.	
Bugatti Veyron Super Sport/Grand Sport Vitesse	2010/2012	882 kW (1,183 hp; 1,200 PS)	Internal combustion	140 units produced.	
Yangwang U8	2023	880 kW (1,180 hp; 1,196 PS)	Plug-in hybrid		
Zenvo TSR-S	2018	878 kW (1,177 hp; 1,194 PS)	Internal combustion	5 units produced per year.	
Aston Martin Valkyrie	2022	850 kW (1,140 hp; 1,156 PS)	Hybrid electric	150 units planned.	
Porsche Cayenne Turbo Electric	2026	849 kW (1,139 hp; 1,155 PS)	Electric	Most powerful Porsche road car ever.	
Zenvo ST1	2009	812 kW (1,089 hp; 1,104 PS)	Internal combustion	15 units produced.	
M-Hero 917 BEV	2023	800 kW (1,073 hp; 1,088 PS)	Electric	1500 units per year planned for BEV and EREV (600 kW (805 hp; 816 PS)) versions combined.	
Aston Martin Valhalla	2021	793 kW (1,064 hp; 1,079 PS)	Plug-in hybrid	Limited to 999 units.	
Chevrolet Corvette (C8) ZR1	2025	793 kW (1,064 hp; 1,079 PS)	Internal combustion		
Faraday Future FF 91	2023	783 kW (1,050 hp; 1,065 PS)	Electric	300 units planned for Futurist Alliance model.	
Mercedes-AMG One	2022	782 kW (1,049 hp; 1,063 PS)	Plug-in hybrid	Most powerful Mercedes road car ever made, 275 units planned.	
McLaren Speedtail	2020	772 kW (1,035 hp; 1,050 PS)	Hybrid electric	106 units planned.	
Dodge Challenger SRT Demon 170	2023	764 kW (1,025 hp; 1,039 PS)	Internal combustion	3300 units planned	
Tesla Model S Plaid/Tesla Model X Plaid	2021/2022	761 kW (1,020 hp; 1,034 PS)	Electric		
Lamborghini Revuelto	2023	746 kW (1,001 hp; 1,015 PS)	Plug-in hybrid		
GMC Hummer EV Edition 1/EV3X	2022	746 kW (1,000 hp; 1,014 PS)	Electric		
Bugatti Veyron	2005	736 kW (987 hp; 1,001 PS)	Internal combustion	Fastest road car in 2005	
Ferrari SF90 Stradale	2020	735 kW (986 hp; 1,000 PS)	Plug-in hybrid	Up to 2000 units per year planned.	
Denza Z9/Z9 GT BEV	2024	710 kW (952 hp; 965 PS)	Electric		
LaFerrari	2013	708 kW (949 hp; 963 PS)	Hybrid electric	710+ units produced.	
Koenigsegg Agera	2010	706 kW (947 hp; 960 PS)	Internal combustion	7 units produced	
McLaren P1	2013	674 kW (903 hp; 916 PS)	Plug-in hybrid	375 units produced.	
Porsche 918 Spyder	2013	652 kW (874 hp; 886 PS)	Plug-in hybrid	918 units produced.	
Tesla Cybertruck Cyberbeast	2024	630 kW (845 hp; 857 PS)	Electric		
Rivian R1T/Rivian R1S Quad-Motor	2021/2022	623 kW (835 hp; 847 PS)	Electric		
Mercedes-AMG GT 63 S E-Performance	2021	620 kW (831 hp; 843 PS)	Plug-in hybrid	Most powerful AMG GT 4-door model	
Ferrari Daytona SP3	2023	618 kW (829 hp; 840 PS)	Internal combustion	599 units to be produced.	
Lucid Gravity Grand Touring	2025	617 kW (828 hp; 839 PS)	Electric		
Pagani Huayra Imola	2020	617 kW (827 hp; 839 PS)	Internal combustion	5 units planned.	
McLaren Sabre	2021	614 kW (824 hp; 835 PS)	Internal combustion	15 units will be produced in total, currently the most powerful non-hybrid McLaren model ever made	
Ferrari 12Cilindri	2024	610 kW (819 hp; 830 PS)	Internal combustion		
Ferrari 296 GTB	2022	610 kW (819 hp; 830 PS)	Plug-in hybrid		
Ferrari 812 Competizione/Competizione A	2021	610 kW (819 hp; 830 PS)	Internal combustion	999 Competizione and 599 Competizione A will be produced in total	
Lamborghini Sián FKP 37	2020	602 kW (807 hp; 818 PS)	Hybrid electric	63 units produced.	
Koenigsegg CCR/CCX	2004/2006	601 kW (806 hp; 817 PS)	Internal combustion	14 CCR and 29 CCX units produced.	
Lamborghini Countach LPI 800-4	2022	599 kW (803 hp; 814 PS)	Internal combustion	112 units to be produced.	
Polestar 5	2026	650 kW (872 hp; 884 PS)	Electric		

== Timeline of most powerful production cars ==
Vehicle	Year	Power	Notes	Ref.
Benz Patent-Motorwagen	1886	0.6 kW (0.7 hp; 0.8 PS)	First commercially available automobile in history	
Benz Velo	1894	1.1 kW (1.5 hp; 1.5 PS)	First production car	
Peugeot Type 15	1897	6 kW (8 hp; 8 PS)	Peugeot's first in-house engine	
Daimler Phoenix (de)	1899	17 kW (23 hp; 23 PS)	First four-cylinder road car	
Mercedes 35 HP	1901	26 kW (35 hp; 35 PS)	Originally designed as a race car, developed for road use	
Mercedes Simplex	1902	33 kW (44 hp; 45 PS)	Successor to the 35 HP	
Mercedes Simplex 60 HP	1903	44 kW (59 hp; 60 PS)		
Hispano-Suiza 60/75	1907	55 kW (74 hp; 75 PS)		
80 Napier	1908	67 kW (90 hp; 91 PS)		
Isotta Fraschini Tipo KM	1910	89 kW (119 hp; 121 PS)		
Benz 82/200 HP (de)	1912	147 kW (197 hp; 200 PS)	Powered by a modified airship engine	
Bugatti Type 41	1927	221 kW (296 hp; 300 PS)	Also known as the Royale	
Duesenberg Model SJ	1932	239 kW (320 hp; 324 PS)	Supercharged version of the Model J	
Duesenberg Model SSJ	1935	291–298 kW (390–400 hp; 395–406 PS)	The short-wheelbase version of the Model SJ	
Mercury Monterey	1958	298 kW (400 hp; 405 PS)	Super Marauder engine available in all 1958 Mercury vehicles.	
Plymouth Fury Max Wedge Ramcharger II	1963	317 kW (425 hp; 431 PS)	Made for drag racing.	
Shelby Cobra Mk. III 427 Competition	1965	362 kW (485 hp; 492 PS)	Last car on list measured by SAE gross power.	
Porsche 959 S	1988	379 kW (508 hp; 515 PS)	29 produced.	
Bugatti EB110	1991	412 kW (553 hp; 560 PS)	139 produced.	
McLaren F1	1992	461 kW (618 hp; 627 PS)	106 produced.	
Dauer 962 Le Mans	1993	537 kW (720 hp; 730 PS)	13 produced.	
Koenigsegg CCR	2004	601 kW (806 hp; 817 PS)	14 produced.	
Bugatti Veyron	2005	736 kW (987 hp; 1,001 PS)	310 produced (16.4 and Grand Sport). First car with a double-clutch transmission on list.	
SSC Ultimate Aero TT	2009	960 kW (1,287 hp; 1,305 PS)	Last car with a manual transmission on list.	
Koenigsegg One:1	2014	1,000 kW (1,341 hp; 1,360 PS)	7 produced.	
Koenigsegg Regera	2016	1,119 kW (1,500 hp; 1,521 PS)	80 units produced. First hybrid car on list.	
Bugatti Chiron Super Sport 300+	2021	1,176 kW (1,578 hp; 1,600 PS)	30 produced.	
Hennessey Venom F5	2021	1,355 kW (1,817 hp; 1,842 PS)	Last exclusively fossil fuel car on the list.	
Rimac Nevera	2022	1,408 kW (1,888 hp; 1,914 PS)	150 units to be produced. First all-electric car on the list.	
Lotus Evija	2023	1,500 kW (2,012 hp; 2,039 PS)	130 units produced.	
Rimac Nevera R	2025	1,550 kW (2,079 hp; 2,107 PS)	40 units planned.	
Koenigsegg Gemera	2026	1,715 kW (2,300 hp; 2,332 PS)	300 units planned.	
Yangwang U9 Xtreme	2026	2,220 kW (3,018 PS; 2,977 hp)	30 units planned.	

== See also ==
- Engine power
- List of fastest production cars by acceleration
- List of production car speed records
- List of automotive superlatives
