= Divergent Blade =

Sports car

Overview
- Manufacturer: Czinger
- Assembly: Gardena, California
- Designer: Kevin Czinger

Body and chassis
- Class: Sports car (S)
- Body style: 2-door coupe
- Layout: MR layout

Powertrain
- Engine: 2389 cc 4B11T turbo I4
- Power output: 720 hp (537 kW; 730 PS)
- Transmission: 7-speed Hewland sequential

Dimensions
- Curb weight: 630 kg (1,389 lb)

Chronology
- Successor: Czinger 21C

The Divergent Blade is a two-door sports car prototype manufactured and designed by Kevin Czinger. The Blade is the first automobile to use 3D printing to form the body and chassis.

The Blade ended up being the backbone of the eventual production car dubbed the Czinger 21C.

== Usage of 3D printing ==
The use of 3D construction further reduces the expense of building factories and pollution from them, with a more compact and cheaper process. This also can lower capital investment and production costs.

== Vehicle data ==
The car contains a 2.4-liter 4B11T turbocharged inline-four derived from the Mitsubishi Lancer Evolution X. The engine has been modified by American tuning house AMS, which meant bore and stroke was increased by 400cc, increasing the displacement to 2.4 liters. The modifications have increased output to 720 hp (537 kW; 730 PS) and 500 lb⋅ft (678 N⋅m) of torque. The horsepower and weight create a power-to-weight ratio of 1,142.8 hp (852 kW; 1,159 PS) per ton. 0–60 mph (0–97 km/h) is a reported 2.2 seconds.

The car uses a 3D printed aluminum alloy material for the chassis and body. For the chassis, 3D printed structural joints (in which Divergent calls NODES) are used to construct the basis of the interior, which is then completed by metal parts made by computer algorithm. Because of the use of a 3D printed aluminum material, the overall weight is drastically reduced, sitting at 630 kg (1,389 lb). The chassis weighs 46 kg (101 lb). The car's design is bobsled-like, allowing for better weight distribution. The remaining areas would be filled by aerodynamic features and safety parts.

The 3D construction makes the car de-materialized, making the car greener (less resource use and pollution made by manufacturing), lighter (up to 90% lighter than traditional vehicles with more strength and durability), safer (a strong and light car causes less wear and fewer fatalities), and made local (cars built by smaller local groups lowers costs, time, and increase quality).
