= SSC North America =

American automobile manufacturer

- Formerly: Shelby Supercars
- Type: Privately held company
- Industry: Automotive
- Founded: 1999
- Founder: Jerod Shelby
- Headquarters: Richland, Washington, U.S.
- Area served: Worldwide
- Products: Sports cars
- Owner: Jerod Shelby
- Website: www.sscnorthamerica.com

SSC North America (formerly Shelby SuperCars Inc.) is an American automobile manufacturer founded in 1999 by owner Jerod Shelby. The company is based in Richland, in the Tri-Cities, Washington, and specializes in the production of sports cars.

== History ==
- 1998 - Company founded by current CEO Jerod Shelby.
- 2004 - First SSC Ultimate Aero prototype completed at company headquarters in West Richland, Washington.
- 2006 - Ultimate Aero sets record on Road & Track magazine's slalom course, breaking previous record held by the Ferrari Enzo.
- September 13, 2007 - SSC Ultimate Aero sets record for fastest production vehicle as verified by Guinness World Records, reaching a top speed 412 km/h (256 mph) averaged over two runs in opposite directions (414.31 km/h (257 mph) and 410.24 km/h (255 mph)).
- 2008 - SSC announced plans to unveil the Ultimate Aero EV (Electric Vehicle). SSC expects to roll out its first prototype in February 2009. The car was advertised in the original press release as rechargeable in 10 minutes from a 240 V outlet, which has been criticized as impossible in some articles. The press release has since changed.
  - July 10, 2008 - SSC announced it would open its Dubai showroom in February 2009.'
- August 23, 2010 - A USA Today article details the rivalry between Shelby and Bugatti for the title of World's fastest Car and CEO Jerod Shelby announces a next generation version of the SSC Ultimate Aero is in the works.
- July 17, 2011 - SSC announces their next generation sports car has been named Tuatara. It uses a proprietary 6.9 liter V8 engine and is said to produce a rated output of 1,350 hp (1,007 kW) and a maximum output of 1,700 hp (1,268 kW).
- 2012 - Shelby SuperCars changes their name to SSC North America as a result of a settlement with Carroll Shelby Licensing and Carroll Shelby International.
  - August 2012 - SSC announces a special edition of the SSC Ultimate Aero called XT. With the new SSC Tuatara on its way, SSC is retiring the SSC Ultimate Aero ending its production with a limited special edition. To celebrate its run SSC is launching the final special edition named SSC Ultimate Aero XT. The car will be built in a limited run of just five examples and will utilize some key assemblies that will feature in the SSC Tuatara, for instance, SSC's proprietary developed 6.9 liter all-aluminum twin-turbo V8 engine unit and several other features to go along with the new engine unit such as enhanced cooling, transmission upgrades as well as a seven-speed paddle-shifted gearbox. The engine is officially rated at 1,300 hp (969 kW) and 1,004 lb⋅ft (1,361 N⋅m) of torque.
- 2013 - A Prototype SSC Tuatara is unveiled at the Dubai International Motor Show and titled the "Crown Jewel" of the event.
- 2015 - Last Ultimate Aero XT is delivered and production of the model is completed.
- 2018 - SSC North America announces release of 2019 SSC Tuatara at Pebble Beach Concours d'Elegance.
- 2019 - Tuatara production underway with first deliveries anticipated for Q3 2019.
- January 2020 - First production Tuatara is delivered to its owner in Philadelphia, Pennsylvania.
- October 10, 2020 - SSC North America conducts its first high speed test in Pahrump, Nevada, initially claiming an average top speed of 316.1 mph. This claim was later retracted when discrepancies between satellite data and video analysis indicated a discrepancy in the speed. CEO Jerod Shelby publicly addressed the mistakes and promised further testing to rely on more redundancies and transparency.
- January 17, 2021 - Continued high speed testing of the Tuatara at Kennedy Space Center's Shuttle Landing Facility produced an average top speed of 282.9 mph (455.3 km/h) on a 2.5 mile stretch of runway (Northbound: 279.7 mph (450.1 km/h), Southbound: 286.1 mph (460.4 km/h)). The high speed runs were driven by the owner of the Tuatara, Larry Caplin, a non-professional driver. Present at the test was Race Logic, an automotive telemetry firm, and independent analyst Robert Mitchell, who was one of the most outspoken critics of SSC's October 2020 speed claim.
- May 14, 2022 - Larry Caplin's Tuatara reached a one-way speed of 295 mph (475 km/h) over the course of 2.3 miles (3.7 km) at Space Florida's Launch and Landing Facility. This was verified by two Racelogic VBOX GNSS and a Life Racing GPS speed measurement systems, as well as a Racelogic technician on hand.

== Models ==
=== SSC Ultimate Aero ===
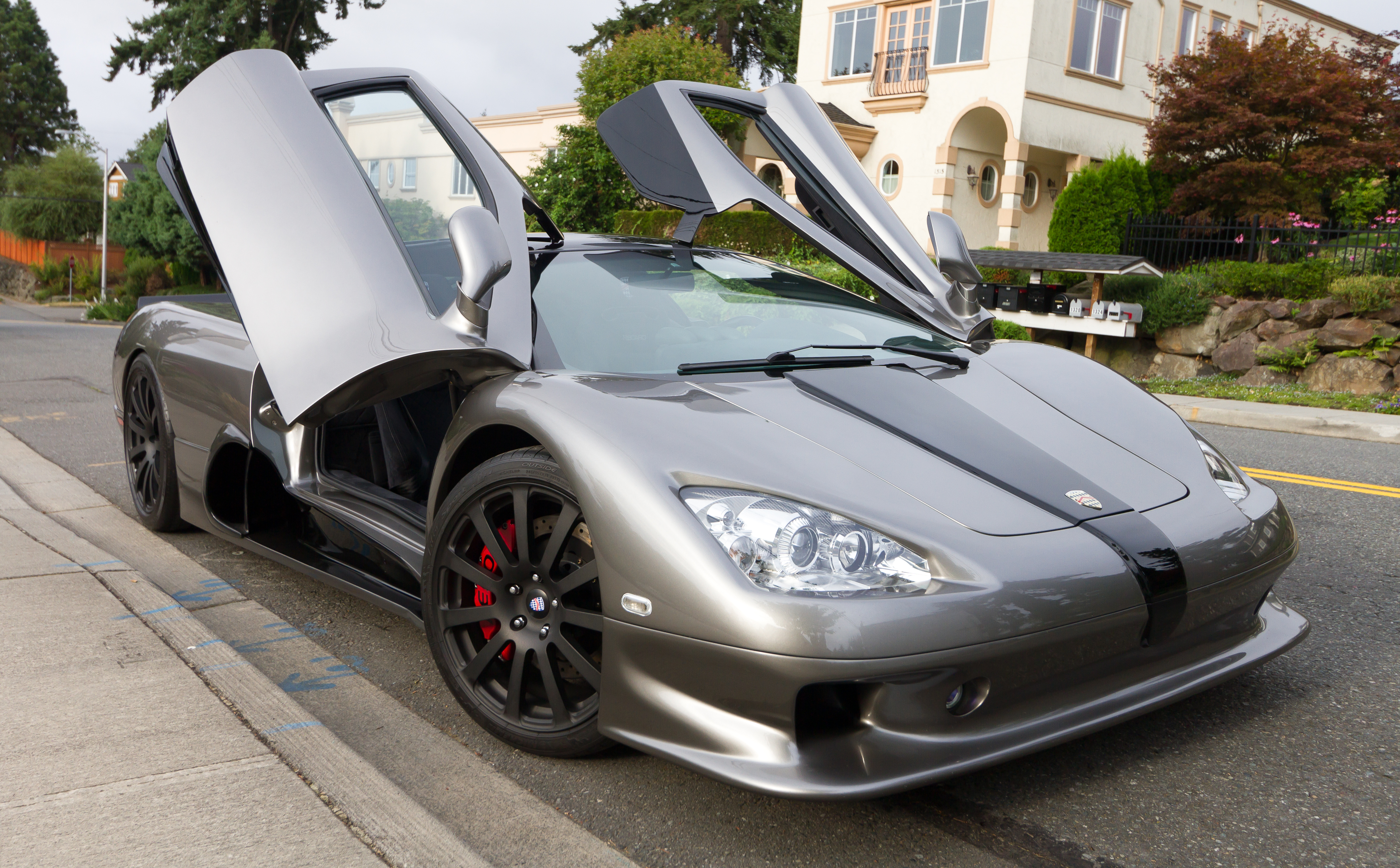
SSC Ultimate Aero TT

The first prototype SSC Ultimate Aero was completed in 2004. The two original prototypes were equipped with a supercharged 377.6 cu in (6,188 cc) Chevrolet Corvette C5R V8 engine. The supercharged engines originally produced 782 horsepower but were eventually modified to produce up to 908 horsepower with theoretical top speeds of up to 242 mph (390 km/h).

Following the original two prototypes, SSC replaced the supercharged engine with a new twin-turbo V8 that eventually produced 1,287 horsepower. The twin-turbo setup can be found in the majority of the SSC Ultimate Aeros produced. On September 13, 2007, the Ultimate Aero became the world's fastest production car as certified by Guinness World Records with a top speed of 256.18 mph averaged over two runs in opposite directions.

=== SSC Ultimate Aero XT ===
In 2013, SSC North America announced they were going to produce a limited number of SSC Ultimate Aero XTs. This vehicle was an upgraded Ultimate Aero and included many features from the Tuatara (Concept). These features include a 1,300 horsepower version of the Tuatara twin-turbocharged V8, a 7-speed Tuatara paddle shifter transmission, and upgraded cooling, fuel, and braking systems.

=== SSC Tuatara ===
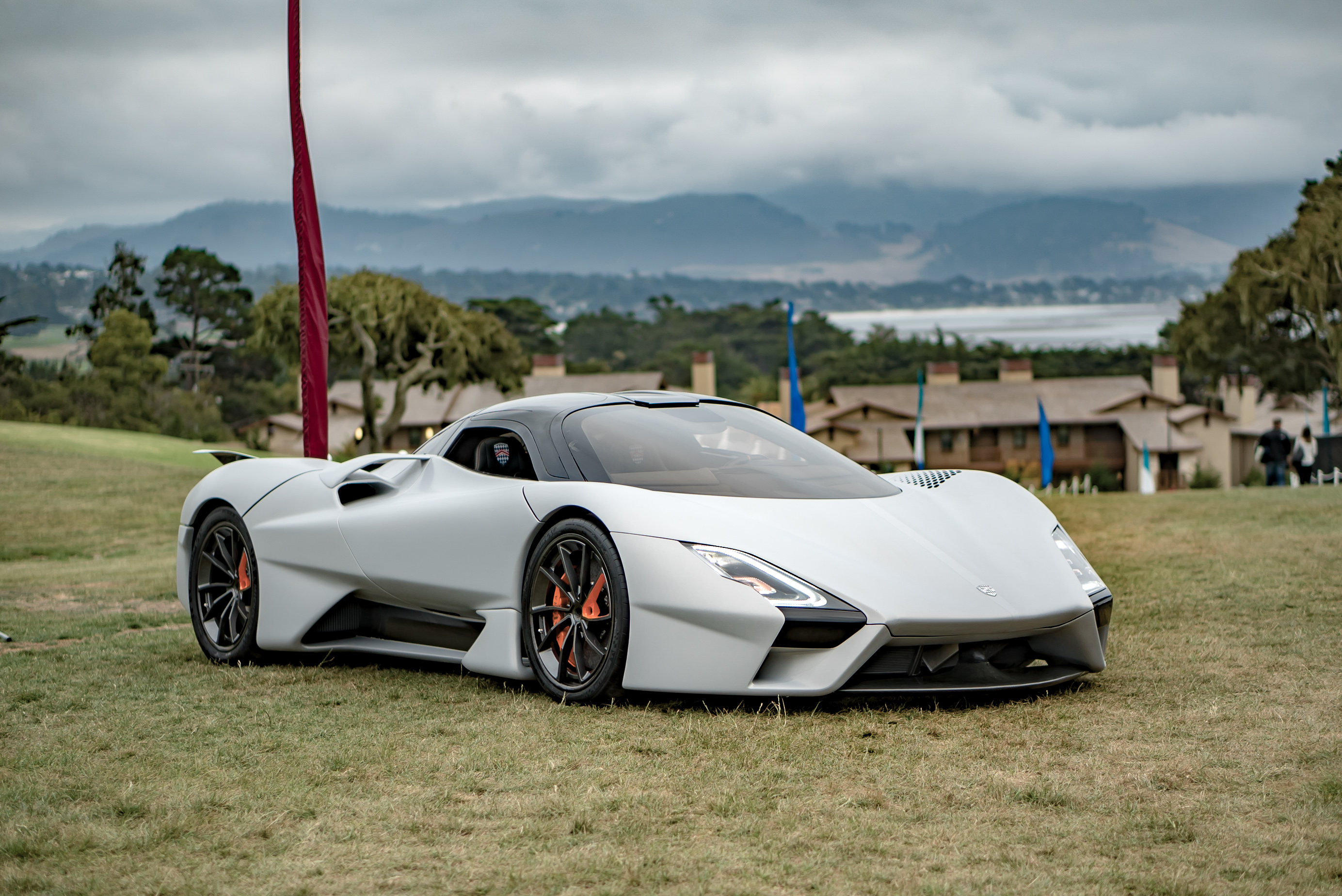
2019 SSC Tuatara prototype

The SSC Tuatara is currently in production at the SSC North America assembly facility in Richland, Washington. The vehicle is the result of a design collaboration between Jason Castriota and SSC North America and was titled the "Crown Jewel" of the 2011 Dubai International Motor Show. The car made its debut at the 2020 Philadelphia Auto Show. The vehicle is limited to 100 examples. On October 10, 2020, driver Oliver Webb allegedly broke the production car speed record in the SSC Tuatara with a top speed of 331.15 miles per hour and a 2-way average of 316.11 mph on a closed public roadway with street tires and non-race fuel. The claim, however, has since been disputed by several sources who analyzed the video and information given from SSC North America and have since made claims that the top speed run was illegitimate. On January 17, 2021, Tuatara owner and non-professional driver Larry Caplin officially broke the speed record for fastest production vehicle with an average 2-way average speed of 282.9 mph on a 2.5 mile stretch of runway at Kennedy Space Center's Shuttle Landing Facility. The claim was verified by Race Logic, with a technician onsite to install and analyze the data. SSC has stated that it plans on continuing high speed testing to validate the top speed of the Tuatara and hopes to be the first production car to reach and surpass 300 mph.

== Facilities ==
SSC North America is based in Richland, Washington, where its assembly facility and corporate offices are located.
