= SSC Ultimate Aero =

American sportscar manufactured by SSC North America

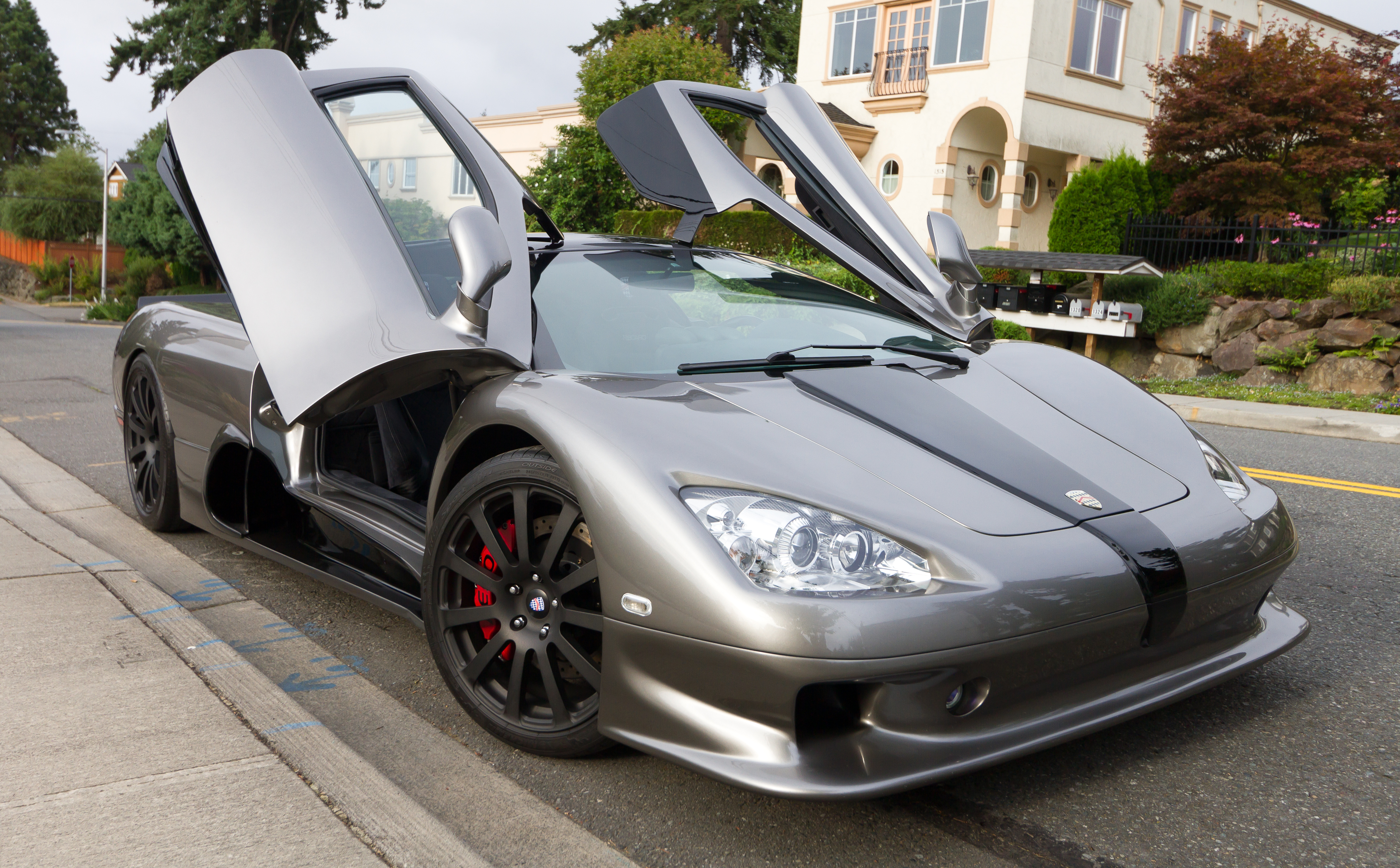

Overview
- Manufacturer: SSC North America
- Production: 2004–2013
- Assembly: United States: Richland, Washington

Body and chassis
- Class: Sports car (S)
- Body style: 2-door coupé
- Layout: Rear mid-engine, rear-wheel-drive
- Doors: Butterfly

Powertrain
- Engine: General Motors LS-based small-block based; 2004: 6,200 cc supercharged V8; 2005: 6,300 cc supercharged V8; 2006: 6,300 cc supercharged V8; 2007: 6,300 cc twin-turbocharged V8; SSC designed; 2009: 6,300 cc twin-turbocharged V8; 2013: 6,900 cc twin-turbocharged V8
- Electric motor: 2 liquid-cooled electric motors (Ultimate Aero EV)
- Transmission: 3-speed automatic (for EV only); 5-speed manual (for SC/8T only); 6-speed manual (for TT only); 7-speed automated manual (for XT only)

Dimensions
- Length: 4,475 mm (176.2 in)
- Width: 2,100 mm (82.7 in)
- Height: 1,092 mm (43.0 in)
- Kerb weight: 1,270–1,292 kg (2,800–2,848 lb)

Chronology
- Successor: SSC Tuatara

The SSC Ultimate Aero is a mid-engined sports car that was produced by SSC North America (formerly known as Shelby SuperCars) from 2004 until 2013. The SSC Ultimate Aero held the world production car speed record title, according to the Guinness World Records, from 2007 (when it was officially timed at 255 mph, 410 km/h) until the introduction of the Bugatti Veyron Super Sport in 2010. In April 2013, the Guinness World Records temporarily disqualified the Veyron's record time for a period of five days due to concerns about electronic speed limiting changing the function of the car, but after investigation reinstated the Veyron as the record holder.

The SSC Ultimate Aero was not sold with electronic driver aids such as an anti-lock braking system or traction control system, as according to Jerod Shelby (no relation to Carroll Shelby), "Early design philosophy on the car was to make it a driver's car. I wanted a car that you not only throttled with your right foot but at times you could steer with your right foot and a sensor."

== History ==
=== SSC Aero SC/8T Number 1 (2004) ===
The first SSC Aero prototype was completed in 2004 and began road testing in anticipation of the SSC Ultimate Aero production vehicle.

Specifications:

- Engine - Supercharged 6,187 cc (377.6 cu in) LS1-based V8
- Power - 679 kW (911 hp) at 6,600 rpm
- Torque - 1,045 N⋅m (771 lb⋅ft) at 5,800 rpm
- Redline - 7200 rpm
- Top speed - 401 km/h (249 mph) (claimed)
- Dry weight - 1,230 kg (2,712 lb)

=== SSC Ultimate Aero SC/8T Number 2 (2005) ===
Wind tunnel testing indicated that the Ultimate Aero could theoretically reach a top speed of 275 mph (443 km/h) given appropriate transmission gear ratios, although the supplied transmission would result in 268 mph (431 km/h) at the car's redline. The base Aero, however, had a theoretical top speed of about 234 mph (377 km/h). The Ultimate Aero accelerates from 0–62 mph (100 km/h) in 2.78 seconds, slower than the Bugatti Veyron which achieves 0–100 km/h in 2.46 seconds, partially due to its AWD drivetrain.

Specifications:

- Engine - Supercharged 6,300 cc Chevrolet Corvette C5-R V8
- Power - 590 kW (791 hp) at 6600 rpm
- Torque - 1,000 N⋅m (738 lb⋅ft) at 5800 rpm
- Redline - 7200 rpm
- Max Speed - 377 km/h (234 mph)
- Dry weight - 1,300 kg (2,866 lb)

=== 2006 ===
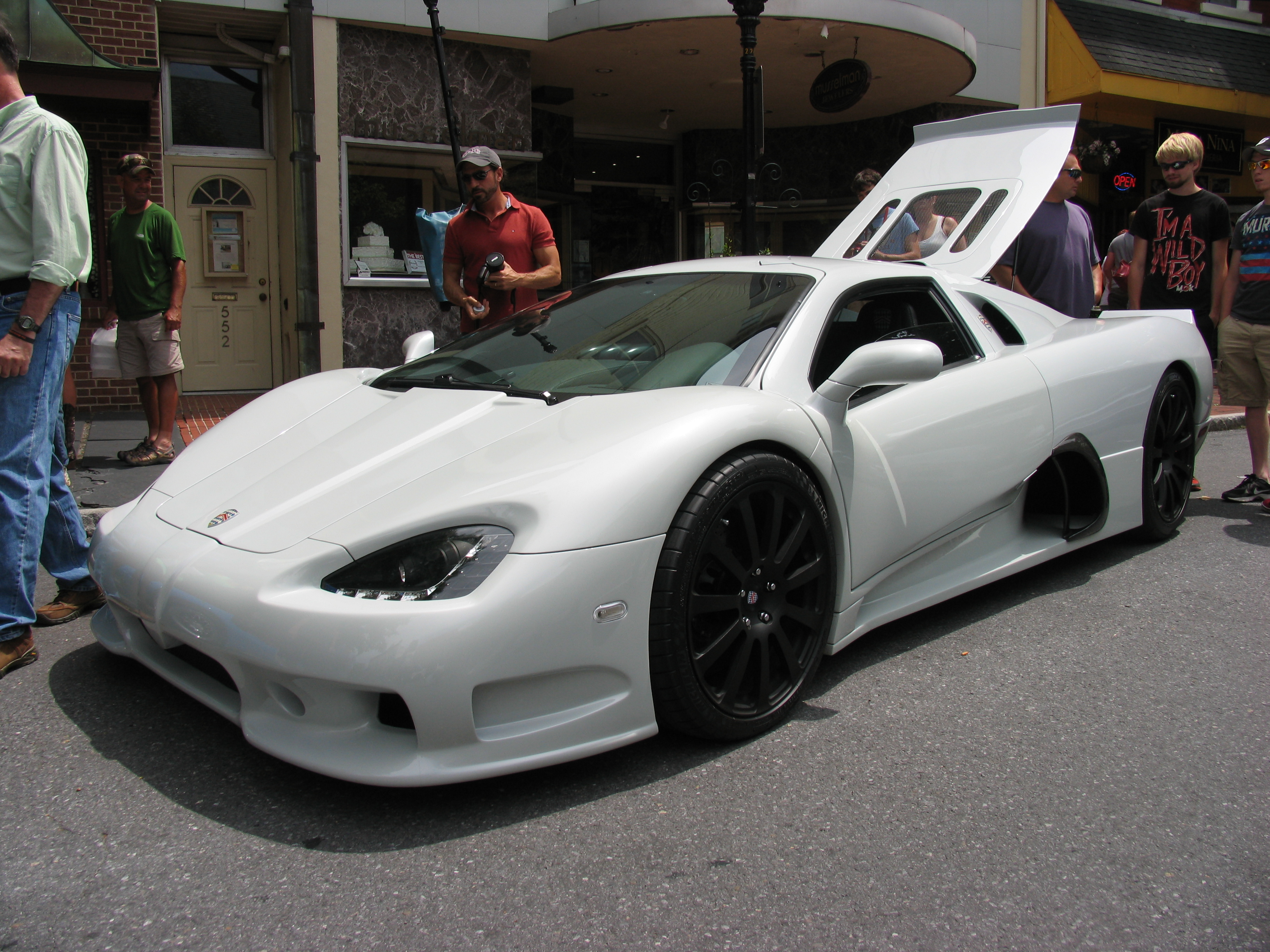
SSC Ultimate Aero TT

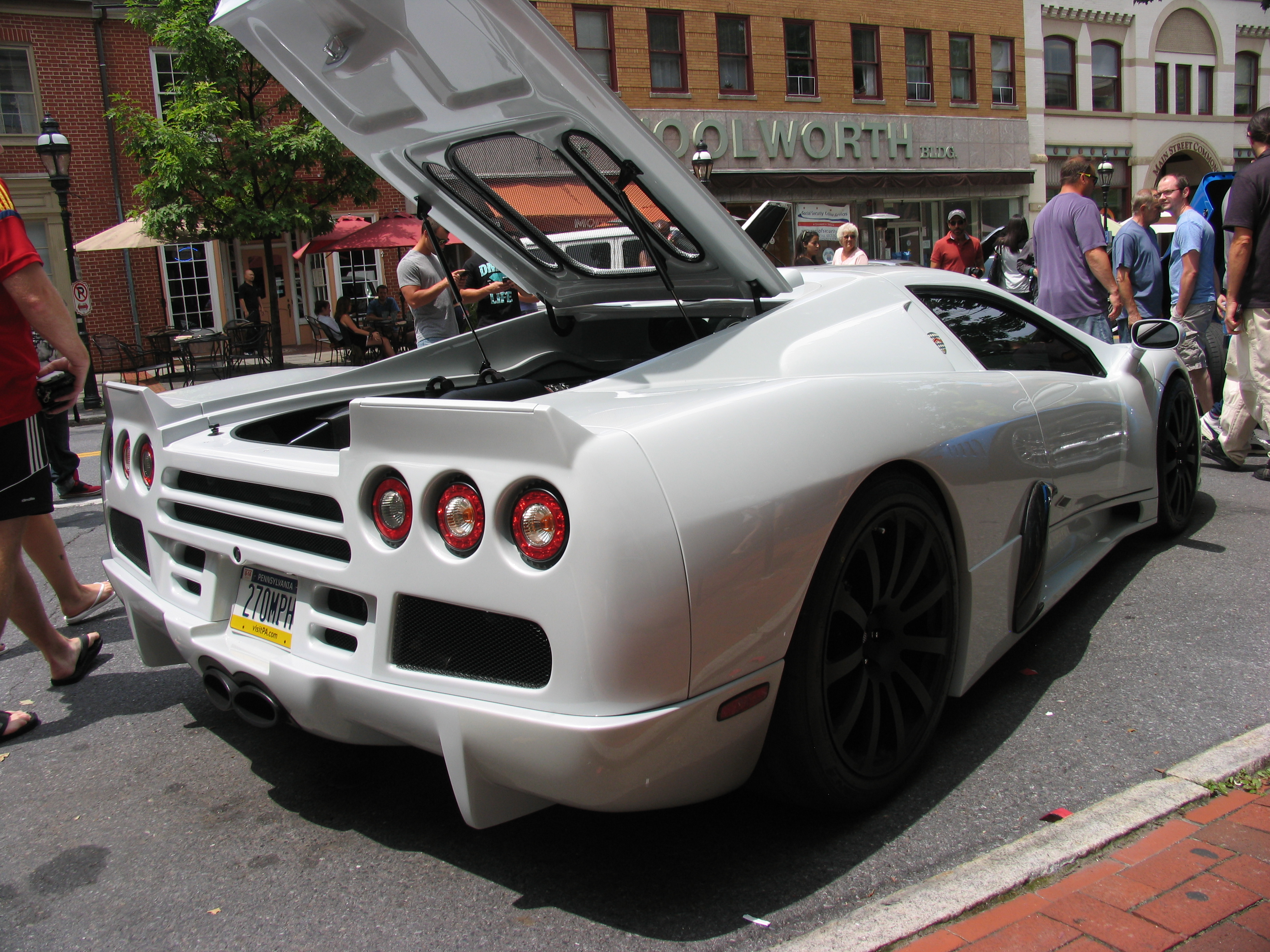
SSC Ultimate Aero TT rear view

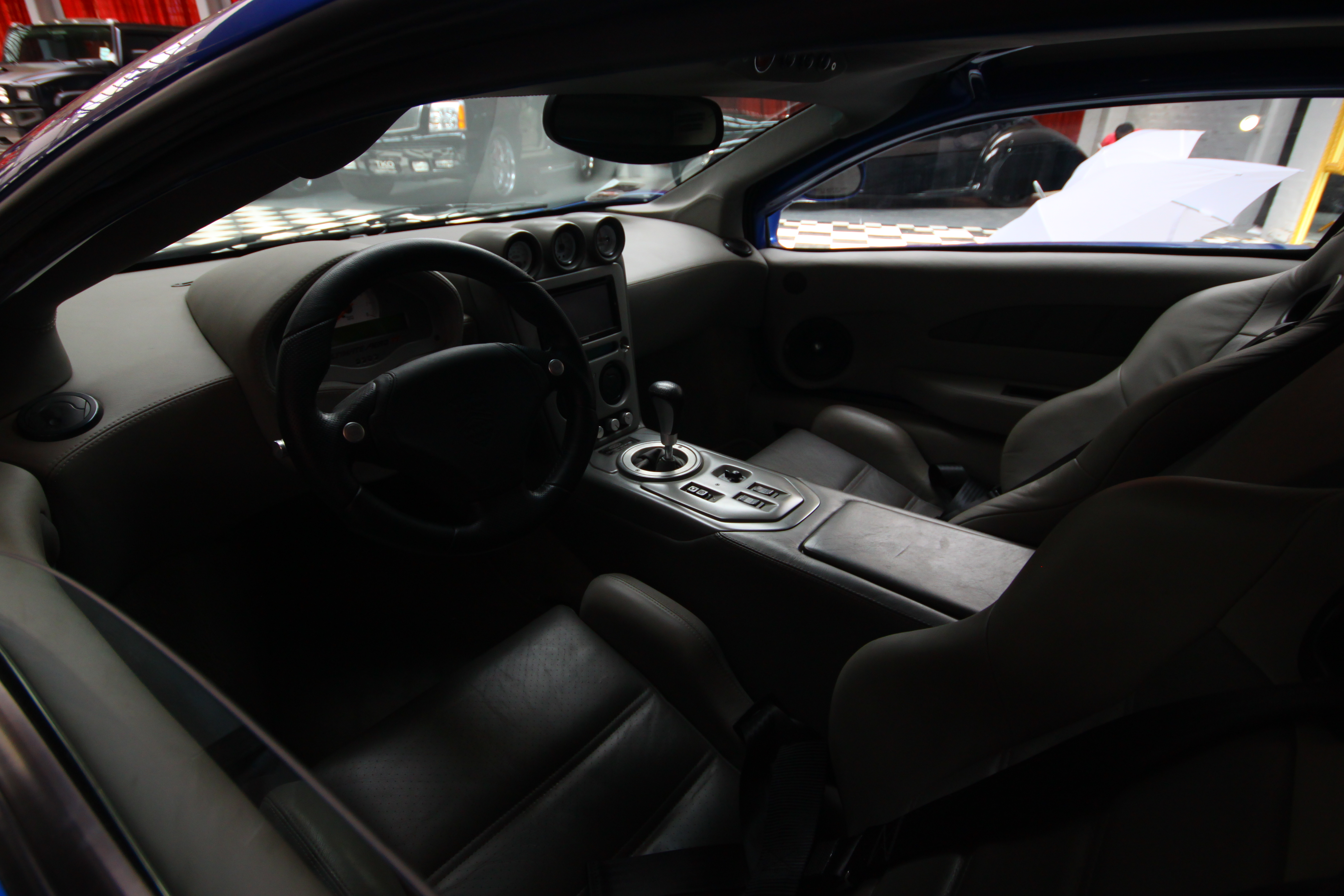
SSC Ultimate Aero TT interior

Styling of the Aero includes the use of butterfly doors similar to those found on the McLaren F1 and Ferrari Enzo. Carbon fibre and titanium are used throughout the car, helping to limit the weight to 1,300 kg (2,866 lb) for the standard Aero. The SSC Ultimate Aero was the final version of the prototype, introduced in 2006. It had an increased engine displacement of 6,300 cc and increased boost to 100 kPa.

Specifications:

- Engine: supercharged 6,300 cc Chevrolet Corvette C5-R V8
- Power: 780 kW (1,046 hp) at 6950 rpm
- Torque: 1,113 N⋅m (821 lb⋅ft) at 6200 rpm
- Redline: 7200 rpm
- Top speed: 400 km/h (249 mph)
- Dry weight: 1,200 kg (2,646 lb)

=== 2007–2008 ===
The Ultimate Aero TT was a twin-turbocharged version of the Ultimate Aero. The 6-speed transmission was readjusted to increase the theoretical top speed to 440 km/h (273 mph) at 7200 rpm. Wheels on the base model are sized 460 mm (18.1 in) at the front and 480 mm (18.9 in) at the rear, while the Ultimate Aero TT has wheels an inch larger at each end. The 2007 models are heavier, with the base model weighing 1,300 kg (2,866 lb), and Ultimate version 1,250 kg (2,756 lb). Unlike the previous year, base models have a navigation system, 10-speaker audio/CD/DVD system, video/DVD screen, back-up camera, air-conditioning, and trunk space as standard equipment. These come optional on the Ultimate. The first production 2007 Ultimate Aero TT car was sold on eBay for US$431,100. Later cars are expected to cost US$285,000. Only 24 Ultimate Aero TTs were produced from 2006 to 2007. The Ultimate Aero TT made its international debut on the International Show Circuit in November 2006. The Ultimate Aero TT claimed the Guinness World Records for the fastest production car, after it was officially timed at 410 km/h (255 mph) in Washington. For 2008, the Ultimate Aero received four updates:

- New twin-turbocharged V8
- New aluminium engine block
- Standard HRE monoblock wheels
- Azentek Atlas computer infotainment system

Specifications:

- Engine - twin-turbocharged 6,300 cc bored-out LS6
- Power - 880 kW (1,180 hp) at 6950 rpm
- Torque - 1,303 N⋅m (961 ft⋅lb) at 6150 rpm
- Redline - 7200 rpm
- Top speed - 412.28 km/h (256.18 mph)
- Dry weight - 1,250 kg (2,756 lb)

=== SSC Ultimate Aero TT ===
In 2009, SSC updated the Ultimate Aero TT, with the new version having an increase in power of 15% over the older model. SSC predicts a top speed of over 430 km/h (267 mph) is possible. In order to prevent the engine from overheating, airflow to the engine has been increased 20% with new carbon fibre louvres. The nose has been redesigned to make the car more aerodynamic, and the interior has been redesigned. The new Aero also has a new AeroBrake system, which is a spoiler which rises up to 200 mm (7.9 in) when the brake is pressed. This updated model reached a top speed of 415 km/h (258 mph) in a test, according to SSC.

Specifications:

- Engine: twin-turbocharged 6,300 cc SSC V8
- Power: 960 kW (1,287 hp) at 6100 rpm
- Torque: 1,500 N⋅m (1,106 lbf⋅ft) at 6100 rpm
- Redline: 7200 rpm
- Top speed: 414 km/h (257 mph)
- Dry weight: 1,250 kg (2,756 lb)

A 2009 SSC Ultimate Aero, albeit with the new prototype SSC Tuatara gearbox fitted, was able to complete six runs of 0–300 km/h (186 mph) from 15.1 to 15.8 seconds, according to SSC's gear ratio testing results.

=== SSC Ultimate Aero EV ===
In 2009, SSC announced that they would be commencing production of the Ultimate Aero EV, an electrically powered version of the Ultimate Aero. This car featured twin electric motors, claimed to be capable of producing 746 kW (1,000 hp) and 1,085 N⋅m (800 ft⋅lb) of torque through a three-speed automatic transmission. SSC claimed that the car would be able to accelerate from 0–97 km/h (60 mph) in 2.5 seconds, and reach a top speed of 335 km/h (208 mph). However, the car never entered production.

=== 2013 ===
In 2013, SSC introduced the Ultimate Aero XT, which was a special version of the Ultimate Aero that was built to celebrate the end of its production. Five XTs were planned, but only one was built. They utilised some components that were designed for its Tuatara replacement; for example, the Ultimate Aero XT was fitted with SSC's new 6.9-litre all-aluminium twin-turbocharged V8 engine and a seven-speed paddle-shifted gearbox.

Specifications

- Engine: twin-turbocharged 6,900 cc SSC V8
- Power: 950 kW (1,300 hp) at 6800 rpm
- Torque: 1,361 N⋅m (1,004 ft⋅lb) at 6800 rpm
- Redline: 9100 rpm
- Top speed (theoretical) - 431 km/h (268 mph)
- Top speed (actual): 414 km/h (257 mph)
- Drag coefficient: Cd=0.357
- Dry weight: 1,270 kg (2,800 lb)
- Kerb weight: 1,300 kg (2,866 lb)

== Speed record ==
Simulation and testing at NASA's Langley Research Center had shown the Ultimate Aero TT theoretically capable of attaining about 440 km/h (273 mph), sufficient to surpass the production car record-holding Bugatti Veyron's 407 km/h (253 mph).

A 19 km (12-mile) stretch of Route 93 was closed on March 21, 2007, to allow SSC to test the Ultimate Aero TT, but the attempt was called off due to bad weather, and an effort the following day failed due to sub-optimal conditions, with test driver Rick Doria reporting wheelspin at speeds above 305 km/h (190 mph).

Six months later SSC announced they had established a new production car speed record of 412.28 km/h (256 mph) in West Richland, Washington on September 13, 2007. In accordance with FIA Speed Records rules it was an average of two runs in opposite directions, 414.31 km/h (257 mph) and 410.24 km/h (255 mph). The results were verified by the Guinness World Records on October 9, 2007. SSC is currently one of only twenty-six car manufacturers in history to have held the record.

SSC also applied to Guinness for the world record for the highest power for an emissions-legal production car.

Its record was broken on July 4, 2010, by the Bugatti Veyron Super Sport, which reached a certified top speed of 430 km/h (267 mph).

== See also ==
- List of production cars by power output
