= Isotta Fraschini Tipo KM =

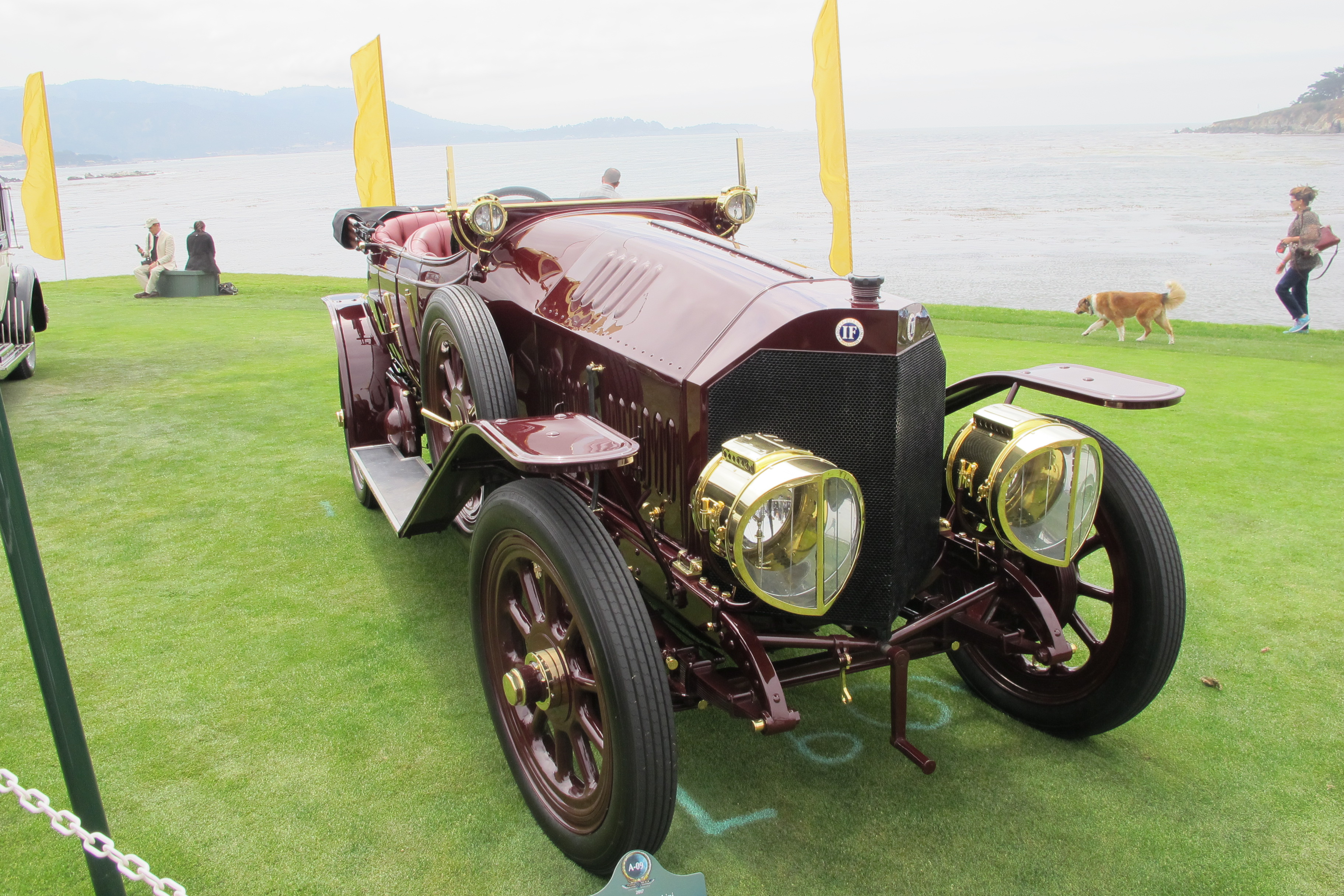
- An Isotta-Fraschini Tipo KM4 Tourer on display at the 2017 Pebble Beach Concours d'Elegance

Overview
- Manufacturer: Isotta Fraschini
- Production: 1910–1914
- Assembly: Milan, Italy

Body and chassis
- Class: Luxury car
- Layout: FR layout

Powertrain
- Engine: 10.6-liter OHC I4

The Isotta Fraschini Tipo KM is a luxury car produced between 1910 and 1914 in Italy. Only 50 were built. Many of those 50 examples were exported to the United States, where the company had a branch on New York's Broadway.

The KM was introduced in Paris in 1910. It was one of the most powerful cars at that time. It has a 10.6 litre engine, with power transferred via chain. It has brakes on all four wheels, and a system developed by Oreste Fraschini allows for using front or rear brakes individually.

There were two engine options -Italian 100/120 hp or American 140 hp, top speed 130 km/h or 160 km/h with the American option being more powerful.

== Engine ==
The engine was an advanced single overhead camshaft four, benefiting company's experience in the new technology of aeroengine design and manufacture, with bi-block cylinders, four big valves per cylinder and lightweight construction. The engine of the Tipo KM, developed 120 hp (89 kW) at 1600 rpm, had a bore and stroke of 130 x 200mm (5.12x7.87 in), liberally-drilled pistons of the finest BND Derihon steel that weighed less than 32 ounces (907 grams) and tubular BND conrods 16 inches (410 mm) long that tipped the scales at just 7 lb (3,1 kg).

== Performance ==
Pioneer motor racer Charles Jarrott named the 100-hp Isotta Fraschini as ‘tops’ of the pre-1914 sports cars. Performance was in keeping with the price demanded: in 1913 the famed racing driver Ray Gilhooley lapped the Indianapolis Brickyard oval in 1 minute 52 seconds, six seconds faster than the average of that year's “500” winner, at the wheel of a stock-bodied 1912 Tipo KM complete with windshield, spare tires and fenders, and with four passengers aboard.

== See also ==
- Timeline of most powerful production cars
