= SSC Tuatara =

High performance sports car produced by SSC North America

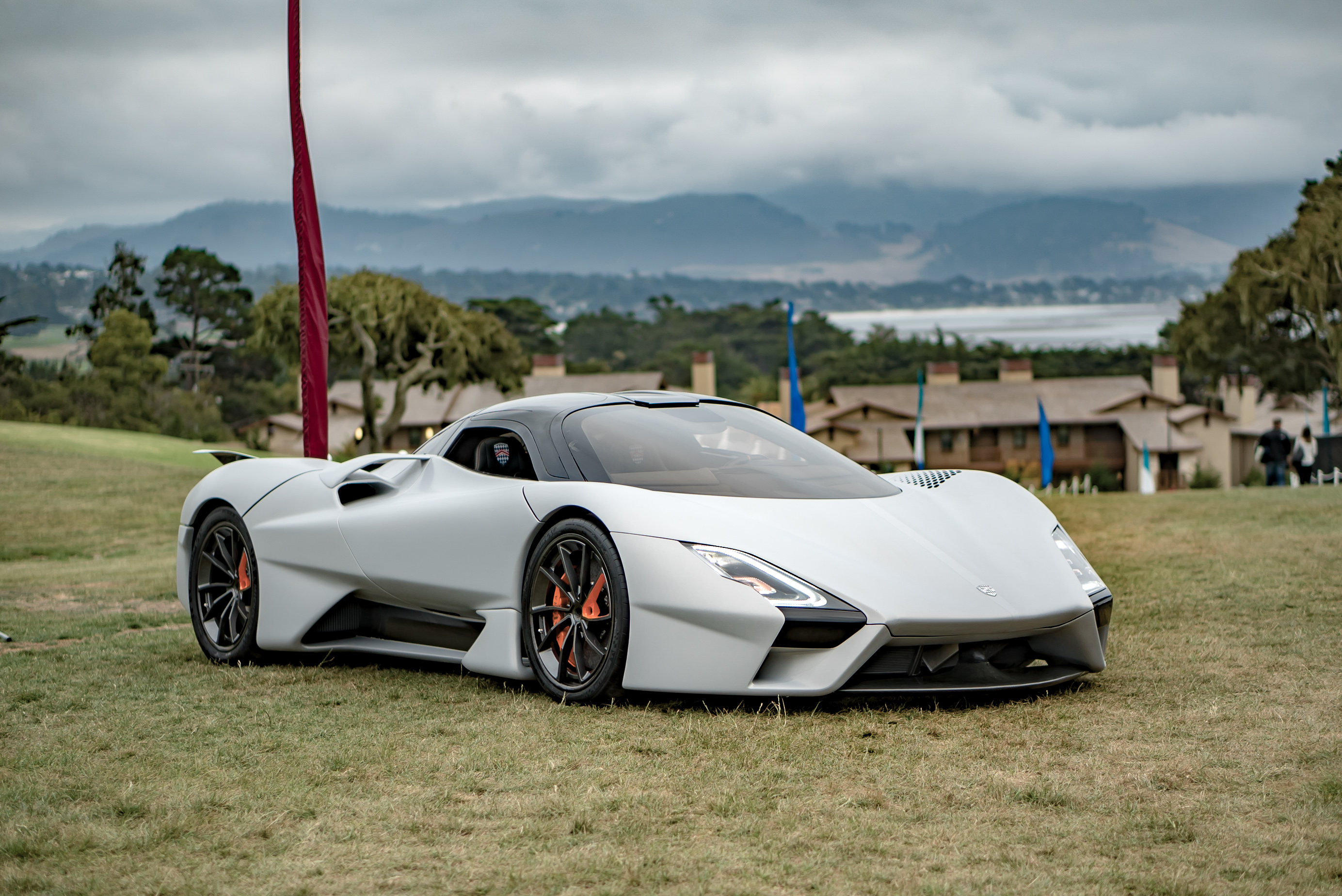

Overview
- Manufacturer: SSC North America
- Production: 2020–present (100 units planned)
- Assembly: United States: Richland, Washington
- Designer: Jason Castriota

Body and chassis
- Class: Sports car (S)
- Body style: 2-door coupé
- Layout: Rear mid-engine, rear-wheel-drive
- Doors: Butterfly

Powertrain
- Engine: 5.9 L (360.8 cu in) SSC Twin-Turbo flat-plane crank V8
- Power output: 1,350 hp (1,000 kW) (91 octane); 1,750 hp (1,300 kW) (E85 flex fuel); 2,200 hp (1,650 kW) (Methanol, Non-Street Legal Upgrade)
- Transmission: 7-speed CIMA automated manual

Dimensions
- Wheelbase: 105.2 in (2,672 mm)
- Length: 182.4 in (4,633 mm)
- Width: 81.3 in (2,065 mm)
- Height: 42.0 in (1,067 mm)
- Curb weight: 2,750 lb (1,247 kg) (dry)

Chronology
- Predecessor: SSC Ultimate Aero

The SSC Tuatara /tuəˈtɑːrə/ is a sports car designed, developed and manufactured by American automobile manufacturer SSC North America (formerly Shelby SuperCars Inc.). The car is the successor to the Ultimate Aero and is the result of a design collaboration between Jason Castriota and SSC. Initially powered by a 6.9-liter twin-turbocharged V8 engine, the capacity of the engine was later reduced to 5.9 L (360.8 cu in) in order to allow the engine to have a higher redline of 8,800 rpm. SSC had stated that the power output would be rated at 1,350 hp (1,000 kW) or 1,750 hp (1,300 kW) on E85 fuel, along with a 300 mph (483 km/h)+ top speed.

== Design and development ==
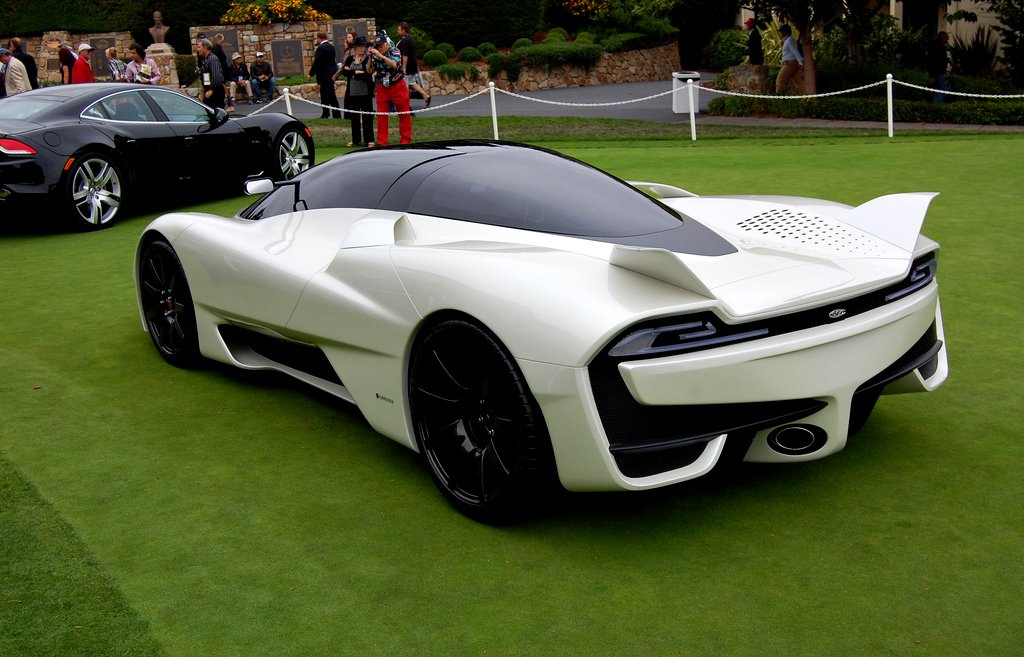
SSC Tuatara concept

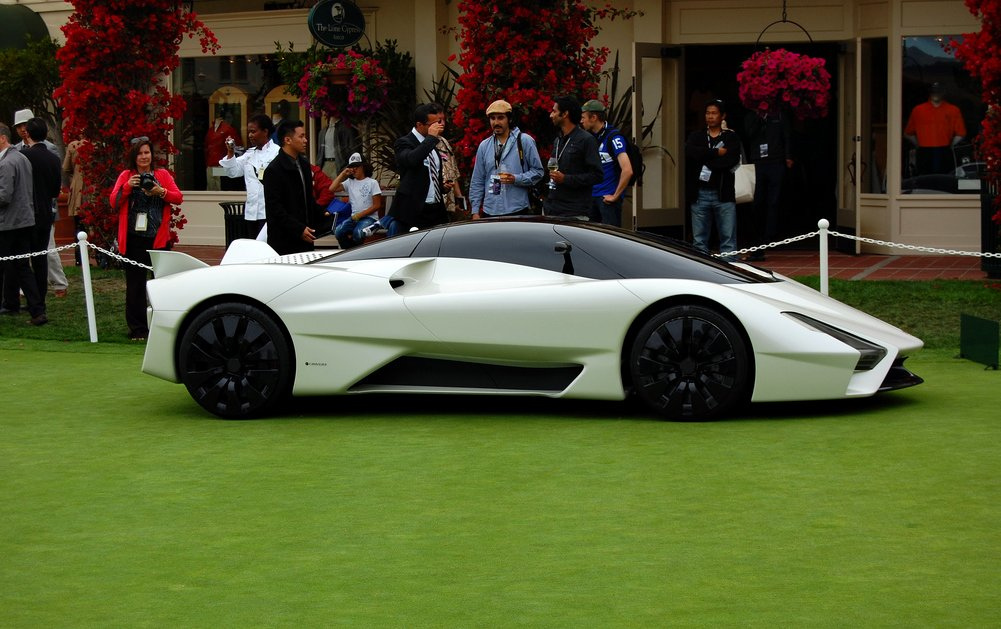
SSC Tuatara Side View.

SSC began working on the development of the successor of the SSC Ultimate Aero in 2011. The new car named the Tuatara was previewed in concept form at the 2011 Pebble Beach Concours d'Elegance. In August 2018, seven years after the debut of the concept, the production version of the Tuatara was shown to the general public. Designed by ex-Pininfarina designer Jason Castriota, the car takes inspiration from the aerospace industry.

The Tuatara is named after the reptile, found only in New Zealand, known for having the fastest molecular evolution of any living animal.

== Interior ==
The interior contains leather and Alcantara upholstery and the functions of the car are controlled through a touch screen located on the center console. There is a configurable instrument panel behind the steering wheel displaying important information about the car's status along with a 300 mph (483 km/h) speedometer. The car uses a camera system instead of traditional side-view mirrors. SSC claims that the interior can seat a 6-foot-5-inch (1.96 m) tall person wearing a helmet.

== Exterior ==
The car has a carbon-fiber body construction with aluminum crumple zones and incorporates active aerodynamics.

== Performance ==
SSC claims the Tuatara has the lowest drag coefficient in its class at Cd=0.279.

SSC has partnered with Nelson Racing Engines to build the engine, Linder Power Systems for engine sub-assembly fabrication, and Automac for production of the 7-speed automated manual transmission. The transmission was later revealed to be a 7-speed automated manual manufactured by CIMA. The engine is based on the architecture of a General Motors small-block V8 engine but uses proprietary parts only, including the block which is cast by Nelson. As of November 2026, SSC and Nelson Racing Engines have not specified whether it is an OHV, SOHC, or DOHC engine.

The car has the following driving modes: "Sport", "Track" and "Lift". In Sport mode, the ride height is 4 inches (102 mm) at the front and 4.5 inches (114 mm) at the rear. In Track mode, the ride height lowers to 2.75 inches (70 mm) at the front and 3.75 inches (95 mm) at the rear. The Lift mode is designed to protect the underbody of the car while driving over speed bumps or driveways.

== Production ==
The Tuatara is produced at a purpose-built facility in Richland, Washington, and production is limited to 100 cars.

== World record attempts ==
On October 10, 2020, the Tuatara – according to SSC (pending independent confirmation) – claimed a disputed production car top speed record, recording a one-way top speed of 331.15 mph (532.93 km/h) and a two-way average of 316.11 mph (508.73 km/h) on a seven-mile stretch of temporarily closed Nevada State Route 160 near Pahrump, outside of Las Vegas. SSC claims that this speed beat the Koenigsegg Agera RS's record, which set a record on the same highway in 2017, by 46.6 mph (75.0 km/h). British racing driver Oliver Webb piloted the car. In a video on the SSC North America YouTube channel uploaded October 30, 2020, SSC's founder Jerod Shelby stated that the run had been ruined after they started seeing some doubts, and the only way to fix them was to re-run the top speed in the near future. SSC released a statement on July 21, 2021 stating that the initial record attempt did not reach over 300 mph (483 km/h).

On January 17, 2021, the Tuatara achieved a speed of 279.7 mph (450.1 km/h) during its northbound run and 286.1 mph (460.4 km/h) during its southbound with a two-way average of 282.9 mph (455.3 km/h) over the course of 2.3 miles (3.7 km) at Space Florida's Launch and Landing Facility. American dentist and entrepreneur Larry Caplin, owner of the car, piloted it during the run, which was verified with multiple satellite tracking systems from Racelogic, Life Racing, Garmin, and IMRA.

In April 2021 while traveling back to Florida to reattempt the speed record, the Tuatara was damaged after its trailer flipped over due to high winds in Utah.

On May 14, 2022, Larry Caplin’s Tuatara reached a one-way speed of 295 mph (475 km/h) over the course of 2.3 miles (3.7 km) at Space Florida's Launch and Landing Facility. This was verified by two Racelogic VBOX GNSS and a Life Racing GPS speed measurement systems, as well as a Racelogic technician on hand.

== Model variants ==
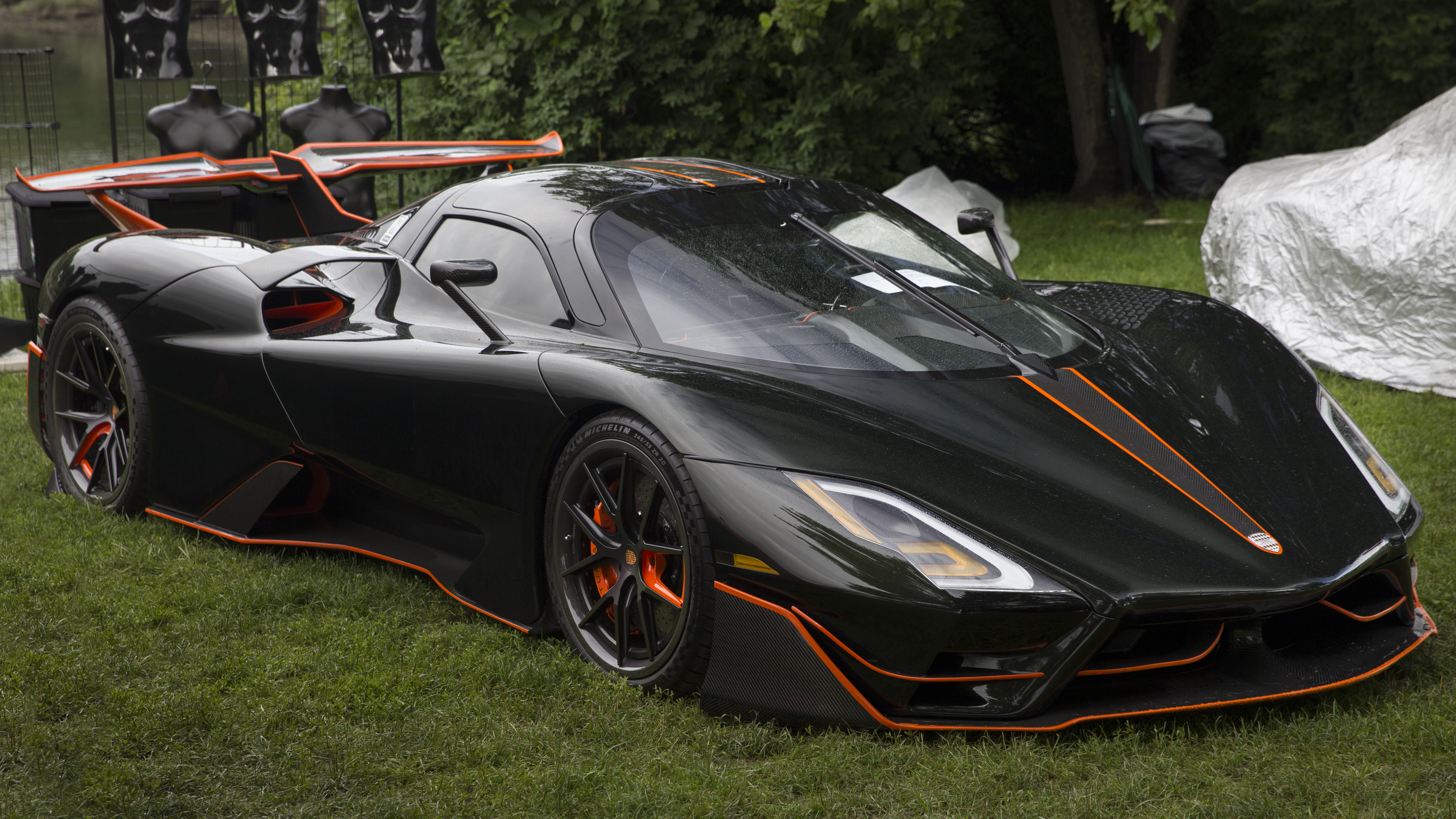
2024 SSC Tuatara Striker

In May, 2020, SSC North America announced a soft reveal of two Tuatara variants that focused on track abilities.

=== Tuatara Striker ===
The Tuatara Striker features additional aerodynamic components that increases downforce for track handling.

=== Tuatara Aggressor ===
The Tuatara Aggressor has the same body style as the Striker, but allows the customer to choose from non-road legal options, such as racing seats and a 2,200 hp (1,650 kW) engine upgrade.

== Specifications ==
	SSC Tuatara	Tuatara Striker	Tuatara Aggressor
Production	100 units combined		10 units
Engine	5.9 L (360.8 cu in) V8, twin-turbo		
Bore x stroke	4.125 in × 3.375 in (104.8 mm × 85.7 mm)		
Transmission	CIMA 7-Speed robotized manual		
Power (Horsepower)	1,350 hp (1,000 kW) 91 Octane; 1,750 hp (1,300 kW) E85		2,200 hp (1,650 kW) Option
Torque	984 lb⋅ft (1,350 N⋅m) 91 Octane; 1,322 lb⋅ft (1,800 N⋅m) E85		1,604 lb⋅ft (2,150 N⋅m) Option
Aerodynamics	Cd=0.279	1,100 lb (500 kg) downforce	
0–60 mph (0–97 km/h)	2.5 sec	TBA	TBA
60–120 mph (97–193 km/h)	2.5 sec	TBA	TBA

== "Little Brother" project ==
CEO Jerod Shelby has shared limited information about a "Little Brother" supercar in early development that will decrease the price-point of a Tuatara-related vehicle to make it available to a larger market.

== See also ==
- List of production cars by power output
