= List of production car speed records =

This is a list of the world's record-breaking top speeds achieved by street-legal production cars (as opposed to concept cars or modified cars). For the purposes of this list eligible cars are defined in the below list of rules. This list uses a different definition to the List of automotive superlatives. The variation is because the term production car is otherwise undefined.

== List rules ==
Because of the inconsistencies with the various definitions of production cars, dubious claims by manufacturers and self-interest groups, and inconsistent or changing application of the definitions this list has a defined set of requirements. For further explanation of how these were arrived at see the talk pages of both this article and the above link. After the Koenigsegg Agera RS was found not eligible for this list since only 11 cars had engines rated higher than 865 kW, the former 25 car minimum was dropped and replaced with new rules based on suggestions by Koenigsegg PR manager Steven Wade.

=== Post 1945 and over 200 km/h (124 mph) only ===
This list is also limited to post World War II production road cars which reached more than 200 km/h (124 mph), older cars are excluded even if they were faster. The Benz Velo as the first petrol driven car is the only exception.

=== Production car definition ===
For the purposes of this list, a production car is defined as a vehicle that is:

1. Constructed principally for retail sale to consumers, for their personal use, to transport people on public roads (no commercial or industrial vehicles are eligible)
2. Available for commercial sale to the public in the same specification as the vehicle used to achieve the record
3. Manufactured in the record-claiming specification by a manufacturer whose WMI number is shown on the VIN, including vehicles that are modified by either professional tuners or others that result in a VIN with a WMI number in their name (for example, cars manufactured by RUF with Porsche parts and RUF's WMI W09 are eligible; cars modified by them with Porsche's WMI, WP0, aren't)
4. Pre-1981 vehicles must be made by the original vehicle manufacturer and not modified by either professional tuners or individuals
5. Sold in more than one national market.

=== Measurement of top speed ===
To establish the top speed for cars the requirement is, in addition to the above, an independent road test with a two-way run. The mean of the top speed for both runs is taken as the car's top speed. In instances where the top speed has been determined by removing the limiter, the test met these requirements, and the car is sold with the limiter on then the limited speed is accepted as meeting this requirement. For the McLaren F1 the estimation by Car and Driver about the speed at the rev-limiter is used.

== Record-breaking production vehicles ==
Year	Make and model	Top speed	Engine	Number built	Comment
1894	Benz Velo	20 km/h (12 mph)	1,045 cc (63.8 cu in) single-cylinder 1.1 kW (1.5 PS; 1.5 bhp)	1,200	First production car. It does not meet the list criteria.
1949	Jaguar XK120	200.5 km/h (124.6 mph)	3,442 cc (210.0 cu in) inline-6 119 kW (162 PS; 160 hp)	12,061	Some publications cite the XK120's timed top speed as almost 214 km/h (133 mph) in 1949. The XK120 that achieved this speed had a tonneau over the passenger seat and an aero screen fitted. When in completely standard form, the car reached 200.5 km/h (124.6 mph) when tested by Motor.
1955	Mercedes-Benz 300 SL	242.5 km/h (150.7 mph)	2,996 cc (182.8 cu in) inline-6 158 kW (215 PS; 212 hp)	1,400	Two-way average speed tested by Automobil Revue in 1958. 245 km/h (152.2 mph) reached in one direction.
1959	Aston Martin DB4 GT	245.4 km/h (152.5 mph)	3,670 cc (224 cu in) inline-6 225 kW (306 PS; 302 hp)	75	Tested by Autosport in December 1961.
1963	Iso Grifo GL 365	259 km/h (161 mph)	5,354 cc (326.7 cu in) V8 268 kW (365 PS; 360 hp)	over 400	Tested by Autocar in 1966. A total of 412 Iso Grifos were built 1963–1974.
1967	Lamborghini Miura P400	275 km/h (171 mph)	3,929 cc (239.8 cu in) V12 257 kW (350 PS; 345 hp)	275	Tested by Motor in June 1967. Over 750 units built in 1966–1973 period, which includes P400, P400 S and P400 SV models.
1968	Ferrari 365 GTB/4 Daytona	280 km/h (174 mph)	4,390 cc (268 cu in) V12 262 kW (357 PS; 352 hp)	1,406	Tested by Autocar in 1971.
1969	Lamborghini Miura P400 S	288.6 km/h (179.3 mph)	3,929 cc (239.8 cu in) V12 272 kW (370 PS; 365 hp)	338	Tested by Sport Auto in 1970.
1982	Lamborghini Countach LP500 S	293 km/h (182 mph)	4,754 cc (290.1 cu in) V12 276 kW (375 PS; 370 hp)	321	Tested by Auto, Motor und Sport.
1983	Ruf BTR	305 km/h (190 mph)	3,367 cc (205.5 cu in) turbocharged flat-6 275 kW (374 PS; 369 hp)	about 20–30	Tested by Auto, Motor und Sport, about 20-30 built with Ruf VIN.
1986	Porsche 959	319 km/h (198 mph)	2,849 cc (173.9 cu in) twin-turbocharged flat-6 331 kW (450 PS; 444 hp)	292	Tested by Road & Track in 1987. The 959 Deluxe version attained 317 km/h (197 mph), the Sport version 319 km/h (198 mph). 29 were built in a performance-enhanced 379 kW (508 hp; 515 PS) sports version which reached 339 km/h (211 mph) tested by Auto, Motor und Sport at Nardo in 1988.
1987	Ruf CTR	342 km/h (213 mph)	3,367 cc (205.5 cu in) twin-turbocharged flat-6 345 kW (469 PS; 463 hp)	29	Tested by Auto, Motor und Sport at Nardò Ring in 1988.
1992	McLaren F1	356 km/h (221 mph)	6,064 cc (370.0 cu in) BMW S70/2 60° V12 468 kW (636 PS; 627 hp)	64	Some publications cite the F1's timed top speed as 240.1 mph (386.4 km/h). This speed was achieved by a modified F1 with the rev limiter raised from 7500 rpm to 8300 rpm, not a production car. The F1 in an unmodified state is gear limited at 221 mph (356 km/h).
1993	Dauer 962 Le Mans	404.6 km/h (251.4 mph)	2,994 cc (182.7 cu in) twin-turbocharged flat-6 537 kW (730 PS; 720 hp)	≥10	Independently measured at Ehra-Lessien in November 1998.
2005	Bugatti Veyron EB 16.4	408.47 km/h (253.81 mph)	7,993 cc (487.8 cu in) quad-turbocharged W16 736 kW (1,001 PS; 987 hp)	252	Recorded and verified by German inspection officials on 19 April 2005.
2007	SSC Ultimate Aero TT	412.22 km/h (256.14 mph)	6,345 cc (387.2 cu in) twin-turbocharged V8 882 kW (1,200 PS; 1,183 hp)	24	Inspected and verified by Guinness World Records on 9 October 2007.
2010	Bugatti Veyron 16.4 Super Sport	431.072 km/h (267.856 mph)	7,993 cc (487.8 cu in) quad-turbocharged W16 882 kW (1,200 PS; 1,183 hp)	48	Out of the initial production run of 30 cars, 5 were named the Super Sport World Record Edition, which had the same electronic limiter as the other 25 – but turned off. Pierre-Henri Raphanel drove the unlimited Super Sport World Record Edition to a 431.072 km/h (267.856 mph) two-way average, verified by Guinness World Records. When sold, the electronic limiters were re-activated, limiting them to the same 415 km/h (258 mph) as the entire production run.
2017	Koenigsegg Agera RS	447.19 km/h (277.87 mph)	5,065 cc (309.1 cu in) twin-turbocharged V8 1,000 kW (1,360 PS; 1,341 hp)	25	The base engine is rated at 865 kW (1,176 PS; 1,160 hp), 11 cars were factory specced with the 1 MW (1,360 PS; 1,341 hp) option. Niklas Lilja drove the 1 MW Agera RS to a top speed of 447.19 km/h (277.87 mph), independently verified by Racelogic.
2021	SSC Tuatara	455.3 km/h (282.9 mph)	5,900 cc (360 cu in) twin-turbocharged V8 1,300 kW (1,770 PS; 1,750 hp) when on E85 fuel	100	When on regular fuel, has 1,007 kW (1,369 PS; 1,350 hp). It achieved the top speed on 17 January 2021.

== Difficulties with claims ==
Comparing claimed speeds of the fastest production cars in the world, especially in historical cases, is difficult as there is no standardized method for determining the top speed and no central authority to verify any such claims. Examples of the difficulties faced were highlighted in a two-week long dispute regarding Bugatti's record set in 2010, and Hennessey's 2013 claim that their own top speed run – slower than Bugatti's, lacking the required two-way average, and lacking the minimum 25 car production run – was the real record, due to an issue regarding electronic limiters.

=== Bugatti Veyron limiter removal ===
On 4 July 2010, the Bugatti Veyron Super Sport reached 431.072 km/h (267.856 mph) for a two-way average. Bugatti built 30 identical Super Sports, with 5 of them named World Record Edition. All 30 were equipped with electronic limiters, but the World Record Edition had their limiters turned off for the record attempt. After the record run, all five had their electronic limiters reactivated, so that the entire production run was delivered to customers with a limit of 415 km/h (257.87 mph). Guinness Book of Records, which had listed speeds by British cars with modified rev. limiter as production car records in the 1990s, listed the unlimited 431.072 km/h (267.856 mph) as the production car speed record.

In April 2013, following a press release claiming the record for the Hennessey Venom GT due to the electronic limiter issue, The Sunday Times quoted Guinness' public relations director Jaime Strang as saying: "As the car's speed limiter was deactivated, this modification was against the official guidelines. Consequently, the vehicle's record set at 431.072 km/h (267.856 mph) is no longer valid." Five days later, Guinness World Records officially posted on its website that it: "...would like to confirm that Bugatti's record has not been disqualified; the record category is currently under review." Five days later Bugatti's speed record was confirmed: "Following a thorough review conducted with a number of external experts, Guinness World Records is pleased to announce the confirmation of Bugatti's record of Fastest production car achieved by the Veyron 16.4 Super Sport. The focus of the review was with respect to what may constitute a modification to a car's standard specification. Having evaluated all the necessary information, Guinness World Records is now satisfied that a change to the speed limiter does not alter the fundamental design of the car or its engine."

== Cars excluded from the list ==
Some cars were not considered to be the fastest production vehicles, for various reasons. Here is a list of some well-known cars that have not been able to meet standards needed to be the fastest production car.

Year	Make and model	Top speed	Powertrain	Number of units built	Note(s)
1953	Pegaso Z-102	243.079 km/h (151.042 mph)	2,816 cc (171.8 cu in) V8 186 kW (253 PS; 250 bhp)	84	250 hp supercharged variant. Tested by Belgian Automobile club, at Belgium's Jabbeke highway, but the results are not officially recognized worldwide. Classic Car commented that the Z-102 tested was a proto-type.
1959	Maserati 5000 GT	277.5 km/h (172.4 mph)	4,935 cc (301.2 cu in) V8 254 kW (345 PS; 340 bhp)	2	No accurate measurement and only the first two cars had the 250 kW (340 PS; 340 hp) engine, 22 cars had coachwork by Allemano, 12 by 7 other companies
1959	Maserati 5000 GT	277.5 km/h (172.4 mph)	4,941 cc (301.5 cu in) V8 242 kW (330 PS; 325 bhp)	32	No accurate measurement and only the first two cars had the 250 kW (340 PS; 340 hp) engine, 22 cars had coachwork by Allemano, 12 by 7 other companies
1965	AC Cobra Mk III 427	266 km/h (165 mph)	6,998 cc (427.0 cu in) V8 362 kW (492 PS; 485 hp)	>25	Tested by Car & Driver. Top speed described as observed, not as measured.
1985	Lamborghini Countach 5000QV	298 km/h (185 mph)	5,167 cc (315.3 cu in) V12 335 kW (455 PS; 449 hp)	610	Tested by Auto, Motor und Sport. The car which was tested 305.9 km/h (190.1 mph) by Fast Lane in 1986 and listed in the Guinness Book of World Records 1988 had a factory modified airbox.
1990	Vector W8	389 km/h (242 mph) for prototype	5,973 cc (364.5 cu in) twin-turbocharged V8 466 kW (634 PS; 625 hp)	17 production models	No verified top speed for production model, 350 km/h (218 mph) claimed.
1992	Jaguar XJ220	338.8 km/h (210.5 mph)	3,498 cc (213.5 cu in) twin-turbocharged V6 404 kW (550 PS; 542 hp)	281	Tested by Road & Track. The 349.4 km/h (217.1 mph) Guinness World Records speed was measured by Jaguar one-way without independent control with a car modified for about 50 extra horsepower, the 341.7 km/h (212.3 mph) claims were also factory measured without independent control.
2004	Koenigsegg CCR	387.866 km/h (241.009 mph)	4,700 cc (290 cu in) twin-supercharged V8 601 kW (817 PS; 806 hp)	14	Recorded at the Nardò Ring testing facility on 28 February 2005. Excluded from the list due to being a single directional run.
2014	Hennessey Venom GT	435.31 km/h (270.49 mph)	7,000 cc (430 cu in) twin-turbocharged V8 928 kW (1,261 PS; 1,244 bhp)	13	Single direction top speed test run in 2014 and no Hennessey VIN.
2019	Bugatti Chiron Super Sport 300+	490.484 km/h (304.773 mph)	7,993 cc (487.8 cu in) quad-turbocharged W16 1,177 kW (1,600 PS; 1,578 hp)	100-110 (Note: 30 Super Sport 300+ in black-with-orange-stripes livery and about 70-80 mechanically identical ‘standard’ Super Sport)	On 2 August 2019, Andy Wallace achieved a maximum of 490.484 km/h (304.773 mph) in a pre-production prototype at Ehra-Lessien, which was verified by TÜV. The production version has the same bodywork, engine and gearbox but no roll cage, different seats, ride height and an electronically limited top speed of 440 km/h (273.4 mph). Excluded from the list because it was a unidirectional top speed run.
2026	Yangwang U9 Xtreme	503.17 km/h (312.66 mph)	Four TZ240XYA electric motors 2,220 kW (3,018 PS; 2,977 hp)	30	A prototype achieved a 496.22 km/h (308.34 mph) top speed on 20 September 2025. New world speed record set in Abu Dhabi on November 1, 2026. Both runs were unidirectional and thus do not qualify for an appearance in the main list.

== See also ==
- History of the automobile
- List of land speed records
- List of fastest production cars by acceleration
- List of production cars by power output
