= Mercedes Simplex =

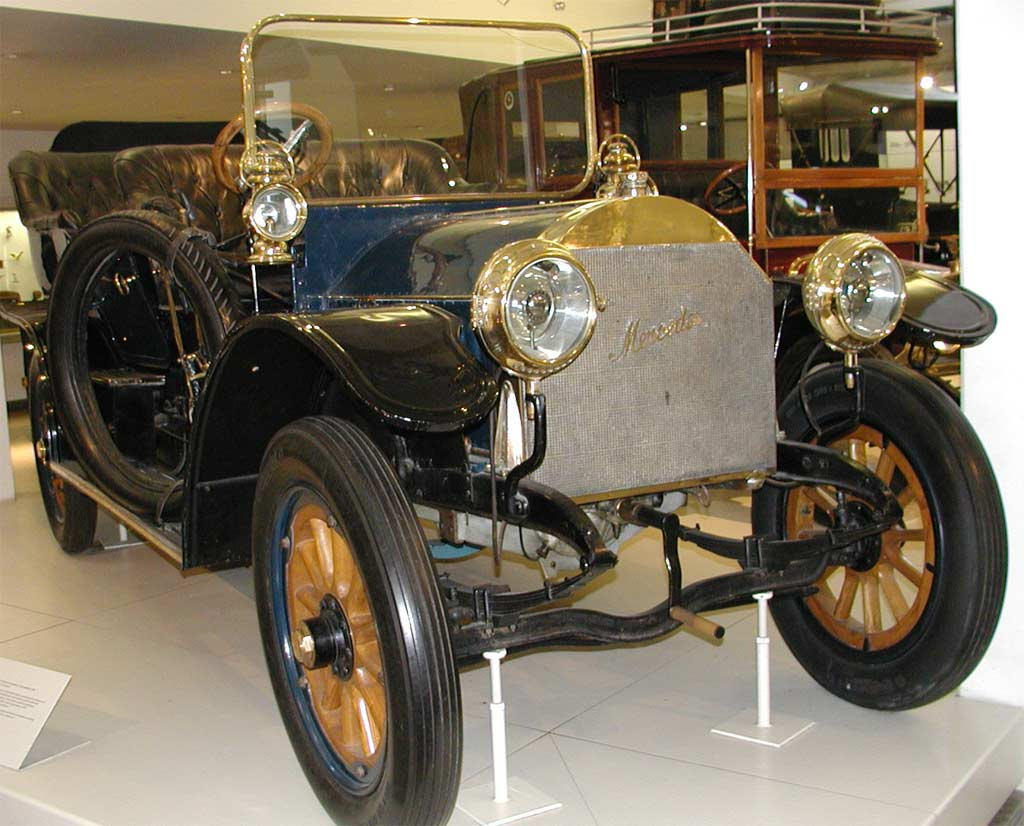

Overview
- Manufacturer: Daimler Motoren Gesellschaft
- Production: 1902–1909

Body and chassis
- Class: Sportwagen; Oberklasse

Powertrain
- Engine: 5315 cc/9236 cc (1902 to 1909) in-line 4; 41.7 hp at 1050 rpm (1902)
- Transmission: 4-forward/1-reverse

Dimensions
- Wheelbase: 3,540 mm (139 in)
- Curb weight: 1250/1400 kg (1902–1909)

Chronology
- Predecessor: Mercedes 35hp

The Mercedes Simplex was an automobile produced from 1902 to 1909 by the Daimler Motoren Gesellschaft (DMG, Daimler Motor Society, a predecessor of Daimler-Benz and Daimler-Chrysler). It continued the use of the Mercedes name as the brand of DMG, rather than Daimler.

The Mercedes Simplex was designed by Wilhelm Maybach in Stuttgart, Germany. It featured powerful engines whose power ranged from 40 to 60 hp. Its large and wide body had a low center of gravity. A highlight of the Simplex family was the model 60 hp. With this car Mercedes laid the foundation of a new car segment, the super-luxury class with an imposing touring Saloon body, it was unlike anything else at the time and quickly established itself well with royalty and aristocrats. Its immense size and luxuries were to set the milestones for the development of this segment, which was continued on by numerous models over the next 70 odd years, including the 630, 770 "Großer Mercedes", 300 "Adenauer" and terminating in 1981 with the demise of the 600 "Großer Mercedes". All these models occupied the absolute top segment in the automotive world, along with brands such as Rolls-Royce, Bentley, Cadillac and other demised luxury car manufacturers.

== The name ==
Official logo in the unit's radiator

The car's predecessor, the Mercedes 35hp of 1901, had broken with the previous primitive automotive standards. Now, DMG and Maybach intended to improve this further by providing "comfort by means of simplicity", hence the name Simplex. A complementary explanation for the name is that, by the standards of 1901, the car was very simple to operate.

== History ==
=== DMG, Maybach and Jellinek ===
The creation of the previous model, the Mercedes 35hp, predecessor of the Simplex, was due to DMG's industrial might, the know-how of its industrial designer Wilhelm Maybach and Emil Jellinek's enthusiasm for motorsport. Jellinek was DMG's foreign agent based on the French Riviera where he was the Austro-Hungarian consul. That car had resulted in the company's early success.

In 1902, Maybach decided to incorporate a series of modifications to the Simplex, anticipating a large number of sales. To suit their basically high society clients, the new Mercedes would be shown publicly "while driving through the most traditional avenues in town or to picnic in a park". Meeting Maybach personally at Berlin's automobile exhibition of 1903 Kaiser Wilhelm II of Germany expressed his admiration for the car. Congratulating him for all the achievements at the races, he contrasted these with car's name, commenting: "A truly beautiful engine you have here! But it's not as simple as that, you know."

=== Mercedes Simplex as a racecar (1902) ===
When Jellinek received his first Simplex on 1 March 1902 at Nice, he rushed to incorporate it into his Mercedes race team, competing in the Nice-La Turbie hillclimbing race. He defeated all his opponents again and set new records.

On 7 April 1902, during Nice week, Albert Lemaître finished second in the Nice – La Turbie mountain race driving a Mercedes Simplex. He was competing in the category for racing cars weighing more than 1000 kg.

Also in 1902, in the United States, a Mercedes Simplex won the 5-mile track race at Grosse Pointe, Detroit.

In this 1902 campaign, the third step involved William K. Vanderbilt Jr, a US multimillionaire and race car enthusiast who created in 1904 the American Vanderbilt Cup. He had already set several records with the previous Mercedes, in some of the most popular races around the turn of the century, usually long distance ones.

Now, with the Mercedes Simplex, Vanderbilt took part in the 600-mile race to Paris. Later, he broke all records in the Ablis to Chartres race with flying start, with a top-speed of 111.8 km/h. One of his Simplex units is the oldest surviving Mercedes car.

=== 1902–1909: Remarkable races ===
Date	Event	Circuit	Driver	Country	Result	Car
August 31, 1902	Frankfurt Circuit Race	Oberforsthaus	Wilhelm Werner	Germany	1st	Mercedes Simplex 40 hp
April 1, 1903	Nice-La Turbie		Otto Hieronimus (Mercedes team)	Germany	1st	Mercedes Simplex
April 1, 1903	Nice-La Turbie		Wilhelm Werner (Mercedes team)	Germany	2nd	Mercedes Simplex
April 1, 1903	Nice-La Turbie		Count Zborowski	Poland	Crashed	Mercedes Simplex
April 7, 1903	Mile Race of Nice	Promenade des Anglais	Hermann Braun	Germany	1st	Mercedes Simplex
May 25, 1904	May Ostend (Belgium)	land speed	Pierre de Caters	Belgium	97.25 mph (World record)	Mercedes Simplex 90 hp
June 19, 1904	Frankfurt Circuit Race	Oberforsthaus	Willy Pöge	Germany	1st	Mercedes Simplex 60 hp

== Simplex models ==
In 1903, Maybach designed a second version of the Mercedes Simplex, of 60 hp.

Simplex model	Starting	Ending
40 hp, 26/45 hp	1902	1910
28 hp, 21/35 hp	1902	1909
20 hp	1902	1903
18/22 hp	1903	1904
60 hp, 36/65 hp	1903	1909
18/28 hp	1904	1906

== Dimensions ==
Mercedes Simplex' framework was long, wide and with a low center of gravity, giving an improved stability at high speeds. The wheelbase was extended to 2.45 meters (8'1").

Its carefully designed frame was made of pressed steel. The engine was welded onto it directly, keeping it at a low height.

Other general modifications reduced the overall Simplex weight to 942 kg, assuring better results in racing.

== Axles ==
The original 1902 wheels were wooden, with 12 non-removable spokes and pneumatic tires. Later, in 1905, the Mercedes Simplex pioneered cast-steel wheels.

The front and rear axles were modernized progressively, becoming equal in diameter around 1909:

- 1902: 910x90-1020x120. Rear 10% bigger.
- 1909: 915x105-935x135. Roughly equalized.

Attached to these were the two powerful brake systems, one hand-operated and the other by foot:

- the main hand brake acted on the rear wheels, with drum brakes
- the secondary foot brake acted on the chain drive's intermediate driveshaft

Both systems were water-cooled by a sprinkling system over 'hot zones' when braking.

Both axles were rigid, featuring semi-elliptic springs. The steering-axles were located at the extremes, decreasing the transmission of road shocks to the driver's hands.

== Drive system ==
The Mercedes Simplex' engine was mounted over the front axle. The engine's power was taken from a sprocket flywheel, 60 cm in diameter, transmitting it to the rear drive by a long roller chain.

The 'gate gear' manual gearbox featured four speeds and reverse, controlling a coil spring clutch acting on the flywheel system. A lever produced both declutching and deceleration together.

== Engine ==
The engine produced 44 hp at 1300 rpm.

Its four cylinders featured:

- water cooling
- lubrication by driver-controlled pressure
- 120 mm bore and 150 mm stroke
- valves mechanically timed by enclosed camshaft mechanically
- engine displacement of 6786 cc

It used magneto electric-spark ignition system, with single 'spray-nozzle' carburetor, for all cylinders; featuring a new atomization system, improved by preheating.

The engine was started up by a hand crank and helped by the use of a decompressor.

Maybach's tubular honeycomb radiator featured a rectangular grille of 8,070 square shaped pipes of 6x6 mm, with improved airflow.

Originally, when launched in 1902, the Mercedes Simplex radiators did not have a fan. A set of vanes mounted on the flywheel increased the air-flow throughout the engine/radiator compartment. Its total water capacity, 7 litres, was smaller than the previous Mercedes model by 2 litres.

The engine compartment was covered by metal sheets. Its chassis base was also covered, something imitated by many other car models later.

== Surviving cars ==
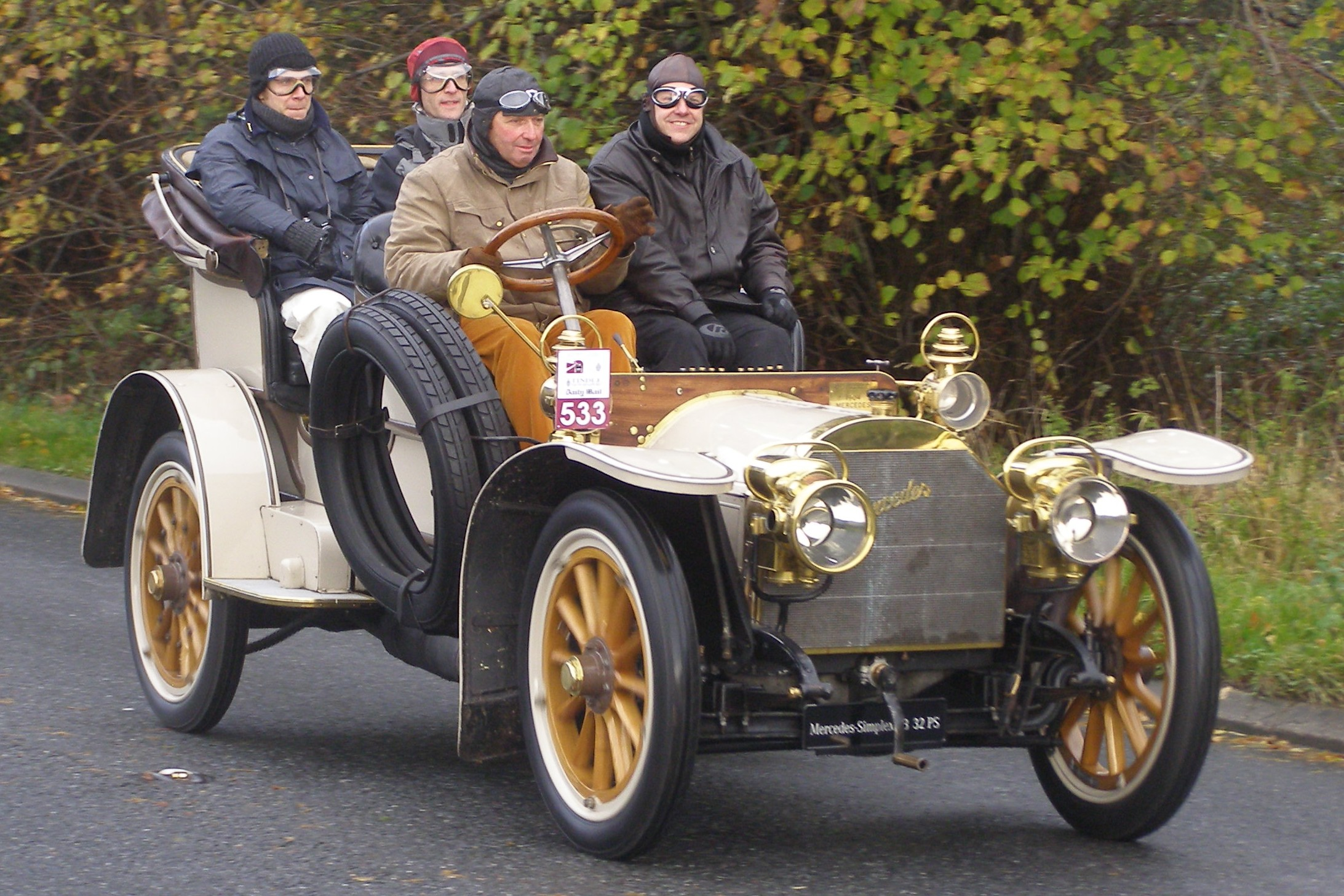
A 1904 Simplex during the 2008 London to Brighton Veteran Car Run

- Between November 2005 and March 2006, the Mercedes-Benz Museum, built over the original site of DMG Stuttgart-Untertürkheim factory of 100 years ago, exhibited 13 original Mercedes Simplex units. The oldest one was the vehicle owned by Vanderbilt. There was also, an Argentine unit preserving its specifically enlarged wheels to drive over the muddy Pampas roads. All 13 cars were functional, taking part in several annual nostalgic competitions such as the London to Brighton Veteran Car Run and Gordon Bennett Revival.

== See also ==
- Daimler Motoren Gesellschaft
- Mercedes 35hp
- Wilhelm Maybach
- Mercedes (car)
- Mercedes-Benz
- Timeline of most powerful production cars
