= Czinger 21C =

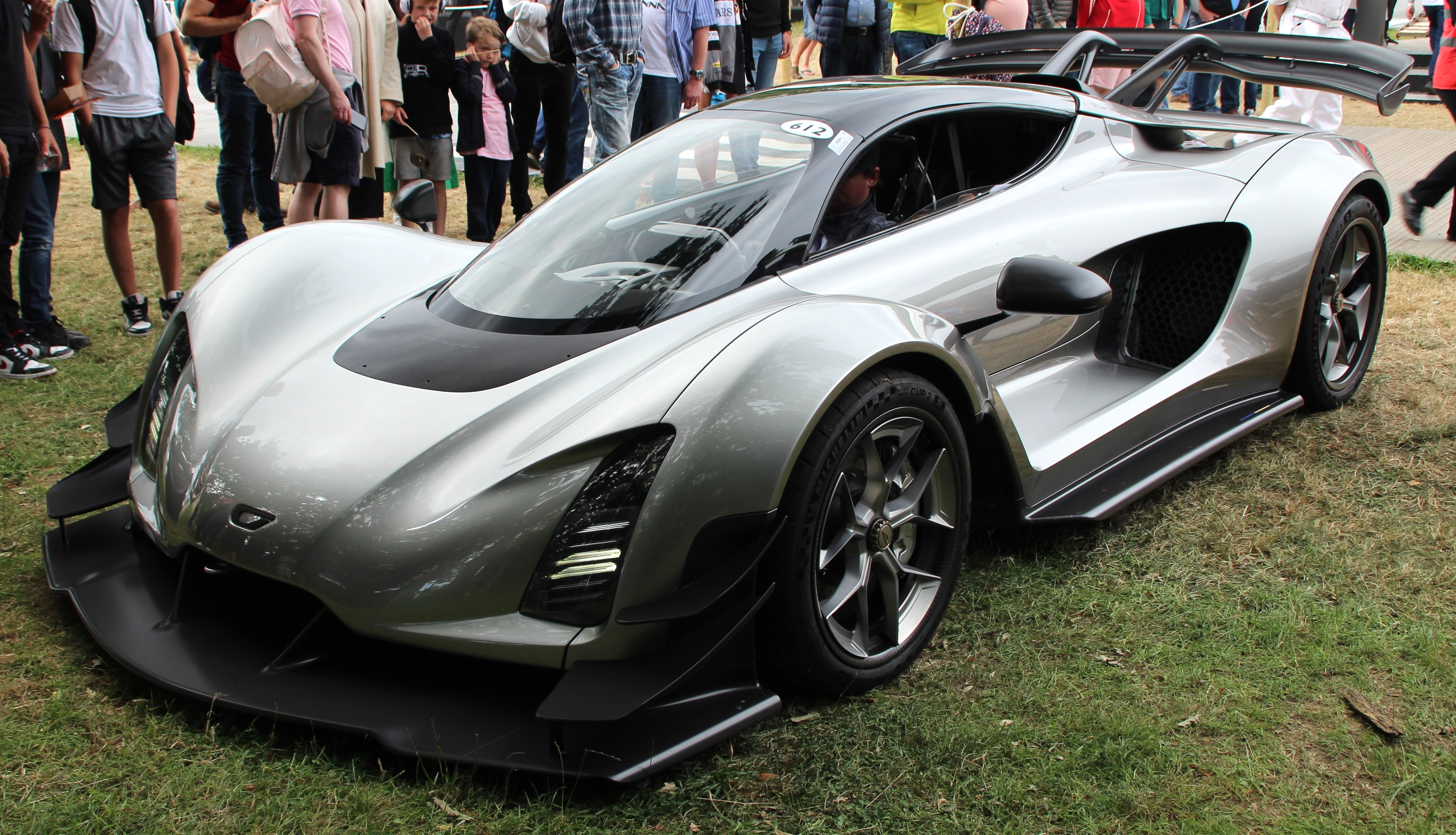

Overview
- Manufacturer: Czinger Vehicles
- Production: 2021–present
- Designer: David O’Connell; Kevin Czinger; Lukas Czinger

Body and chassis
- Class: Sports car (S)
- Body style: 2-door coupé

Powertrain
- Engine: 2.88 L (176 cu in) DOHC Twin turbo V8
- Electric motor: 3x Electric Motors (1x Advanced axial flux Motor Generator Unit (MGU) + 2x high output electric motors with torque-vectoring function for efficient wheel control)
- Power output: 950 hp (708 kW; 963 PS); 550 lb⋅ft (746 N⋅m; 76 kg⋅m) of torque 1,250 hp (932 kW; 1,267 PS) at 11,500 rpm (combined); 1,350 hp (1,007 kW; 1,369 PS) at 11,500 rpm (21C Blackbird)
- Transmission: 7-speed Xtrac sequential transaxle with hydraulic actuated multi-plate clutch
- Hybrid drivetrain: Combination Parallel hybrid and Through the Road (TTR) hybrid
- Battery: 2 kWh lithium titanate battery

Dimensions
- Width: 2,050 mm (80.7 in)
- Curb weight: 1,250 kg (2,760 lb)

Chronology
- Predecessor: Divergent Blade

The Czinger 21C is a hybrid sports car developed using 3D printing by the American car manufacturer Czinger Vehicles. Manufacturing began in 2021, with a planned production run of 80 units and deliveries starting Q4 2023, most expected to be delivered in 2024 according to founder Kevin Czinger.

== Presentation ==
Designed, developed and built in Los Angeles, California, the Czinger 21C was the first product of Czinger Vehicles, named after its founders Kevin and Lukas Czinger. The car was to be presented at the Geneva Motor Show in March 2020, but the show was canceled due to the COVID-19 pandemic. It was instead presented on March 11, 2020, in London during a special event.

Czinger Vehicles will produce only 80 units in two configurations: a road variant and a track variant called "Lightweight Track".

== Technical characteristics ==
The 21C has a driver's seat in the central position and an in-line, tandem passenger seat behind that of the driver, minimizing the width of the cockpit.

The brake caliper and upright components are combined into a single unit called the BrakeNode.

== Powertrain ==
The 21C has a hybrid gasoline engine consisting of a bespoke Flat-plane crank twin-turbo V8 of 2.88 liters (176 cu in) capacity, has a bore x stroke of 84 mm × 65 mm (3.31 in × 2.56 in) in the rear central position associated with two electric motors located on the front and powered by a lithium-titanate battery. The combination provides 1,250 horsepower (932 kW; 1,267 PS) at 10,500 rpm transmitted to the rear wheels via a seven-speed sequential transaxle with hydraulic actuated multi-plate clutch. An exclusive version limited to 4 examples called the 21C Blackbird increases the power output to 1,350 horsepower (1,010 kW; 1,370 PS) by tuning the engine for 101 octane fuel.

== Lap records ==
Year	Venue/Event	Driver	Time
2021	Laguna Seca	Joel Miller	1:25.44
2024	Laguna Seca	Joel Miller	1:24.75
2024	Goodwood Festival of Speed	Chris Ward	48.82
2024	Circuit of the Americas	Chris Ward	2:10.70
2025	Laguna Seca	Joel Miller	1:22.30

The 21C has set a number of production car lap records. In August 2021 Joel Miller set a time of 1:25.44 minutes around Laguna Seca using road legal Michelin Pilot Sport Cup2R tires and a high downforce track version of the car. This record was reclaimed in August 2024 once again by Joel Miller, setting a time of 1:24.75 minutes. The 21C also set records in 2024 at the Goodwood Festival of Speed Hillclimb and the Circuit of the Americas, with times of 48.82 seconds from Chris Ward, and 2:10.70 minutes respectively. On December 15, 2025, the 21C set a new track record for a production car at Laguna Seca, with a lap time of 1:22.30.

== Gallery ==
Czinger 21C rear

Czinger 21C V Max

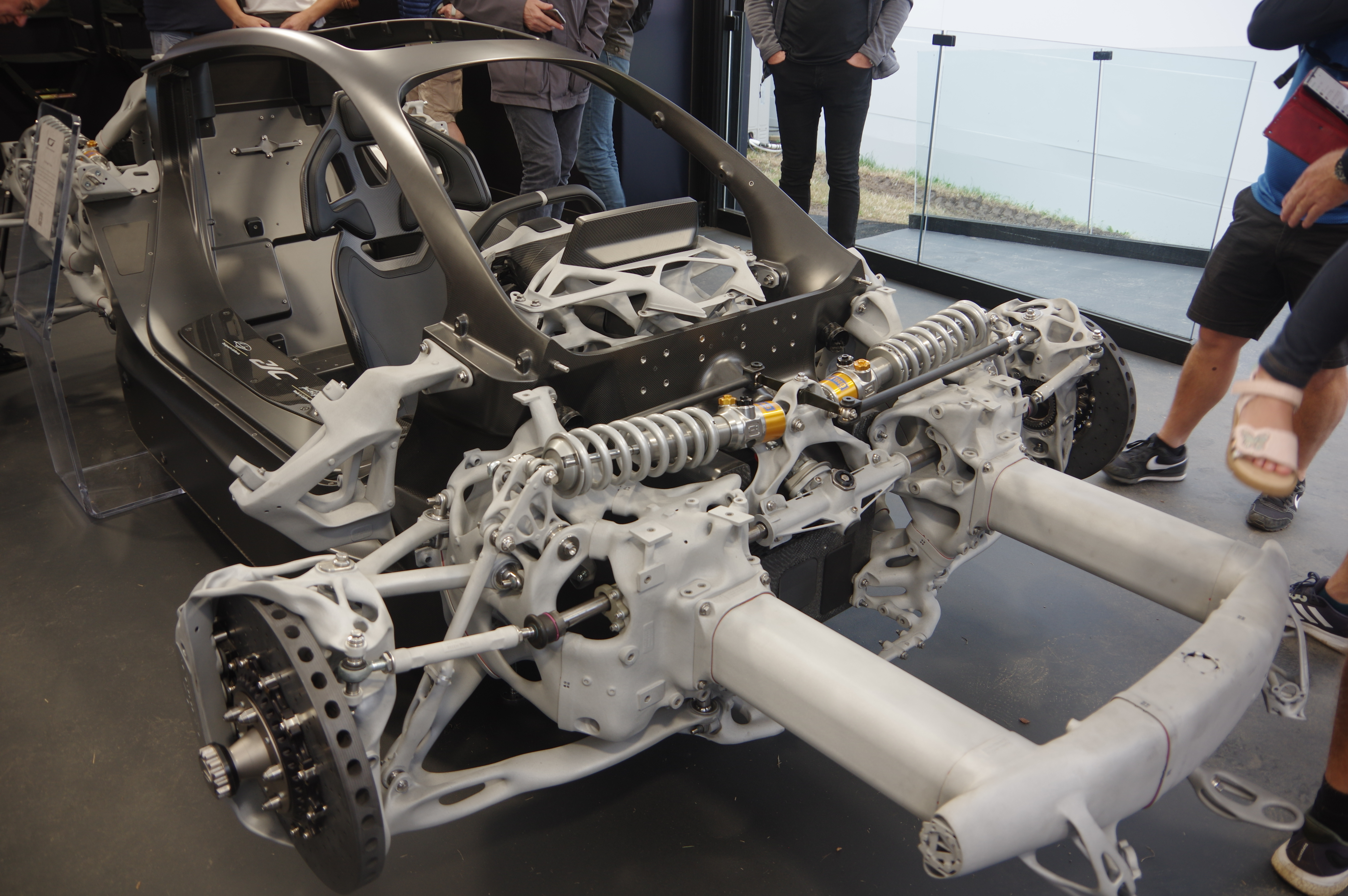
Czinger 21C chassis

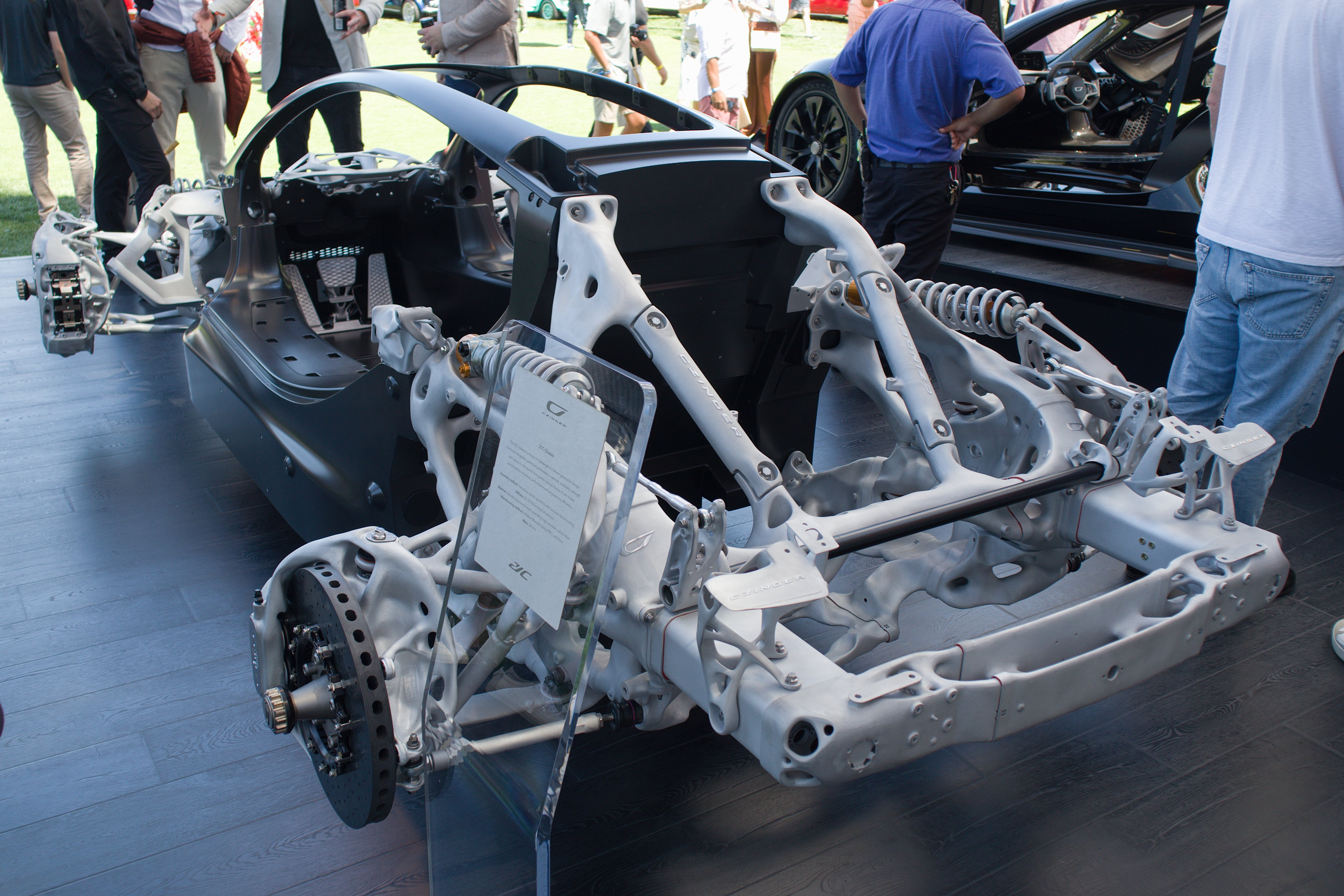
Czinger 21C chassis (rear)

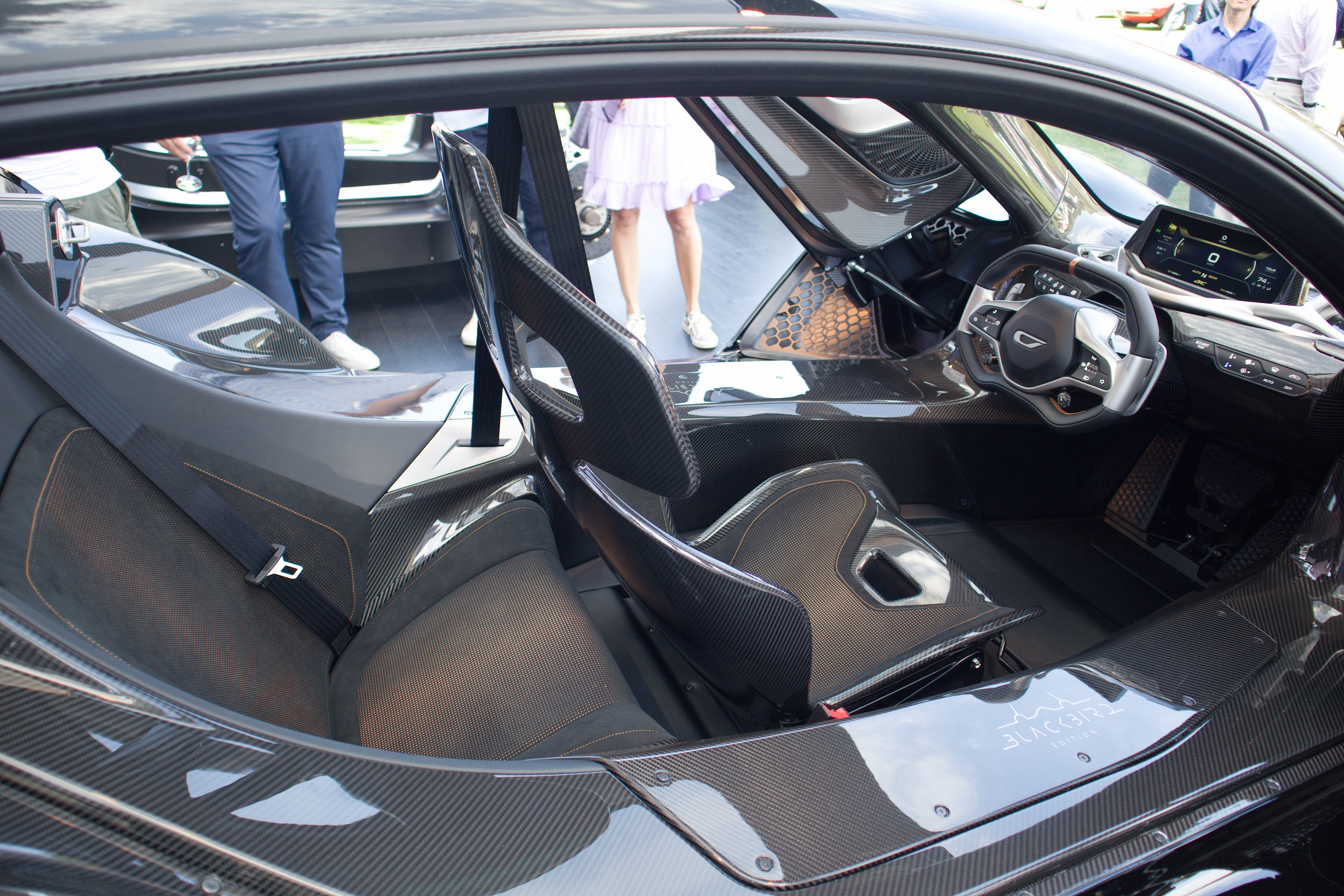
Czinger 21C Blackbird interior

== See also ==
- List of production cars by power output
