= Axial flux motor =

Type of electric motor construction

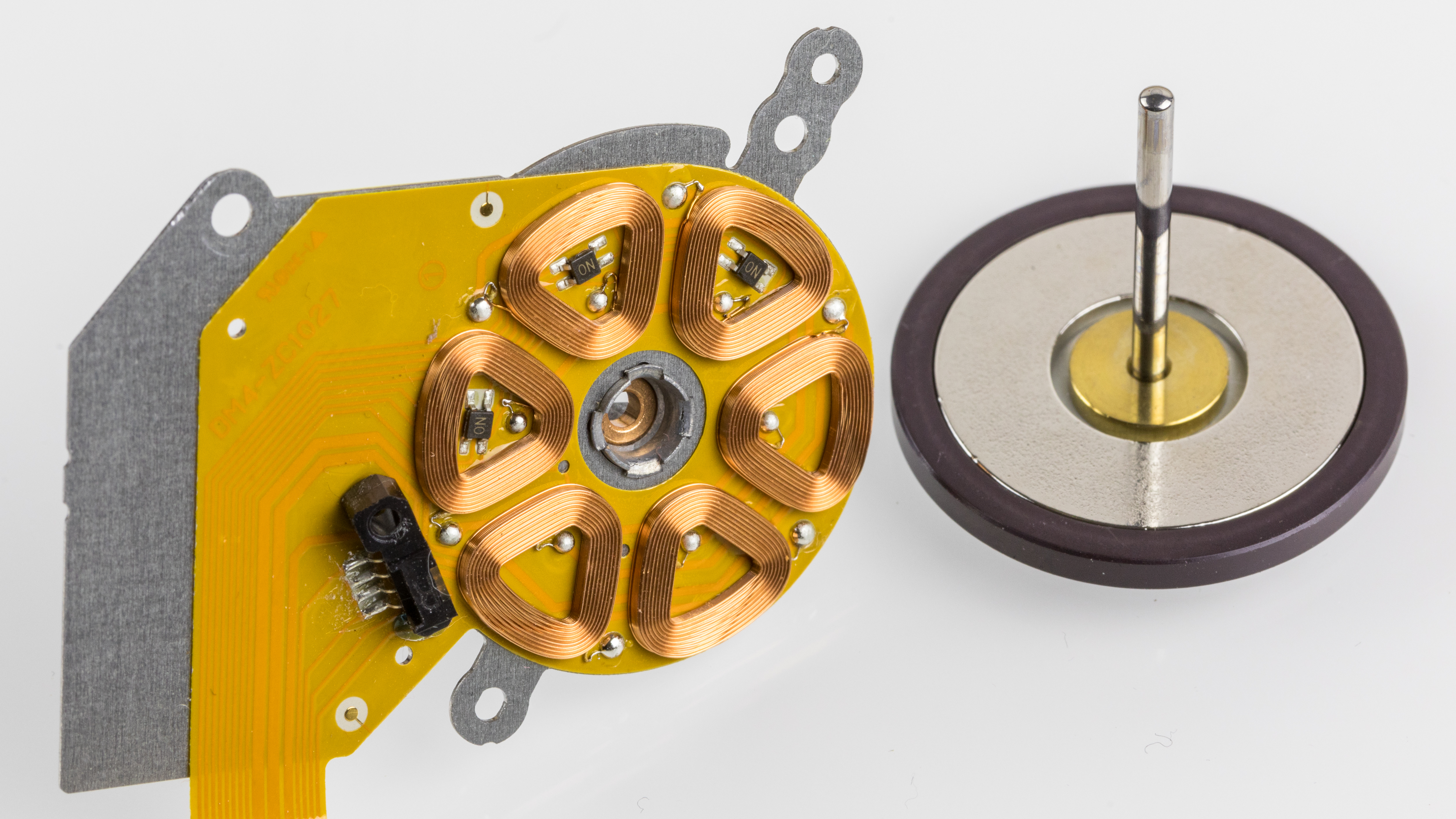
A miniature DC brushless axial motor used in a Digital Data Storage drive, showing the integration with PCB construction techniques. The rotor shown to the right is magnetized axially with alternating polarity.

An axial flux motor (axial gap motor, or pancake motor) is a geometry of electric motor construction where the gap between the rotor and stator, and therefore the direction of magnetic flux between the two, is aligned parallel with the axis of rotation, rather than radially as with the concentric cylindrical geometry of the more common radial flux motor. With axial flux geometry torque increases with the cube of the rotor diameter, whereas in a radial flux the increase is only quadratic. Axial flux motors have a larger magnetic surface and overall surface area (for cooling) than radial flux motors for a given volume.

== Characteristics ==
=== Advantages ===
- A motor can be built upon any flat structure, such as a PCB, by adding coils and a bearing.
- The coil winding process and the process of joining the coil and core may be simpler.
- Since the coils are flat, rectangular copper strips can more easily be used, simplifying high-current windings.
- It is often possible to make the rotor significantly lighter.
- Potentially shorter magnetic path length.
- Most structural components are flat and can be produced without specialised casting or tooling.
- Since the magnetic path through the windings is straight, grain-oriented electrical steel can be easily used, offering higher permeability and lower core losses.

=== Disadvantages ===
- The rotor is typically much wider, causing increased rotational inertia, and the higher centrifugal forces can reduce the maximum rotational speed.
- Uneven flux distribution due to wedge-shaped segments.
- The segments narrow towards the centre, leaving less room to arrange windings and connections.

== Design ==
AFMs can use single or dual rotors or single or dual stators. The dual stator/single rotor design is more common in high power applications, although it requires a yoke (housing) with accompanying iron losses. Single stator/dual rotor designs can dispense with the yoke, saving its weight and increasing efficiency. In the latter, the rotors and their iron plates that close the flux move in the same direction/speed as the magnetic field.

In one example, grain-oriented (30Q120) steel was used to make the stator tooth for an induction motor. It used 18 teeth between the two rotors. Each stator tooth was wound with coils connected in series, 6 for each phase. The magnetic potential adds the air gap magnetic potential, stator tooth magnetic potential and rotor yoke and tooth magnetic potential.

Some AFMs can be easily stacked to provide higher power output in modular fashion. YASA's 37 kg stackable 750R motor delivers 800Nm and >5kW/kg with an axial length of 98 mm (3.9 in).

== Uses ==
Although this geometry has been used since the first electromagnetic motors were developed, its usage was rare until the widespread availability of strong permanent magnets and the development of brushless DC motors, which could better exploit this geometry's advantages.

Axial geometry can be applied to almost any operating principle (e.g. brushed DC, induction, stepper, reluctance) that can be used in a radial motor. Even within the same electrical operating principle, different application and design considerations can make one geometry more suitable than the other. Axial geometries allow some magnetic topologies that would not be practical in a radial geometry. Axial motors are typically shorter and wider than an equivalent radial motor.

Axial motors have been commonly used for low-power applications, especially in tightly integrated electronics since the motor can be built directly upon a printed circuit board (PCB), and can use PCB traces as the stator windings. High-power, brushless axial motors are more recent, but are beginning to see usage in some electric vehicles. One of the longest produced axial motors is the brushed DC Lynch motor, where the rotor is almost entirely composed of flat copper strips with small iron cores inserted, allowing power-dense operation.

=== Automotive ===
Mercedes-Benz subsidiary YASA (Yokeless and Segmented Armature) makes AFMs that have powered various concept (Jaguar C-X75), prototype, and racing vehicles. It was also used in the Koenigsegg Regera, the Ferrari SF90 Stradale and 296GTB, Lamborghini Revuelto, McLaren Artura and the Lola-Drayson. The company is investigating the potential for placing motors inside wheels, given that AFM's low mass does not excessively increase a vehicle's unsprung mass.

In July 2025, YASA announced a prototype 550 kW (738 hp) 13.1 kg (29 lb) motor, equating to power density of 42 kW/kg, which the company claimed to be the highest ever achieved. By contrast, the state of the art EV motor from Lucid Motors offers a 500 kW, 31.4-kg motor, or 16 kW/kg.

BMW Vision Neue Klasse prototypes were already seen with wheel hub motors without brake calipers, but the Munich-based startup DeepDrive works on dual-rotor radial flux motors.

In June 2026, Mercedes-Benz started large-scale production of AFMs in their Berlin-Marienfelde factory. The first application of these motors will be in the High Performance Mercedes‑AMG GT 4-Touring Coupe.

=== Aviation ===
The Rolls-Royce ACCEL, holder of the current world speed record for an electric aircraft, uses three axial flux motors.

YASA makes AFMs for the 3-motor Rolls Royce Spirit of Innovation. Their target is aircraft motors that deliver 50 kW/kg, to allow for the substantial weight reductions needed to enable electric-powered flight.

In 2025, Flying Whales announced that Evolito would supply axial flux motors for the aircraft.

=== General purpose ===
Emrax makes a line of axial flux motors: the Emrax 228 (power density 4.58 kw/kg), Emrax 268 (5.02 kw/kg), and Emrax 348 (4.87 kw/kg).

Conifer plans to offer iron-based 1 to 25-hp (0.75-18.65-kW) units for applications such as HVAC fans and pumps, tools and equipment, and in-wheel motors for small electric vehicles such as scooters, ATVs, and urban delivery vehicles.
