= Ferrari 296 =

V6 sports car designed by Ferrari

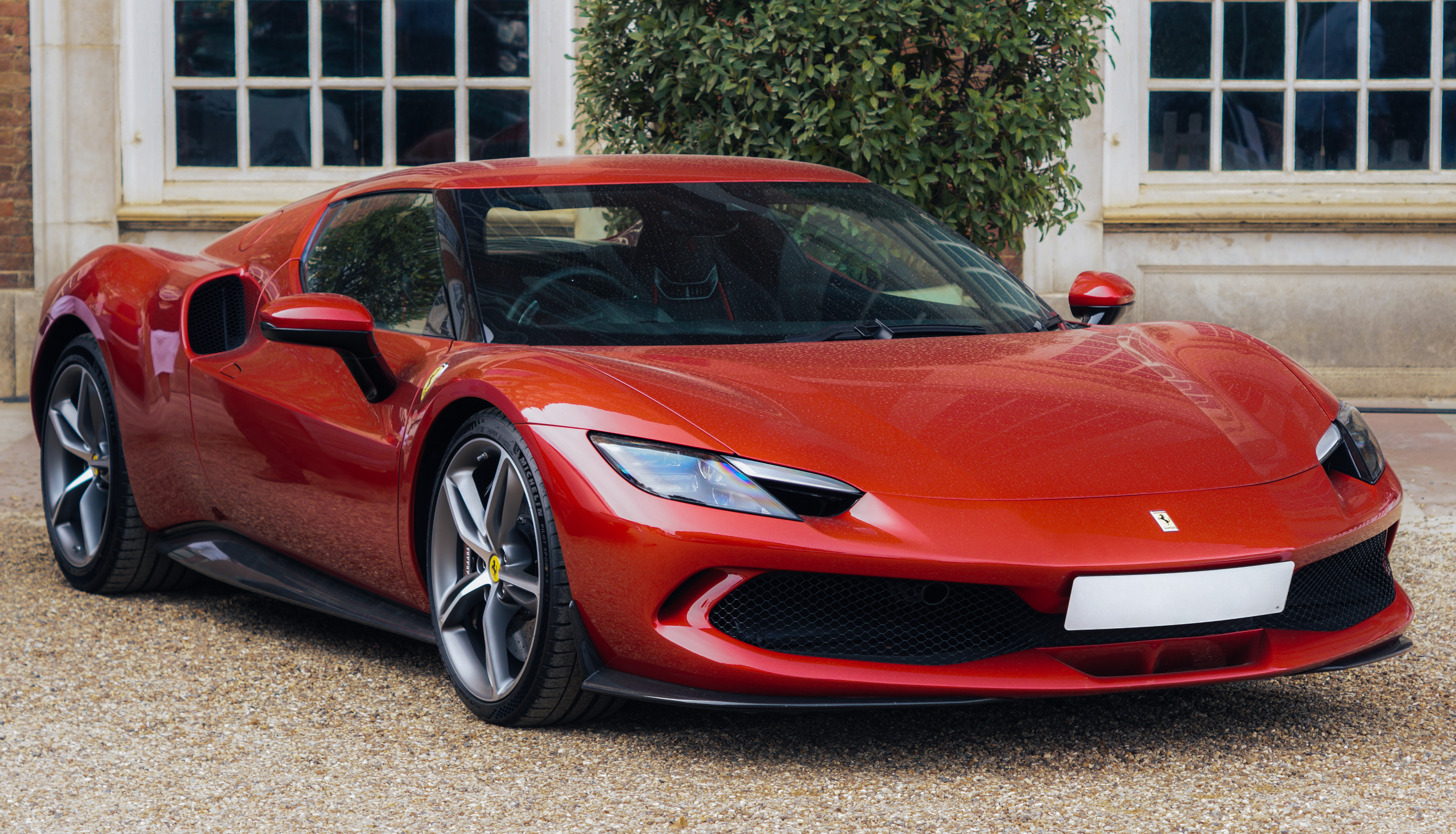
- Ferrari 296 GTB

Overview
- Manufacturer: Ferrari
- Production: Coupe: 2022–2025; Spider: 2023–2026
- Assembly: Italy: Maranello
- Designer: Ferrari Styling Centre under the direction of Flavio Manzoni

Body and chassis
- Class: Sports car (S)
- Body style: 2-door berlinetta (GTB); 2-door retractable hard-top convertible (GTS)
- Layout: Longitudinal rear mid-engine, rear-wheel-drive
- Related: Ferrari SF90 Stradale

Powertrain
- Engine: 2,992 cc (3.0 L; 182.6 cu in) F163 BC 120° twin-turbo V6
- Electric motor: YASA MGU-K dual-rotor single-stator axial flux motor
- Power output: Engine: 663 PS (488 kW; 654 hp); Electric motors: 167 PS (123 kW; 165 hp); Combined: 830 PS (610 kW; 819 hp)
- Transmission: 8-speed Magna 8DCL900 dual-clutch
- Hybrid drivetrain: PHEV
- Battery: 7.45 kWh (26.8 MJ) lithium-ion

Dimensions
- Wheelbase: 2,600 mm (102.4 in)
- Length: 4,565 mm (179.7 in)
- Width: 1,958 mm (77.1 in)
- Height: 1,187 mm (46.7 in)
- Kerb weight: 1,470–1,540 kg (3,241–3,395 lb)

Chronology
- Predecessor: Ferrari F8

The Ferrari 296 (Type F171) is a sports car built since 2022 by the Italian company Ferrari. The 296 is a two-seater, offered as a GTB coupe and a GTS folding hard-top convertible. It is a plug-in hybrid with a rear mid-engine, rear-wheel-drive layout and its powertrain combines a twin-turbocharged 120-degree bank angle V6, with an electric motor fitted in between engine and gearbox. The 296 can be driven in electric-only mode for short distances, to comply with use in urban zero-emission zones.

Unveiled on 24 June 2021, the 296 is Ferrari's first stock model with 6-cylinders other than the Dino 206 GT, 246 GT and 246 GTS cars produced by Ferrari but sold under the Dino marque. Its power pack puts out a combined 830 PS (610 kW; 819 hp), giving the 296 a power-to-weight ratio of 560 hp/ton.

== History ==
The 296 GTB was presented as the first "real Ferrari with just six cylinders on it" on 24 June 2021. Previously, such models were both designed and built by Ferrari, but marketed as a new, entry-level Dino brand, below Ferrari's exclusively V12-model policy, until 1974. The new car went on sale in 2022. The 296 in the model name reprises the original Dino's naming scheme, indicating the engine's displacement and the number of cylinders. GTB stands for Gran Turismo Berlinetta.

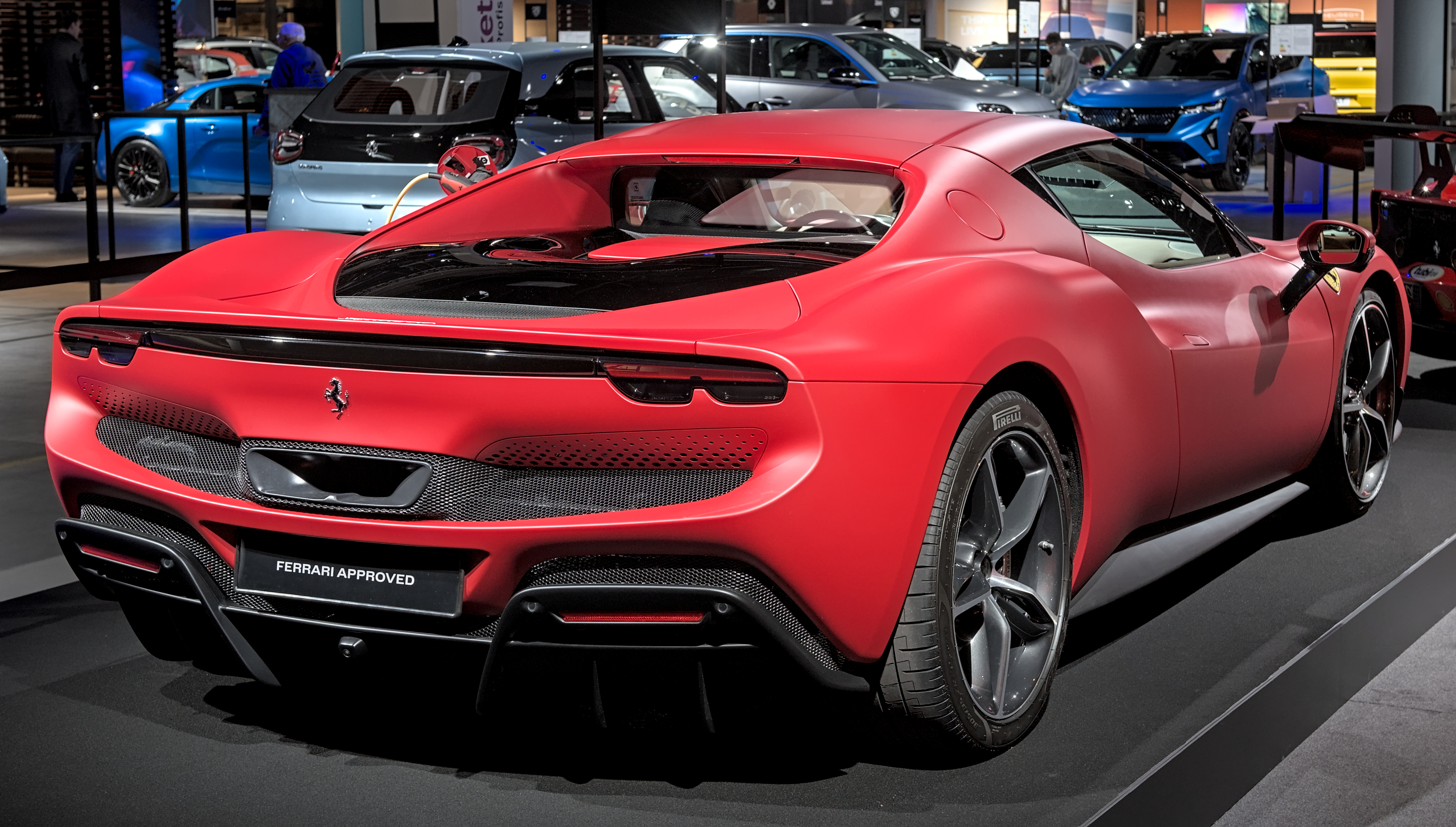
Rear view

== Engine ==
The 296 GTB is powered by the F163 BC – a 2,992 cc (3.0 L) twin-turbo 120° V6 engine – with a maximum output of 488 kW (654 hp; 663 PS) at 8,000 RPM, in combination with a 123 kW (165 hp; 167 PS) and 315 Nm (232 lb-ft) of torque electric motor. The system output is given as 830 PS (819 hp; 610 kW) and has a combined torque of 740 Nm (546 lb-ft) at 6,250 RPM. A high-voltage accumulator positioned under the floor with an energy capacity of 7.45 kWh (26.8 MJ) enables an electrical range of 25 km (16 mi). The sports car accelerates to 100 km/h (62 mph) in 2.9 seconds, and the top speed is specified as over 330 km/h (205 mph).

== Variants ==
=== Assetto Fiorano ===
The Assetto Fiorano is the track-oriented kit for the 296 GTB, featuring an upgraded suspension, carbon-fibre bodywork, and a polycarbonate rear window screen.

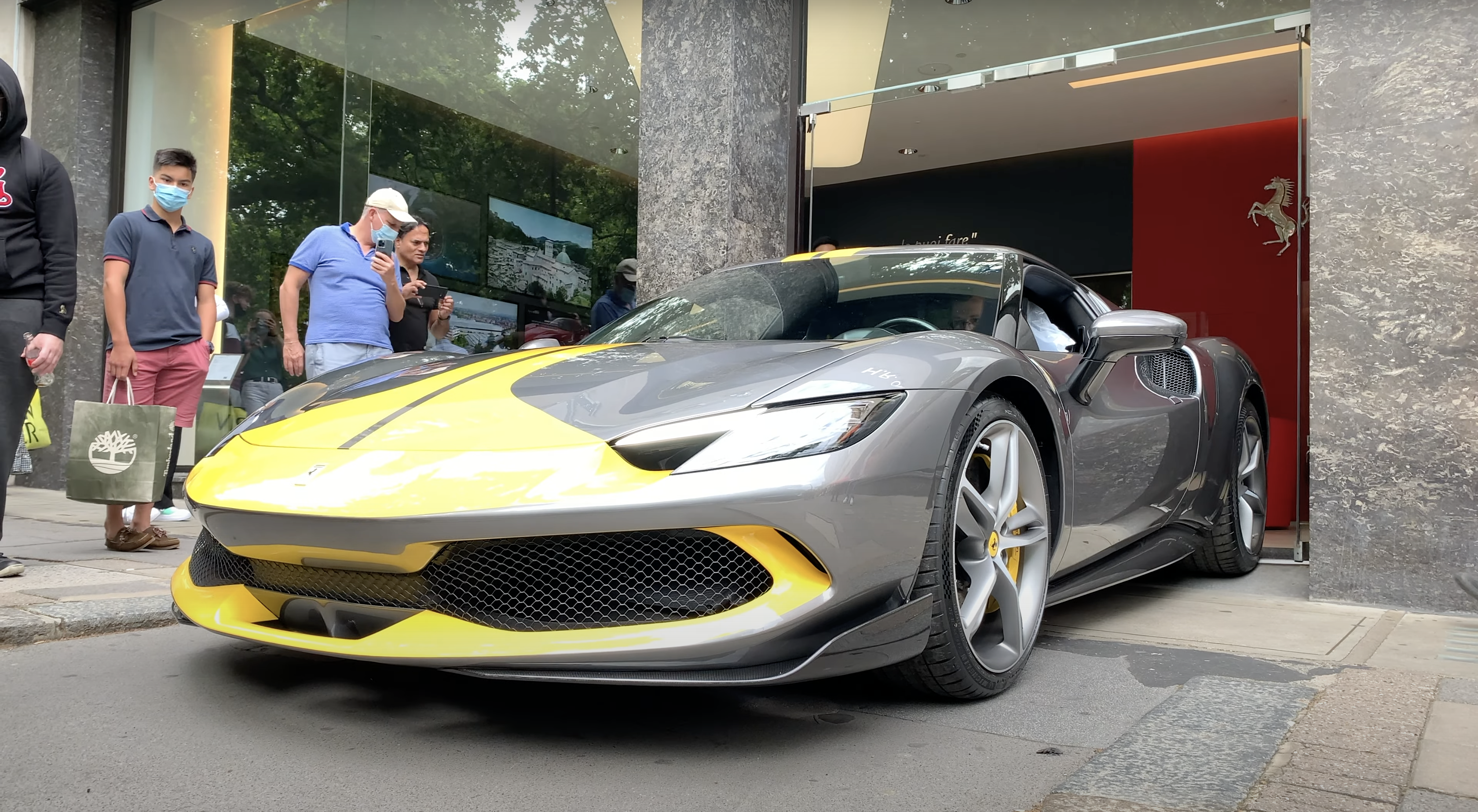

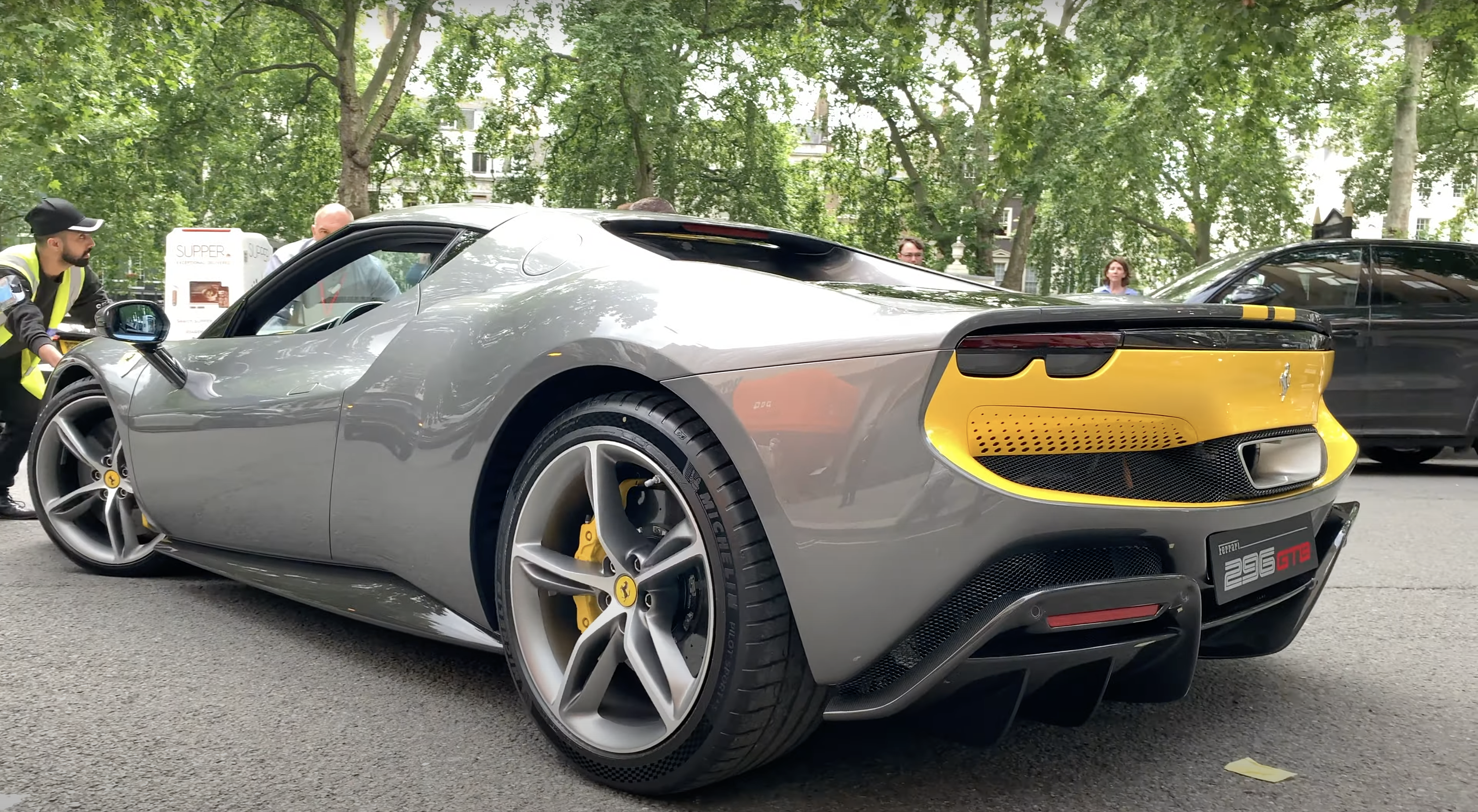

=== GTS ===
The 296 GTS is an open-top variant of the 296 GTB with a folding hardtop. The top takes 14 seconds for operation and can be operated with speeds up to 45 km/h (28 mph). The GTS weighs 70 kg (154 lb) more than the GTB due to chassis reinforcing components but maintains equal performance.

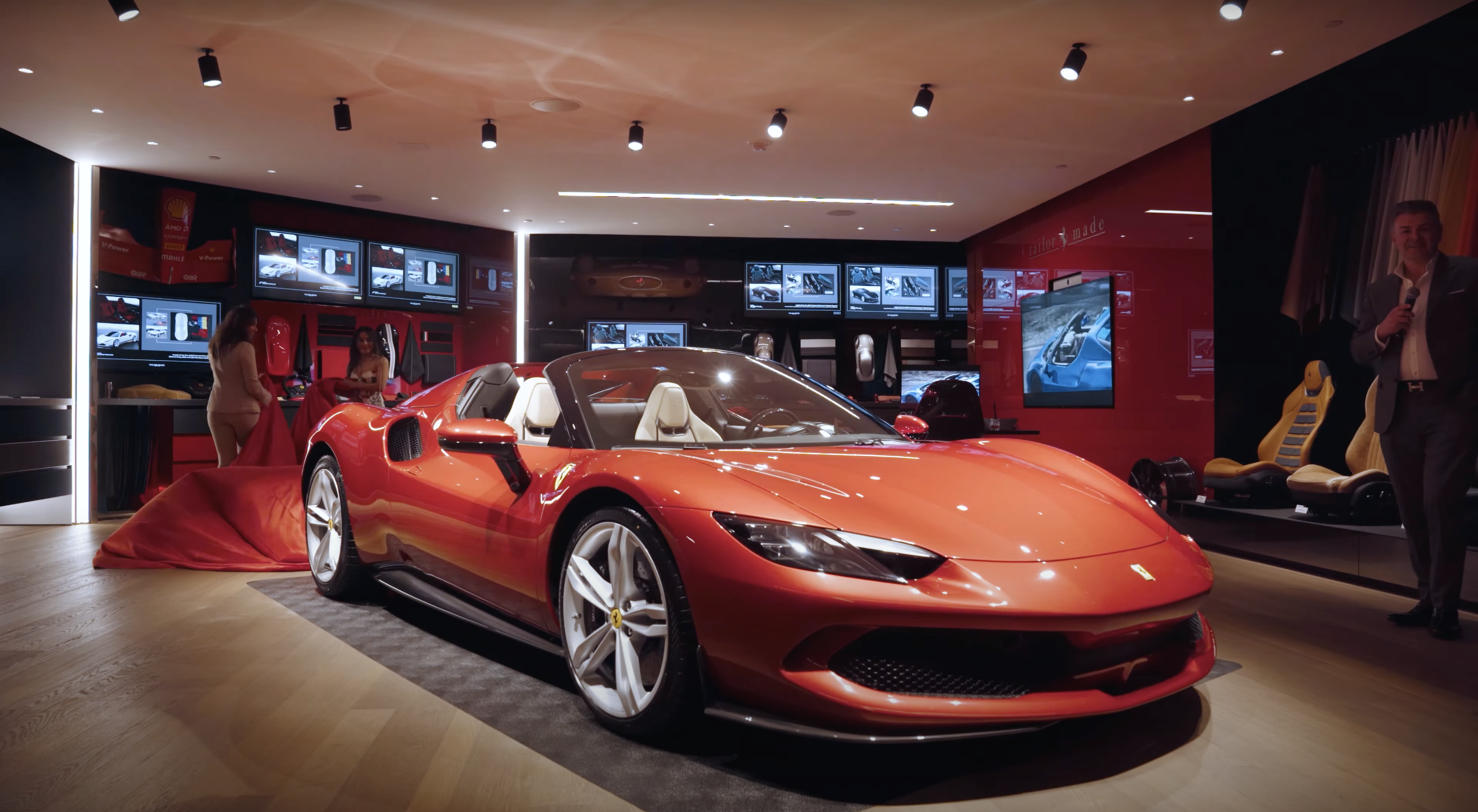

=== Speciale ===
The 296 Speciale is a high-performance version of the 296, announced in April 2025. The 2.9 L twin-turbo engine is tuned to 515 kW; 690 hp (700 PS), and the hybrid powertrain has a combined 647 kW; 868 hp (880 PS). The car's dry weight is 1,410 kg (3,109 lb) and 1,460 kg (3,219 lb) for the coupe and folding hardtop versions respectively. The 296 Speciale has an announced 20% additional downforce over the base model.

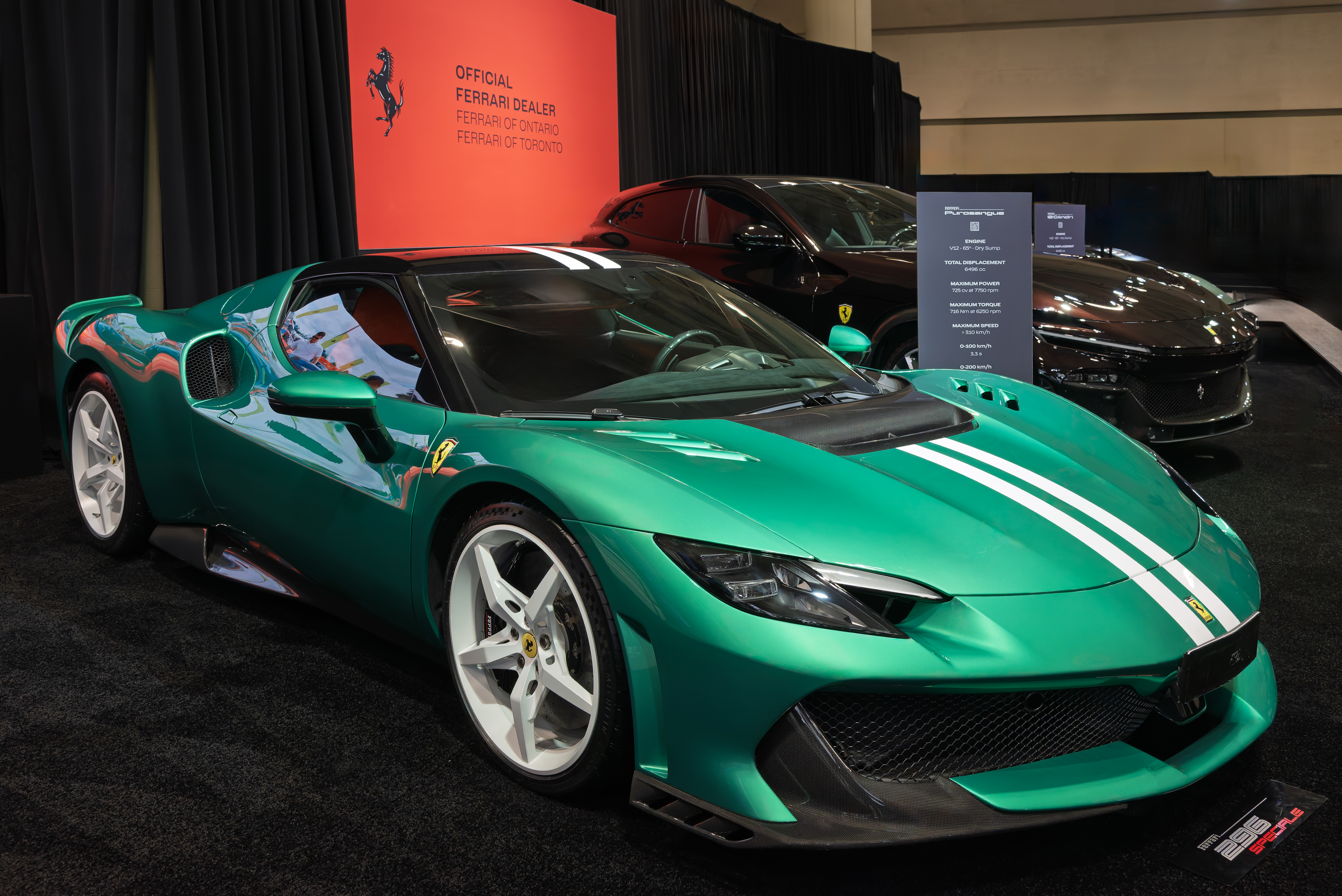

=== Speciale Piloti ===
The Ferrari 296 Speciale Piloti was presented on the occasion of the 2025 24 Hours of Le Mans. The car's livery recalls the yellow and red colors of the Ferrari 499P that races in the Hypercar class and is a tribute to the victories obtained at Le Mans.

=== GT Modificata ===
Ferrari in September 2026 unveiled the Ferrari 296 GT Modificata, an extreme, track-only special based on the 296 GT3 Evo race car but completely freed from motorsport regulations to deliver 730 horsepower.

=== Challenge Stradale ===
Ferrari unveiled the non-hybrid 670 hp 296 Challenge Stradale on November 21, 2026, at the Finali Mondiali event in Barcelona, cutting 140 kg by removing the plug-in hybrid system.

=== Challenge Evo ===
Ferrari unveiled the track-only 296 Challenge Evo alongside its non-hybrid road-legal sibling, the Challenge Stradale, at the 2026 Finali Mondiali in Barcelona on November 21, 2026. Built as the tenth model in Ferrari Challenge history, the 700 cv V6 race car introduces upgraded aerodynamics, a low-drag mode, and revised electronics ahead of its 2027 racing debut.

== Promotion ==
To promote the launch of the 296 GTB, Ferrari collaborated with Epic Games in July 2021 to add the Ferrari 296 GTB as a drivable vehicle to the online battle royale video game Fortnite Battle Royale, as part of Chapter 2: Season 7 of the game. The 296 GTB was removed from the game after the end of the season in October 2021.

== Motorsport ==
=== 296 GT3 ===
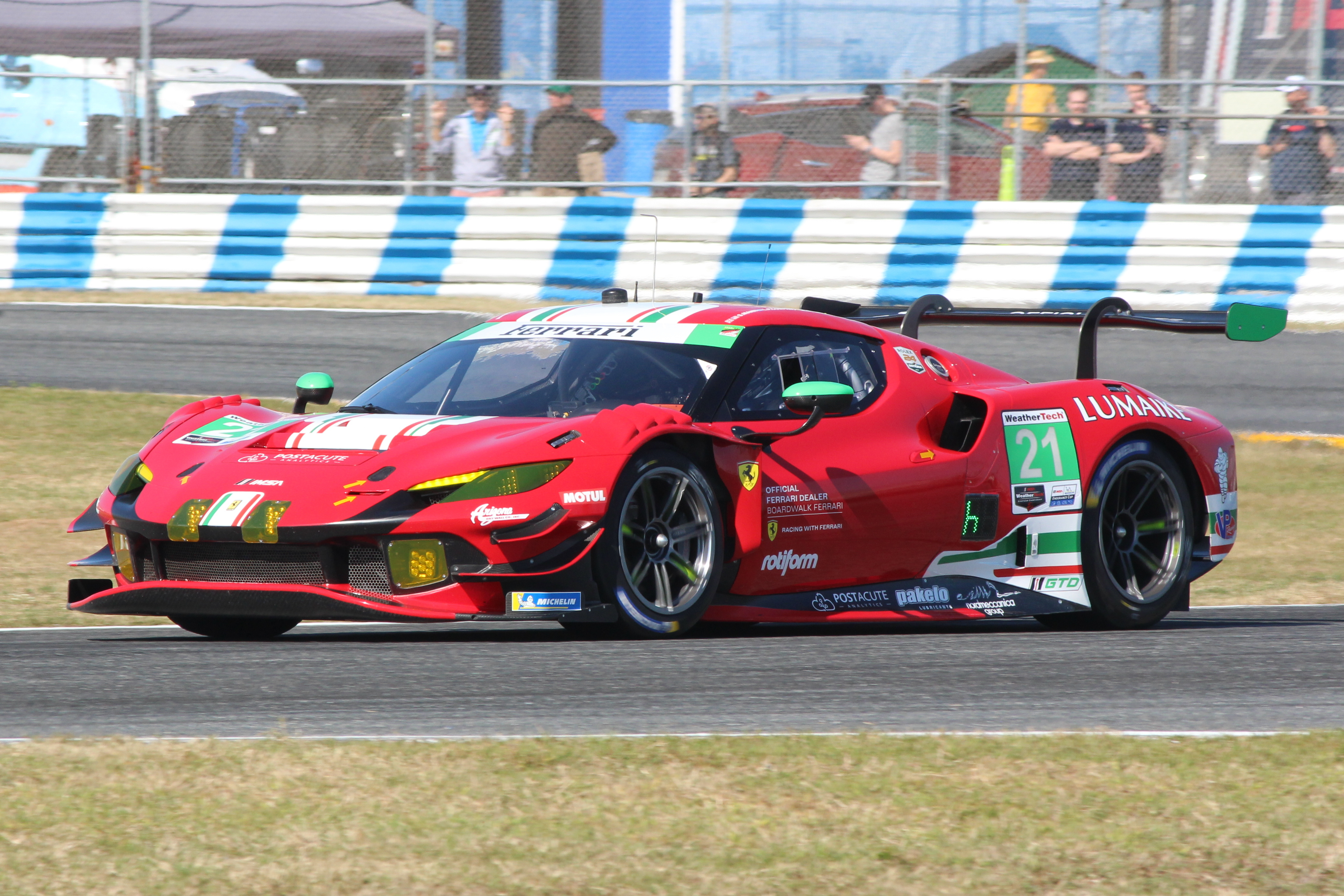
The No.21 AF Corse Ferrari 296 GT3 debuts in class GTD at the 2023 24 Hours of Daytona.

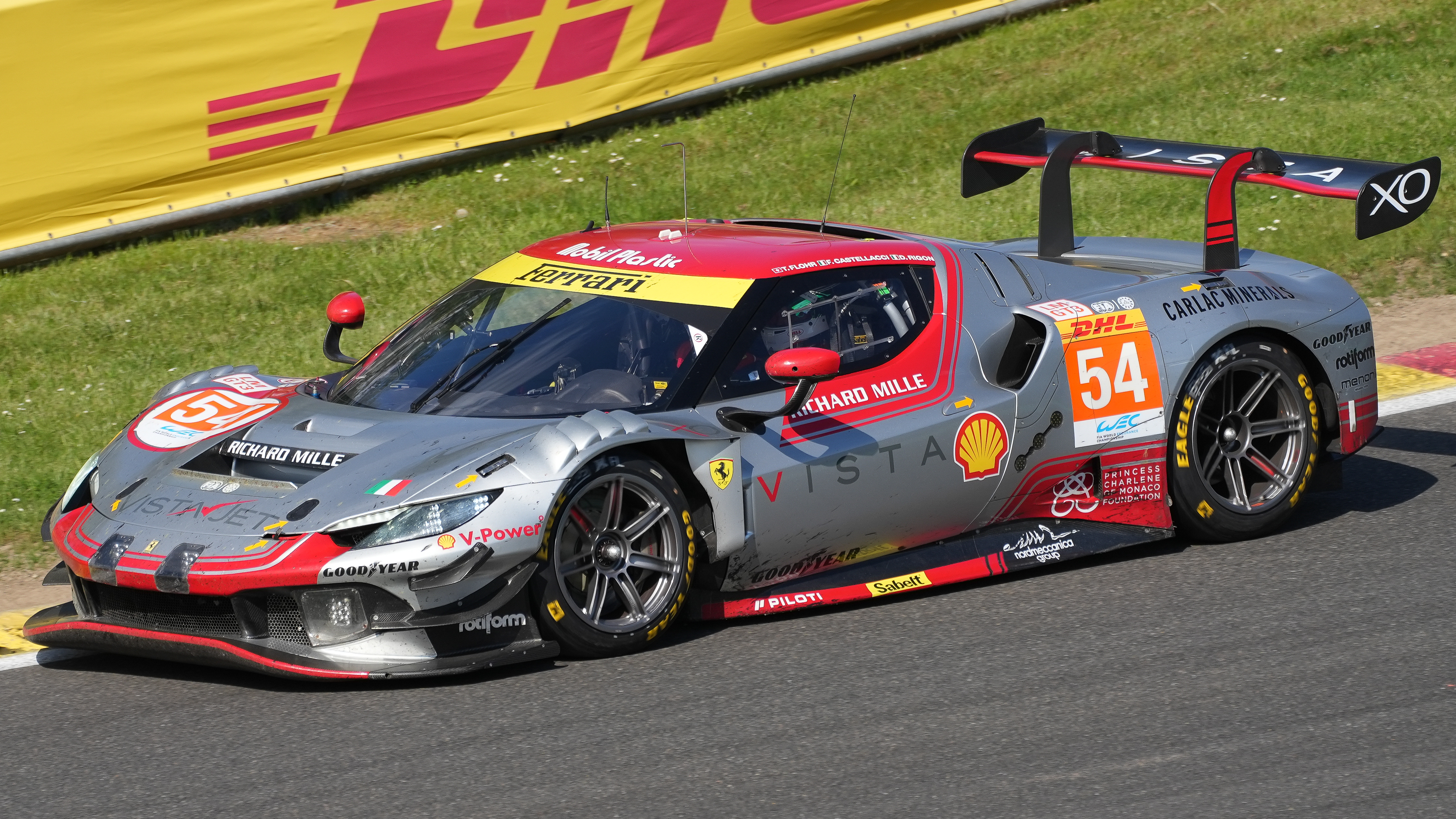
The No.54 Vista AF Corse Ferrari 296 GT3 at 2024 6 Hours of Spa-Francorchamps

In 2022, Ferrari introduced the 296 GT3, intended to replace the Ferrari 488 GT3 from 2023 onwards. The car is developed by Oreca and made its racing debut at the 2023 24 Hours of Daytona.

On 21 May 2023, the Ferrari 296 GT3 of Frikadelli Racing won the 2023 24 Hours of Nürburgring, completing a total of 162 laps and setting a new distance record. On 28 January 2024, the Ferrari 296 GT3 of Risi Competizione achieved the GTD PRO class victory at the 2024 24 Hours of Daytona. On September 15, 2024, the No.54 Vista AF Corse Ferrari 296 GT3 took the LMGT3 class victory at the 2024 6 Hours of Fuji. On 2 November 2024, the No.55 Vista AF Corse Ferrari 296 GT3 achieved the second LMGT3 class victory at 2024 8 Hours of Bahrain. On November 30, 2024, Alessandro Pier Guidi and Alessio Rovera won the drivers' championship in the 2024 GT World Challenge Europe Endurance Cup with the No.51 Ferrari 296 GT3. While AF Corse won the teams' championship in the 2024 GT World Challenge Europe Endurance Cup. Furthermore, the No.93 Ferrari 296 GT3 of team Sky – Tempesta Racing took both the drivers’ and teams championships in the Bronze class at the 2024 GT World Challenge Europe Endurance Cup.

Australian drivers Liam Talbot and Chaz Mostert won the 2024 GT World Challenge Australia in their Arise Racing 296 GT3, only the second time following 2007 when Danish driver Allan Simonsen won in both a 360 GT and a 430 GT3, that a Ferrari has won the Australian GT Championship which was first held in 1960.

On 4 May 2025, in the 2025 GT World Challenge Europe Sprint Cup, Brands Hatch, Kent, Race 1, the No.69 Ferrari 296 GT3 Emil Frey Racing took pole position and gold class victory, while the No.51 Ferrari 296 GT3 AF Corse - Francorchamps Motors took the overall victory, driven by Vincent Abril and Alessio Rovera, with the No.52 Ferrari 296 GT3 AF Corse - Francorchamps Motors also taking the silver victory.

On 10 May 2025, 2025 6 Hours of Spa-Francorchamps, Ferrari took the LMGT3 class victory with the No.21 Ferrari 296 GT3.

On 16 November 2025, No.50 Ferrari 296 GT3 won the 2025 FIA GT World Cup driven by Antonio Fuoco, taking Ferrari's first win in Macau.

=== 296 GT3 Evo ===
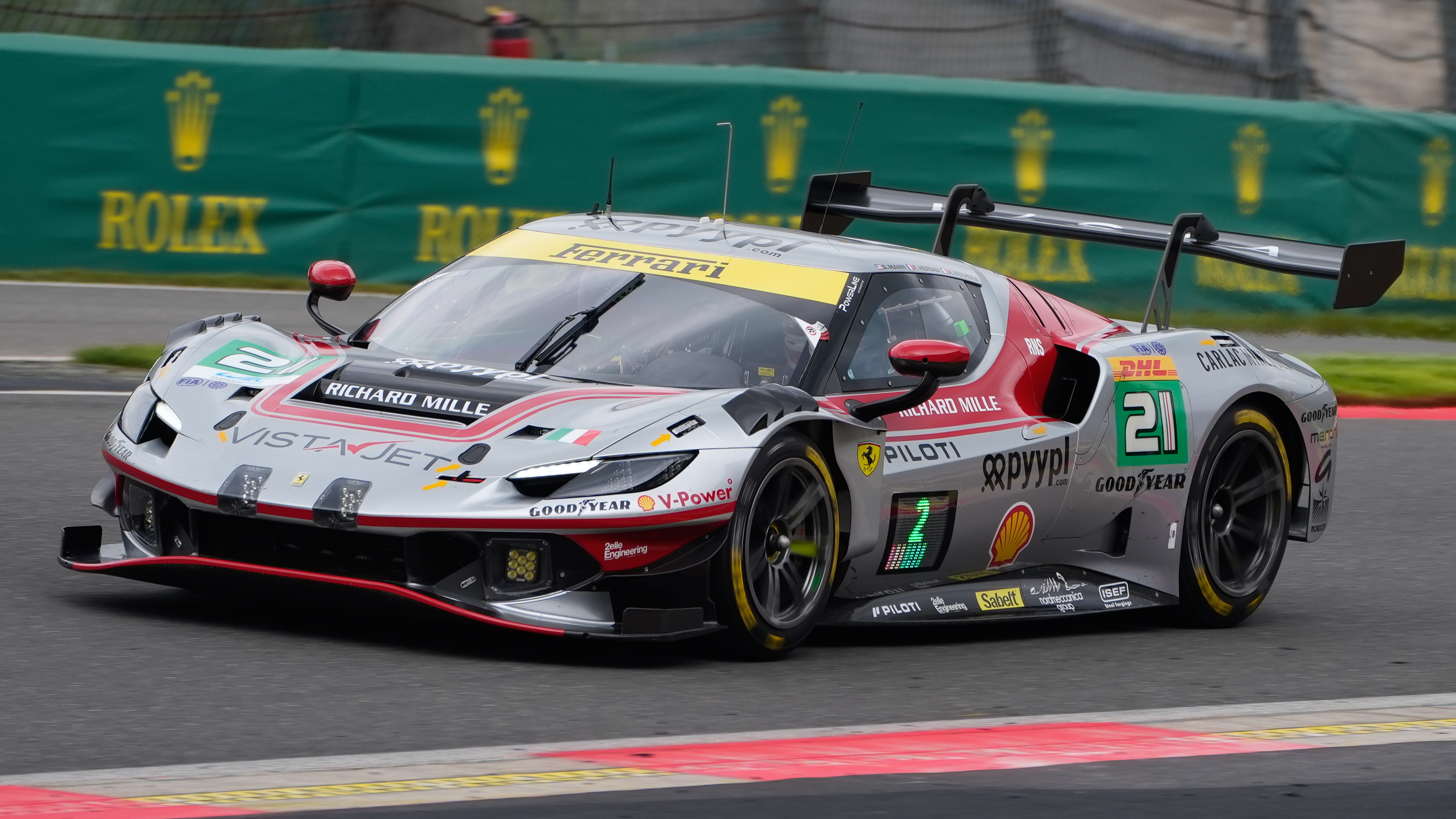
The No. 21 AF Corse 296 GT3 Evo during the 2026 6 Hours of Spa-Francorchamps

On 27 June 2025, Ferrari announced the Evo version of the 296 GT3 at the 24 Hours of Spa, with a target debut of 2026. The car features multiple upgrades over the original model such as a new gear ratio cascade to favor torque delivery at both low and high speeds, improved cooling, including two air intakes on the hood to improve cooling for the brakes and cockpit, and a new rear wing with a redesigned support structure and side panels. The Evo package made its first race appearance at the 2026 24 Hours of Daytona.

=== 296 Challenge ===
In February 2023, the Ferrari 296 Challenge was first spotted testing at Monza. The car was later unveiled during the 2023 Ferrari Finali Mondiali in October. The car made its debut in the 2024 Ferrari Challenge.

== See also ==
- List of production cars by power output
