= Radial flux motor =

Type of electric motor

A radial flux motor generates flux perpendicular to the axis of rotation. By contrast, an axial flux motor generates flux parallel to the axis.

== Design ==
The features of a radial flux motor are placed on the sides. The copper windings are wrapped around slots. A traditional radial flux BLDC motor places a rotor made of permanent magnets inside the stator. The stator contains support known as a yoke, which is outfitted with "teeth", individually wrapped with electromagnetic coils. The teeth function as alternating magnetic poles. The rotor’s magnetic poles interact with the alternating magnetic flux of the teeth, producing torque.

The use of grain-oriented steel in radial flux motors is challenging due to the curving geometry of the magnetic flux path.

=== Permanent magnet motors ===
Radial flux motors typically use less permanent magnet material, at the cost of lower torque density.

== Torque, speed, power ==
Torque, speed, and power are related by:

$P = T * \omega$

where P is mechanical power, T is torque, in Newton-metres, and ω is speed in radians/second.

== Thermal management ==
While permanent magnent radial flux motors offer considerably higher power than induction motors, they produce more heat, which must therefore be removed. This occurs either via conduction or air/water cooling, depending on application requirements.
