= Flying Whales =

French aeronautic start-up company

- Industry: Aerospace
- Founded: 20 September 2012
- Founder: Sébastien Bougon
- Headquarters: Suresnes, France
- Revenue: 416,700 (2019)
- Website: www.flying-whales.com/en/home/

Flying Whales is a French aeronautic start-up developing an airship designed to be an environmentally-friendly solution for transporting heavy loads, such as wood logs or specific gear like wind-turbine blades, without ground-based infrastructure.

== History ==
Founded in 2012 by Sébastien Bougon, this project was initially dedicated to wood exploitation in partnership with the Office National des Forêts (ONF), the French organization in charge of public forest management.

The project was developed during a pre-study phase from 2013 to 2016. It was selected as one of the 34 plans under the Nouvelle France Industrielle program launched on September 12, 2013.

The French government and the regional government of Nouvelle-Aquitaine have invested €90 million in the company, which, as of May 2024, had not produced an airship. Originally announced for 2020, in 2024, the company projected that the prototype would be ready in 2028.

After the Canadian federal government blocked Quebec's participation in the project due to partial Chinese ownership of the company, Flying Whales organized a buyout of Aviation Industry Corporation of China (AVIC)'s 25% stake in September 2021.

In July 2022, the company announced that it had raised 122 million euros to finalize the development of the LCA60T. Investors in this round include the Government of France via the French public investment bank Bpifrance, as part of the France 2030 program designed to revive the French industrial sector. The other investors are the Principality of Monaco with the Société Nationale de Financement, as well as Air Liquide's ALIAD venture capital fund, the Groupe ADP and Société Générale Assurances.

In February 2023, the startup joined the Next40.

A fourth fundraising round of 150 to 200 million euros was launched in 2024, aimed at financing the company's operations until the airships enter into service. Flying Whales was targeting a closing by the end of the first half of 2025, but as of January 2026, no public announcement had confirmed the successful completion of the transaction.

On September 13, 2025, a favorable opinion was issued by the public inquiry commission for the construction of a large assembly plant in Laruscade, in northern Gironde. The facility is planned to cover 75 hectares of natural land, located 40 km north of Bordeaux, and Flying Whales announced its intention to create 300 direct jobs.

In 2025, no airship prototype had yet been built. The company states on its official website that it plans to begin test flights starting in 2027, with commercial service envisaged for 2029.

=== LCA60T ===
Conceived as a means of transport to open up regions inaccessible by road, the LCA60T could become the largest active aircraft, 200 meters long and 50 meters high, according to Bougon. In 2025, the company announced that Evolito Ltd would supply the axial flux motors for the aircraft.

== Reception ==
=== Project Viability ===
Some observers and experts have expressed doubts about the viability of the project's technology and economics, and the credibility of the announced timelines. For instance, in 2020 the Quebec press reported negative assessments from experts at the Quebec Aerospace Research and Innovation Consortium (CRIAQ), one of whom stated, "it will never take off". The Quebec Minister of the Economy at the time, Dominique Anglade, subsequently refused to invest in the project.

A report by the Regional Economic, Social and Environmental Council (CESER) of Nouvelle-Aquitaine, published in June 2024, highlighted the absence of a documented market study, a relatively low level of technological maturity (estimated between TRL 4 and TRL 6), uncertainties regarding the actual number of jobs to be created, and a high financial risk.

In December 2025, criticisms regarding the transparency of public commitments were raised in the Quebec press, as certain information concerning the project's costs and expected benefits had not been made public.

== See also ==
- CargoLifter
