= Drive eO =

Company based in Latvia

- Type: Private limited company
- Founded: 2011
- Headquarters: Ogresgala pagasts, Ogre Municipality, Latvia
- Website: www.driveeo.com

Drive eO is an engineering company which operates from Latvia and specializes in development of electric and hybrid electric prototype vehicles for demanding applications. It was founded in 2011 to create the first ever hybrid electric rally car OSCar eO for the 2012 Dakar Rally. Driven by Māris Saukāns and Andris Dambis, it successfully completed the rally.

The company went on to develop a number of electric racing cars for participation at the Pikes Peak International Hill Climb. In 2015, the one-megawatt eO PP03 race car driven by Rhys Millen set a new EV record and became the first ever all-electric vehicle to win the event overall.

== OSCar eO ==
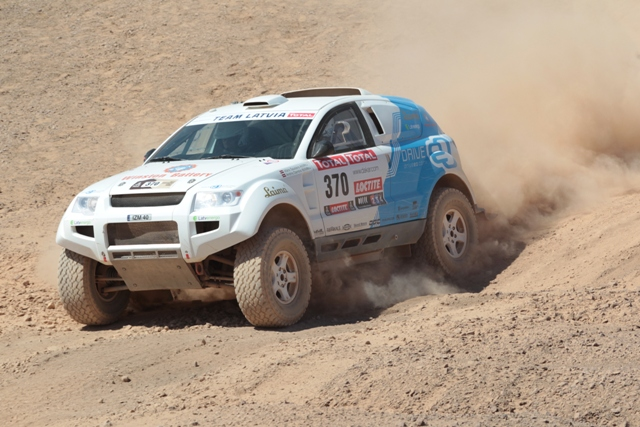
OSCar eO at the 2012 Dakar Rally

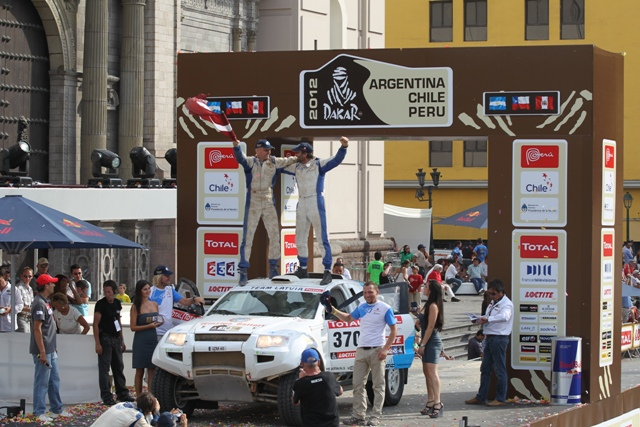
OSCar eO on the 2012 Dakar Rally finish podium in Lima

The car is based on the platform of all wheel drive OSCar O3 rally raid car manufactured by OSC. It features a series hybrid drivetrain. Drive eO gives the following vehicle specification:

Drive motor	PMSM with 2 power inverters, torque 440 Nm nominal / 800 Nm peak, power 150 kW nominal / 335 kW peak
Chassis controller	eO master controller
Battery pack	Winston Battery Li-ion with battery management system, nominal voltage 512 Vdc, total energy 51.2 kWh
Range extender	PMSM 1 power inverter, nominal output 80 kW, driven by Nissan VQ35DE IC engine, 240 litre safety fuel tank
Charger	10 kW off-board battery balancer / charger
Range	Up to 1000 km (terrain dependent)
Gearbox	6-speed sequential dog-engagement gearbox
Gross weight	2800 kg

OSCar eO has participated in three international rally raids:

Year	Rally	Route	Crew	Category result	Overall finish position	Cars at finish	Cars at start
2012	Dakar Rally	Mar del Plata - Copiapo - Lima	Māris Saukāns / Andris Dambis	Runner-up in NRJ Challenge	77	78	161
2012	Silk Way Rally	Moscow - Gelendzhik	Andris Dambis / Māris Saukāns	Winner of Green Challenge	21	60	81
2013	Africa Eco Race	Saint Cyprien - Dakar	Māris Saukāns / Uldis Dzenis	Winner of Experimental Category	8	33	39

== eO PP01 ==
The car features an all wheel drive electric drivetrain with one inboard mounted direct drive motor per wheel. It is based on a tubular spaceframe chassis with bodywork derived from Aquila CR1 racing car. Drive eO gives the following vehicle specification:

Drive motor	Four liquid cooled YASA-750 electric motors, total peak power 400 kW / peak torque 3000 Nm
Motor controller	Four liquid cooled SEVCON electric motor controllers
Chassis controller	eO master controller
Battery pack	eO 50 kWh custom battery pack with integrated BMS
Charger	eO 80 kW off-board DC charger
Total mass	1050 kg

The car was driven at the 2013 Pikes Peak International Hill Climb by Latvian and Baltic touring car champion Jānis Horeliks. The adverse weather conditions had made the track surface slippery and he went off-road after losing grip in a left hand corner at the Halfway Picnic Grounds. A documentary called "Uzvaras cena" has been produced about the project and was first aired in September 2013 on LTV7 during motoring programme "Tavs auto".

== eO PP02 ==
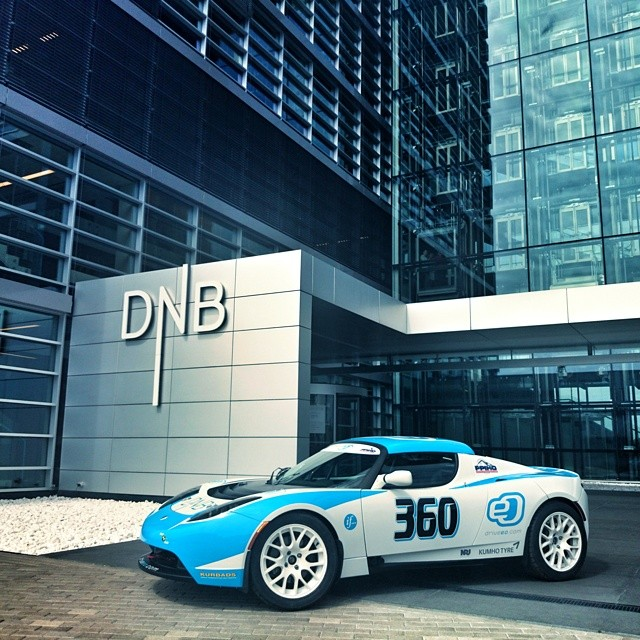
eO PP02 based on Tesla Roadster chassis

Drive eO returned to the Pikes Peak International Hill Climb in 2014 with a race car based on a Tesla Roadster chassis. This was the first time that Tesla brand was represented at a major international motorsport event. The original chassis was retained but the entire drive train was replaced by Drive eO to validate the new components ahead of scaling them up for successive electric supercar projects. The car was again piloted by Janis Horeliks and he completed the course in 12 minutes and 57.536 seconds to rank fifth in the Electric Modified division.

Drive eO gives the following vehicle specification:

Drive motor	Liquid cooled YASA electric motor, total peak power 360 kW / peak torque 800 Nm
Chassis controller	eO master controller
Battery pack	eO 40 kWh custom battery pack with integrated BMS
Total mass	1060 kg

== eO PP03 ==
As the next step, Drive eO developed an entirely new vehicle eO PP03 for the 93rd running of Pikes Peak International Hill Climb on June 28, 2015. The vehicle featured a one-megawatt electric drive train and all-wheel drive transmission. The team signed Rhys Millen to drive the car and was aiming for overall victory.

Drive train	Six YASA electric motors with Drive eO controllers, total peak power 1020 kW / peak torque 2160 Nm
Battery pack	50 kWh lithium-ion battery pack with BMS
Transmission	All-wheel drive, limited slip axle differentials, single reduction gear
Chassis	Steel tubular spaceframe with carbon fibre body
Steering	Electrically assisted power steering
Suspension	4-way adjustable shock absorbers
Brakes	Ventilated brake discs Ø378 mm front, Ø330 mm rear
Tyres & wheels	320/710 R18 slick tyres, 13 in × 18 in (330 mm × 460 mm) wheels
Total mass	1150 kg
Top speed	260 km/h

On the race day Rhys Millen completed the course in 9 minutes and 7.222 seconds, setting a new EV record and becoming the overall winner.

== eO PP100 ==
In 2016, the car had Peak power 1,190 kilowatts (1,600 hp) and peak torque 2520 Nm, with a weight of 1200 kg. Millen set a record of 8:57.118.
