= Evolito Ltd =

British electric motor manufacturer

Evolito Ltd.
- Formerly: Spin-off from YASA Limited
- Founded: June 2021
- Headquarters: Bicester, Oxfordshire
- Website: Official website

Evolito Ltd. is a British aerospace company that develops axial-flux electric motors, motor controller units, and battery management systems for aviation applications. The company operates a 40,000-square-foot (3,716-square-meter) manufacturing and testing facility in Bicester, Oxfordshire.

The company focuses on developing axial-flux electric propulsion systems, aiming to support sustainable aviation, with a focus on advanced air mobility applications and hybrid adaptations of existing aircraft platforms.

== History ==
Evolito was established in June 2021 when YASA Limited, a company that developed axial-flux electric motor technology, was acquired by Mercedes-Benz. As part of the acquisition, YASA separated its aerospace division from the original company, creating a separate entity known as Evolito to focus on the development of axial-flux motor technology for aviation markets.

In November 2023, Evolito received Design Organization Approval (DOA) from the Civil Aviation Authority (CAA) for electric propulsion systems from the Civil Aviation Authority (CAA) for electric propulsion systems.

In 2022, Evolito purchased Gloucestershire-based aerospace battery developer Electroflight.

In January 2025, Evolito was awarded 3rd place in the Sunday Times 100 fastest growing UK tech companies In February 2025, Evolito secured a contract to supply 32 D250 axial-flux motors for French airship start-up Flying Whales' LCA60T airship, with entry into service expected in 2028.

== Products ==
=== D250 ===
The D250 motor provides 240 kw (332 hp) of peak power in a 13 kg (29 lb) package, yielding a best-in-class 18.5 kw/kg.

== Leadership and recognition ==
As of 2025, the leadership team includes CEO Dr. Chris Harris, co-founder and Chief Executive Officer (CEO); Marc Holme, the Chief Technology Officer (CTO); Ajay Lukha, the Chief Commercial Officer (CCO); Robert Sharman, the Chief Operating Officer (COO); Rachael Wallwork, the Chief People Officer (CPO), Nicola Johnson, the Director of Finance, James Wilby, the Head of IT and Gareth Morris previously COO is an advisor to the CEO.

== Markets ==
Competitors in the electric propulsion market include magniX, Rolls-Royce Electrical, and Joby Aviation. Market research valued the global aircraft electric motor industry at $6.5 billion in 2022 and is projected to grow to $14.5 billion by 2032.

== See also ==
- YASA Limited
- Axial flux motor
- Flying Whales
- Electric aircraft
- Advanced air mobility
