= Koenigsegg Regera =

Swedish hybrid grand touring sports car

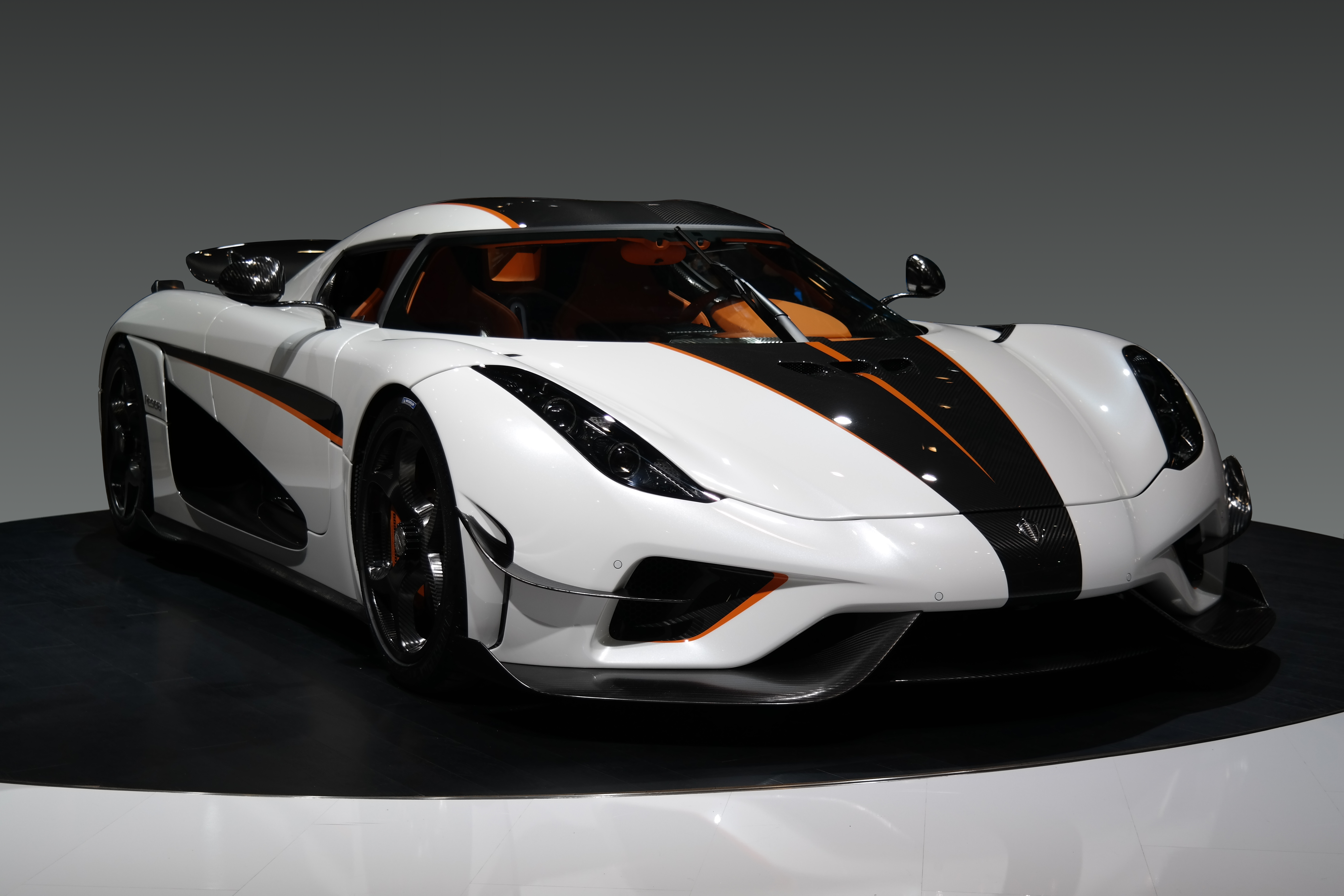
- Koenigsegg Regera with 'Ghost' package

Overview
- Manufacturer: Koenigsegg Automotive AB
- Production: March 2016–2022 (80 built)
- Assembly: Ängelholm, Sweden
- Designer: Christian von Koenigsegg; Joachim Nordwall

Body and chassis
- Class: Sports car/Grand tourer (S)
- Body style: 2-door targa top
- Layout: Longitudinal, mid-engine, rear-wheel-drive
- Doors: Dihedral Synchro-Helix

Powertrain
- Engine: 5.0 L twin-turbocharged V8
- Electric motor: 2 YASA 750 R motors; 1 YASA P400 motor
- Power output: 1,119 kW (1,500 hp; 1,521 PS) (combined); 1,310 kW (1,781 PS; 1,757 hp) (combined) 1.31MW Environmental Power Upgrade option
- Transmission: 1-speed fixed gear (2.73:1 ratio) (single-speed direct-drive)
- Hybrid drivetrain: PHEV
- Battery: 4.5 kWh liquid-cooled lithium-ion battery
- Electric range: 35 km (22 mi)
- Plug-in charging: 120 V, 240 V AC, Type 2 connector

Dimensions
- Wheelbase: 2,662 mm (104.8 in)
- Length: 4,560 mm (179.5 in)
- Width: 2,050 mm (80.7 in)
- Height: 1,110 mm (43.7 in)
- Kerb weight: 1,470 kg (3,240 lb) (dry); 1,590 kg (3,510 lb) (kerb); 1,570 kg (3,460 lb) (kerb, KNC)

The Koenigsegg Regera is a limited production, plug-in hybrid grand touring sports car manufactured by Swedish automotive manufacturer Koenigsegg. It was unveiled at the March 2015 Geneva Motor Show. The name Regera is a Swedish verb, meaning "to reign" or "to rule". Koenigsegg produced 85 Regeras, most of which were sold upon unveiling.

The Regera was developed and designed to be a more practical, luxurious, grand touring alternative to the rest of Koenigsegg's lightweight sports car lineup: initially the Agera and later the Jesko. Consequently it is focused on the smooth and instant delivery of power provided by its overhauled powertrain, rather than on-track performance.

The introduction of the Regera alongside the Agera RS in 2015 resulted in Koenigsegg for the first time simultaneously having two models in production. This role was passed from the Agera to the Jesko in 2019, which briefly shared the production line with the Regera when Jesko production began in late 2021.

Koenigsegg Regera accelerating

== Conception ==
Koenigsegg founder Christian von Koenigsegg purchased a Tesla Model S P85+ in 2013 and was impressed by the car's ability to instantly deliver power without the need for a downshift or to wait out turbo lag. He was especially impressed with the direct and intuitive experience provided by an electric car like the Tesla, remarking that the instantaneous response of the motors was something even a Formula One car could not attain with a traditional internal combustion engine. Von Koenigsegg sought to combine this desirable aspect of electric powertrains with the traditional Koenigsegg experience of a lightweight, powerful sports car.

Realizing some form of compromise was necessary, von Koenigsegg decided to look to a hybrid solution. By removing the traditional 7-speed dual-clutch transmission and switching to a single-gear direct-drive system, Koenigsegg mitigated the added weight of the three electric motors and a 4.5 kW·h battery pack installed in the Regera as compared to the previous Agera models.

=== Development ===
The Regera in NVIDIA Holodeck

The Regera was designed with a combination of the CATIA software suite and Autodesk Inventor, with AutoCAD Electrical being primarily used to redesign the vehicle's electrical systems from past Koenigsegg models. According to Koenigsegg Technical Director Jon Gunner, the Regera makes use of several power nodes to connect wiring throughout the car compared to the single power node of previous models, which saves weight.

Koenigsegg uses 3D printing technologies to manufacture many parts of the Regera. This includes static components like details in the interior of the car under the upholstery and the large electrical exhaust port at the rear of the car, as well as dynamic components like the variable-geometry turbocharger in the engine. This manufacturing technique allowed Koenigsegg to better tune airflow through the turbochargers and achieve a more complex inner housing shape which was impossible with conventional methods.

The Regera was used by NVIDIA to introduce Project Holodeck, a virtual reality environment capable of importing and manipulating high-detail 3D models. This technology was used by Koenigsegg engineers to collaborate on design ideas in real-time and could allow customers to experience their custom made vehicle in VR before it is purchased or built.

== Specifications ==
The Regera is a two-door targa top with a detachable roof that can be stowed in the boot. It is the first hybrid car to be produced by Koenigsegg, as well as the first vehicle to use their Direct-Drive System for power delivery. As the company's 'grand touring' oriented offer in their two-car lineup, the Regera focuses more on interior luxury and daily usability instead of hardcore track performance like the Jesko.

=== Powertrain ===
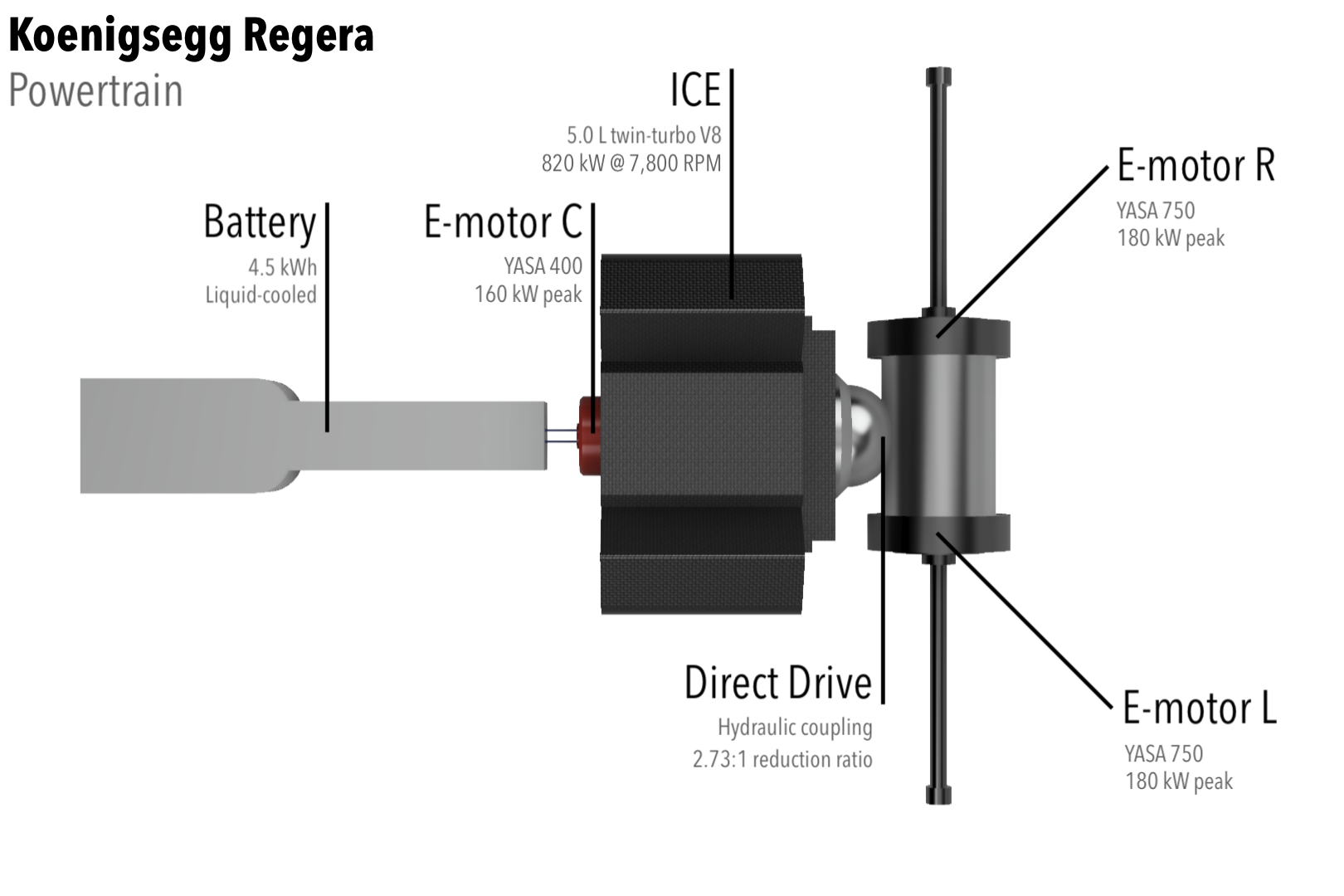
Diagram of the Regera's powertrain

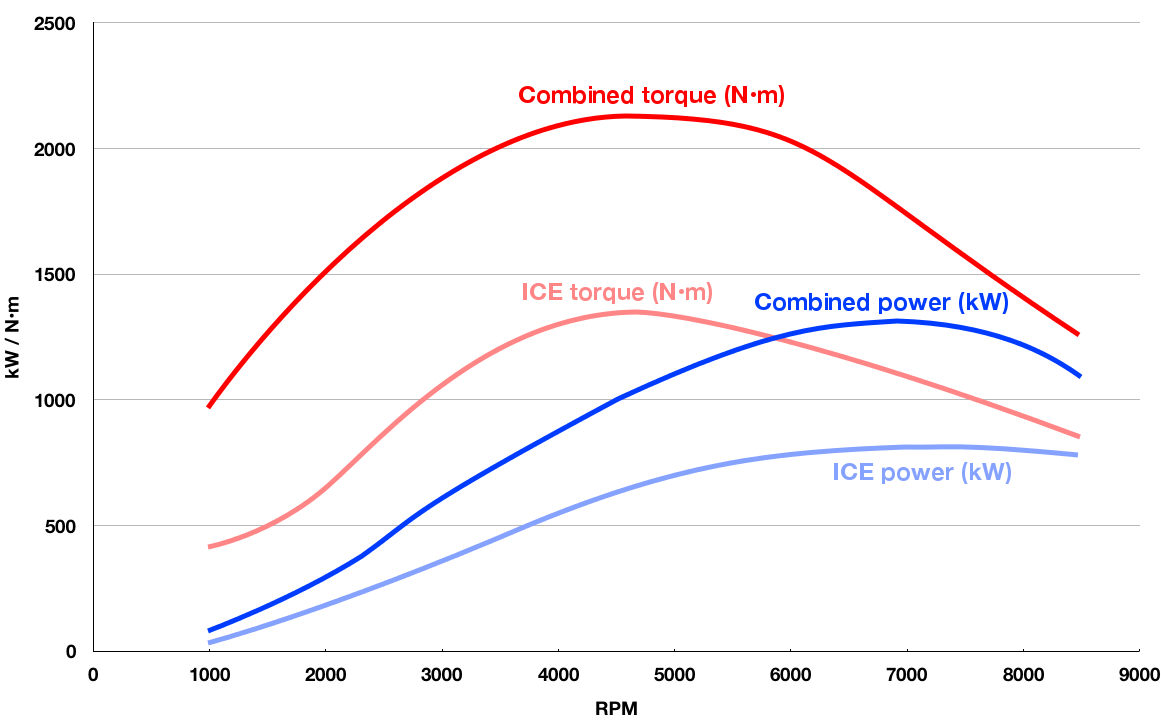
Power diagram of the Regera's ICE and hybrid system

The Regera has a reported total power output of 1,340 kW (1,797 hp; 1,822 PS) through a hybrid powertrain. As in general, the Regera's internal combustion engine (ICE) generates its greatest power only at high rpm; however, due to the fixed gear, this corresponds to very high speeds. Power at low speeds is filled in by the electric motors, giving a maximum combined mechanical power output of 1,119 kW (1,500 hp; 1,521 PS) and 2,000 N⋅m (1,475 lb⋅ft) of torque.

==== Internal combustion engine ====
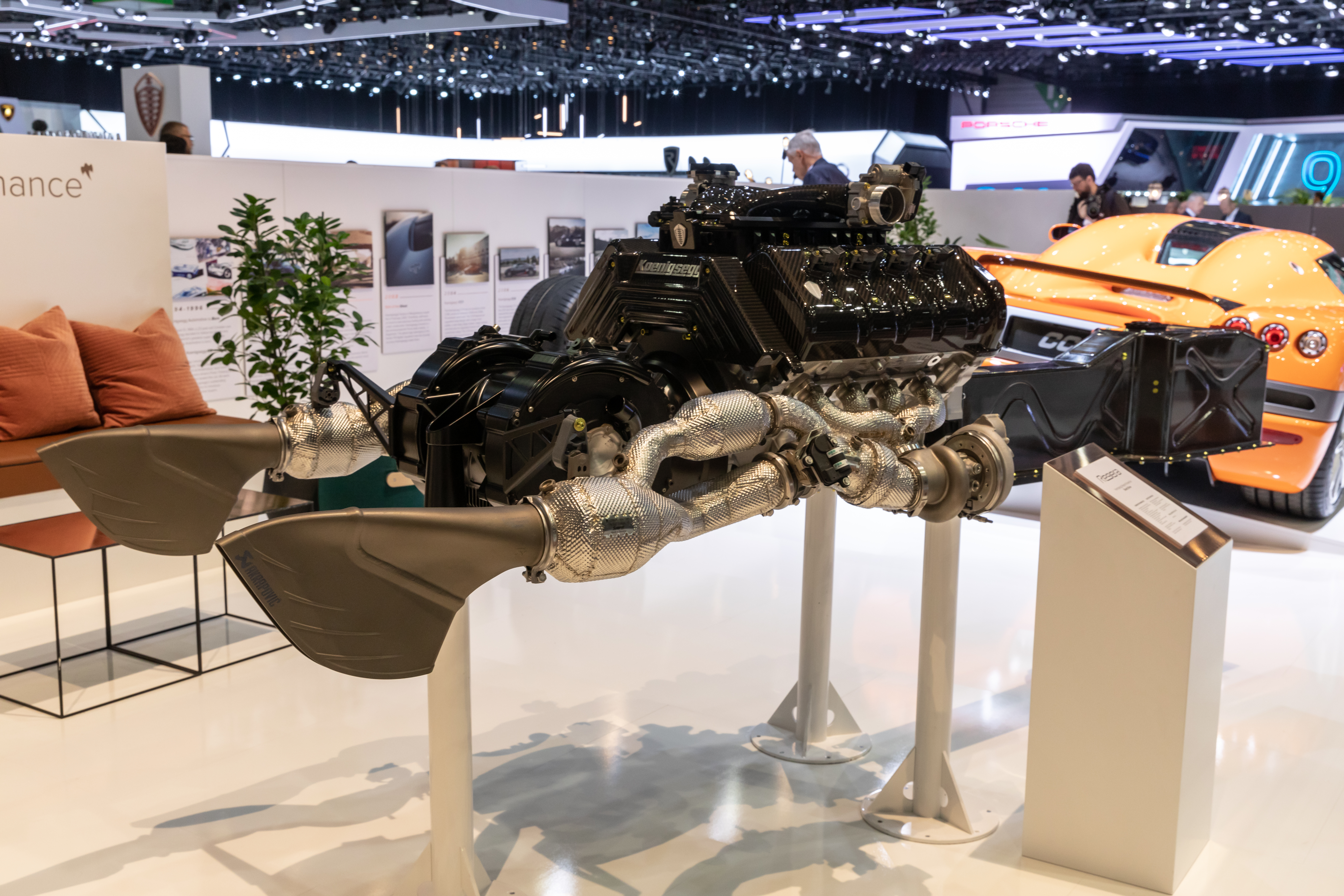
Regera engine and exhaust system on display at Geneva International Motor Show

The Internal Combustion Engine (ICE) is a mid-rear mounted, in-house developed, twin-turbocharged V8 engine with a 5.0-litre displacement. It has four valves per cylinder, each with a bore and stroke of 92 mm × 95.25 mm (3.62 by 3.75 inches) and a compression ratio of 9.3:1. The engine utilizes dry sump lubrication and dual overhead camshafts, and has a cylinder bank angle of 90º. It is rated at 820 kW (1,100 hp; 1,115 PS) at 7,800 rpm and 1,280 N⋅m (944 lb⋅ft) of torque at 4,100 rpm on 95 octane RON gasoline. A flex fuel sensor is installed in the fuel tank to detect E85 biofuel, which increases the power output to 1,120 kW (1,500 hp). The ICE is rev-limited at 8,250 rpm.

==== Electric motors ====
The ICE works in conjunction with three YASA electric motors with a total capacity of 520 kW (707 PS; 697 hp) and 900 N⋅m (664 lb⋅ft) of torque. One 160 kW (215 hp; 218 PS) YASA 400 Motor Generator Unit mounted on the crankshaft acts as starter and generator and supplies torque fill; and two 180 kW (241 hp; 244 PS) YASA 750 wheel-shaft mounted electric motors drive each rear wheel and provide torque vectoring and manages traction. The electric motors are powered by a 4.5 kWh, 800 volt, 75 kg (165 lb) liquid cooled battery pack developed by Rimac Automobili, making it the first 800-volt production car. Koenigsegg claims that the battery pack is the most power-dense battery pack ever created for a production car.

Under braking, the kinetic energy recovery system in the Regera can regenerate up to 150 kW of power to recharge the battery during operation.

=== Transmission ===
Christian von Koenigsegg invented the Koenigsegg Direct-Drive System (KDD), and it was developed for the Regera by the Koenigsegg Advanced Engineering Team. The KDD system effectively eliminates the need for a transmission and allows for pure EV (electric vehicle) mode. The Regera does not have a traditional multi-gear transmission but instead features a single-speed fixed-gear transmission, often called a direct-drive, with a 2.73:1 reduction ratio, meaning the crankshaft mounted on the ICE will rotate 2.73 times for every 1 time that the output shaft of the direct-drive mechanism will rotate.

At speeds below 30 mph (48 km/h), the wheel shaft electric motors mostly propel the car through the use of a hydraulic coupling that lets the ICE and the crankshaft mounted electric motor slip. In reverse, only the wheel shaft electric motors propel the car. Above 30 mph, the RPM of the crankshaft mounted electric motor and internal combustion engine are proportional to wheel speed through locking of the hydraulic coupling. However, Christian von Koenigsegg described and demonstrated how the Regera features a steering-wheel-mounted paddle that simulates a traditional downshift by initiating slip of the hydraulic coupling connecting the crankshaft to the output shaft. This results in higher RPM of the ICE and the crankshaft mounted electric motor and therefore higher power at lower speeds than what would have been possible if the coupling would have been locked at all times. Koenigsegg reported that the omission of a gearbox and addition of electric motors and battery only added 88 kg (194 lb) compared to what the Regera would have weighed with the same combustion engine but a 7-speed dual-clutch transmission (DCT) and no electric motors or batteries.

=== Suspension ===
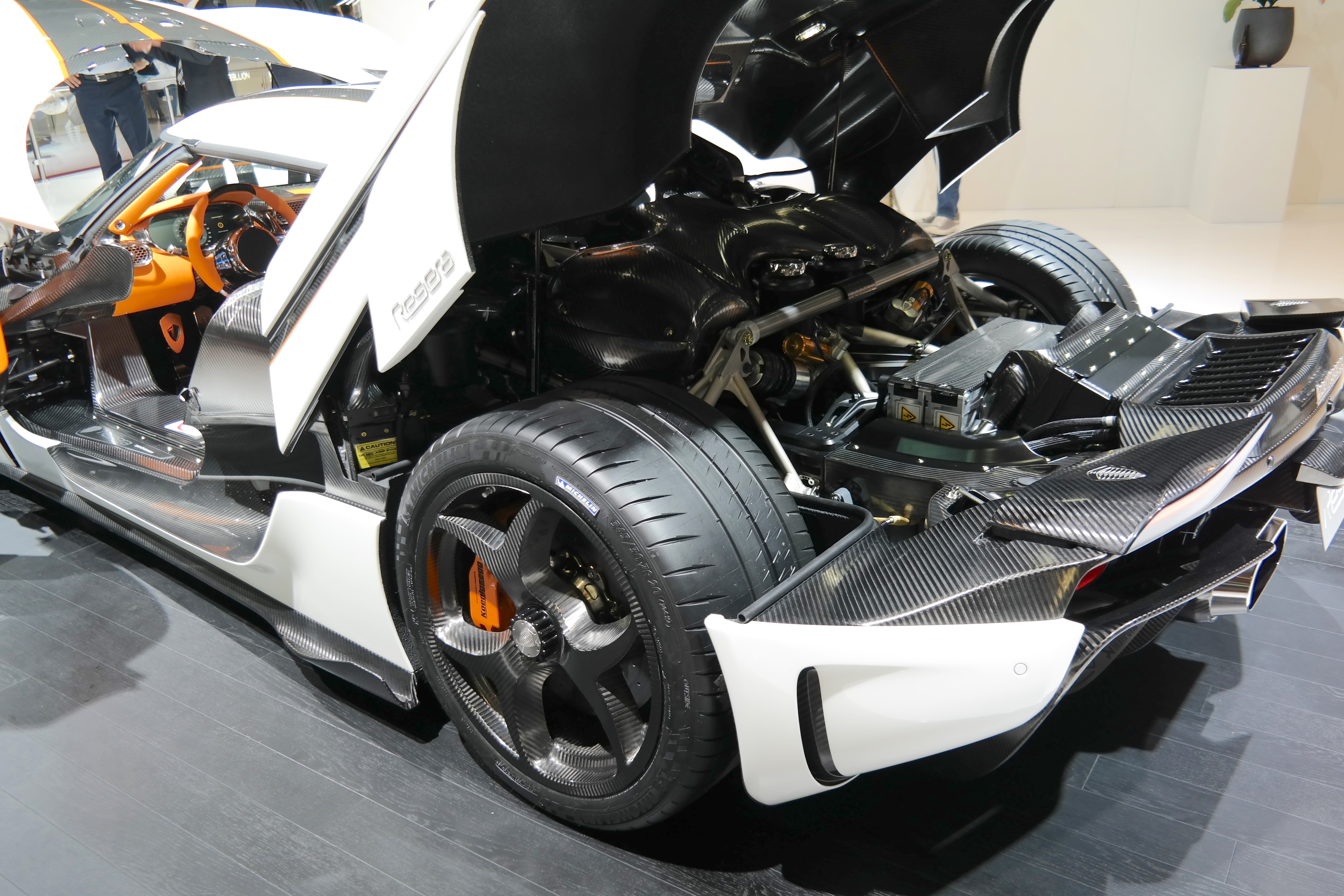
'Triplex' damper system

The Regera features a similar suspension layout to the preceding Agera models, with double wishbone suspension at the front and rear axles. The wishbones are manufactured from chrome-molybdenum steel tubes, which was chosen over carbon-fibre due to the significant cost and complexity of the latter option. The suspension incorporates special Z-shaped anti-roll bars that connect to the body at only one point (as opposed to two for traditional U-shaped bars). Also returning from the Agera models is Koenigsegg's 'Triplex' damper system, which consists of three custom Öhlins shock absorbers on the rear suspension subsystem. While anti-dive forces under heavy braking are achieved by obliquely mounting the top wishbones in the front of the car, this mounting position could not be achieved in the rear. Therefore, the purpose of the third 'Triplex' rear damper is to provide anti-squat forces under hard acceleration.

=== Wheels ===
The Regera has aluminium wheels or carbon fibre wheels (optional) with diameters of 480 millimetres (19 in) at the front and 510 millimetres (20 in) at the rear with center-lock wheel nuts. The tyres are Michelin Pilot Sport 4S' with codes of 275/35 ZR 19 (100Y) for the front and 345/30 ZR 20 (106Y) for the rear. The car comes with track focused Michelin Pilot Sport Cup 2 tyres when equipped with the Ghost package. The brakes are ventilated carbon-ceramic discs, with a diameter of 397 mm (15.6 in) and six-piston calipers at the front along with a diameter of 380 mm (15.0 in) and four-piston calipers at the rear.

=== Aerodynamics ===
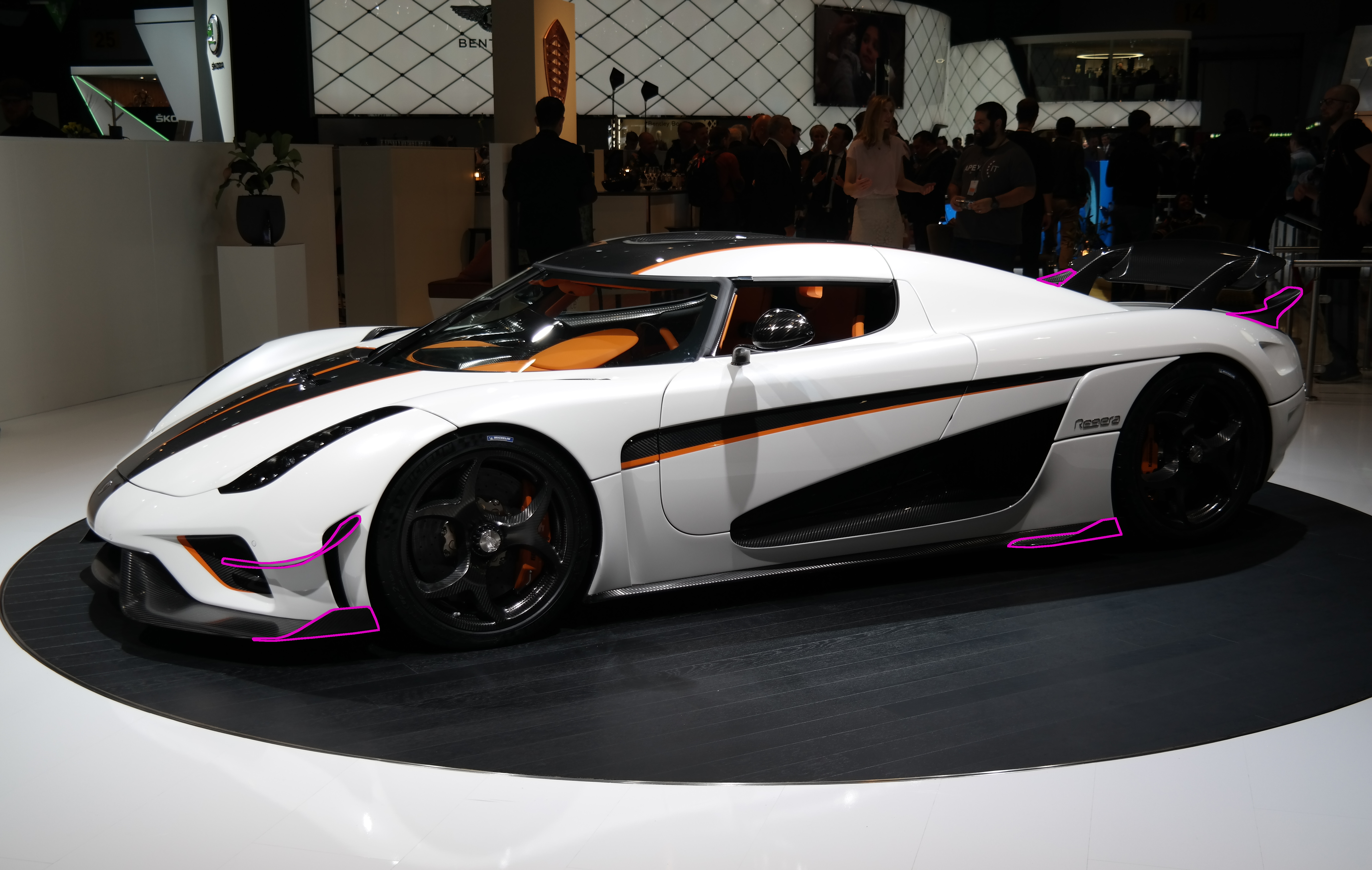
A Regera equipped with the optional 'Ghost' aerodynamic package (contents of the package highlighted for illustrative purposes)

Like its other production counterparts, the Regera is equipped with active aerodynamics for optimized downforce. At the rear is a foldable hydraulic wing, and at the front are active flaps that can modify the flow of air under the car. The manufacturer claims that the stock aerodynamic system is capable of generating 450 kg (990 lb) of downforce at 250 km/h (155 mph).

Before the 2018 Geneva Motor Show, Koenigsegg revealed the optional 'Ghost' package for the Regera. This package extends the front splitter and the side sills, adds canards to the front fenders, and adds fixed winglets to the rear quarter panels. Koenigsegg claims that, with the Ghost package installed, the downforce of the Regera is "increased by more than 20 percent".

=== Interior features ===
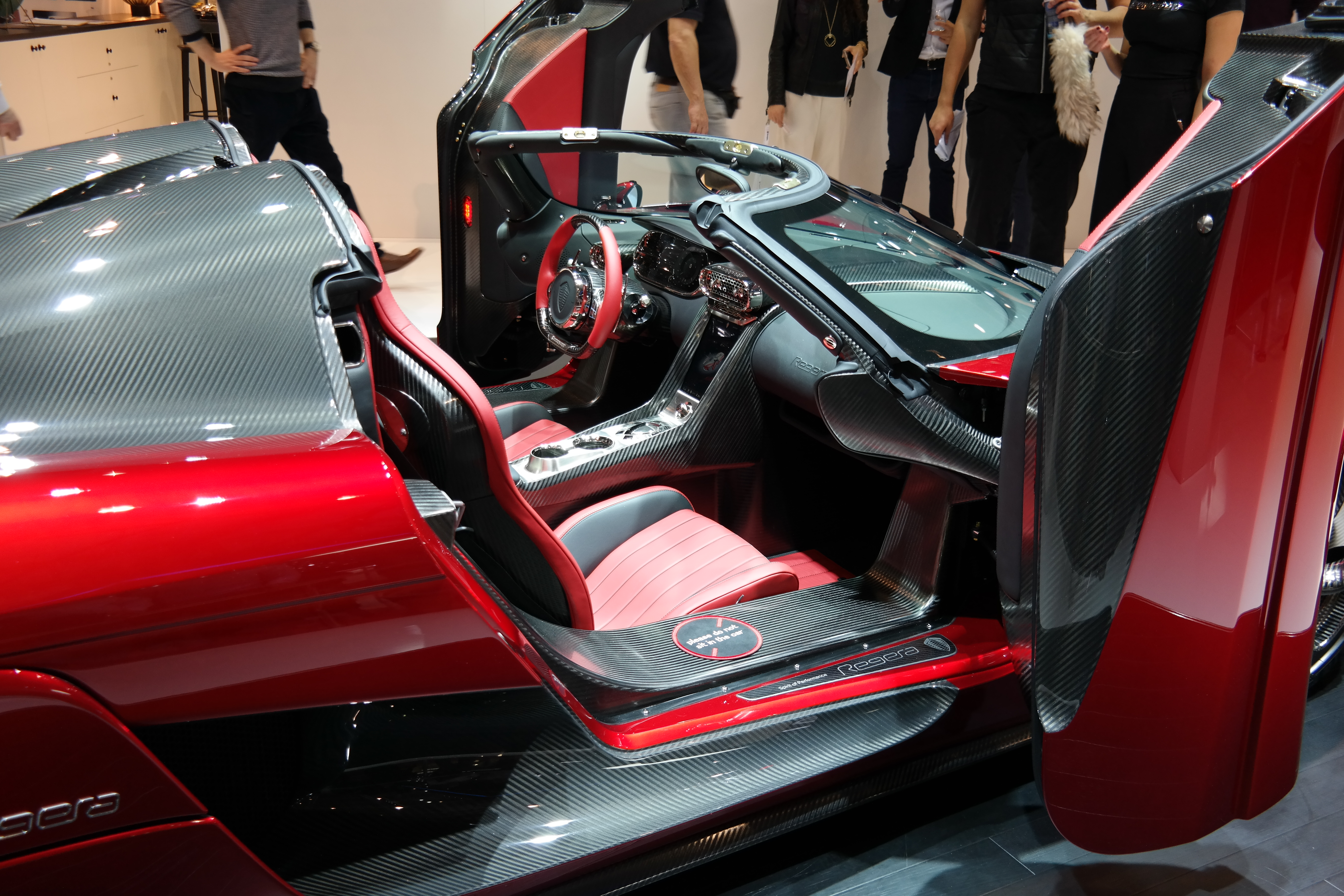
Interior with roboticized dihedral doors in open position

The Regera includes added insulation to help add to the luxury by reducing cabin noise caused by the wind and powertrain along with 8-way electrically adjustable memory foam seats included as an added luxury item over previous models. The Regera also includes many new technical features such as a Neonode 9-inch infrared infotainment system, a complete camera system with recording capabilities (front, inner, and rear), Apple CarPlay, a new sound system, ambient lighting, and 4G and Wi-Fi connectivity. It also features front and rear parking sensors.

The wireless connectivity capabilities of the Regera allow for Koenigsegg to send over-the-air firmware and software updates to each car as necessary. This allows for the remote modification of parameters such as the power band of the electric motors or throttle response without the need for physical work on the car.

The Regera has active engine mounts for the ICE and transmission to rest on. The engine mounts are designed to stay soft at lower speeds, significantly reducing vibrations and engine noise, adding to the luxury effect of the vehicle. While driving more aggressively or at higher speeds, the engine mounts will firm up, giving greater lateral response to the driver.

=== Exterior features ===
The day-time running lamps on the Regera were designed to resemble a constellation, with the carbon-fibre background resembling the night sky. In addition, the headlamps can actively vent out condensation through two small fans installed in each lamp. Koenigsegg claims that the Regera is the first "fully-robotized" car. All openings and wing mirrors are fitted with proximity sensors to safeguard against the doors striking nearby objects (curb, low roof, etc.) while opening or closing. The vehicle features hydraulic pumps and accumulators to control the active front and rear wings, as well as active chassis control and lifting. Hydraulic lifters were added to the already existing pumps and accumulators to allow for all body panels on the vehicle to be remotely operated.

The Regera uses a fishtail-style dual exhaust system designed by Akrapovič constructed of titanium, Inconel, and stainless steel. The large central exhaust pipe under the charging port is not used to vent exhaust from the ICE, rather, it expels hot air from the cooling system for the batteries and electronics in the car.

=== Performance ===
Koenigsegg states it is capable of accelerating to 100 km/h (62 mph) from a stand still in 2.8 seconds, 200 km/h (124 mph) in 6.6 seconds, 300 km/h (186 mph) in 10.9 seconds and attaining a speed of 400 km/h (249 mph) in 20 seconds. Koenigsegg also claims that the acceleration from 150–250 km/h (93–155 mph) requires 3.9 seconds.

The Regera has a power-to-weight ratio of 0.7 kW (0.94 hp) per kilogram, and the combined ICE and electric motors produce the highest combined peak power and torque output of any other production hybrid car.

== World record ==
On 23 September 2019, the Regera broke the 0–400–0 km/h (0–249–0 mph) acceleration record for a production car with a time of 31.49 seconds. This is 1.8 seconds faster than the previous record, also held by Koenigsegg but set by the Agera RS. The record was set in Råda Military Airfield in Lidköping, Sweden with a car driven by factory test driver Sonny Persson.

During the record attempt, the car accelerated from 0–400 km/h in 22.87 seconds over a distance of 1,613.2 m (5,292.7 ft) and decelerated to a controlled stop in 8.62 seconds over a distance of 435.26 m (1,428.0 ft). The total distance used for the record was 2,048.46 m (6,720.7 ft). The run was conducted over a combination of runway and taxiway due to insufficient track length and as a safety precaution.

On 16 June 2023, the Regera again broke the 0–400–0 km/h acceleration record with an improved time of 28.81 seconds. The new record attempt came one month after the Regera's first record was broken by the Rimac Nevera, which achieved a time of 29.93 seconds. The record was set at Örebro Airport by Koenigsegg development driver Markus Lundh, who cited improvements in the track surface and the new Michelin Cup 2 R tyres as reasons for the faster run.

Over the new record run, the car accelerated from 0–400 km/h in 20.68 seconds over a distance of 1,483 m (4,865.5 ft) and decelerated to a controlled stop in 8.13 seconds over a distance of 422 m (1,384.5 ft). The total distance used for the record was 1,905 m (6,250.0 ft).

Date	Record	Time
23 September 2019	0–400–0 km/h	31.49 sec
16 June 2023	0–400–0 km/h	28.81 sec

== Reception ==
Reviews of the Regera have been generally positive, with most descriptions of the driving experience being centered around the unique feel of the Direct-Drive system. Automobile magazine writes that driving the Regera is "a new sensation, perhaps a combination of the feel you get from electric cars like the Model S, which also has no conventional gearbox, and a combustion-engine vehicle with a continuously variable transmission". Top Gear writes that at low speeds, the noise and drive of the Regera feels like "a lazy American V8 muscle car", but that at higher speeds, the car is "instantly alert" and "corners flat and tenaciously". Minor criticisms of the driving experience include the electric motor activation delay and the "slight CVT feel" upon sudden acceleration. However, each car's transmission feel and power delivery can be tuned to the request of the customer.

The Regera's design has received acclaim from reviewers, with Top Gear remarking "there's real beauty in its long tail and taut curves". Global Car Brands praised the car for differing from the common trend of hyper-aggressive fronts, instead going for a "happy looking face". In particular, reviewers commend the car for its remarkable exterior paint jobs, which are described in separate reviews as being "sensational", "absolutely stunning", and "gloriously wonderful". On the inside, Automobile magazine compliments the "well-designed" and "wildly special" interior of the car, but remarks that it may be topped by the opulence of the Bugatti Chiron, a direct competitor to the Regera.

== Production ==
Koenigsegg originally planned to build 80 Regeras, making it the largest single-vehicle production run from the company at the time of its unveiling, though ultimately 85 Regera were built. All sold out on 13 June 2017 to customers and dealerships, just over two years after the initial unveiling of the car in Geneva.

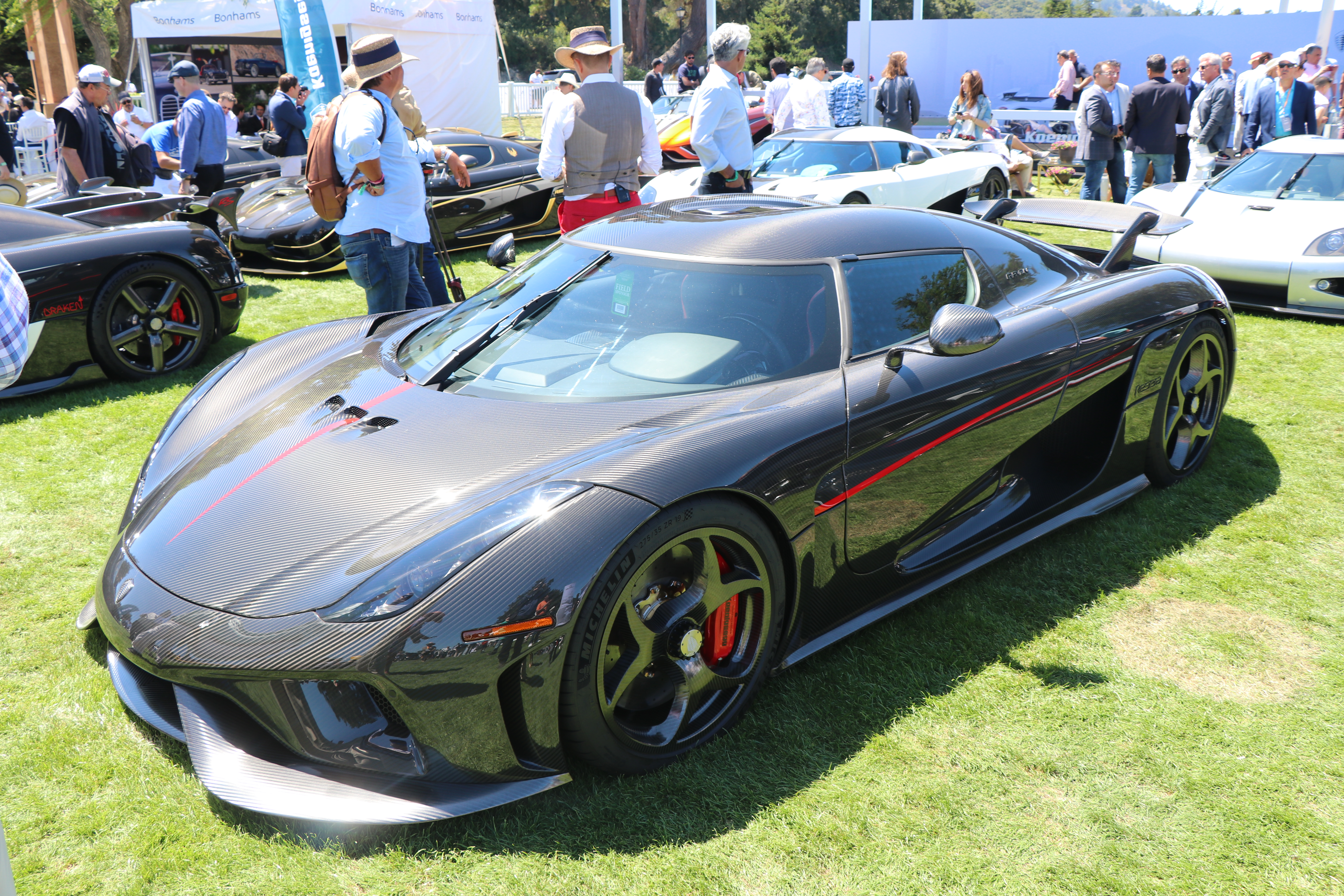
Regera Raven

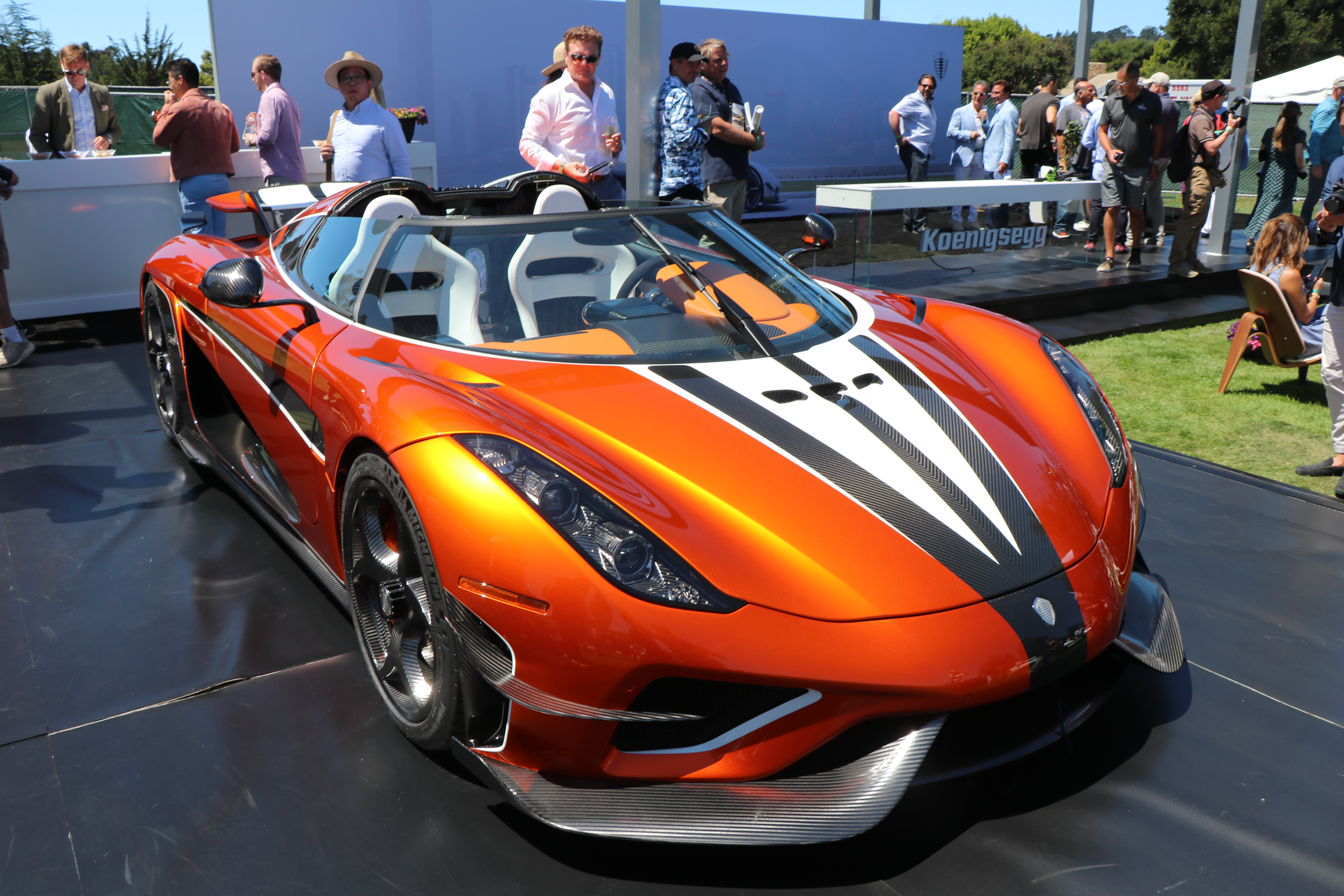
Regera Kejsare

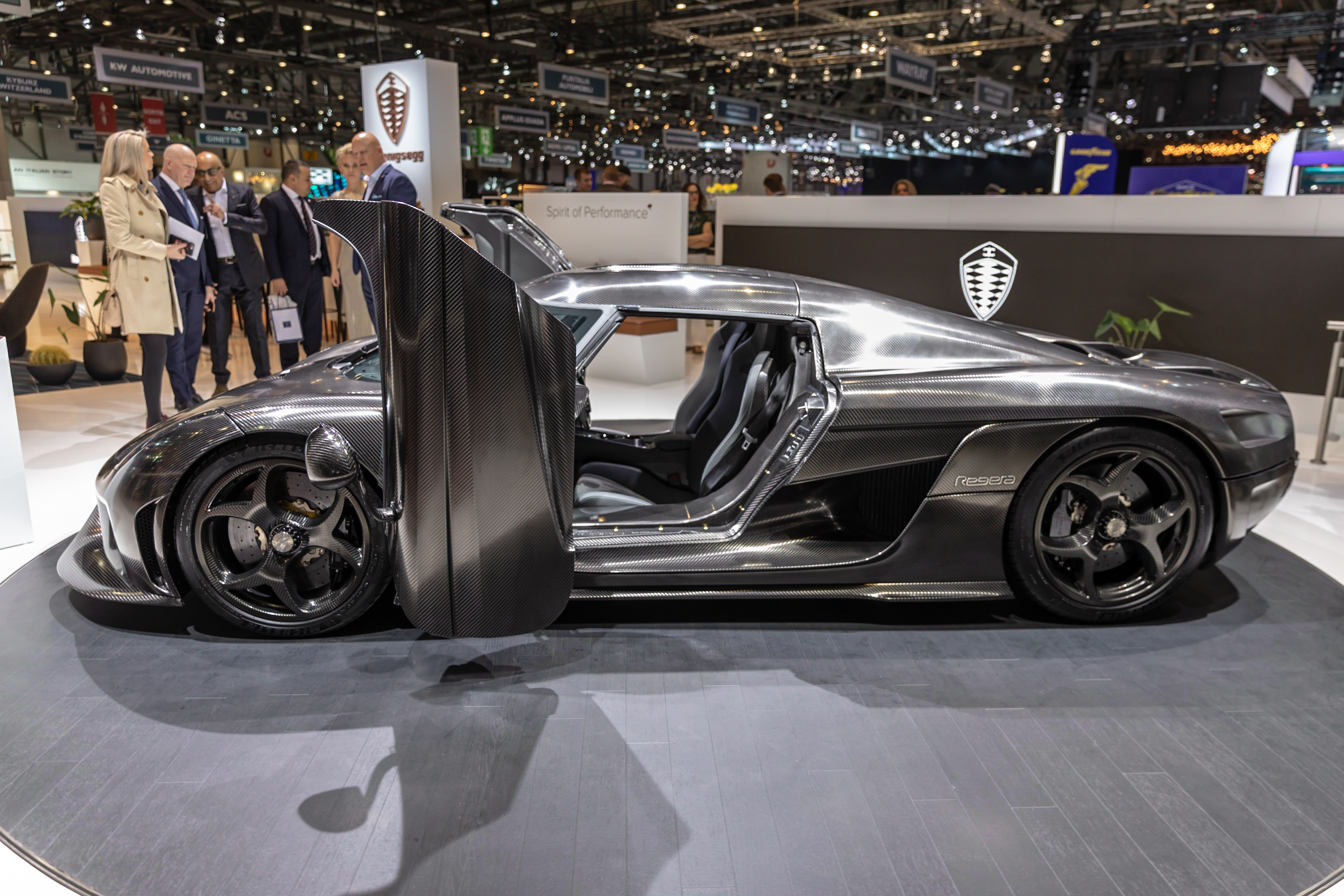
Regera KNC (Koenigsegg Naked Carbon)

=== Special editions ===
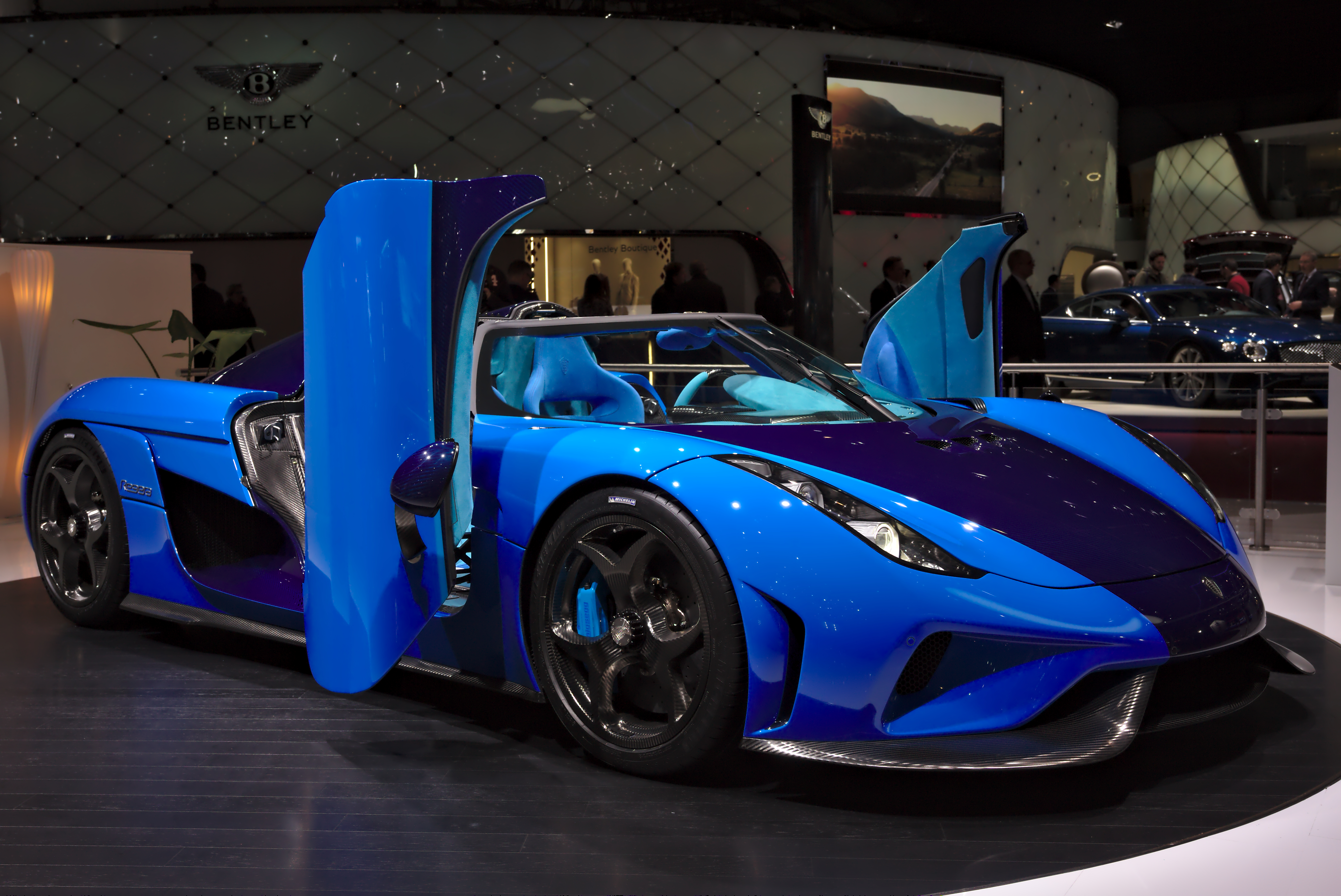
The Regera d'Elegance, sporting a custom Swedish blue paintwork

A number of special editions of the Regera have been built on customer request. These special editions usually involve custom paint jobs or carbon fibre work, special interior materials, and optional aerodynamics packages. Such special editions include:

- Regera "d'Elegance" (chassis no. 139)
- Regera KNC (Koenigsegg Naked Carbon, chassis no. 209)
- Regera "Raven" (chassis no. 145)
- Regera "Kejsare" (chassis no. 173)
- Regera "Malin" (chassis no. 129)
- Regera "by Echo" (chassis no. 159)
- Regera "168" (chassis no. 168)
- Regera "Casper" (chassis no. 184)
- Regera "Golden Knight" (chassis no. 186)
- Regera "Elegua" (chassis no. 226)
- Regera "Gotham" (chassis no. 227)
- Regera "Asger" (chassis no. 228)
- Regera "Lejonet" (chassis 231)
- Regera "Honey" (chassis no. 500, not part of the typical chassis sequence but purchased by the owner)

== Gallery ==
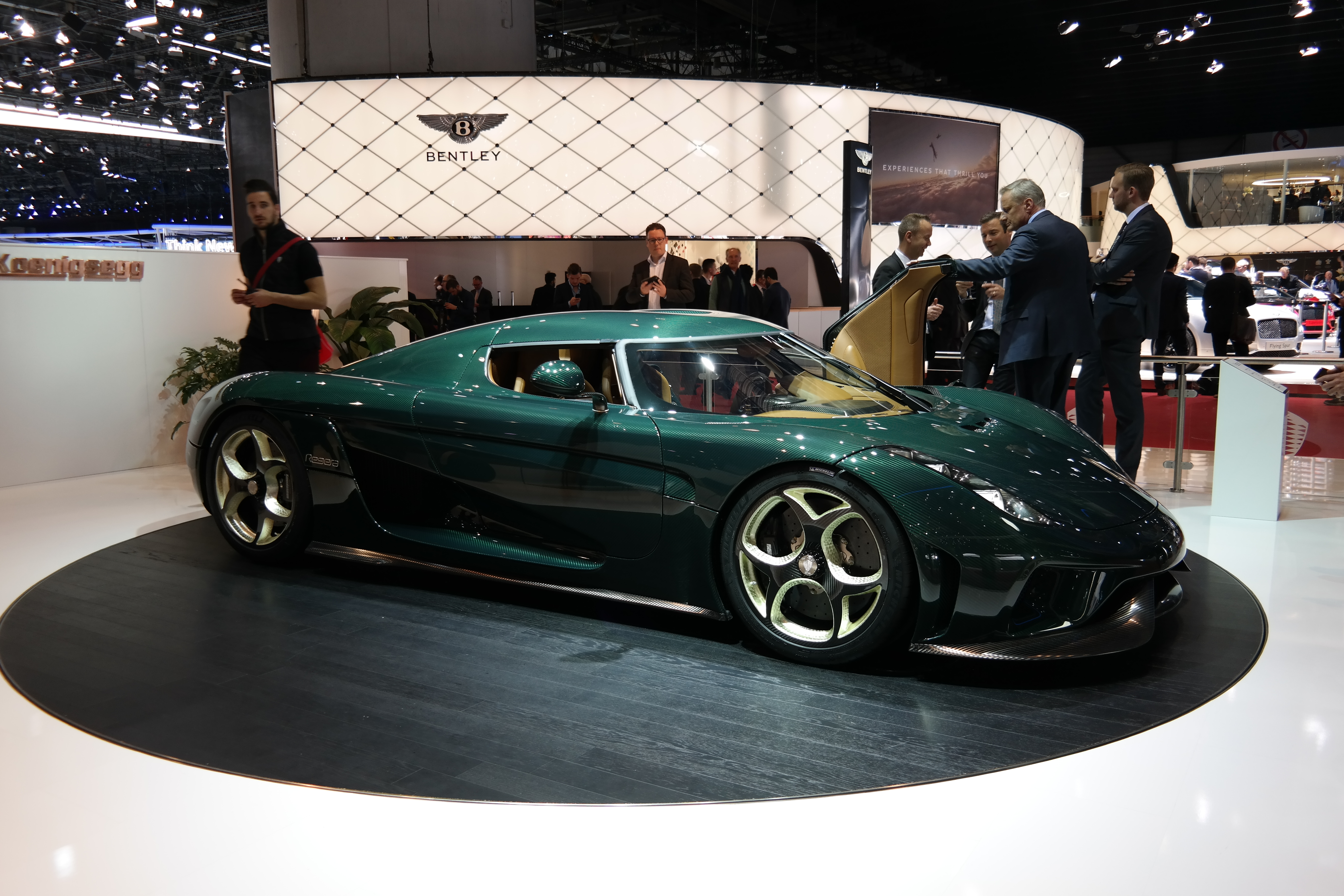
The Koenigsegg Regera at the 2017 Geneva Motor Show.

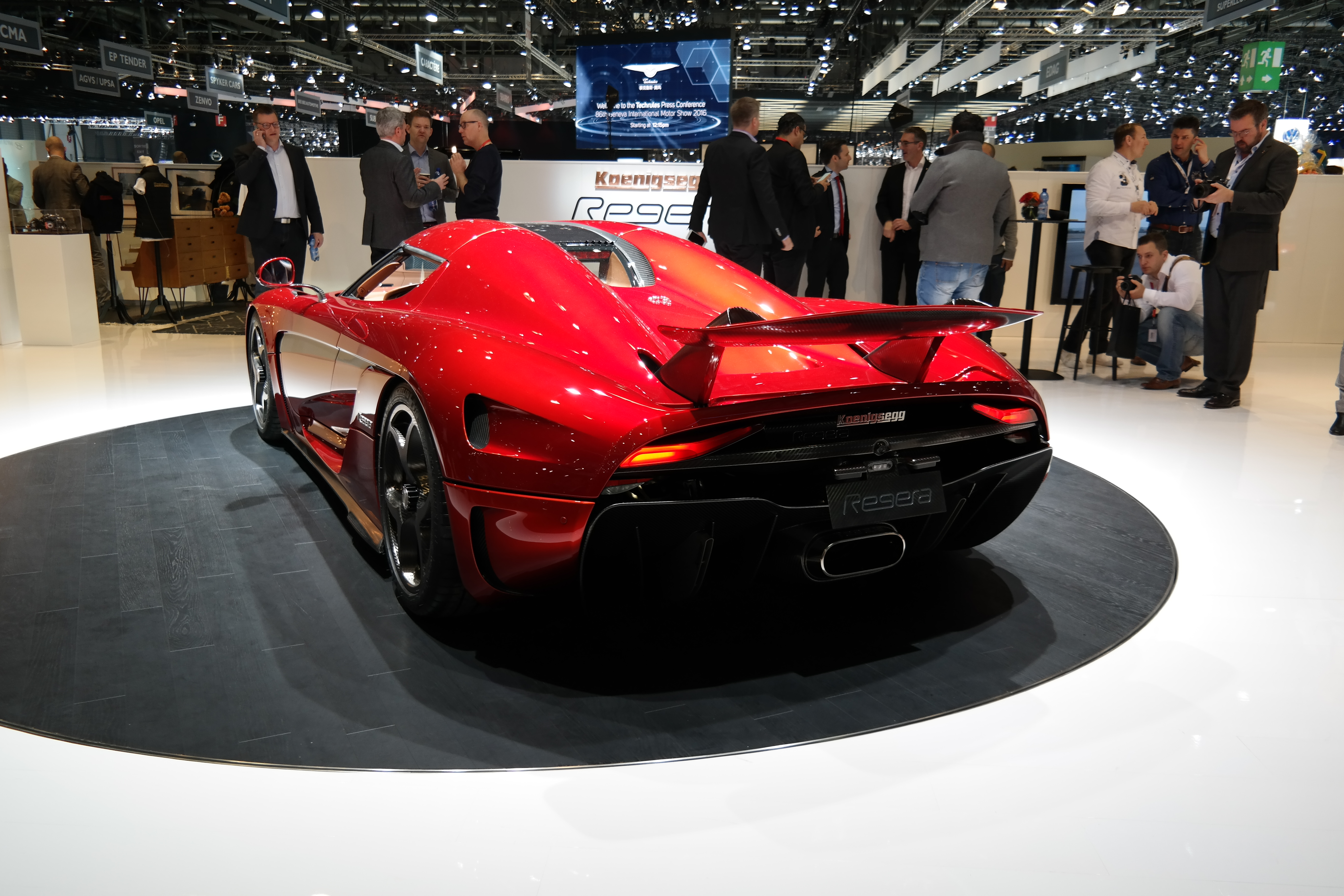
Rear three-quarter view.

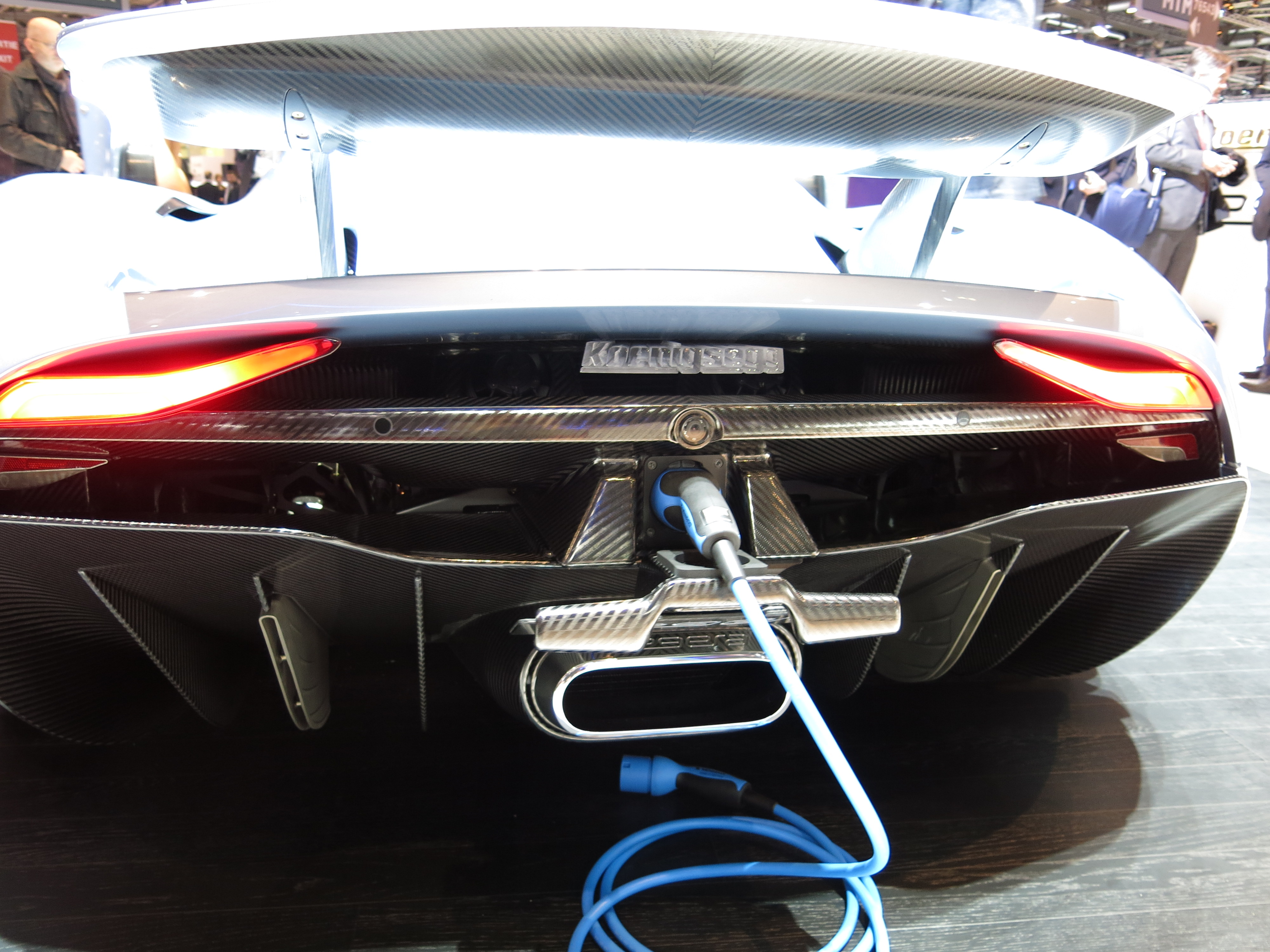
Close-up of the rear showing the charge port in use.

== See also ==
- List of production cars by power output
