= YASA Limited =

British electric motor manufacturer

YASA Limited.
- Type: Private company
- Industry: Manufacturing
- Founded: Oxford, United Kingdom (September 2009)
- Headquarters: Oxford, Oxfordshire
- Key people: Joerg Miska, CEO; Tim Woolmer, CTO and founder
- Products: Electric motors Generators; Motor controllers
- Parent: Mercedes-Benz
- Website: www.yasa.com

YASA is a British manufacturer of electric motors and motor controllers for use in automotive and industrial applications. The company was founded in 2009 by the CTO Tim Woolmer who is also the holder of a number of related motor technology patents. Although initial commercial adoption was in high-performance cars, markets for YASA e-motors and generators now include the off-road, marine, industrial and aerospace sectors.

== History ==
YASA Limited (formerly YASA Motors Limited) was founded in September 2009 to commercialise a permanent-magnet axial-flux electric motor (YASA stands for yokeless and segmented armature). The motor was developed for the Morgan LIFEcar in 2008 by Malcolm McCulloch and Tim Woolmer, then a PhD student, at the University of Oxford. In 2015, YASA Motors launched the P400 series of motors in serial production for volume manufacturers. In January 2018, YASA's 1st series production facility, capable of 100,000 units per year, was officially opened by Greg Clark, UK Secretary of State for Business, Energy and Industrial Strategy.

In May 2019, the company announced "Ferrari selects YASA electric motor for SF90 Stradale, the company's first hybrid production series supercar"

On 22 July 2021 YASA Limited was acquired by Mercedes-Benz. Just before the acquisition, YASA spun out Evolito Ltd with the rights to develop the technology for aviation applications.

On 21 May 2024, YASA received approval to establish its new headquarters at a former RAF base in Bicester, Oxfordshire.

In July 2025, YASA announced a prototype 550 kW (738 hp) 13.1 kg (29 lb) motor, equating to power density of 42 kW/kg, which the company claimed to be the highest ever achieved.

In October 2025, YASA announced an updated 12.7 kg prototype that on the dynamometer produced a peak power of 750 kW (1,005 hp) and sustained power of 350-400 kW. A version matching conventional personal vehicles could be even smaller and lighter.

== Products and applications ==
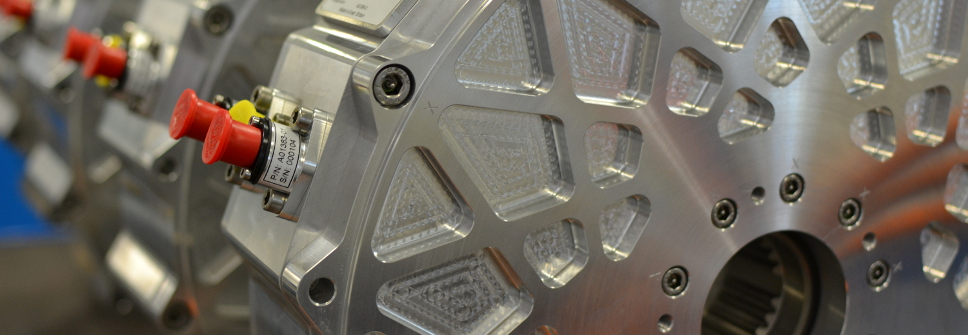
YASA 750 e-motor/generator. 790 Nm from 37 kg.

YASA offer a range of off-the-shelf and custom motors for use in a number of applications such as electric (BEV) and hybrid vehicle drivetrain, power generation and hydraulics replacement systems.

=== Standard motors and controllers ===
YASA's standard electric motors have been used in several high-performance cars such as the Drive eO PP03 (the first EV to win the Pikes Peak International Hill Climb outright), Jaguar C-X75, Koenigsegg Regera, and a Lola Le Mans Prototype converted by Drayson Racing, which set a world electric land speed record in 2013.

==== YASA P400R series ====
The YASA P400R series of electric motors produces up to 160 kW (210 hp) peak power at 700 V and 370 N⋅m (270 ft⋅lb) of peak torque at 450 amps. At this peak power, the off-the-shelf P400 series achieves a power density of 6.67 kW/kg (4.06 hp/lb), with continuous rating of up to 100 kW (130 hp). The stator of the P400 series motors is oil cooled, and can optionally include additional air cooling.

==== YASA 750R ====
The YASA 750R is the larger and more powerful electric motor in YASA's standard range, producing up to 200 kW (270 hp) of peak power at 700 V and 790 N⋅m (580 ft⋅lb) of peak torque. Continuous operating power for the 750 R is stated at up to 70 kW (94 hp).

=== Custom powertrain solutions: e-motors, controllers & integrated electric drive units (EDU) ===
As well as standard products, YASA designs and manufactures e-motors that are fully integrated into the drivetrain of their OEM and Tier 1 automotive customers. The e-motors feature power densities up to 20 kW/kg (12 hp/lb) in vehicle applications that include P2 hybrid vehicle powertrain, P4 traction motor for e-axle and REx (range-extension).
