= Koenigsegg CC8S =

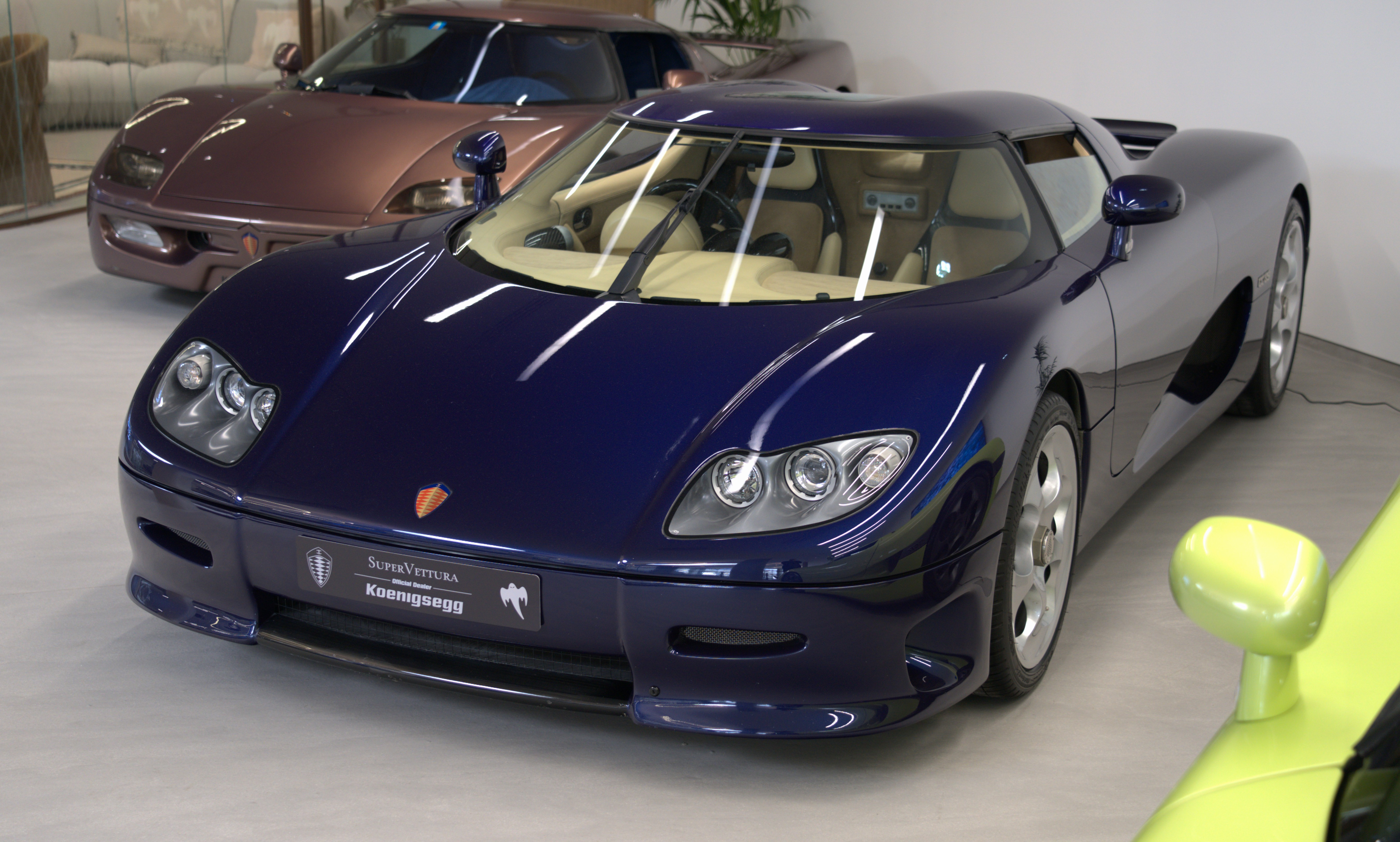

Overview
- Manufacturer: Koenigsegg Automotive AB
- Production: 2002–2003 (6 built) LHD: 4 made RHD: 2 made
- Assembly: Sweden: Ängelholm
- Designer: Christian von Koenigsegg; David Crafoord

Body and chassis
- Class: Sports car (S)
- Body style: 2-door Targa top
- Layout: Rear mid-engine, rear-wheel drive
- Platform: Koenigsegg CC
- Doors: Dihedral Synchro-Helix

Powertrain
- Engine: 4.7 L Koenigsegg twin-supercharged V8 (based on Ford Modular engine)
- Power output: 664 PS (488 kW; 655 hp)
- Transmission: 6-speed manual

Dimensions
- Wheelbase: 2,659 mm (104.7 in)
- Length: 4,191 mm (165.0 in)
- Width: 1,989 mm (78.3 in)
- Height: 1,069 mm (42.1 in)
- Curb weight: 1,175 kg (2,590 lb) (Dry)

Chronology
- Successor: Koenigsegg CCR; Koenigsegg CC850 (spiritual)

The Koenigsegg CC8S is a mid-engine sports car produced by the Swedish automobile manufacturer Koenigsegg. It was the company's first production automobile and the first production car to use the company's trademark dihedral synchro-helix actuation doors. At its introduction, it won several awards, including the Guinness World Record for the Most Powerful Production Engine and design awards from both Red Dot in Germany and Utmärkt Svensk Form in Sweden.

== Development ==
The CC8S was developed from the CC prototype. It was the culmination of 8 years of research and development. Despite limited resources, the chassis, suspension, brakes, and several other components were designed in-house by Koenigsegg. The pre-production car was shown at the 2000 Paris Auto Show, the public's reaction to the car was favourable and international contacts were made. The car had many unique functions such as the roof, which could be stored in the car's trunk located in the front similar to how a Chevrolet Corvette stores its roof (other Targa top sports cars of the time such as the Ferrari F50 lacked this feature), vertical opening doors dubbed dihedral synchro-helix actuation doors and a central patented free-flowing exhaust system based on the 'Rocket Cat Principle'. These unique features and design received great praise from the spectators, despite large orders, only 6 cars were produced due to high production costs out of which, 2 were right-hand drive. The CC8S was replaced by the more powerful CCR model in 2004.

== Overview ==
=== Body ===
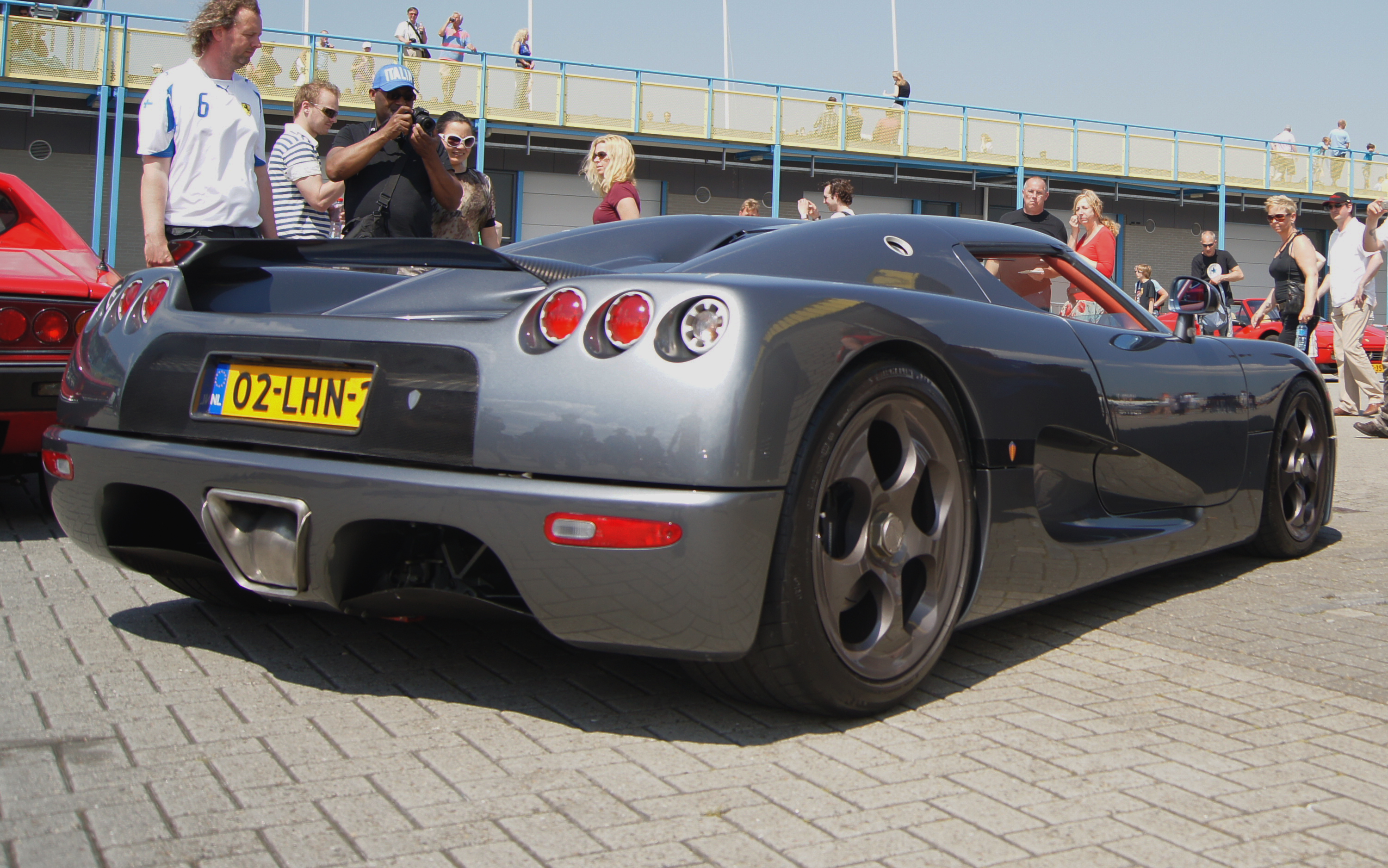
Rear view

The body is a two-door, two-seat targa top design, meaning a portion of the roof can be removed and stored under the bonnet. The chassis is made from kevlar-reinforced carbon fibre. The kevlar-reinforced carbon fibre semi-monocoque is attached to a steel subframe at the front of the chassis, and an aluminium subframe at the rear.

The engine, transmission, and rear suspension are mounted to the aluminium subframe. All body panels are made from carbon fibre, and venturi tunnels and diffusers occupy the bottom of the car. These components increase downforce in conjunction with a rear-mounted spoiler. The frontal area of the car is just CdA=1.825 square metres (19.64 sq ft), which, in conjunction with the car's low drag coefficient of Cd=0.30, affords the car very low overall aerodynamic drag.

=== Engine and Transmission ===
The CC8S is powered by a supercharged 4.7–litre DOHC V8 engine based on the Ford Modular design but made of cast aluminium with 4 valves per cylinder and carbon fibre covers weighing 210 kg (463 lb), with a compression ratio of 8.6:1. It produces 664 PS (488 kW; 655 hp) at 6,800 rpm and 750 N⋅m (553 lb⋅ft) of torque at 5,000 rpm. The redline is set to 7,250 rpm. The engine powers the rear wheels through a 6-speed manual transmission specially developed for the car by CIMA.

=== Wheels ===
The CC8S uses magnesium alloy wheels with center-locking hubs, to which 225/40ZR 18" front and 335/40ZR 20" rear Michelin Pilot Sport 2 tyres are mounted. The brake discs are cross-drilled for increased ventilation, and measure 340 mm (13.4 in) at the front and 315 mm (12.4 in) at the rear. The brake calipers contain 6 pistons in front and 4 pistons at the rear. The brakes are power-assisted by the Koenigsegg Advanced Control System.

=== Performance ===
Manufacturer estimates

- Acceleration: 0–100 km/h (0–62 mph) under 3.5 seconds
- Top speed: 390 km/h (240 mph)
- Standing 1/4 mile (402 m): 10 seconds, trap speed 217 km/h (135 mph)
- Braking distance: 32 m (105 ft) 100–0 km/h (62–0 mph)

== Chassis numbers ==
Vehicle Identification Number	Paint	Note
001	Red	Owned by Koenigsegg and later heavily modified.
002	Blue, later repainted Silver	First customer car produced by Koenigsegg.
003	Black	Later converted to CCR as chassis number 026.
004	Nordic Ice Green, later repainted Black	
005	Blue Scuro	Right-hand drive
006	Silver, later repainted Grey	

== See also ==
- Timeline of most powerful production cars
- Koenigsegg CC850
