= Koenigsegg CCR =

Swedish sports car

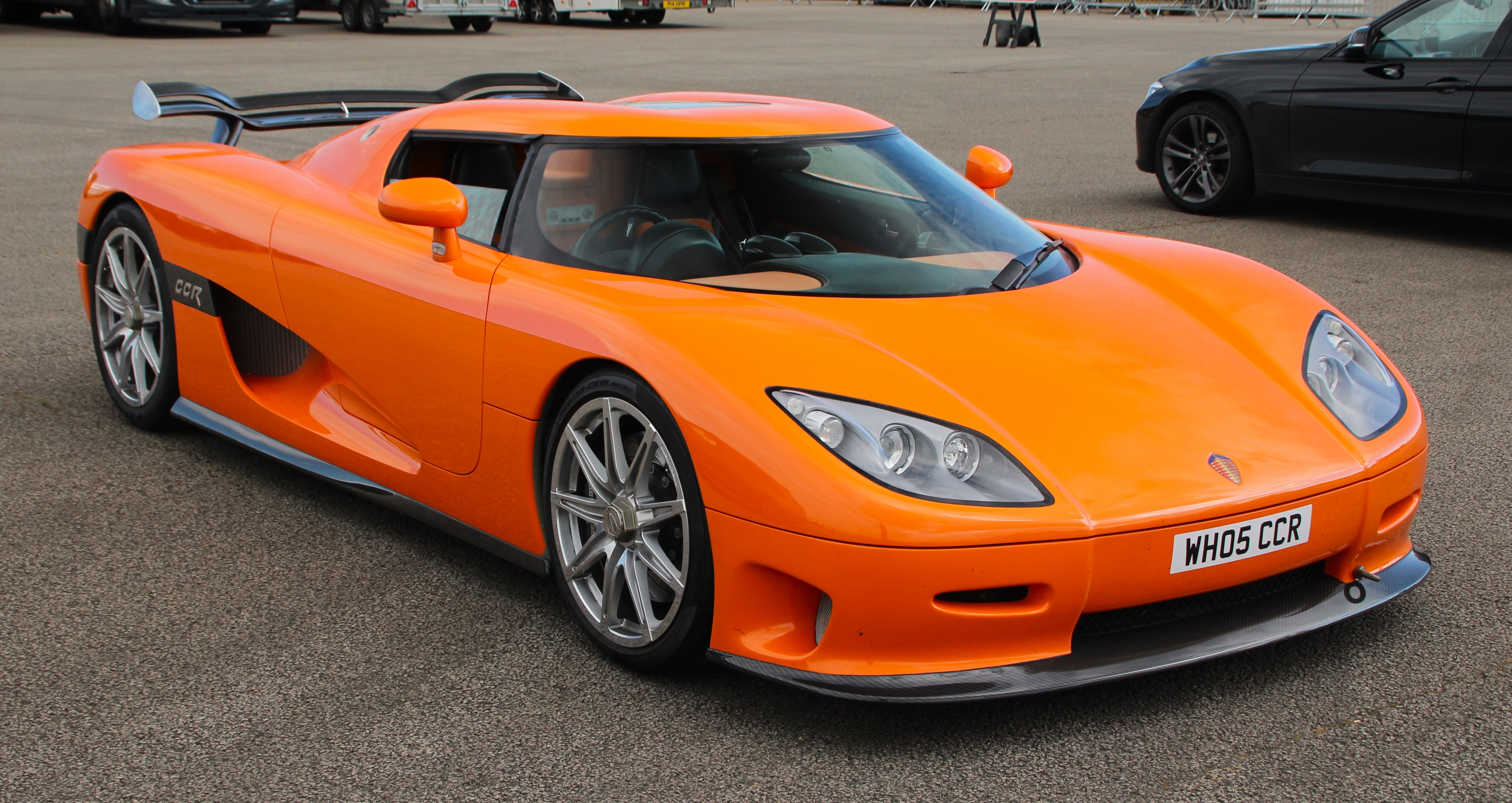

Overview
- Manufacturer: Koenigsegg Automotive AB
- Production: 2004–2006; 14 produced
- Assembly: Sweden: Ängelholm
- Designer: Sven-Harry Åkesson; Christian von Koenigsegg; David Crafoord

Body and chassis
- Class: Sports car (S)
- Body style: 2-door targa top
- Layout: Rear mid-engine, rear-wheel drive
- Platform: Koenigsegg CC
- Doors: Dihedral synchro-helix

Powertrain
- Engine: 4.7 L Koenigsegg supercharged V8 (based on Ford Modular engine) (CCR)
- Power output: 806 hp (817 PS; 601 kW) at 6900 rpm; 920 N⋅m (679 lbf⋅ft) of torque at 5700 rpm
- Transmission: 6-speed manual

Dimensions
- Wheelbase: 2,659 mm (104.7 in)
- Length: 4,191 mm (165.0 in)
- Width: 1,989 mm (78.3 in)
- Height: 1,069 mm (42.1 in)
- Curb weight: 1,230 kg (2,712 lb); 1,180 kg (2,601 lb) dry weight

Chronology
- Predecessor: Koenigsegg CC8S
- Successor: Koenigsegg CCX

The Koenigsegg CCR is a mid-engine sports car manufactured by Koenigsegg and the successor to the company's previous offering, the CC8S.

== Overview ==
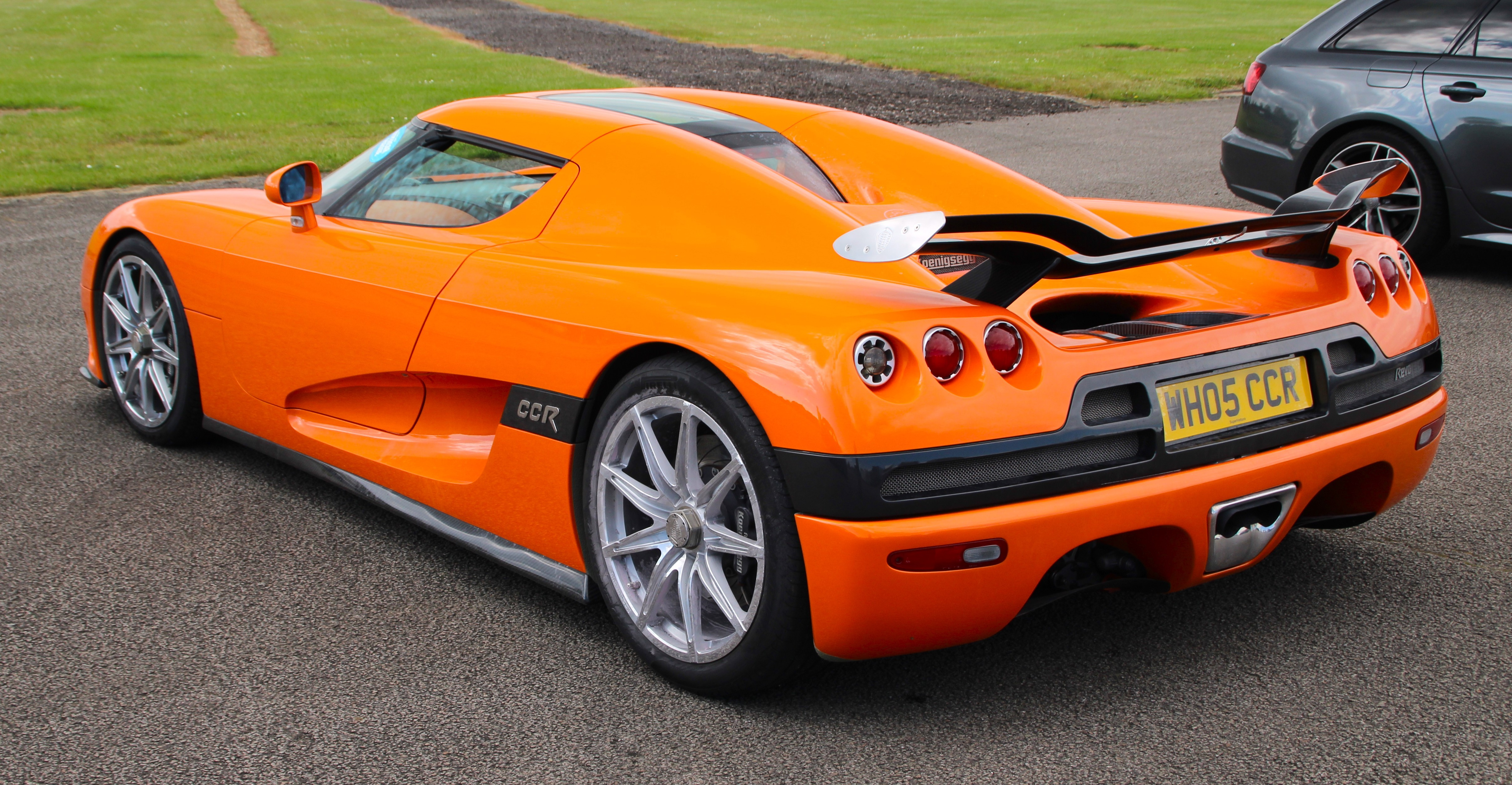
CCR rear view

Debuting at the March 2004 Geneva Auto Show, the CCR was the most powerful version of the Koenigsegg CC range cars at the time. Like the CC8S it features dihedral synchro-helix actuation doors. It has, however, various improvements. A larger front splitter for optimized downforce and tweaked headlight arrangement came standard with a rear wing. New larger tires and wheels equipped with larger brakes. Upgraded suspension and a more powerful engine with twin Rotrex Superchargers, producing 601 kW (806 hp; 817 PS) at 6900 rpm and 920 N⋅m (679 lbf⋅ft) of torque at 5700 rpm.

To honour the Swedish Fighter Jet Squadron No 1 (Johan röd) which had occupied the current facility of Koenigsegg, the CCR is adorned with a symbol of a ghost, the symbol of the squadron.

=== Performance ===
- Displacement: 4,700 cc (4.7 L; 286.8 cu in)
- Bore × Stroke: 90.6 mm × 92 mm (3.57 in × 3.62 in) 593.11 cc (0.6 L; 36.2 cu in) per cylinder
- Acceleration: 0-100 km/h (62 mph) in 3.2 seconds
- Top speed: 388 km/h (241 mph); theoretical top speed of over 395 km/h (245 mph)
  - 0-60 km/h (37 mph): 2.1 seconds
  - 0-80 km/h (50 mph): 3.0 seconds
  - 0-100 km/h (62 mph): 3.7 seconds
  - 0-120 km/h (75 mph): 4.3 seconds
  - 0-140 km/h (87 mph): 5.5 seconds
  - 0-160 km/h (99 mph): 6.5 seconds
  - 0-180 km/h (112 mph): 7.9 seconds
  - 0-200 km/h (124 mph): 9.3 seconds
  - 0-220 km/h (137 mph): 11.0 seconds
  - 0-240 km/h (149 mph): 13.7 seconds
  - 0-260 km/h (162 mph): 16.2 seconds
  - 0-300 km/h (186 mph): 24.9 seconds
  - 0-1/4 mile: 11.2 seconds @ 224 km/h (139 mph)

=== Special/Tuned Editions ===
==== CCR REVO ====
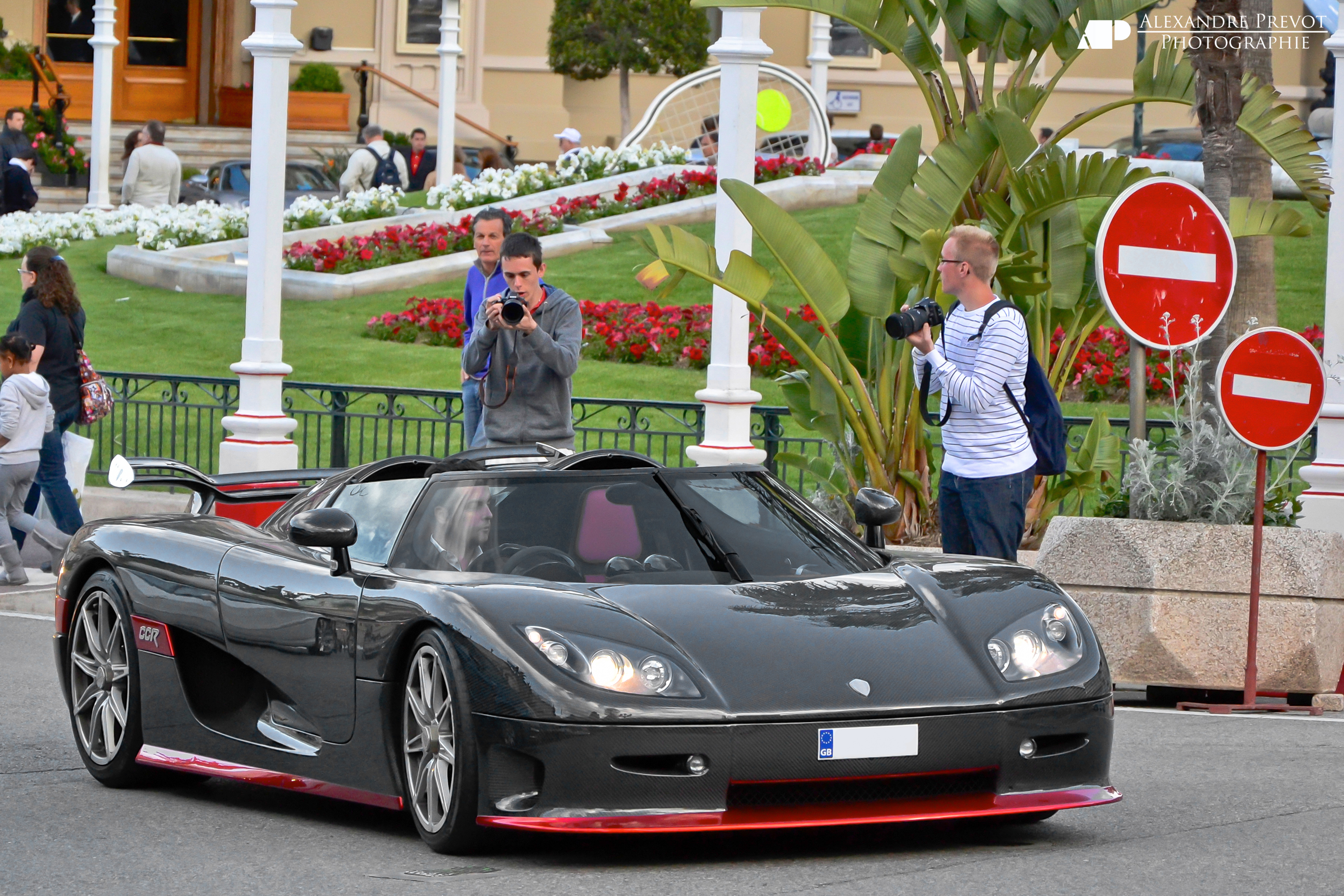
Koenigsegg CCR Revo

Originally a sky blue CCR with a white and blue bi-colour interior, this CCR received major upgrades from the factory upon the owner's request in 2012 and was dubbed the Koenigsegg CCR Revo. It included numerous changes over the original car such as a clear coated carbon fibre body with candy red accents, red and black bi-colour interior with Koenigsegg Revo embroidered on the passenger side of the dashboard along with a fire extinguisher and an updated steering wheel, CCX rear diffuser, side skirts, fog lights, front splitter and wheels along with the twin-deck F1 rear spoiler found on the CCXR. The car also received engine upgrades such as an updated engine management system and superchargers.

==== EDO Competition CCR Evolution ====
A German-based tuning company named EDO Competition highly modified a CCR in 2011. They said CCR was originally yellow but had already received upgrades from the factory such as Silver exterior paint and 11-spoke CCX wheels, front splitter and side skirts, as well as the Top Gear rear spoiler in 2008. The company's process with the CCR began with a modified ECU to boost power and a modified drive ratio to allow the vehicle to achieve its peak torque. The six speed gearbox was disassembled in its entirety and the plastic bushings were replaced with Uniball units resulting in the improved drive ratio. Due to the remapped ECU, power was up from 815 to 903 PS (600 to 664 kW) and the reduction of the redline to 7,200 rpm. As a result, the EDO Competition CCR Evolution can get from 0 to 100 km/h (62 mph) in 3.2 seconds, 0 to 200 km/h (124 mph) in 9.7 seconds, and 0 to 300 km/h (186 mph) in 23 seconds. As for the exterior, the tuner offered a new set of wheels with a coat of charcoal paint and an updated front end with auxiliary lights. The interior of the Koenigsegg was then covered in Alcantara material and a redesigned center console was added to accommodate a new infotainment system with a reversing camera and a custom-made pouch for the immobilizer remote. The total cost for this customization kit was €40,000 or $56,428.

== Speed record ==
At its debut, Koenigsegg claimed the CCR to be the fastest production car with a theoretical top speed of more than 395 km/h (245 mph). Said claim was put to test on February 28, 2005, at Italy's Nardò Ring where a team of five Koenigsegg engineers and mechanics together with founder Christian von Koenigsegg ran a standard CCR, driven by Loris Bicocchi to a top speed of 387.87 km/h (241.01 mph), breaking the fastest production car record (if "production car" is defined accordingly). However, in April 2005, not long after the CCR claimed the record, a prototype of the long-awaited Bugatti Veyron took the crown with a top speed over 400 km/h (250 mph) with the production model reaching 408.47 km/h (253.81 mph).

== Chassis numbers ==
Vehicle Identification Number	Paint	Note	Nickname
008	Lava Orange		
009	Mother of pearl, later repainted carbon with red details	Heavily modified	Revo
011	Lava Orange		
014	Pale Yellow, later repainted dark blue		
015	Lava Orange		
016	Grey		
017	Yellow, later repainted silver	Crashed, repaired and modified after	
018	Koenigsegg Racing Green	Split rear wing	
019	Lava Orange		
020	Lava Orange		
021	Lava Orange		
022	Red, later repainted black		
023	Lava Orange		
025	Lava Orange		
026	Black	Converted from CC8S number 003	

== See also ==
- List of production cars by power output
