= Apex: The Story of the Hypercar =

APEX: The Story of the Hypercar
- Film poster
- Directed by: J.F. Musial; Josh Vietze
- Written by: Mike Spinelli
- Produced by: Katherina Gaccione
- Starring: Alex Roy; Chris Goodwin; Chris Harris; Christian von Koenigsegg; Dan Greenawalt; Dan Neil; Detlev von Platen; Frank Stephenson; Frank-Steffen Walliser; Halldora von Koenigsegg; Horacio Pagani; Julius Kruta; Lennart Ohlsson; Manuel Berglund; Patrick Long; Paul Mackenzie; Rovert Serwanski; Stefan Brungs; Travis Okulski
- Narrated by: Zachary Levi
- Cinematography: Josh Vietze; Tom Morningstar; William Barber
- Edited by: Josh Vietze; Tom Morningstar; William Barber
- Music by: Ryan Taubert; Salomon Ligthelm; Tony Anderson
- Production company: TangentVector
- Distributed by: TangentVector
- Release date: March 2016
- Running time: 85 minutes
- Languages: English, French, German, Italian, Spanish

APEX: The Story of the Hypercar is a 2016 American documentary film directed by J.F. Musial and Josh Vietze, produced by Katherina Gaccione. It covers the definition of the automobile term 'hypercar', as well as Koenigsegg CEO and president Christian von Koenigsegg's mission to defeat the world record in the Nürburgring and Spa-Francorchamps in the Koenigsegg One:1.

The documentary was released worldwide on November 18, 2016.

== Synopsis ==
The entire synopsis of the documentary is about the hypercar and the quest to change the automotive industry with a new sports car from the company Koenigsegg, which is led by the CEO and President of the same name. Along the synopsis, the audience will also learn from a few of the largest automakers in the industry.

== Film content ==
What is a hypercar? There may be no better way to ignite an argument than to try and define what a hypercar is.

— Zachary Levi

The film begins with automotive journalist Chris Harris, Jalopnik founder and editor Mike Spinelli, editor Dan Neil, Road & Track editor Travis Okulski, Xbox creative director Dan Greenawalt, writer and rally driver Alex Roy, Pagani founder and executive Horacio Pagani, and Koenigsegg founder and CEO Christian von Koenigsegg. Each of them provide a description of their first experiences around a hypercar and their connections around them, as well as providing a definition as to what they think a hypercar is. Narrator Zachary Levi also explains the physical iteration of a hypercar using the LaFerrari, Porsche 918 Spyder, and the McLaren P1 as examples.

Christian von Koenigsegg's backstory is also followed, as well as the story of how he went on to pursue his quest of creating the best sports car. von Koenigsegg recalls his history as a car enthusiast and how he was inspired to create a sports car under his vision. His wife Halldora also recounts her history as an employee of the Swedish company, and how they first built their first running prototype, the CC. von Koenigsegg's vehicle is revealed as the One:1, an Agera-based sports car that contains a 1:1 power-to-weight ratio that concentrates on circuit driving which uses prepreg carbon fiber material and includes a race car-focused personality.

The film later focuses on the 918, P1, and the Bugatti Veyron, where the starring cast compliment the cars as well as their construction behind the scenes, referring to each car's high-level build quality.

The One:1 makes its appearance for the Geneva Motor Show in time, and is also where Christian von Koenigsegg takes a walk around the event, taking a look at the new automobiles, interacting with other people, and inspecting some artwork.

The documentary also discusses the LaFerrari, the Pagani Huayra, Horacio Pagani's story as an automotive executive, Koenigsegg's testing fault at the Nürburgring, as well as the death of a spectator at the Nürburgring. Christian von Koenigsegg reconsidered his Nürburgring run after the spectator incident, and eventually backed out, forcing him and Koenigsegg to lap somewhere else, which meant going to Circuit de Spa-Francorchamps. However, this wouldn't work either due to having exceeded the circuit's decibel limit, therefore disqualifying the One:1 from any further attempts. Through research, however, calculations showed that Koenigsegg had the chance the break the record, though the margin was not near their expectations.

The documentary also features a segment about Forza Motorsport and how video games are changing the next generation of car enthusiasts.

The documentary ends with a final description of a hypercar, and how companies today are pushing the limits of hypercar technology.

== Featured people ==
The film's cast includes 17 people.

- Alex Roy
- Chris Harris
- Christian von Koenigsegg
- Dan Greenawalt
- Dan Neil
- Halldora von Koenigsegg
- Horacio Pagani
- Rovert Serwanski
- Travis Okulski
- Chris Goodwin
- Detlev von Platen
- Frank-Steffen Walliser
- Frank Stephenson
- Julius Kruta
- Lennart Ohlsson
- Manuel Berglund
- Patrick Long
- Paul Mackenzie
- Stefan Brungs
