= Koenigsegg CC850 =

2024 sports car manufactured by Koenigsegg

Overview
- Manufacturer: Koenigsegg Automotive AB
- Production: 2024−present 70 units sold
- Assembly: Sweden: Ängelholm
- Designer: Christian von Koenigsegg; Sasha Selipanov

Body and chassis
- Class: Sports car (S)
- Body style: 2-door targa top
- Layout: Rear mid-engine, rear-wheel drive
- Doors: Dihedral Synchro-Helix
- Related: Koenigsegg Jesko, Koenigsegg Chimera, Koenigsegg Gemera (V8 Version only)

Powertrain
- Engine: 5,065 cc (309.1 cu in) twin-turbo aluminium DOHC V8
- Transmission: 9-speed Koenigsegg LST multi-clutch with Engage Shifter System

Dimensions
- Wheelbase: 2,700 mm (106.3 in)
- Length: 4,364 mm (171.8 in)
- Width: 2,024 mm (79.7 in)
- Height: 1,127 mm (44.4 in)
- Kerb weight: 1,385 kg (3,053 lb)

Chronology
- Predecessor: Koenigsegg CC8S (spiritual)

The Koenigsegg CC850 is a limited production mid-engine sports car manufactured by Swedish automobile manufacturer Koenigsegg. It was unveiled on 19 August 2022 at Pebble Beach, California, as a homage to the CC8S. Built to commemorate the 20th anniversary of the first production CC8S, the CC850 was originally limited to 50 units to celebrate the company founder Christian von Koenigsegg's 50th birthday, however, due to increased demand it was announced six days later on 25 August 2022 that an additional 20 units would be built.

== Specifications ==
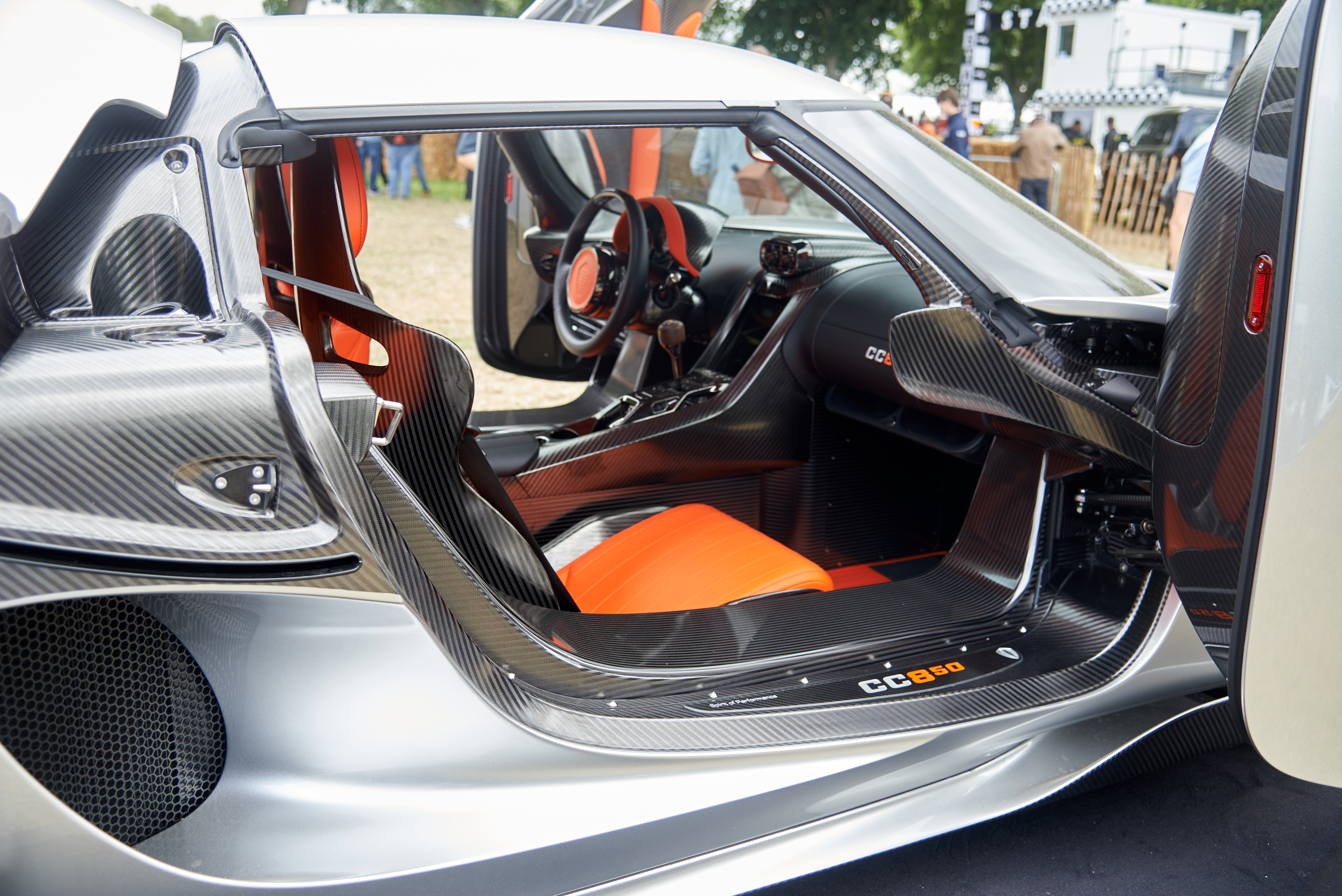
View with the doors open, showing the interior

Despite the similar name, the CC850 does not share any components with the original CC8S and is instead based on the Koenigsegg Jesko. Similar to the Jesko, the CC850 shares the same multilink front and rear suspension, which consists of double wishbones, hydraulic and gas-hydraulic shock absorbers, with Triplex dampers at the rear. Steering is rack and pinion, with Koenigsegg's proprietary 9-speed Light Speed Transmission sending power to the rear wheels. The CC850 also has a feature called the Engage Shifter System, which allows the driver to simulate six gears of manual shifting with a physical clutch pedal as opposed to paddle shifters.

The engine is also borrowed from the Jesko, displacing 5,065 cc (309.1 cu in) from a bore and stroke of 92.0 mm × 95.25 mm (3.62 in × 3.75 in). It is fitted with smaller turbochargers, resulting in a power output of 1,185 PS (872 kW; 1,169 hp) at 7,800 rpm on regular fuel, or 1,385 PS (1,019 kW; 1,366 hp) on E85. Peak torque is 1,385 N⋅m (1,022 lb⋅ft) at 4,800 rpm. The forged aluminium wheels (20" x 9.5" front, 21" 12.25" rear) are fitted with Michelin Pilot Sport 4S (265/35R-20 front, and 325/30R-21 rear). Stopping power is provided by a set of 410 mm (16.1 in) 6-piston calipers on the front wheels and 395 mm (15.6 in) 4-piston calipers on the rear.

== CCGT1 ==
The Koenigsegg CCGT1 is a special edition of the CC850 revealed at the 2026 Monterey Car Week.

The car was a tribute to the original 2007 GT1 project that was planned. However, with the abrupt discontinuation of the FIA GT1 World Championship, the GT1 never had to chance to race.

The 2026 CCGT1 is based on the CC850 but has also taken heavy inspiration from the original GT1 car such as a Sequel Shifter instead of the standard, a removable hard top roof instead of the CC850's doors, and a large rear wing that, unlike the original GT1, now has active aero.

The car also has an Optional Factory Track Package which is a first for Koenigsegg.
