= Koenigsegg Chimera =

Mid-engine sports car

Koenigsegg Chimera

The Koenigsegg Chimera is a one-off mid-engine sports car manufactured by Swedish automobile manufacturer Koenigsegg. It was unveiled on 7 July 2024 at The Aurora in Båstad, Sweden for FIA President Mohammed Ben Sulayem.

== Overview ==
The Koenigsegg Chimera is based on the Koenigsegg Agera RS chassis. It has the Koenigsegg Jesko engine and the Koenigsegg CC850 transmission. Only one was produced. The Chimera was used as a testing platform to develop the CC850 three years prior to the unveiling at The Aurora Concours.

The engine is the Jesko's 5.0-litre twin-turbo flat-plane crank V8 which does without a flywheel. Using 95-octane standard pump fuel it output 1,280 bhp, and 1,600 bhp on E85 fuel.

Koenigsegg Chimera rear
