= Dihedral synchro-helix actuation doors =

Type of door with hinge mechanism

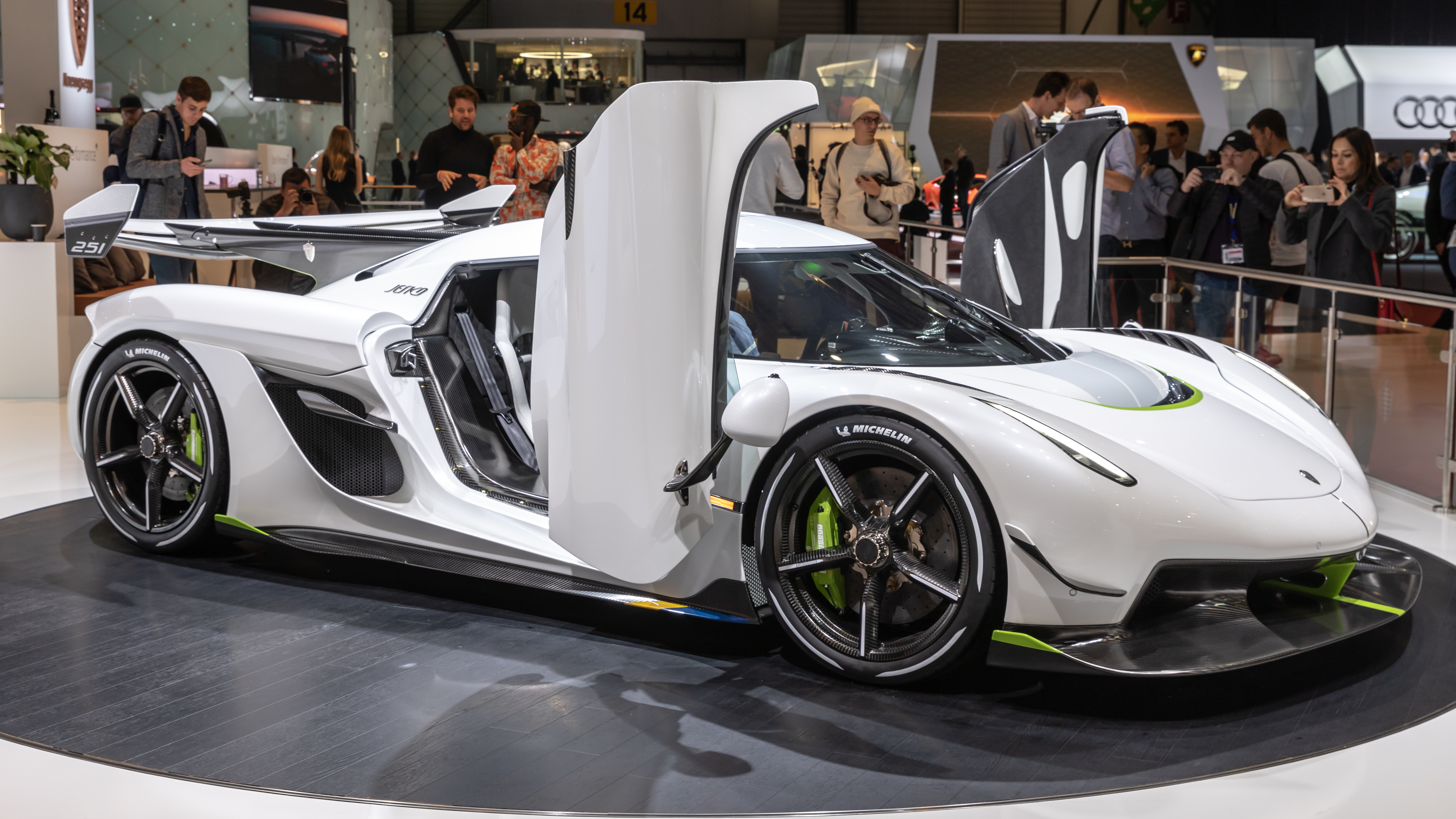
Pre-production model of Koenigsegg Jesko at the 2019 Geneva International Motor Show with its Dihedral Synchro-Helix Actuation Doors open

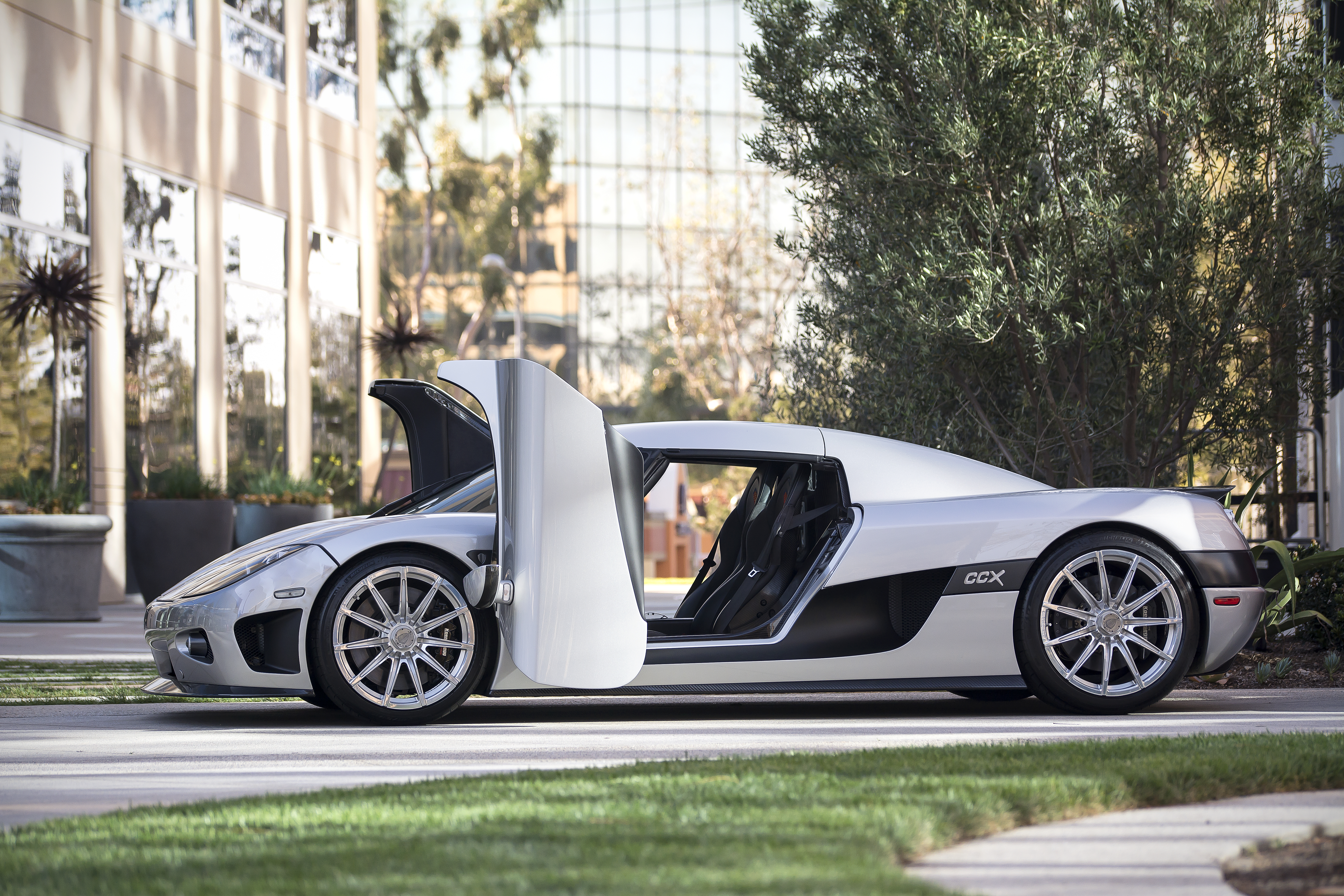
Koenigsegg CCX with dihedral doors open

The dihedral synchro-helix actuation door system is a type of door with a hinge mechanism which allows the doors to rotate 90° by sweeping outwards and upwards at the hinge. It was designed and developed by Christian von Koenigsegg on behalf of high-performance sports cars manufacturer Koenigsegg Automotive AB. It was conceived as revolutionary when it made its debut on the CC prototype (1994–2000). The first production car to be fitted with these doors was the Koenigsegg CC8S (2002–2003). The door's primary intention was to open high enough to avoid most curbs, but low enough to avoid garage ceilings. It also minimizes the space taken at the side of the car while opening the door, which makes it easier to open the doors while being parked in tight spaces with other parked cars at the sides. The Koenigsegg Regera was the first car to be equipped with Autoskin, a feature which allowed this mechanism to be completely motorized by making the door sweep automatically by pressing a button. These doors are found on all Koenigsegg cars and 2 concept cars by separate brands, including:

- Koenigsegg Agera
- Koenigsegg Agera Final
- Koenigsegg Agera R
- Koenigsegg Agera RS
- Koenigsegg CC
- Koenigsegg CC8S
- Koenigsegg CC850
- Koenigsegg CCR
- Koenigsegg CCX
- Koenigsegg CCXR
- Koenigsegg CCXR Trevita
- Koenigsegg Jesko
- Koenigsegg One:1
- Koenigsegg Regera
- Koenigsegg Gemera
- Mercedes-Benz F200
- Peugeot HR1

This door system isn't without its flaws. When the door is opened while the battery is connected, the power window opens down a quarter of the way. This is because if the battery fails or is disconnected, and the door is opened, the window will not open. If the door and bonnet are open at the same time, this can cause a collision between the bonnet and the door window, which can damage the bonnet. As a preventive measure, all cars with these doors come with a warning label visible when the door is open:

ATTENTION: Always avoid operating the bonnet and the doors at the same time when the battery is out/off. This is in order to avoid potential risk of collision resulting in scratches on the hood.

The warning also has dimensions of interval between the car and other obstacle placed near it which is recommended to be followed. The dimensions mentioned are a distance of 40 cm of gap towards the sides of the car and 10 cm of gap between the door at its open position to avoid any curbs present.
