= Mercedes-Benz F200 =

Mercedes-Benz F200 Imagination
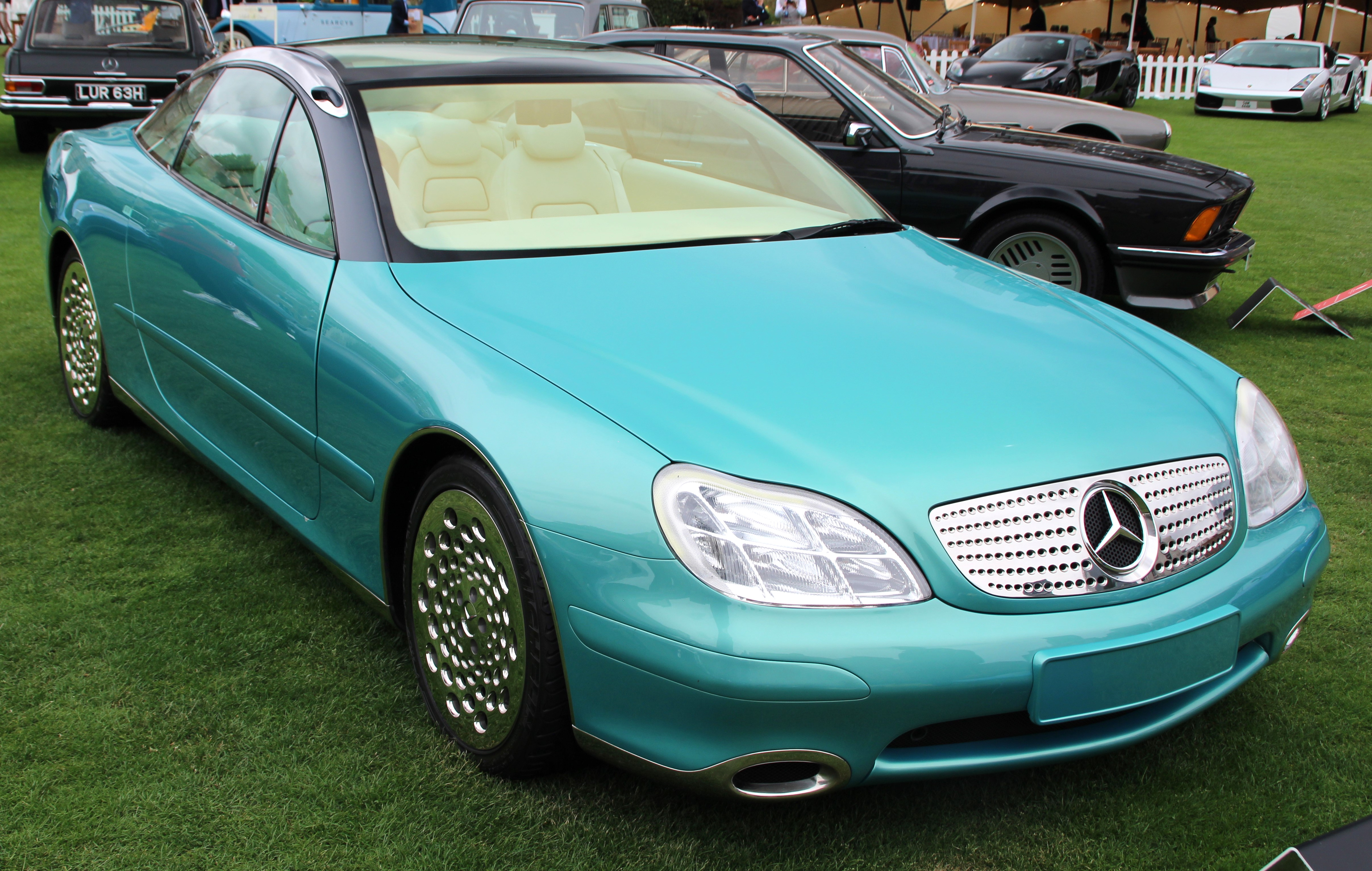

Overview
- Manufacturer: Daimler-Benz; Stola

Body and chassis
- Class: Concept car
- Body style: 2-door coupé
- Layout: Front engine, rear-wheel-drive
- Doors: Dihedral
- Related: Mercedes-Benz CL-Class (C215); Mercedes-Benz S-Class (W220)

Powertrain
- Engine: 6.0 L M120 V12
- Transmission: 5-speed electronically controlled automatic transmission

The Mercedes-Benz F200 "Imagination" coupe is a concept study by then Daimler-Benz unveiled at the 1996 Paris Motor Show. The goal was to show off innovations in control, design, and comfort in passenger cars. The car's exterior design was in part based on the, then, upcoming S-Class. This 2-door coupe also previewed the CL-Class coupe, which debuted in 1999.

== Design ==
The exterior design for the F200 came from Mercedes' Advanced Design team, and is primarily attributed to Christopher Rhoades and Harald Leschke. Construction of the car was carried out by Italian coachbuilder Stola, and the car was reportedly fully functional. The interior design took inspiration from the PlayStation game console and the cabin of an Airbus aircraft.

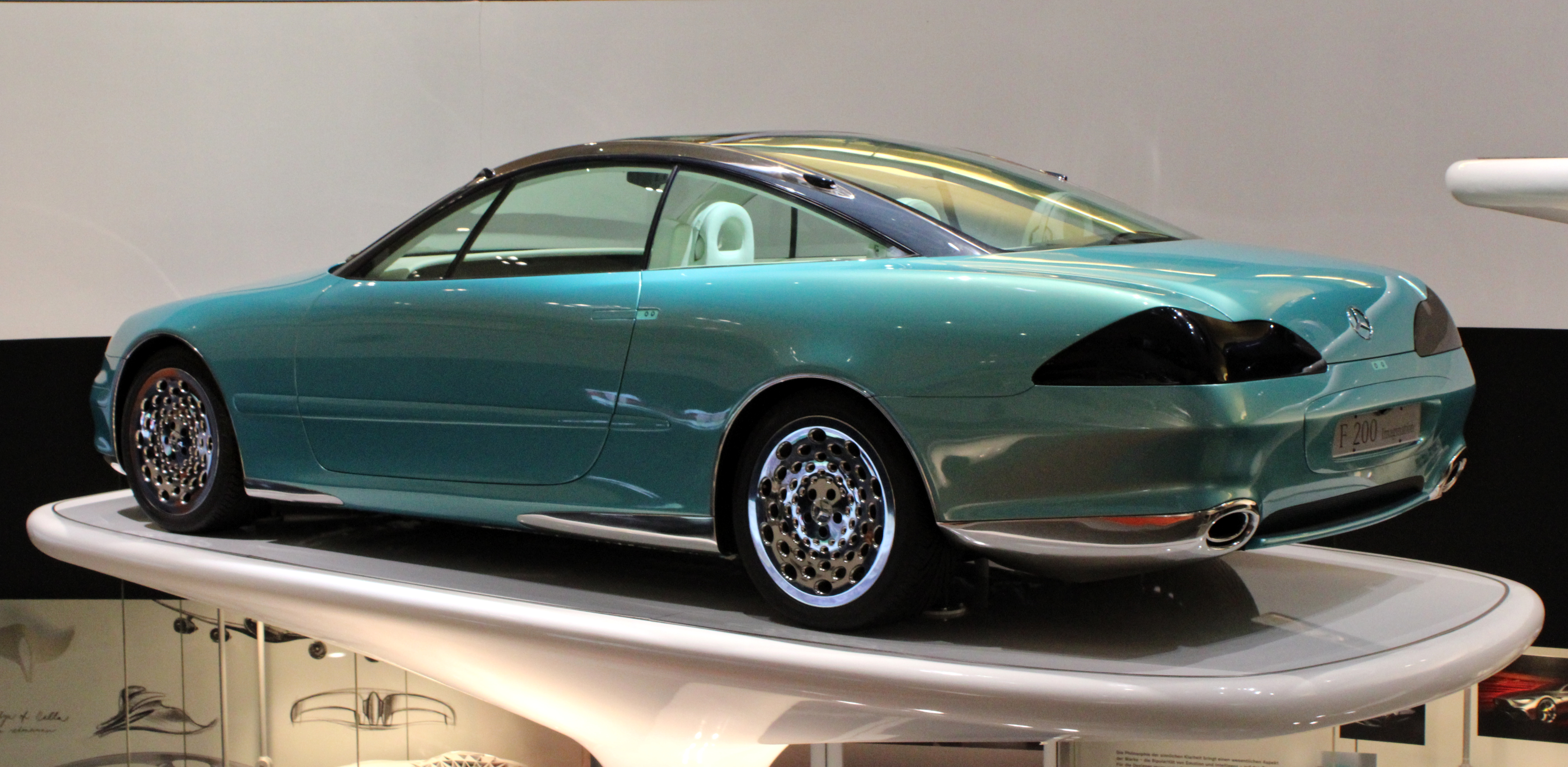
Rear 3/4 view

== Features ==
One of the most notable technologies on the F200 was the implementation of "Sidesticks". Sidesticks were a drive by joystick design (rather than the conventional steering wheel and gas/brake pedals) that could be toggled between the driver and passenger. Other features included:

- Drive by wire
- Electro-transparent panoramic roof glass (later used on the 2002 Maybach 62)
- Video cameras in the place of rear view mirrors.
- Window-Airbag (series launch in the Mercedes-Benz S-Class (W220)).
- Forward-looking dynamic handling control system
- A notable feature was the Active Body Control fully active suspension, which entered series production on another coupe, the CL-Class, in 1999.
- Headlight system featuring variable light distribution. Production launch as bi-xenon headlights with Active Light Function in 2003 on the Mercedes-Benz E-Class (W211)
- Voice recognition for mobile phones. Production launch under the name LINGUATRONIC in the Mercedes-Benz S-Class (W140) in 1996.
- Automatically opening dihedral doors and trunk that opened using a magnetic card

== Urban legend fame ==
In the early 2000s, the F200 gained popularity as pictures of it were being mass mailed out under the subject of "The New Benz - very different... really different!". Many of the emails incorrectly claimed the car to be the new "SCL600". The intent of the email was to draw sarcasm from the radical designs of the car and its Sidesticks control system.

== Gallery ==
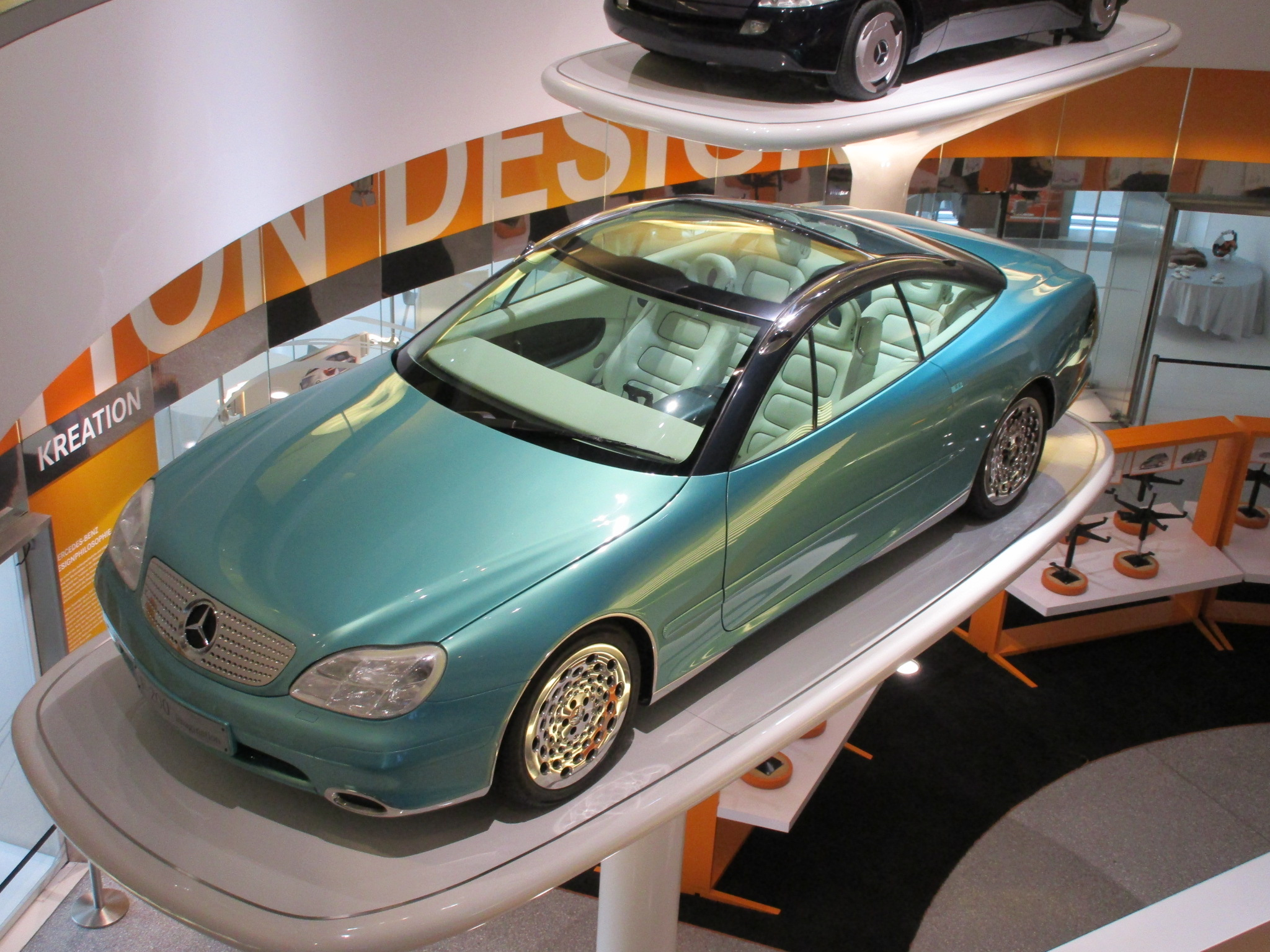
F200 Imagination at the Mercedes-Benz Museum

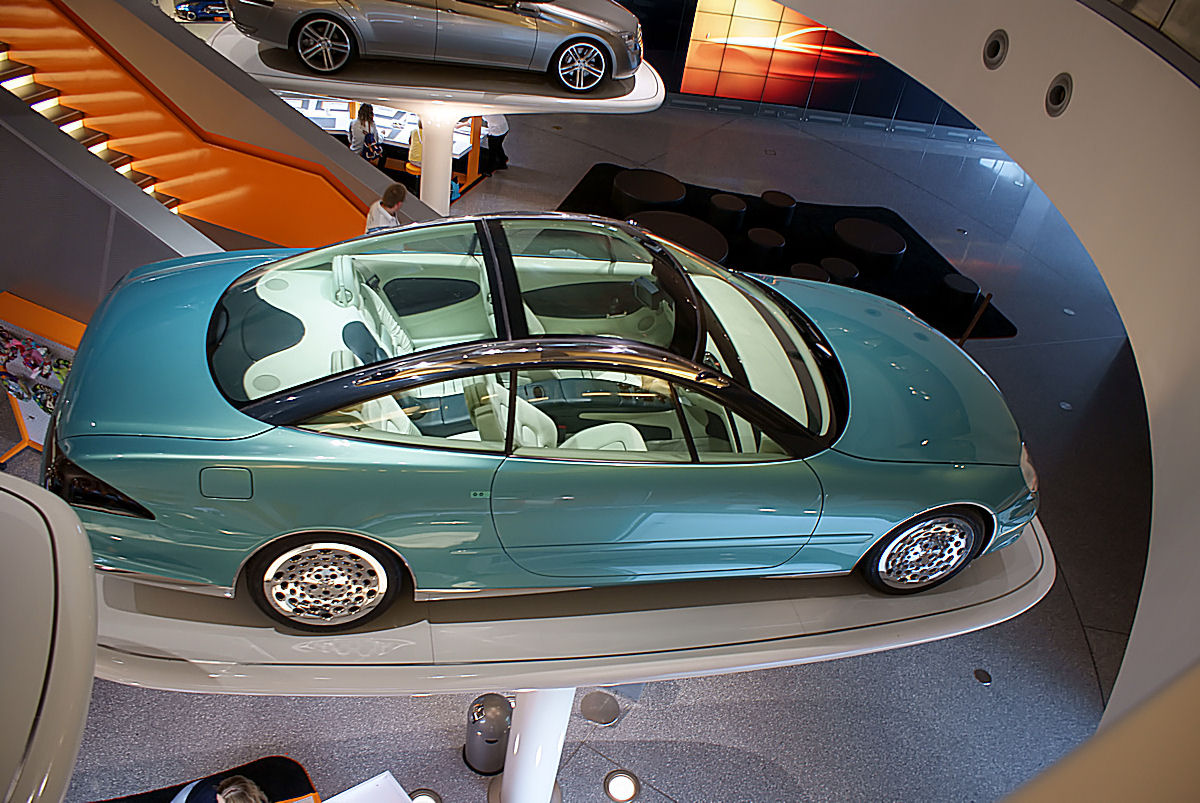
View from above, showing the interior

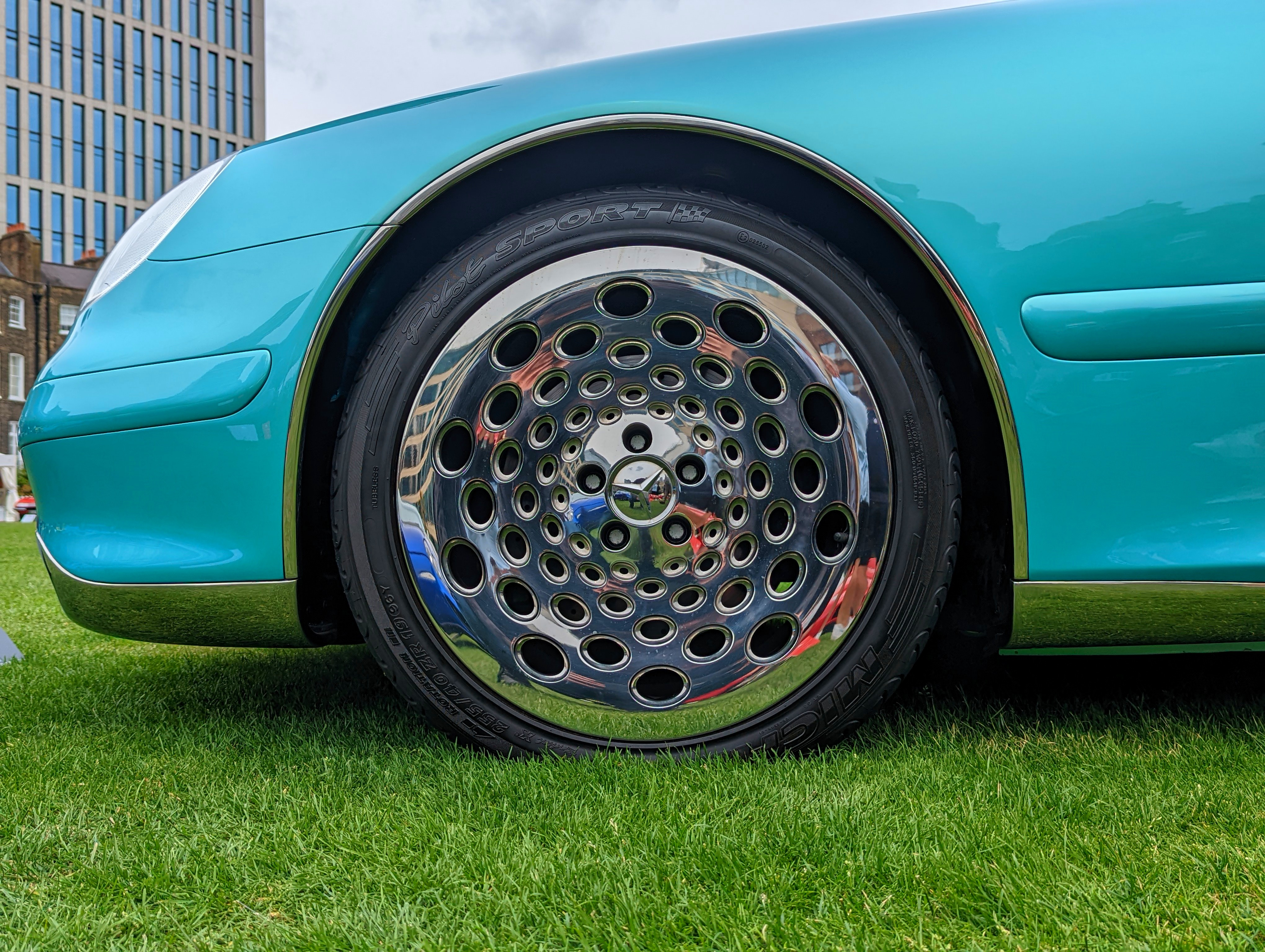
Close up of one of the wheels
