= Koenigsegg Jesko =

Mid-engine sports car

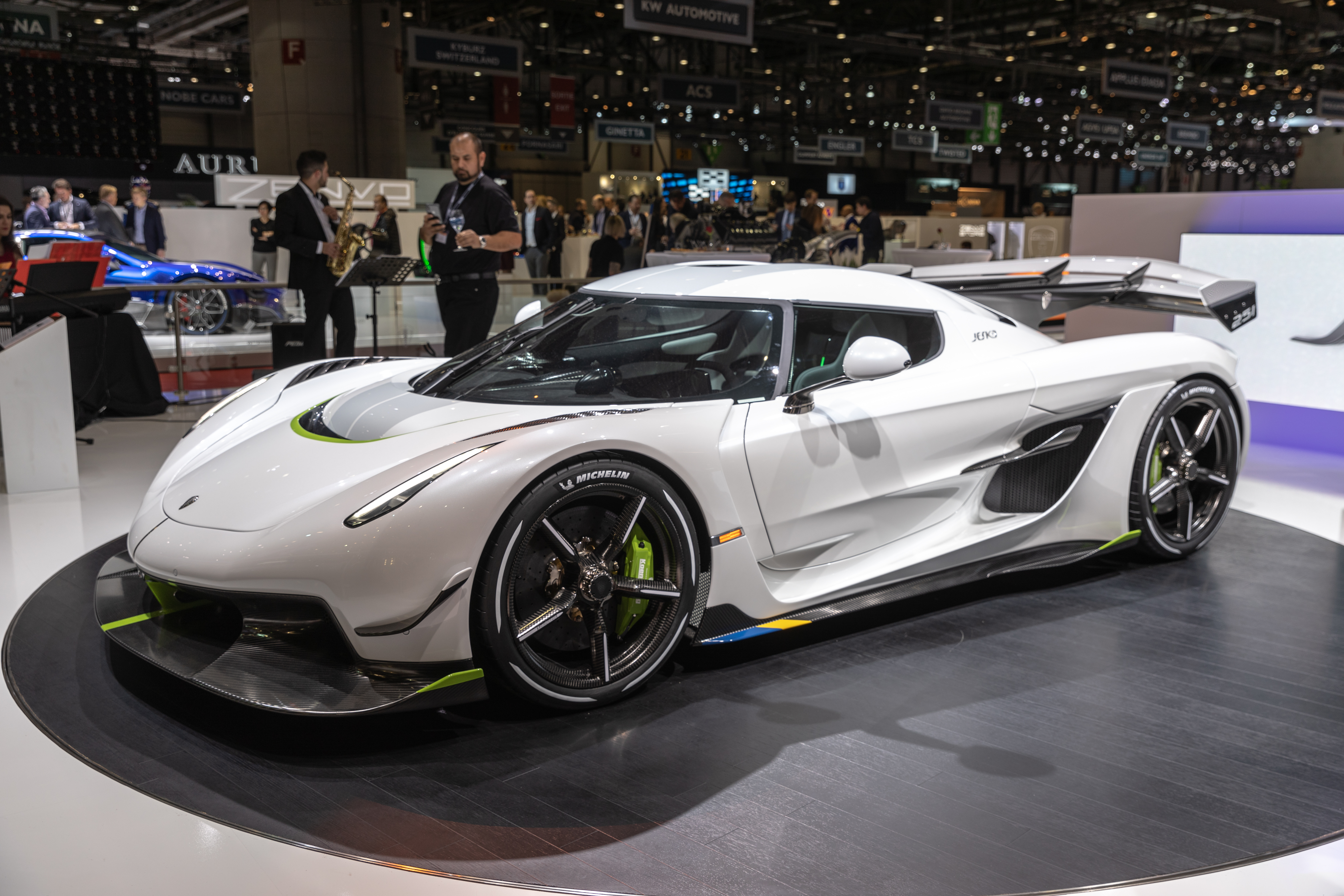
- Pre-production model of the Jesko Attack at the 2019 Geneva International Motor Show

Overview
- Manufacturer: Koenigsegg
- Production: 2020–2026; 125 units planned
- Designer: Christian von Koenigsegg; Joachim Nordwall

Body and chassis
- Class: Sports car (S)
- Body style: 2-door targa top
- Layout: Rear mid-engine, rear-wheel-drive
- Doors: Dihedral synchro-helix

Powertrain
- Engine: 5,065 cc (5.1 L; 309 cu in) twin-turbocharged V8
- Power output: 1,280 hp (1,298 PS; 954 kW) (petrol); 1,600 hp (1,622 PS; 1,193 kW) (E85)
- Transmission: 9-speed Koenigsegg LST multi-clutch

Dimensions
- Wheelbase: 2,700 mm (106.3 in)
- Length: Jesko Attack: 4,626 mm (182.1 in); Jesko Absolut: 4,845 mm (190.7 in)
- Width: 2,030 mm (79.9 in)
- Height: 1,210 mm (47.6 in)
- Kerb weight: Jesko Attack: 1,420 kg (3,131 lb); 1,320 kg (2,910 lb) (dry weight); Jesko Absolut: 1,390 kg (3,064 lb); 1,290 kg (2,844 lb) (dry weight)

Chronology
- Predecessor: Koenigsegg Agera

The Koenigsegg Jesko is a limited production mid-engine sports car produced by the Swedish automobile manufacturer Koenigsegg Automotive AB. The car was introduced at the 2019 Geneva Motor Show and was completely sold out before the show ended. Succeeding the Agera, the Jesko is named as a tribute to the company founder's father, Jesko von Koenigsegg. There are three variations of the car: the "Absolut", "Attack", and "Sadair's Spear".

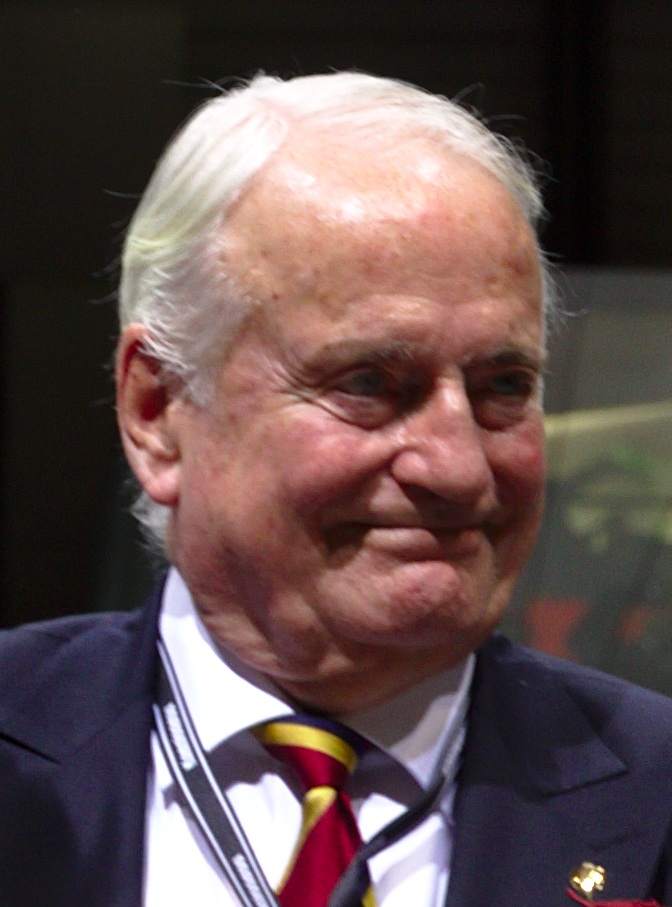
The automobile is named after Jesko von Koenigsegg, the father of Christian von Koenigsegg

== Specifications ==
=== Engine ===
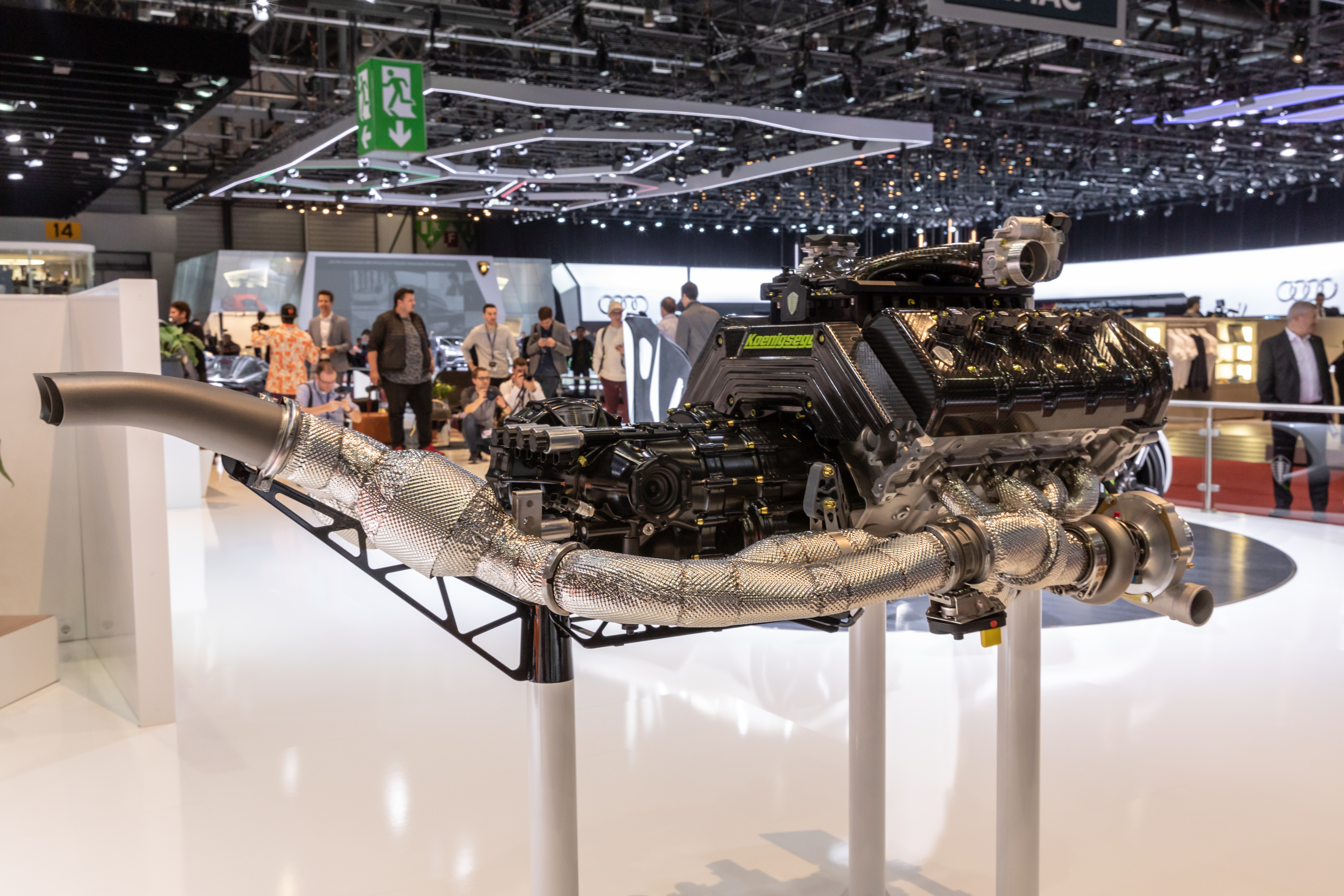
The 5.0-litre twin-turbocharged V8 engine used in the Jesko along with the exhaust system

The engine is a development of the 5.1 L (5,065 cc) twin-turbocharged V8 engine used in the Agera. It has four valves per cylinder each with a bore and stroke of 92 mm × 95.25 mm (3.62 by 3.75 inches) and a compression ratio of 8.6:1. The engine has a power output of 1,280 hp (1,298 PS; 954 kW) at 7,800 rpm and 1,000 N⋅m (738 lb⋅ft) of torque at 2,700 to 6,170 rpm on normal petrol and has a power output of 1,600 hp (1,622 PS; 1,193 kW) and 1,500 N⋅m (1,106 lb⋅ft) of torque at 5,100 rpm on E85 biofuel.

Changes from the Agera's engine include the use of a new 180-degree flat-plane crankshaft that saves 5 kg (11 lb) and increases the redline from 8,250 rpm to 8,500 rpm. The Jesko also utilises active rubber mounts from the Regera that reduce engine vibrations in the cabin. The two large turbochargers are equipped with a 20-litre air tank made from carbon fibre, coupled with an electric compressor which feeds pressurised air to the turbochargers at a pressure of 20 bar (290 psi) in order to reduce turbo lag. The engine has pressure sensors for each cylinder in order to achieve real time cylinder monitoring for the multipoint fuel injection system.

=== Transmission ===
The engine is mated to an in-house developed 10-speed multi-clutch transmission called the "Light Speed Transmission (LST)" by the manufacturer. The new transmission has a weight of 90 kg (198 lb) and it is at least 50% shorter in length than the previous 7-speed dual-clutch unit. It has 9 forward gear combinations using a layout with an input shaft with 3 fixed gears which is mated to a secondary shaft with 3 gears fixed to the output shaft and 3 clutched gears mated to the input shaft and an output shaft with 4 clutched gears (one set is used for reverse which mates directly to the input shaft), allowing the transmission to change gears without an interruption in power delivery due to the speedy nature of clutch actuation and overlap between the clutches opening and closing. The engine's crankshaft is mated directly to the LST and uses the rotating mass of the transmission components in place of a traditional flywheel. The transmission has a shift time ranging from 20 to 30 milliseconds. It also has an overdrive mode called "Ultimate Power on Demand" that is designed to skip directly to the optimal gear depending on user input, rather than down or upshifting sequentially to that gear.

The transmission is controlled by an onboard computer which uses engine and road speed data to engage a gear. Gears are selected by the driver either using the shift paddles mounted on the steering column or the gear selector.

Gear	Ratio
1st gear	4.7200:1
2nd gear	3.6441:1
3rd gear	2.8744:1
4th gear	2.2500:1
5th gear	1.7371:1
6th gear	1.3702:1
7th gear	1.0783:1
8th gear	0.8325:1
9th gear	0.6566:1

=== Chassis and suspension ===
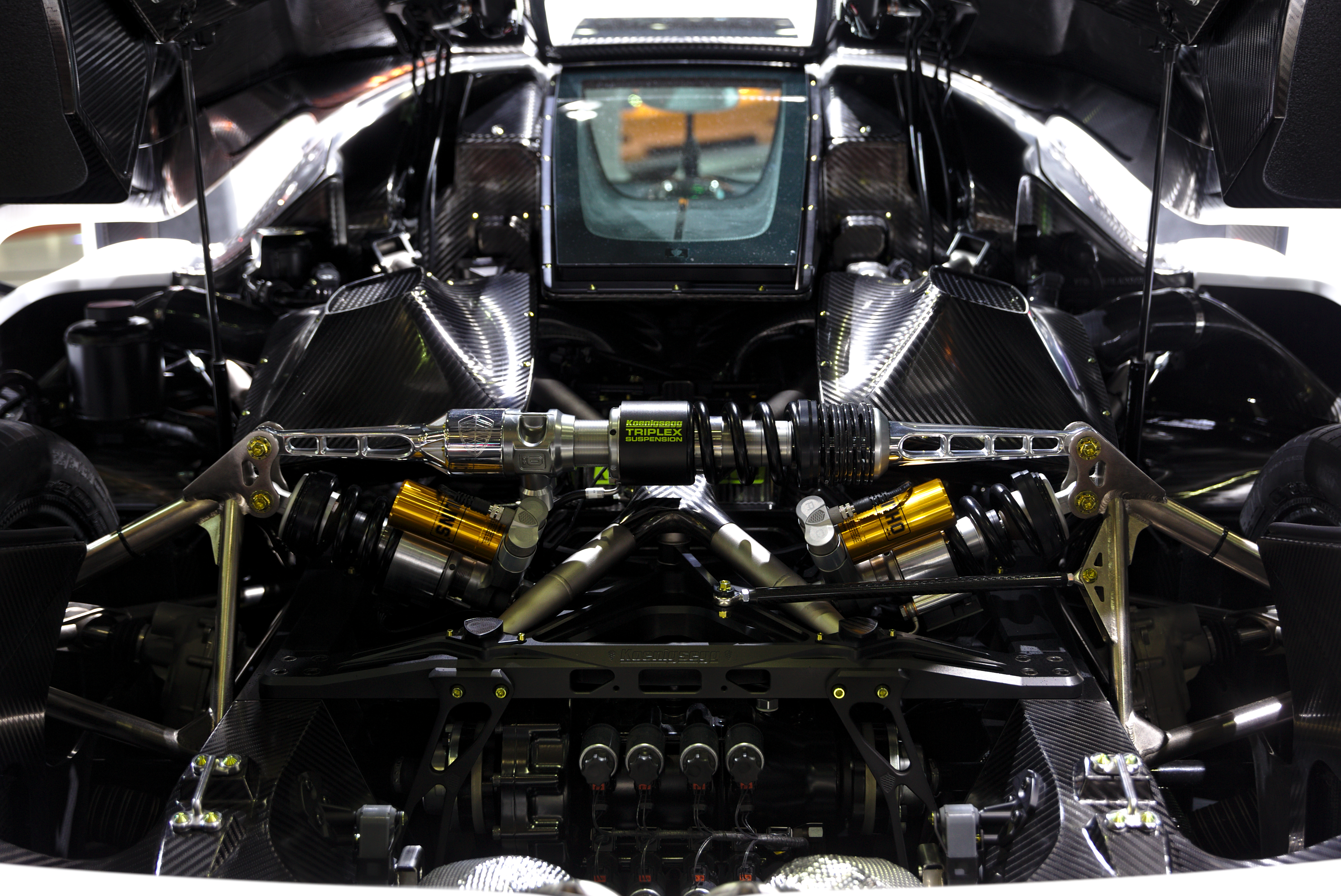
The Triplex damper system in the Jesko

Unlike its predecessors, the high-downforce Attack variant of the Jesko has Koenigsegg's 'Triplex' dampers at the front and the rear combined with traditional Öhlins dampers. A horizontal rear damper prevents the rear from pressing on the ground during hard acceleration. The front dampers stabilise the car at high speeds while active rear wheel steering ensures further stability at all performance levels.

The carbon body tub used in the Jesko is 40 mm (2 in) longer and 22 mm (1 in) wider from that of its predecessor in order to allow for more passenger room. The tub has been redesigned and incorporates an aluminium monocoque structure for increased rigidity.

=== Wheels, brakes and tires ===
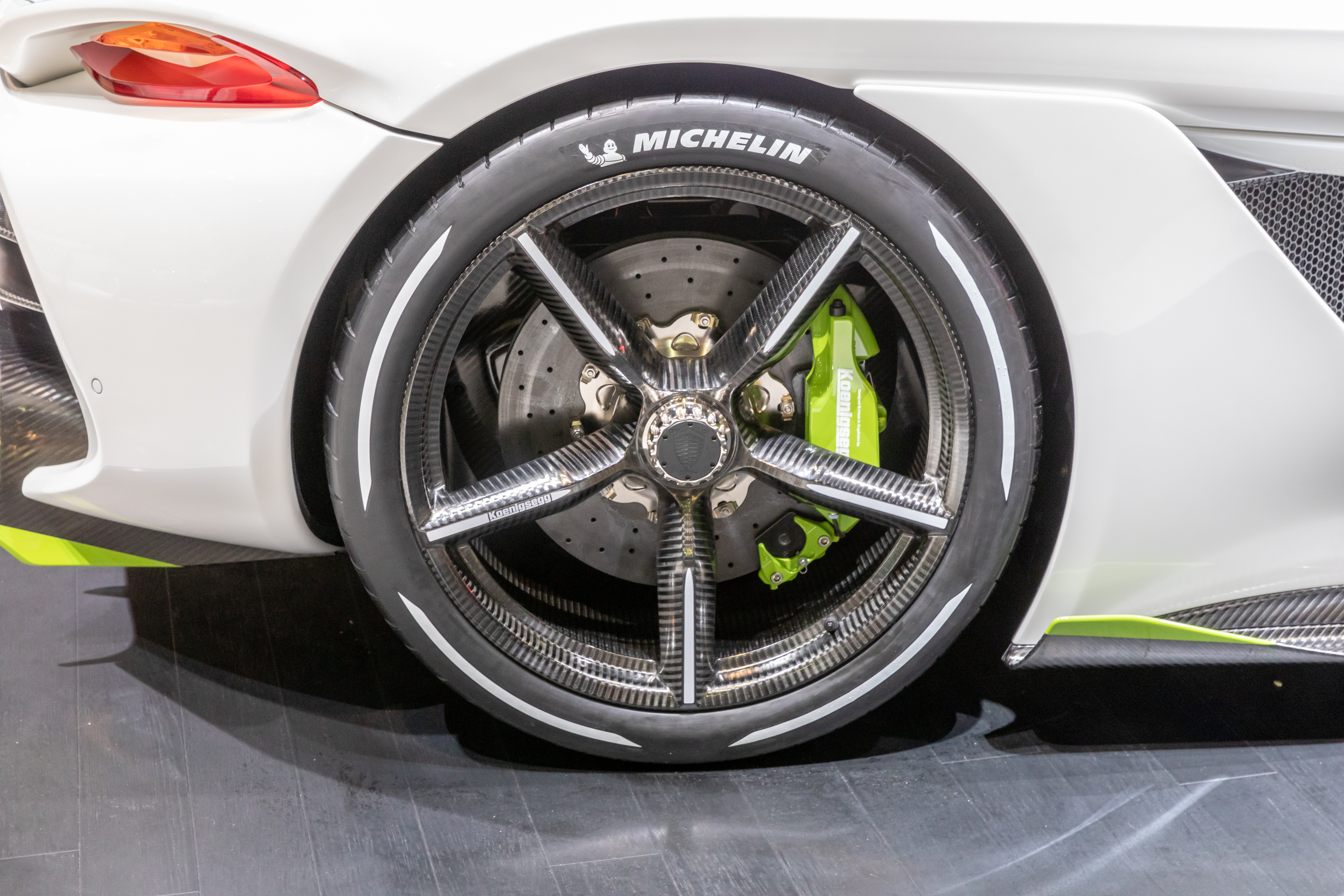
The optional carbon fibre aircore wheels showing the carbon ceramic brakes

The car comes standard with forged aluminium centre lock wheels, with diameters of 20 inches at the front and 21 inches at the rear. Lighter carbon fibre wheels are available as an option, weighing 5.9 kg (13 lb) at the front and 7.7 kg (17 lb) at the rear. The tyres are Michelin Pilot Sport Cup 2's with codes of 265/35 20 for the front and 345/30 21 for the rear. Michelin Pilot Sport Cup 2 R tyres dedicated for track driving are also available as an option. The braking system uses ventilated carbon-ceramic discs.

=== Interior ===
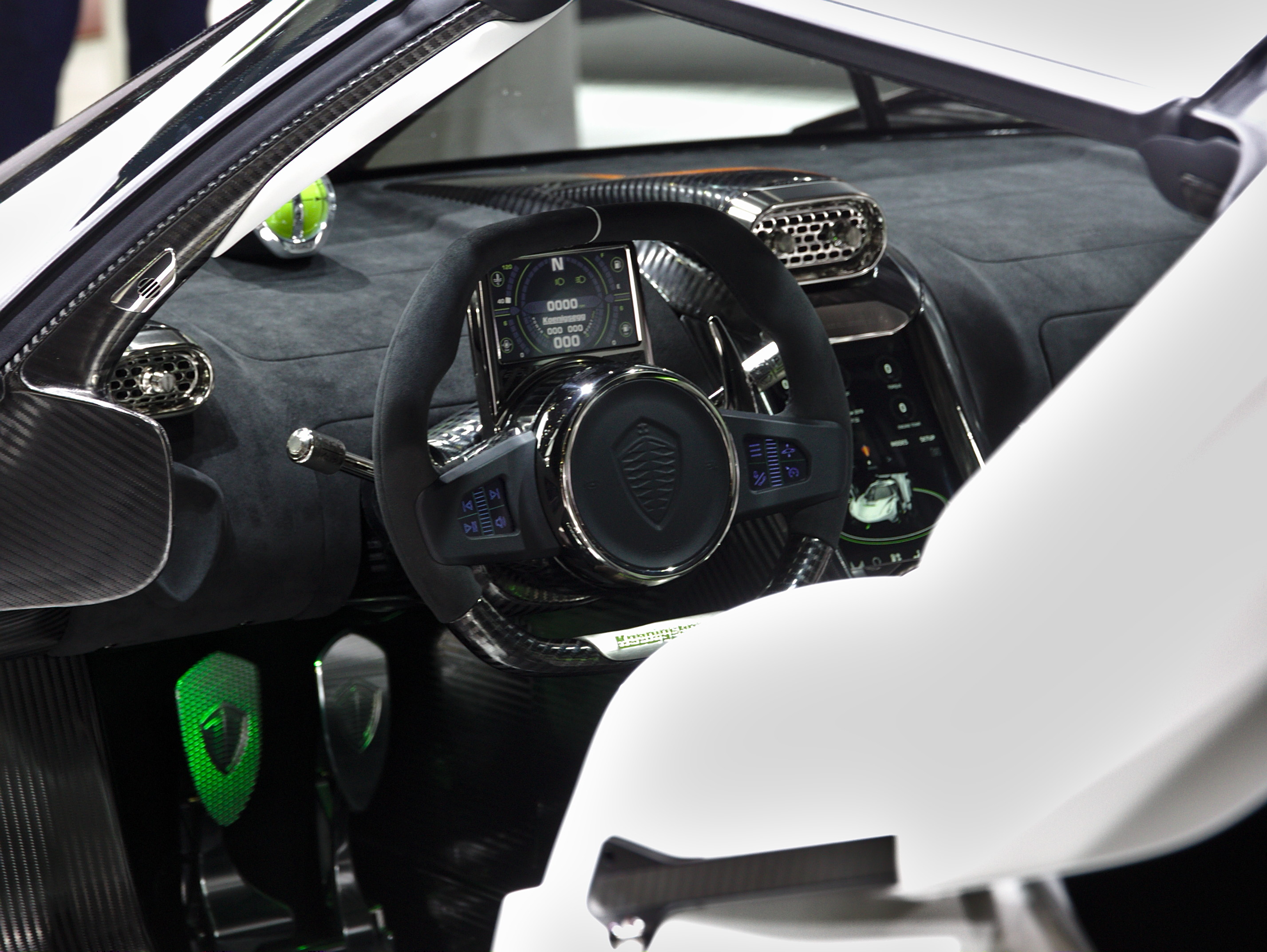
Interior

The use of a redesigned monocoque improves leg and headroom in the interior of the Jesko when compared to previous Koenigsegg models. Though weight saving is a priority for interior features, the car is still equipped with amenities such as a climate control system, an infotainment system with a 9.0-inch screen, Apple CarPlay and USB phone charging. The car has unique screens mounted in the steering wheel spokes and a 5.0-inch screen mounted behind the steering wheel displaying vital information to the driver. The seats will be made from hollow carbon fibre but will be electrically adjustable.

=== Exterior ===
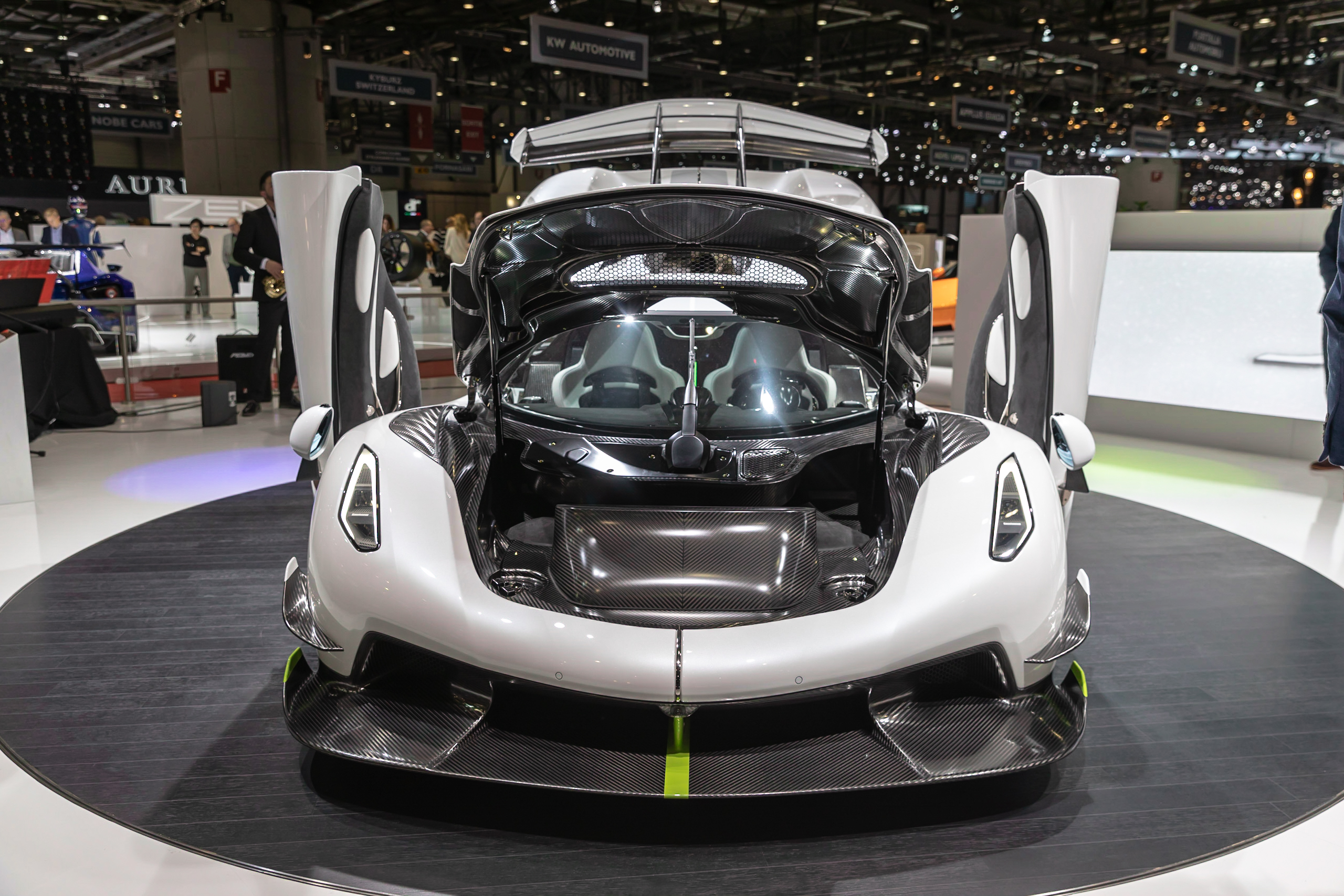
The user accessible compartments open along with doors

The Jesko shares Koenigsegg's 'Autoskin' capabilities from the Regera, allowing for remote operation of doors and the hood. It is also possible to hydraulically lift the front and rear axles of the car to give additional ground clearance. The doors have been redesigned so that they open further outward and have more ground clearance while open. The roof has screws in order to ensure it remains in place during high speed driving.

== Production ==
Production of the Jesko will be limited to 125 units, with 40–50 units being produced each year. Unlike its predecessors, the Jesko will be homologated worldwide. It was announced in March 2019 that all the build slots of the Jesko were sold out.

The Jesko will be offered in either a high-downforce Attack or low-drag Absolut configuration, with subtle differences between the two variants. The Attack variant, as shown at the 2019 Geneva Motor Show, comes equipped with the dual front and rear 'Triplex' damper system and added aerodynamic features for track use. Due to this dual suspension setup, it is not possible to store the Targa roof in the front of the car, although this is possible in the Absolut as it will not have a front 'Triplex' damper system or front hood air dam. In July 2021, Koenigsegg revealed the first pre-series production Jesko and claimed that the first Jesko customer cars are slated for delivery in spring 2022. The first car was delivered in June 2023.

== Variants ==
=== Jesko Attack ===
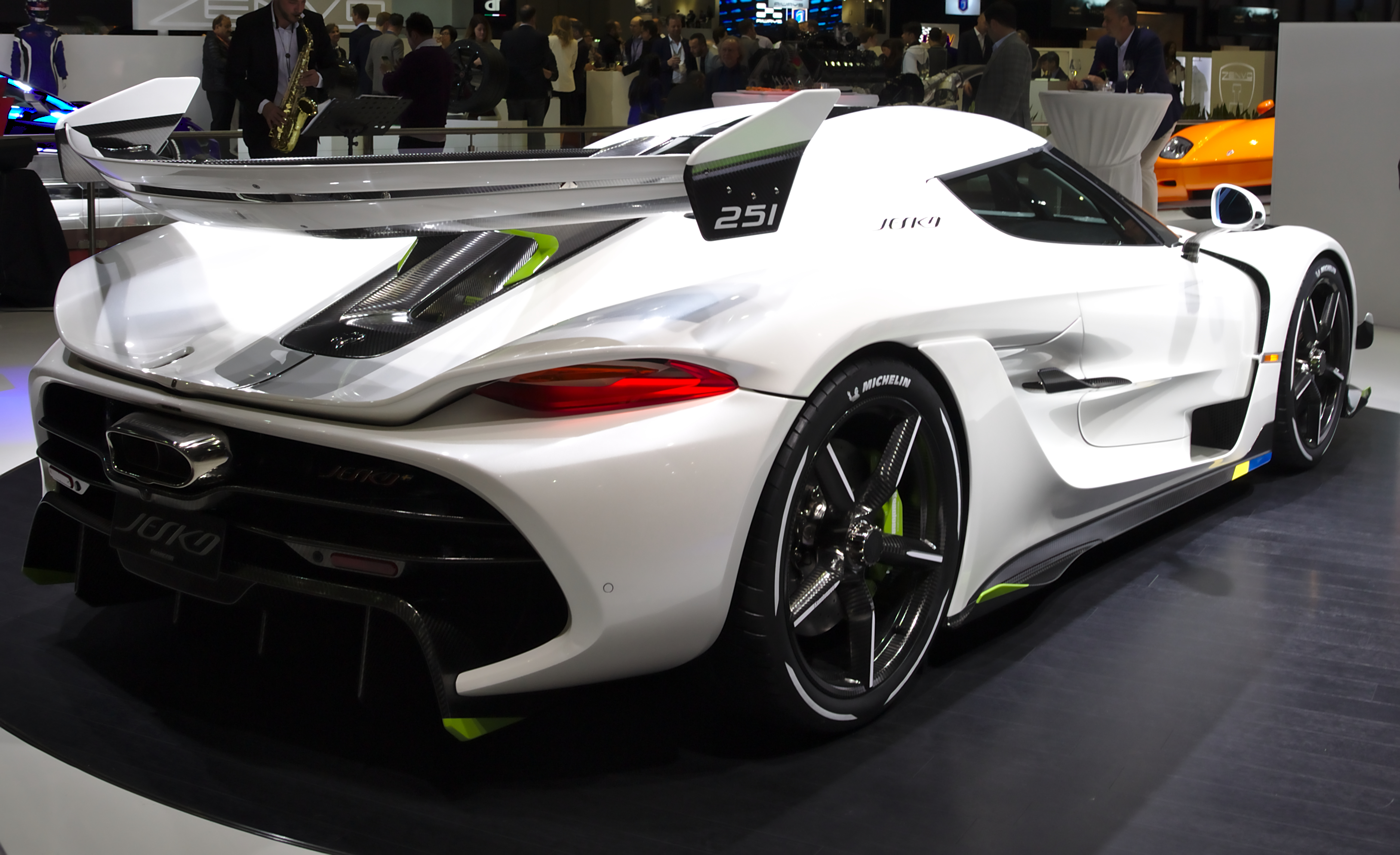
View of the boomerang rear wing

The Jesko Attack is the high-downforce, default version of the Jesko. This variant has a large rear wing and a large carbon fiber front splitter that Koenigsegg claims to generate 800 kg (1,764 lb) of downforce at 249 km/h (155 mph), 1,000 kg (2,205 lb) at 275 km/h (171 mph) and 1,400 kg (3,086 lb) at its top speed. This car lapped the Gotland Ring in 2:56.97, beating the former record set by a Porsche 911 GT3 RS Manthey-Racing edition by nearly seven seconds. The car also lapped the Laguna Seca in 1:24.86.

=== Jesko Absolut ===
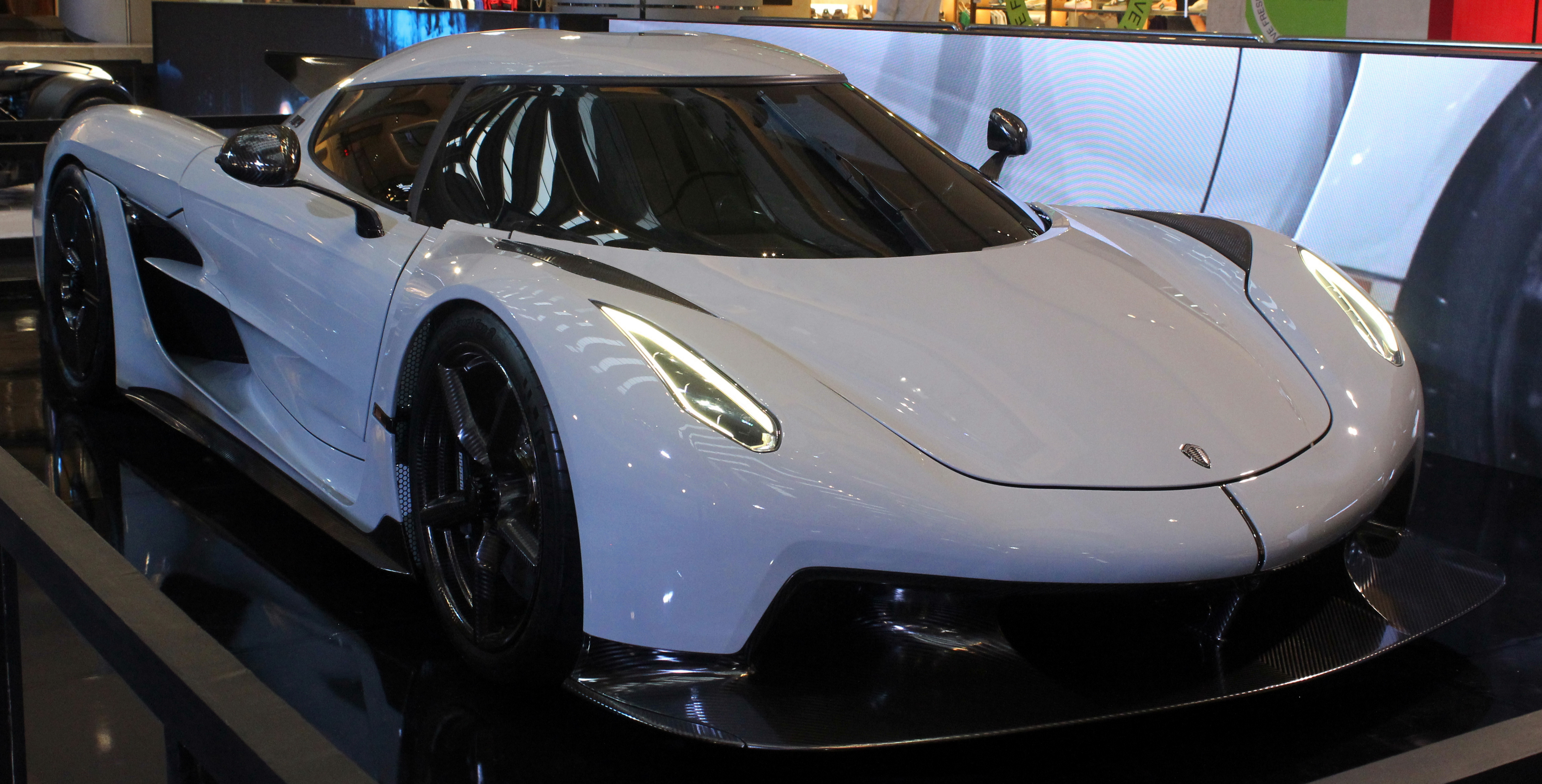
Koenigsegg Jesko Absolut front view

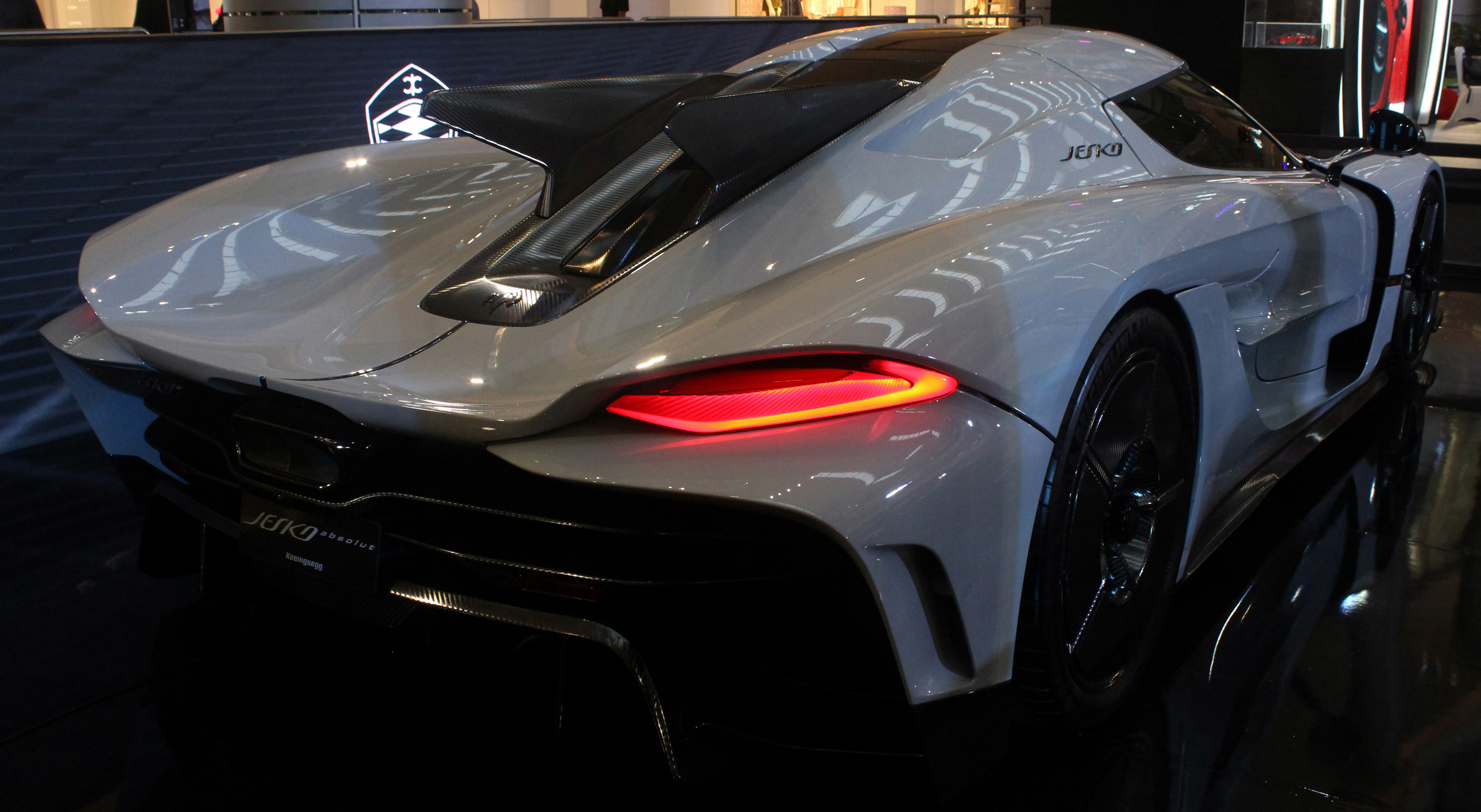
Koenigsegg Jesko Absolut rear view

Unveiled online alongside the Gemera on 3 March 2020, the Jesko Absolut is a high speed version of the Jesko. The rear wing on the Jesko Attack is replaced by two rear fins which enable a reduction in downforce from 1,400 kg (3,086 lb) to 150 kg (331 lb) and a drag coefficient of Cd=0.278. The front splitter and side winglets are removed and the front louvers are smoother with the rear wheels featuring removable covers for high speed stability. The vehicle is also slightly elongated featuring a rear extension which adds 85 mm (3 in) of additional length. The engine and transmission remain the same as the Jesko Attack. 3,000 hours were spent on the aerodynamic analysis, while an additional 5,000 hours were spent on the design and engineering work of the Absolut. The Absolut will be priced higher than the Attack due to the development work taken to lower the drag coefficient. The Jesko Absolut is estimated by the manufacturer to have a top speed of 500 km/h (310 mph), with theoretical speeds as high as 531–563 km/h (330–350 mph).

=== Sadair's Spear ===
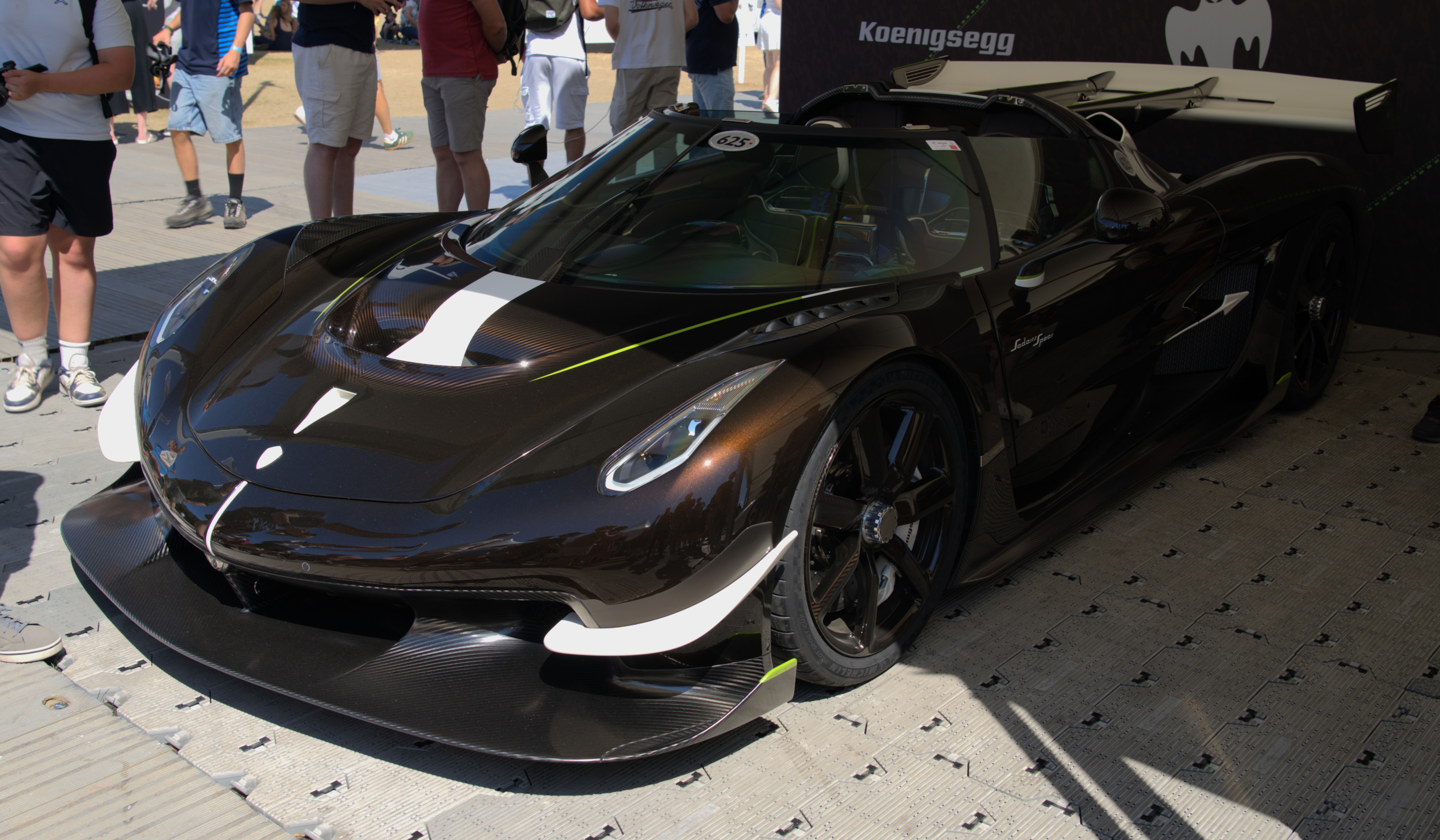
Sadair's Spear Front

The Koenigsegg Sadair's Spear is a high-performance variant of the Koenigsegg Jesko. The car was named after Sadair's Spear, a horse, which Jesko von Koenigsegg had in his final race when he was a jockey. Designed primarily for extreme track performance, the "Sadair Spear" is powered by a 5.0-litre twin-turbocharged V8 engine producing up to 1,300 hp (969 kW) or 1,625 hp (1,212 kW) when running on E85 biofuel. It features an advanced aerodynamics package, a lightweight carbon fiber monocoque, and Koenigsegg's proprietary 9-speed Light Speed Transmission (LST), enabling near-instant gear changes. The vehicle emphasizes sharp lines and track-aimed design. On the Gotland Ring it already beats Jesko Attack by 1.1 seconds. Top speed is narrowed to 360 km/h (224 mph). Production is limited to just 30 units.

== World record ==
On 26 June 2024, the Jesko Absolut broke the 0–400–0 km/h (0–249–0 mph) acceleration record with a time of 27.83 seconds. The record was set at the Örebro Airport, Sweden by factory test driver Markus Lundh.

Record	Time
0–400 km/h	18.82 sec
0–250 mph	19.20 sec
0–400–0 km/h	27.83 sec
0–250–0 mph	28.27 sec

On 7 August 2025, the Jesko Absolut again broke the 0–400–0 km/h acceleration record with an improved time of 25.21 seconds.

Record	Time
0–400 km/h	16.77 sec
0–250 mph	17.18 sec
0–400–0 km/h	25.21 sec
0–250–0 mph	25.67 sec

== Awards ==
- Top Gear – Award 2022 – Hypercar of the Year

== See also ==
- List of production cars by power output
