= Koenigsegg CC =

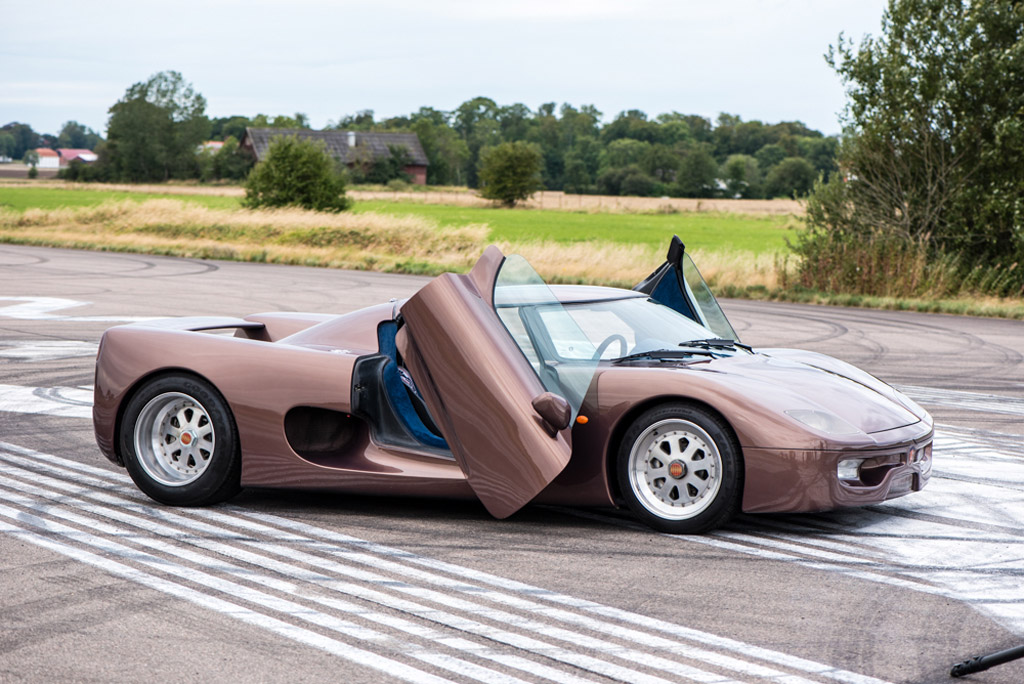

Overview
- Manufacturer: Koenigsegg Automotive AB
- Production: 1994–2000; 3 functional prototypes produced
- Assembly: Sweden: Ängelholm
- Designer: Christian von Koenigsegg; David Crafoord

Body and chassis
- Class: Sports car/ Concept car
- Body style: 2-door Targa top
- Layout: Rear mid-engine, rear-wheel-drive
- Doors: Dihedral Synchro-Helix

Powertrain
- Engine: 4.6 L Ford Modular supercharged V8
- Transmission: 6-speed manual

The Koenigsegg CC is a prototype car made by the Swedish automobile manufacturer Koenigsegg.

== Overview ==
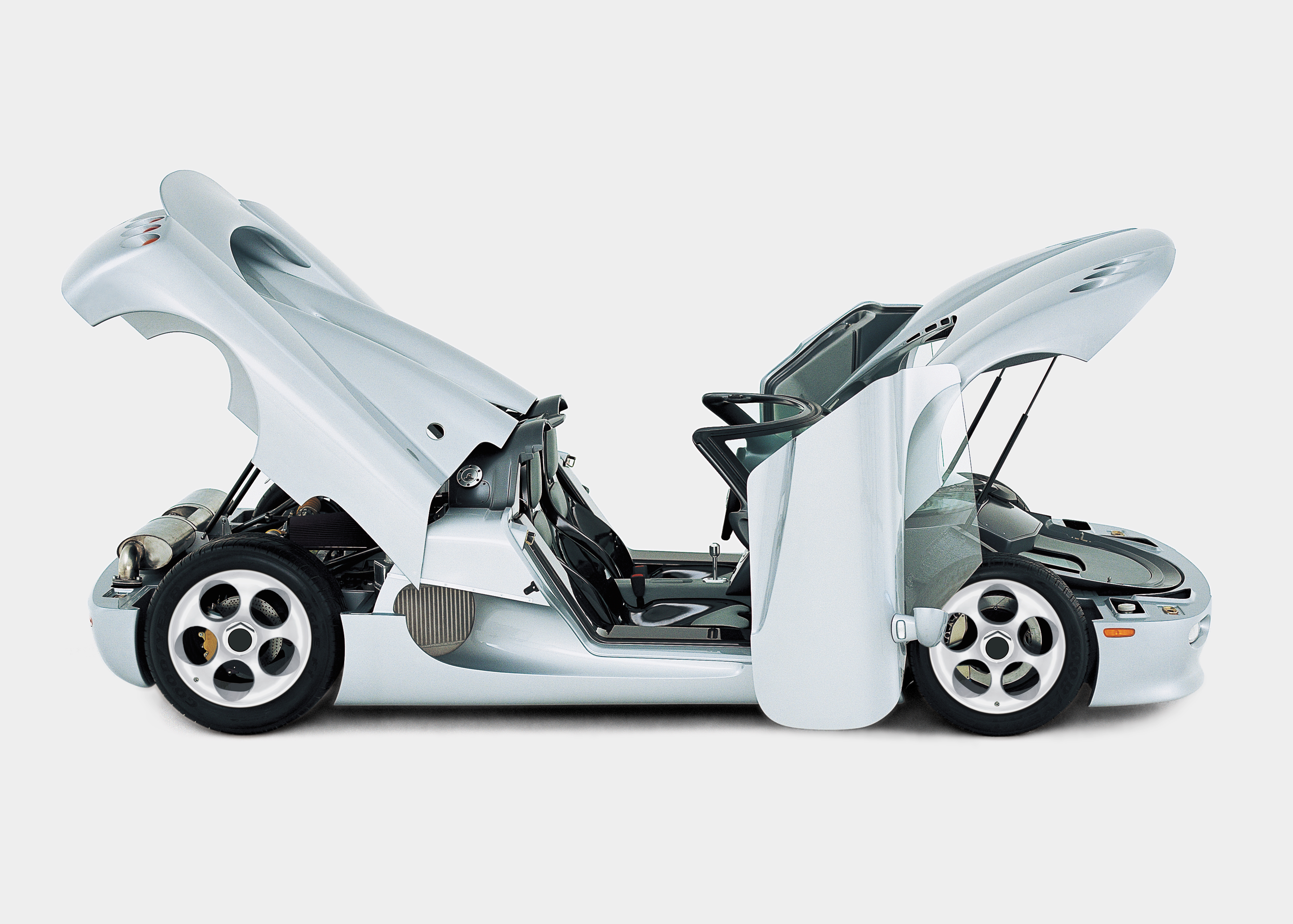
2000 Koenigsegg CC prototype

Work on the car started in 1994. Koenigsegg wanted to build a sports car that could exceed the standards set by the McLaren F1 at the time, and achieve speeds over the 386 km/h (240 mph) set by the F1 in 1997. The design of the CC was inspired by the McLaren F1 along with the Ferrari F40. The car, initially painted silver, was then painted black when the new dihedral helix synchro actuation doors were fitted, and finally was painted its current colour. Other two prototypes included the white European spec prototype which was produced in 2000 and the other was a pre-production version of the CC8S, and was the first ever CC8S Koenigsegg produced.

The deal with Audi for the use of their 4.2 V8 fell flat after the car's designer, Christian von Koenigsegg, made clear his intent of tuning the V8 far beyond its standard output. The next candidate was the Flat-12 race engine developed by Motori Moderni for the Scuderia Coloni Formula One team, in which this engine was raced under the Subaru badge in the 1990 season. These Subaru 1235 engines were purchased and modified for use in the CC. This deal failed to materialise when the founder of Motori Moderni died, sending the company into bankruptcy. Following this, a deal was made with Ford for use of the Modular V8.
