= Christian von Koenigsegg =

CEO of Koenigsegg

- Born: Christian Erland Harald von Koenigsegg; 2 July 1972 (age 54); Stockholm, Sweden
- Known for: Founder and CEO of Koenigsegg Automotive
- Spouse: Halldora Tryggvadóttir (m. 2000)
- Children: 2
- Parent(s): Jesko von Koenigsegg (father); Brita Aasa (mother)
- Awards: FIA President Innovation Medal

Christian Erland Harald von Koenigsegg (born 2 July 1972) is a Swedish automotive engineer and entrepreneur. He is a descendant of the House and lineage of the Königsegg, a noble family from Germany. He is the founder and CEO of the Swedish high-performance automobile manufacturer Koenigsegg Automotive.

In 1994, Koenigsegg launched the "Koenigsegg project", which eventually became Koenigsegg Automotive. Together with designer David Crafoord, Koenigsegg created a design concept following his original sketches. The first prototype enabled the foundation of Koenigsegg Automotive. Koenigsegg and his wife, Halldora, are leading the company.

== Early life ==
Christian von Koenigsegg is the son of Jesko von Koenigsegg, CEO of JK Energiteknik, and fashionista Brita Aasa. The von Koenigsegg lineage is attested from A.D. 1171 and originates in Swabia, in the Holy Roman Empire, where his ancestors were knights (see Königsegg for details). The current logo of Koenigsegg Automotive is based on the Königsegg familial coat of arms.

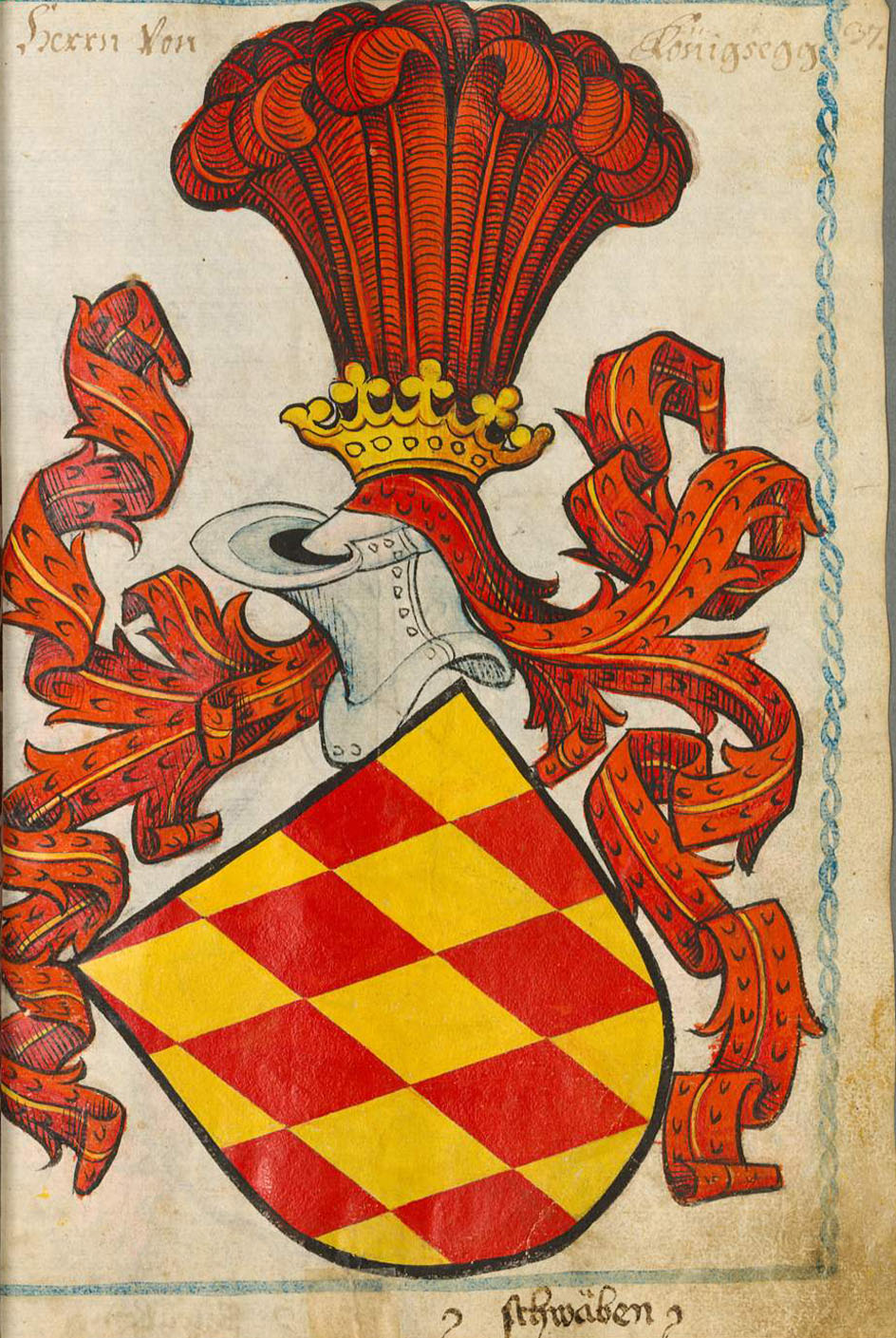
Königsegg familial coat of arms

Koenigsegg grew up in Stockholm, and spent a year in high school in Danderyd before enrolling at Lundsbergs boarding school, and then studied economics at the Scandinavian School of Brussels. He showed an interest in cars from an early age, starting at the age of five when he watched the stop-motion film The Pinchcliffe Grand Prix, about a bicycle builder who built a racing car, Il Tempo Gigante. When he was six years old, he drove a go-kart for the first time, and he vividly recalls this as "one of the best days of his life".

== Koenigsegg Automotive ==
Christian von Koenigsegg founded Koenigsegg Automotive AB in 1994 in hopes of producing a "world-class" sports car. This company was financed initially with money from Christian's previous business ventures. He also received $200,000 from the Swedish technical development board. Later Christian's father became an early investor and financed the operation for over 3 years. Halldora von Koenigsegg became involved in 2000 as the COO.

== Innovations ==
Christian von Koenigsegg has developed many innovations and is a named inventor on several patents:

US Patents

- US 7,958,871, Combustion Air Supply Arrangement
- US 8,800,510, Internal Combustion Engine Connected to Compressed-Air Tank
- US 8,807,929, Turbine Housing for a Supercharger
- US 9,988,952, Combustion Engine Including a Controllable Engine Valve, an innovation that uses electronics and air pressure to actuate intake and exhaust valves which provides very high precision and unlimited timing control, instead of the traditional camshaft, allowing for engines to be much more efficient by reducing weight and size of engines, while making each cylinder able to be controlled independently, allowing for more complete combustion.
- US 10,077,689, Combustion Engine and Gas Handling System for Valve Actuator
- US 10,119,435, Combustion Engine and Mantle Assembly Therefore
- US 10,184,361, Combustion Engine with Pneumatic Valve Return Spring
- US 10,662,687, Synchro Helix Door Actuation System
- US 10,668,801, Powertrain for a Vehicle
- US 11,046,168, Powertrain for a Vehicle
- US 11,292,213, Fiber-Reinforced Structures for a hollow core composite production system
- US 11,401,982, Multiple-Plate Wet Clutch for a direct drive transmission

Published US Patent Applications

- US 2022/0399595, Liquid Heat Transfer Mixture and Use Thereof for a dielectric coolant system

Swedish Patents

- SE 0401084L, Exhaust Purifier for Internal Combustion Engines with Pre-Catalyst

Other Innovations

- the click flooring system
- the Triplex rear suspension
- the top mounted active rear wing system
- the patented dual throttle compressor pressure relief system

== Personal life ==
Christian von Koenigsegg married Halldora Tryggvadóttir in 2000, and there are competing stories about where they met. Some sources say that they met during their studies in Brussels, while other sources say they met while in high school. They presently have 2 sons, Sebastian and Samuel. Sebastian von Koenigsegg currently works at Koenigsegg Automotive AB as a Brand & Content Manager. Koenigsegg has alopecia areata universalis, an autoimmune disorder in which the body turns against its own hair follicles.

== Honours ==
- 2024 EY Entrepreneur of the Year for Sweden
- 2023 FIA President Innovation Medal (December 2023)
- 2022 Business Achievement Award from the Swedish Royal Patriotic Society
- 2014 EY Entrepreneur Of The Year in South Sweden (February 2015)
- 2013 Entrepreneur Of The Year from Ängelholm Näringsliv (May 2014)
