= Cecomp =

- Industry: Automotive
- Founded: La Loggia, Turin, Italy (1978)
- Founder: Giovanni Forneris
- Headquarters: Turin, Italy
- Services: Engineering products and processes, building prototypes and cars, producing special windscreens
- Parent: Icona
- Website: Cecomp

CECOMP Spa (Centro Esperienze COstruzione Modelli e Prototipi) is an Italian automotive company established in 1978 by Giovanni Forneris and is based in La Loggia, Turin. The company specialises in developing prototypes and models for car manufacturers such as Lancia, Maserati and Toyota. Since 2011, the company has expanded into manufacturing, producing the electric Bluecar for the French Bolloré company.

Giovanni Forneris started his career with the Fiat Design Centre and moved on to other well known designers and coach builders in Turin, such as Giovanni Michelotti and Giorgetto Giugiaro.

Cecomp is a founding partner of the Icona Design Group, which specialises in exporting Italian design and engineering services to China.

== Projects ==
Notable projects include:

- Maserati Biturbo (1978)
- Lancia Delta S4 (1984)
- Toyota MRJ (1995)
- Lancia Fulvia Coupé Concept (2003)
- Bolloré Bluecar (2011)
- Icona Vulcano (2015)
- Microlino (2022)

== See also ==
- List of Italian companies
