= Icona Vulcano =

Italian-Chinese prototype supercar

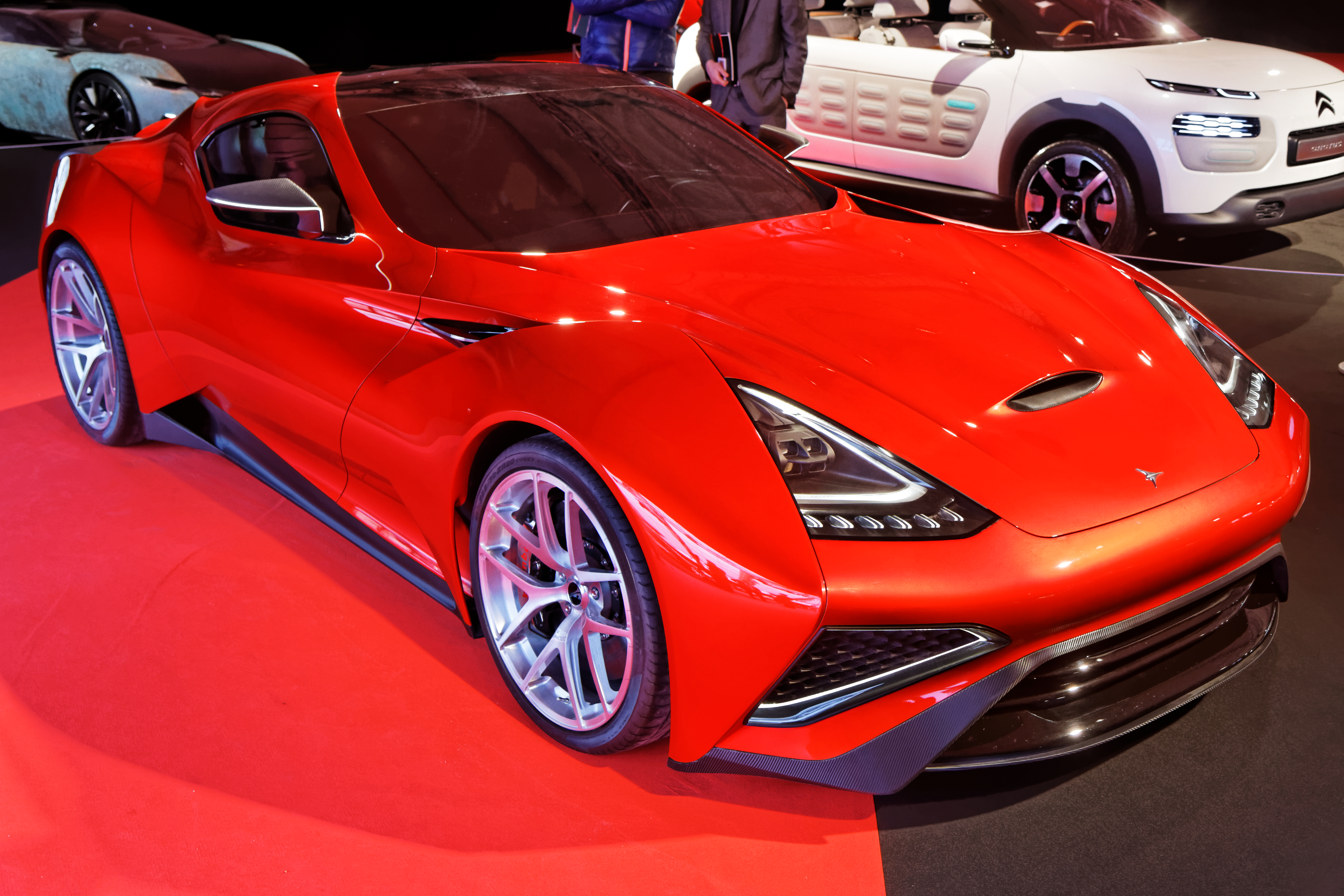

Overview
- Manufacturer: Icona Design
- Production: 2013
- Designer: Samuel Chuffart

Body and chassis
- Class: Sports car (S)
- Body style: 2-door coupé
- Layout: FR layout

Powertrain
- Engine: 3,800 cc twin-turbo V6 (H-Competizione); 6,262 cc F140 FE V12 (H-Turismo); 6,162 cc LS9 supercharged V8 (Titanium)
- Transmission: 7-speed automatic (H-Turismo, H-Competizione); Automac 6-speed automated manual (Titanium)

Dimensions
- Wheelbase: 2,698 mm (106.2 in)
- Length: 4,450 mm (175.2 in)
- Width: 1,940 mm (76.4 in)
- Height: 1,265 mm (49.8 in)
- Kerb weight: 1,595 kg (3,516 lb) (H-Turismo, Titanium); 1,635 kg (3,605 lb) (H-Competizione)

The Icona Vulcano is a sports car designed by Icona Design and manufactured by Cecomp. Only three have been built, each with a different powertrain.

== History ==
The Vulcano was presented at the Auto Shanghai in 2013. Designed by Samuel Chuffart, its production was limited to a single model, and its price was around 3 million euros.

== Specifications ==
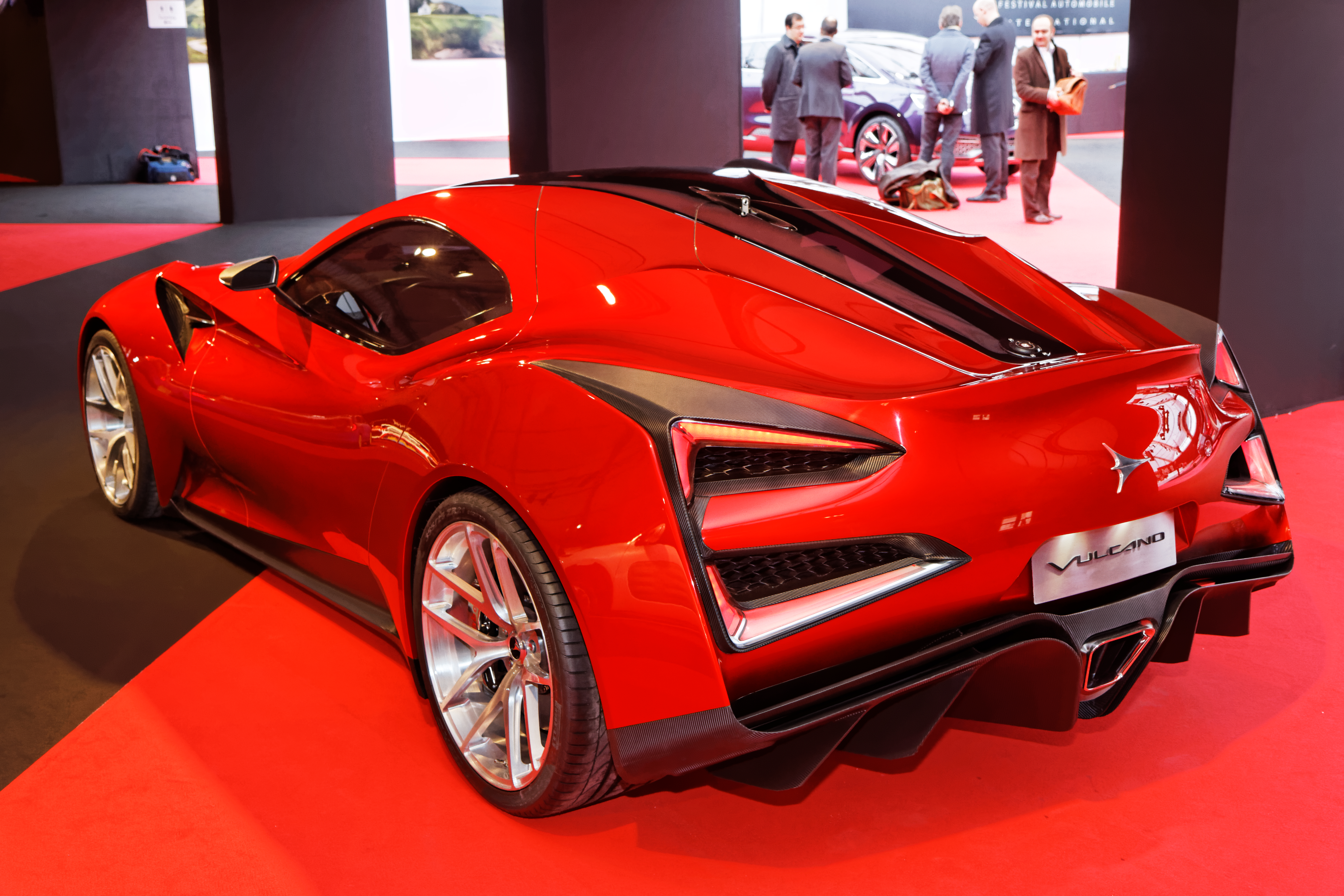
Rear 3/4 view

The Icona Vulcano's chassis is the work of former Ferrari director Claudio Lombardi, designer of multiple world champion cars. The vehicle was offered with a choice of two hybrid engines: the 950 horsepower (710 kW; 960 PS) H-Turismo, which consists of a V12 developing 790 horsepower (590 kW; 800 PS) combined with a 160 horsepower (120 kW; 160 PS) electric motor; and the 870 horsepower (650 kW; 880 PS) H-Competizione consisting of a 3.8-litre twin-turbo V6 combined with two electric motors. The exterior color is a shade described as "flamboyant red".

== Vulcano Titanium ==
The Vulcano Titanium is an improved version of the Vulcano, which is made of titanium. It is equipped with a 6.2 L supercharged V8 engine sourced from Chevrolet Corvette ZR1, developing 670 PS (493 kW; 661 hp) and 820 N⋅m (605 lb⋅ft) of torque. This allows it to accelerate from 0 to 100 km/h (62 mph) in 2.8 seconds, 0 to 200 km/h (124 mph) in 8.6 seconds, and reach a top speed of over 355 km/h (221 mph). Just like the Vulcano, only one Vulcano Titanium was produced, and its price was listed at 2.4 million euros. The interior features a modified steering wheel from the Ferrari 458, a TFT display used for the instrument cluster, a vertically-oriented TFT display for the infotainment system, an array of toggle switches, and seats made by Sabelt.
