= Isetta =

1950s Italian-designed microcar

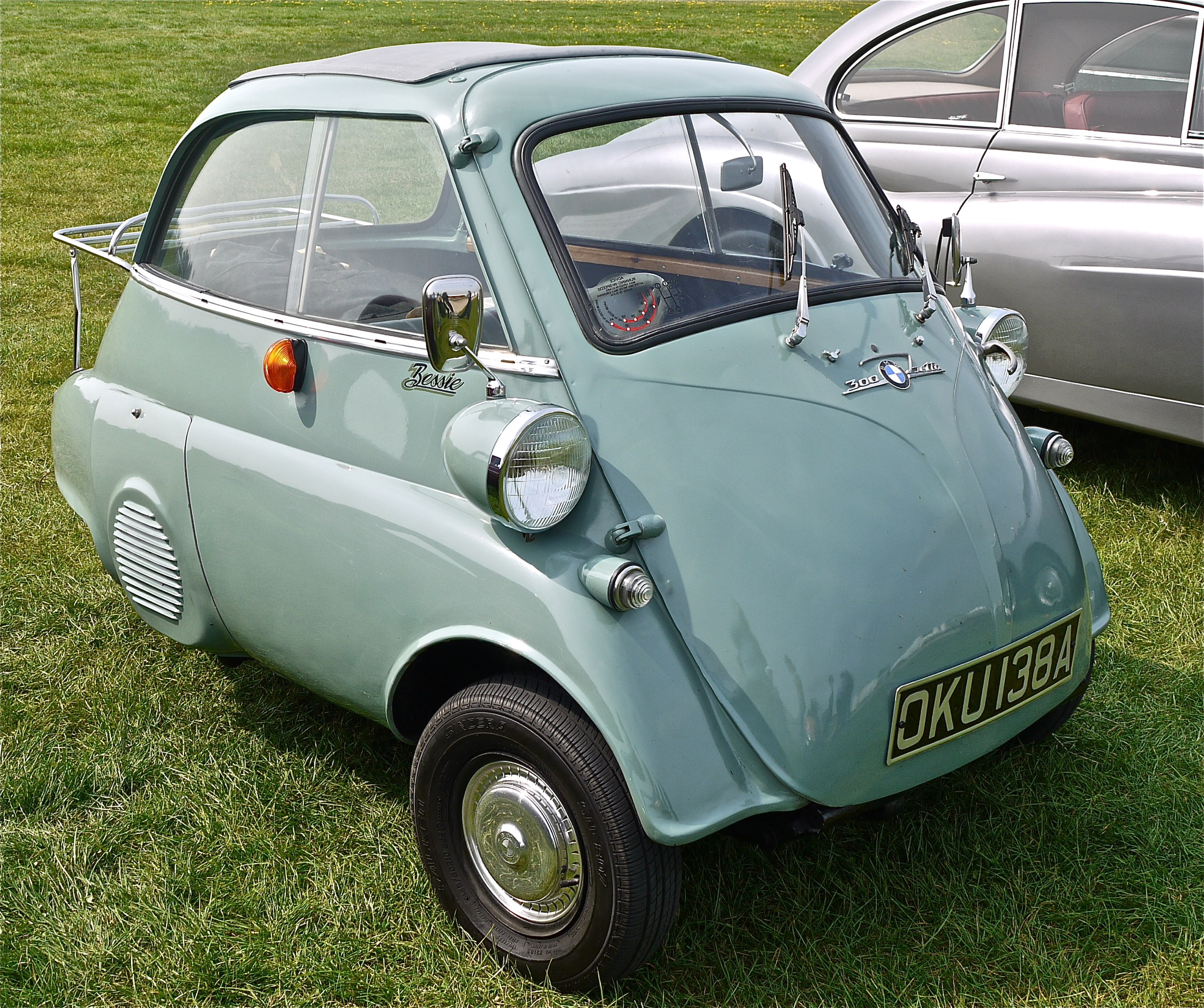

Overview
- Manufacturer: Iso Autoveicoli; BMW; VELAM; Romi
- Production: Iso Isetta (1953–56); BMW Isetta (1955–62); VELAM Isetta (1955–58); Romi-Isetta (1956–61)

Body and chassis
- Body style: Cabriolet; Van; Pick-up
- Layout: MR layout

The Isetta (Italian pronunciation: [iˈzetta]) is an Italian-designed microcar initially manufactured in 1953 by the Italian firm Iso SpA, and subsequently built under license in a number of different countries, including Argentina, Spain, Belgium, France, Brazil, Germany, and the United Kingdom. The name Isetta is the Italian diminutive form of Iso, meaning "little Iso". (Note: "By the early 1950s ISO had established itself as a builder of motor scooters, motorcycles, and similarly-powered and based IsoCarro vehicles, as well as refrigerators. It seems that the refrigerator reference is always included in a history of ISO because of its Isetta bubble car and its characteristic single front door.") Because of its egg shape and bubble-like windows, it became known as a bubble car, a name also given to other similar vehicles.

In 1955, the BMW Isetta became the world's first mass-production car to achieve a fuel consumption of 3 L/100 km (94 mpg_{‑imp}; 78 mpg_{‑US}). It was the top-selling single-cylinder car in the world, with 161,728 units sold.

== Iso Isetta (Italy) ==
1953 Iso Isetta
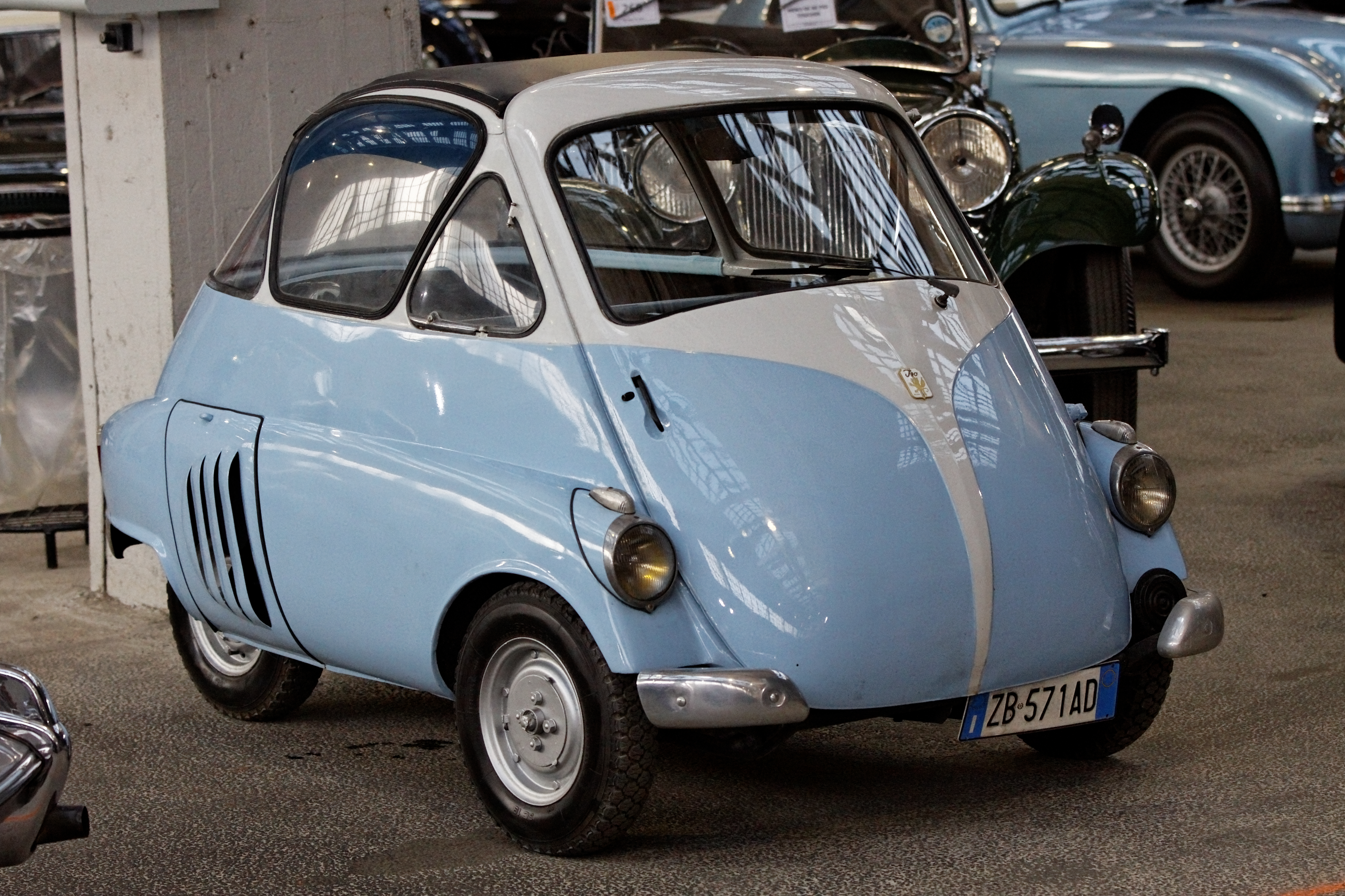

Overview
- Manufacturer: Iso Autoveicoli
- Also called: Iso Autocarro; Isetta Autocarro
- Production: 1953–1956 (Isetta); 1954–1958 (Autocarro)
- Assembly: Italy; Spain
- Designer: Ermenegildo Preti

Body and chassis
- Class: Microcar; 1/2-ton truck
- Body style: Coupé; Pick-up; Van
- Layout: MR layout

Powertrain
- Engine: 236 cc two-stroke twingle
- Transmission: 4-speed manual with reverse, chain drive

Dimensions
- Wheelbase: Autocarro: 2,150 mm (85 in)
- Length: 2,290 mm (90 in); Autocarro: 3,800 mm (150 in)
- Width: 1,370 mm (54 in); 1,400 mm (55 in) (pickup box)
- Curb weight: Autocarro: 475 kg (1,047 lb)

The car originated with the Italian firm of Iso SpA. In the early 1950s the company was building refrigerators, motor scooters and small three-wheeled trucks. Iso's owner, Renzo Rivolta, decided to build a small car for mass distribution. By 1952 the engineers Ermenegildo Preti and Pierluigi Raggi had designed a small car that used the motorcycle engine of the Iso Moto 200 and named it Isetta.

The Isetta caused a sensation when it was introduced to the motoring press in Turin in November 1953. It was unlike anything seen before. Small (only 2.29 m (7.5 ft) long by 1.37 m (4.5 ft) wide) and egg-shaped, with bubble-type windows, the entire front end of the car hinged outwards to allow entry. In the event of an accident, the driver and passenger were to exit through the canvas sunroof. The steering wheel and instrument panel swung out with the single door, simplifying access to the single bench seat. The seat provided reasonable comfort for two occupants, and perhaps a small child. Behind the seat was a large parcel shelf with a spare wheel located below. A heater was optional. Ventilation was provided by turning out the front triangle windows and/or opening the fabric sunroof.

Power came from a 236 cc (14.4 cu in), 7.0 kW (9.5 hp) two-stroke split-single motorcycle engine. The engine was started by a combination generator–starter known as Dynastart. A manual gearbox provided four forward speeds and reverse. A chain drive connected the gearbox to a solid rear axle with a pair of closely spaced 250 mm (9.8 in) rear wheels. The first prototypes had one wheel at the rear, but having a single rear wheel made the car prone to roll-overs, so the rear wheel layout was changed to two wheels set 480 mm (18.9 in) apart from each other. This narrow track eliminated the need for a differential. The front axle was a modified version of a Dubonnet independent front suspension.

The Isetta took over 30 seconds to reach 50 km/h (31 mph) from rest. Top speed was about 75 km/h (47 mph). The fuel tank held 13 litres (3.4 US gal; 2.9 imp gal); the Isetta would get somewhere between 5.6 L/100 km; 42 mpg_{‑US} (50 mpg_{‑imp}) and 4.0 L/100 km; 58 mpg_{‑US} (70 mpg_{‑imp}).

In 1954, Iso entered several Isettas in the legendary Mille Miglia where they took the top three spots in the economy classification. Over a distance of 1,600 km (1,000 mi), the drivers achieved an average speed of over 70 km/h (43 mph).

After its initial success, the Isetta was beginning to slip in popularity at home, mainly due to renewed competition from Fiat with its 500C model.

Renzo Rivolta wanted to concentrate on his new Iso Rivolta sports car, and was interested in doing licensing deals. Plants in Spain and Belgium were already assembling Isettas and Autocarros using Italian-made Iso components. BMW began talking with Rivolta in mid-1954 and bought not just a license but also the complete Isetta body tooling. Rivolta also negotiated licensing deals with companies in France and Brazil.

After some 1,000 units, production of the Italian built cars ceased in 1955. Iso continued to build the Isetta in Spain until 1958.

=== Iso Autocarro ===
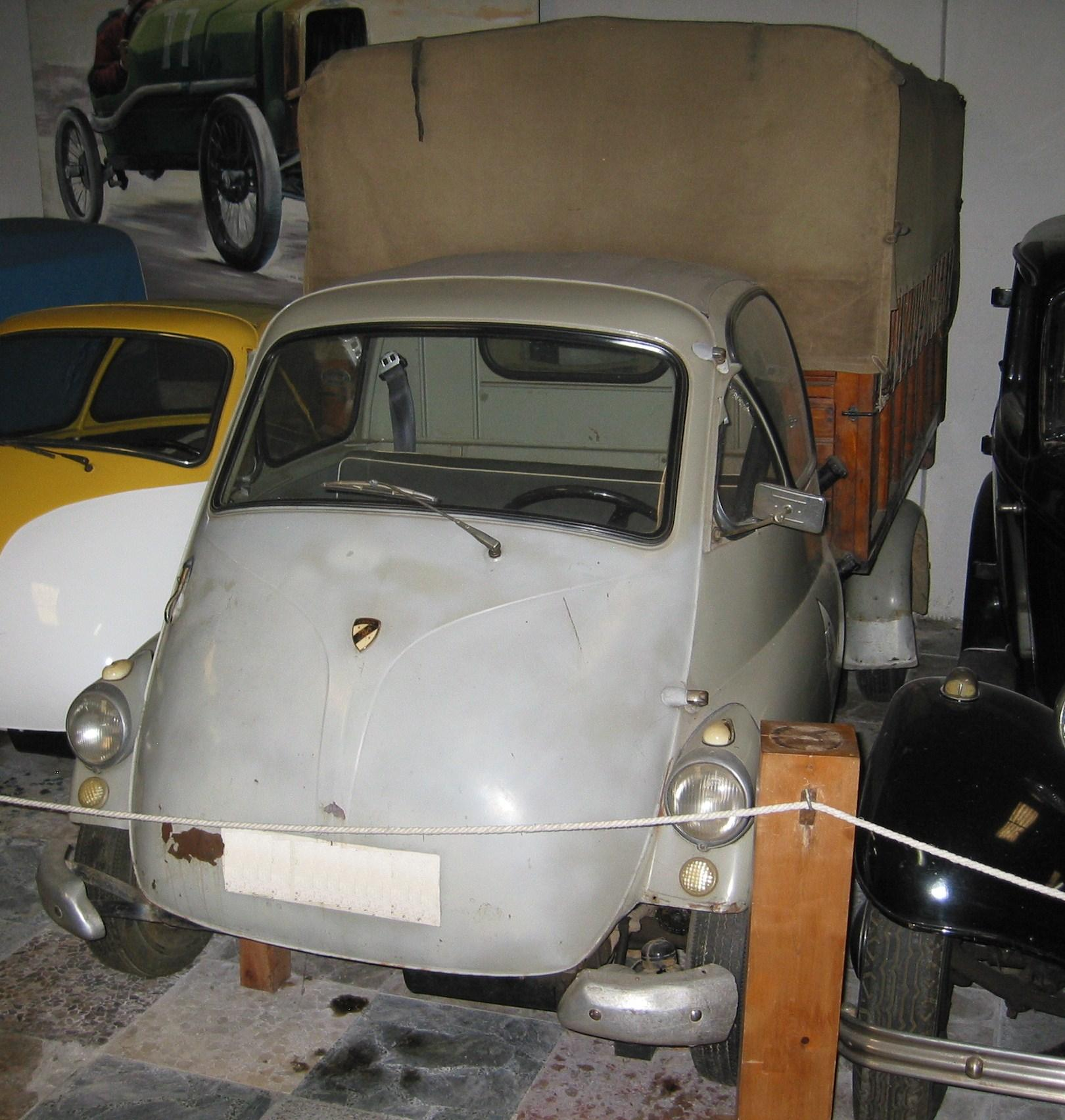
A 1958 Spanish-built Iso Autocarro pick-up truck

In addition to the Iso Isetta vettura described above, Iso also built the Autocarro, a commercial version with full-width rear axle. The Autocarro was offered in several body styles—a flatbed pickup, enclosed truck, a tilt-bed or even a fire engine—although some of these might not have been sold. The Autocarro was very popular in Italy, and many manufacturers produced some variant of the type.

Iso had previously produced a motorcycle-type Isocarro. The Iso Autocarro was larger than most, with its four-wheel layout, conventional rear axle with differential and leaf springs, and a large tubular, ladder-type frame. It could carry a 500 kg (1,100 lb) load. The name Isetta Autocarro was also used. It is thought that more than 4,000 Autocarros were built between 1954 and 1958. The Autocarro was also built in Spain.

== VELAM Isetta (France) ==
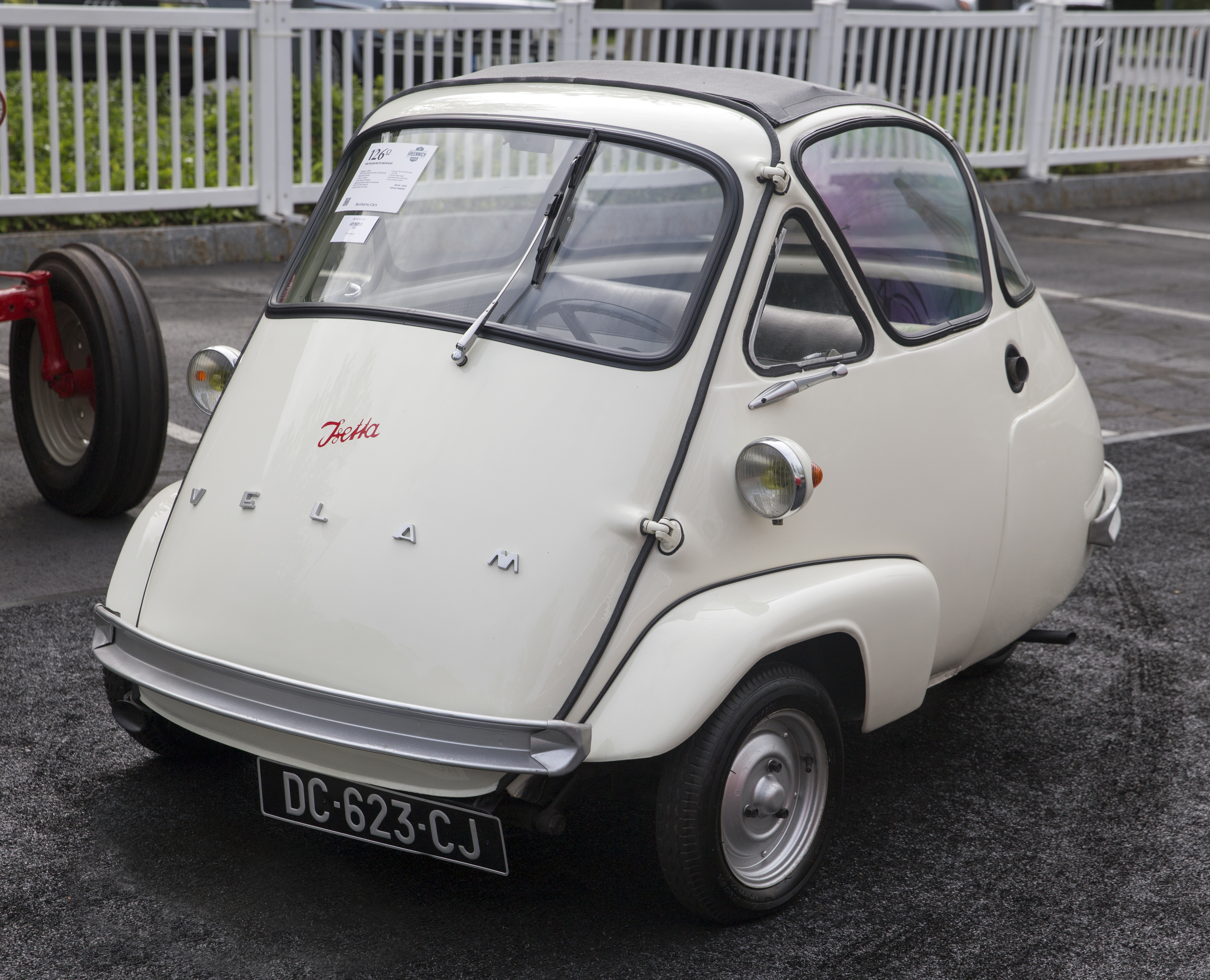
1956 Velam Isetta

In 1954, VELAM acquired a licence from Iso to manufacture a car based on the Isetta. Since Iso had sold the body making equipment to BMW, VELAM developed their own body but used the original Iso engine. The VELAM body was rounder and more egg-like than Iso's Isetta and was known by the French as the 'yogurt pot'. Instead of a chassis like the Italian and German versions, there was a sub-frame bolted to the body at the rear, which held the rear tires, engine, and transmission. The front suspension was bolted to the front of the body. The front door was opened by push button instead of a handle, and the speedometer was mounted in the center of the steering wheel.

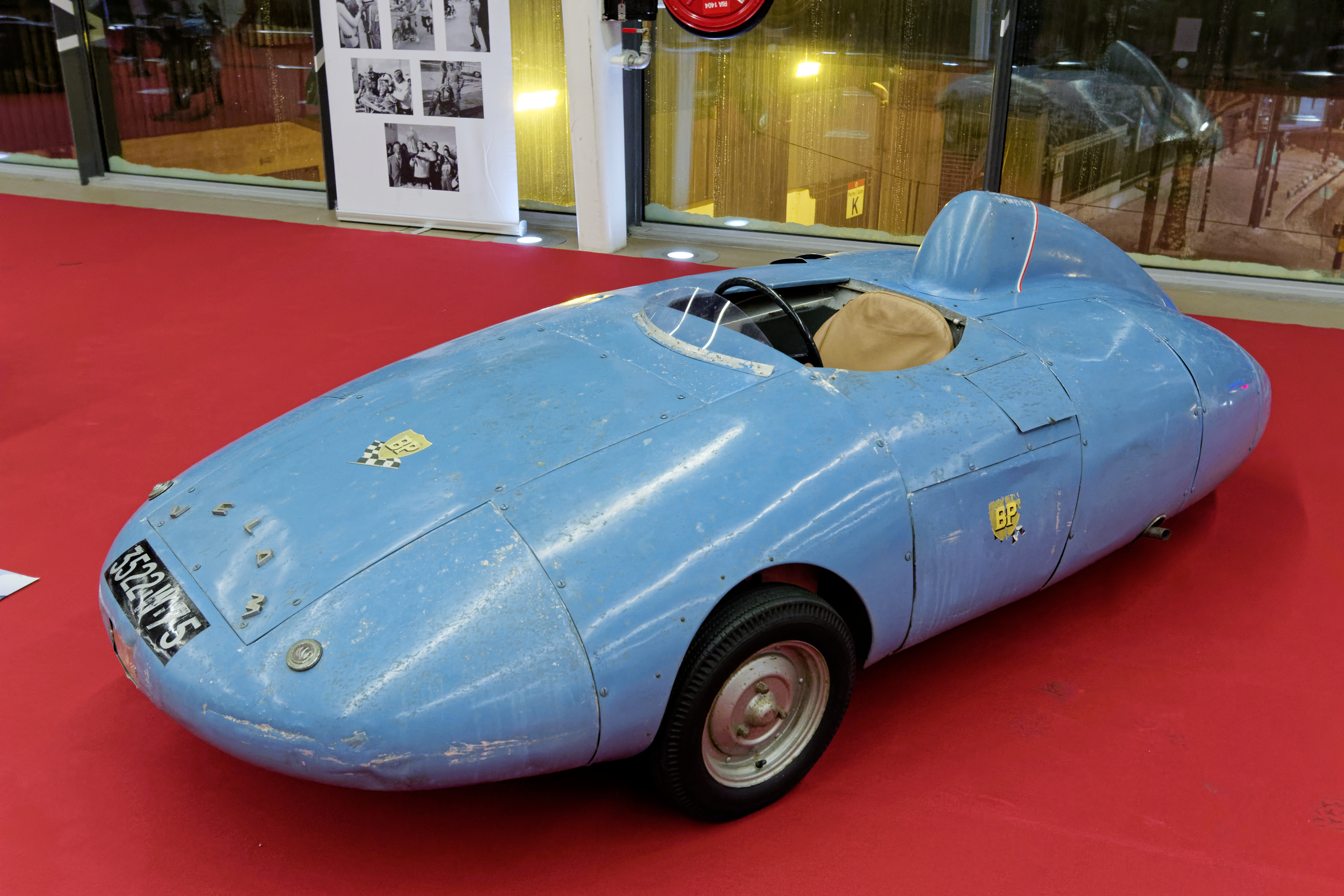
The VELAM Isetta record car from 1957

VELAM started production of the car in June 1955 at the old Talbot factory at Suresnes, France, and the car was introduced at the 1955 Paris Motor Show. All told, five versions of the car were built: the standard Isetta, a convertible version, a luxury version, a one-off "Sport" version, and a record car with a roadster body. The luxury model, called Écrin ("jewel box"), was presented in 1957 and built in 500 examples. In 1957, the streamlined roadster set seven world records for the sub-250 cc class at the Linas-Montlhéry autodrome. Due to competition from the Citroën 2CV and then the Renault Dauphine, production ceased in January 1958.

== De Carlo – Isetta (Argentina) ==
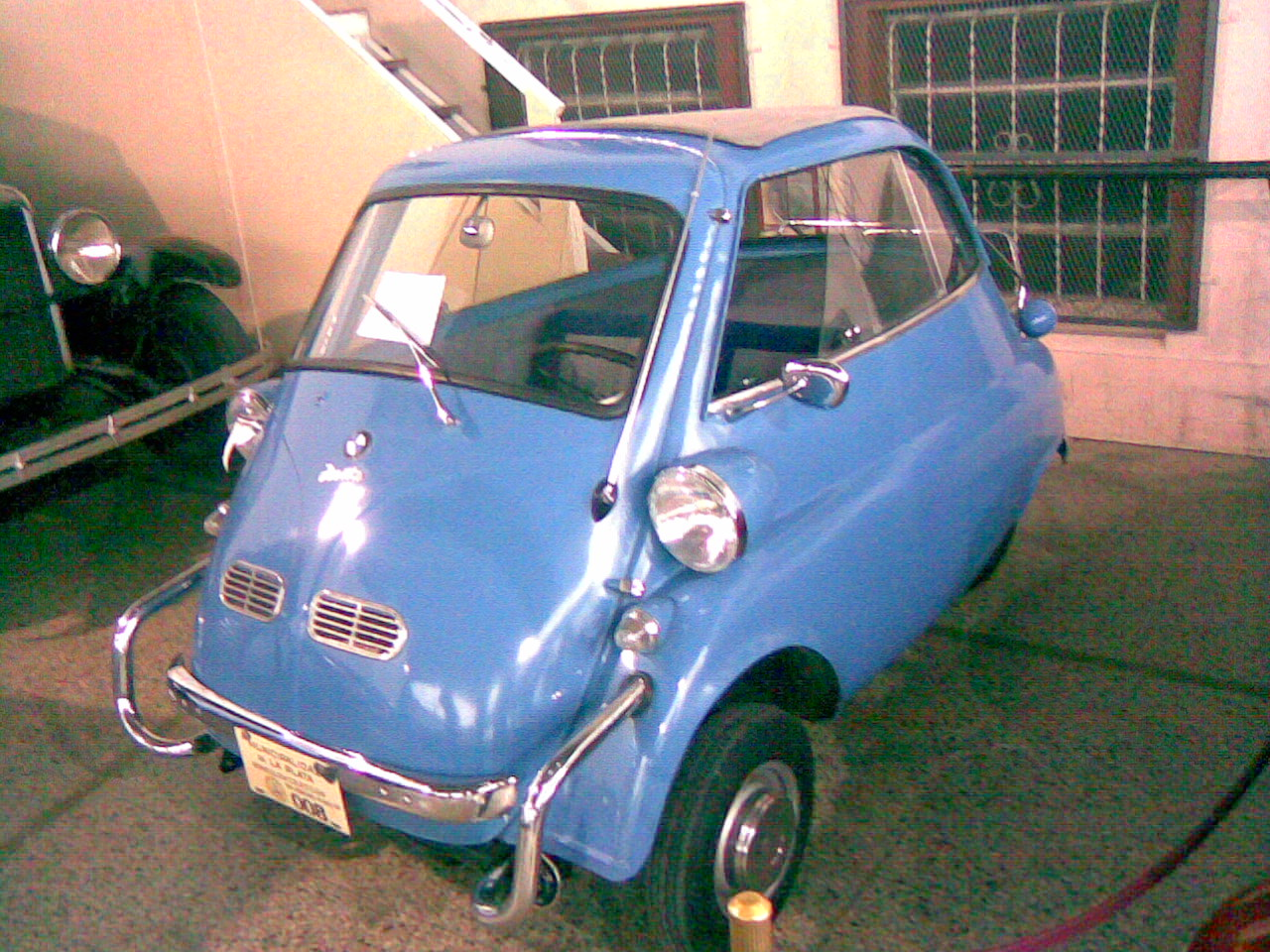
Argentine-made De Carlo – Isetta

The Metalmecánica Company in Buenos Aires commenced automotive manufacturing in 1959, when they started assembling a licensed version of the BMW Isetta. This received a light redesign, with a tiny, two-piece grille being installed on the door. 798 examples were made, but they soon changed over to the BMW 600, which was built in 1,413 examples from 1959 until 1962. Metalmecánica went on to build the BMW 700, which they later redesigned to look similar to the Simca 1000. In 1965, they changed over and began building Simca Arianes under license from the French company SIMCA.

== Romi-Isetta (Brazil) ==
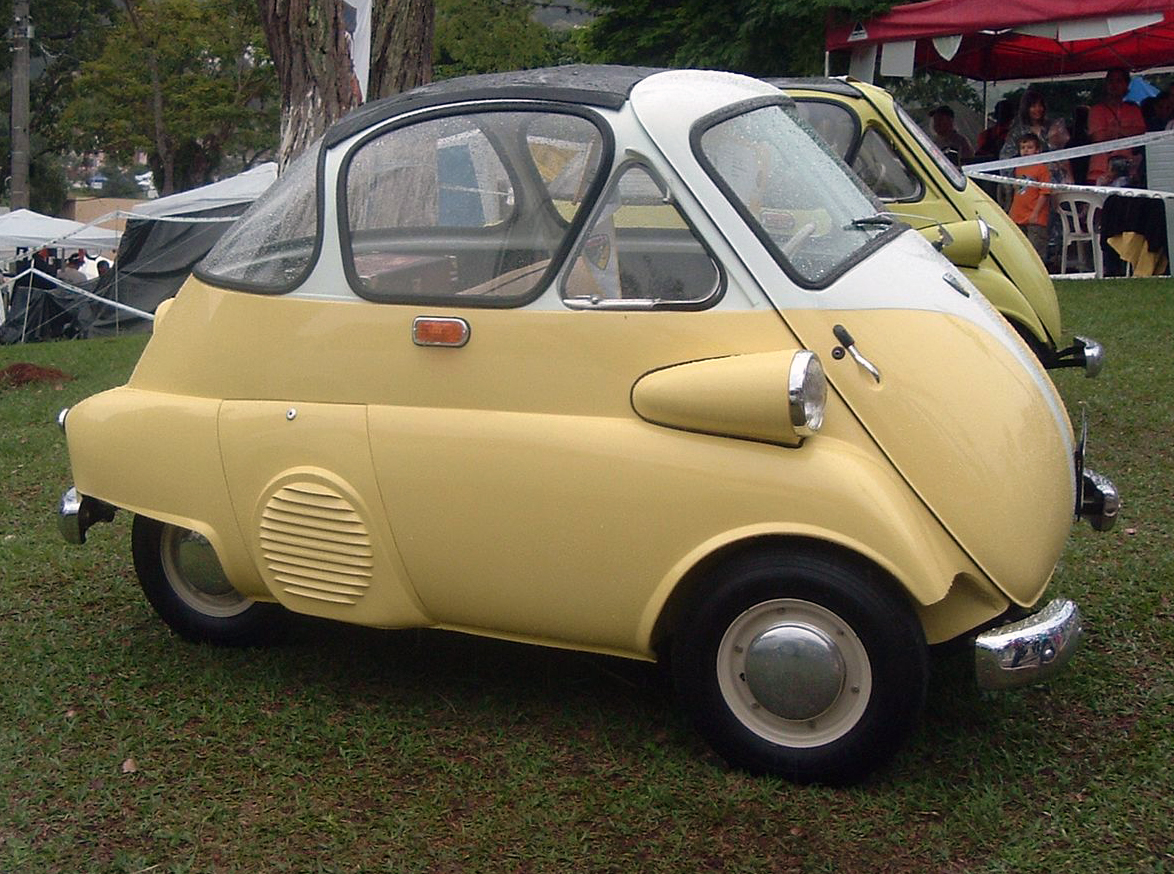
Brazilian-made Romi-Isetta

In 1955, Iso licensed the Isetta to Indústrias Romi S.A., a machine-tool manufacturer headquartered in the city of Santa Bárbara d'Oeste, in the state of São Paulo. The Isetta was chosen, because it was considered an ideal vehicle for use in the cities by virtue of its size and economy. Released on September 5, 1956, it was one of the first cars produced in Brazil, after Ford do Brasil and General Motors do Brasil. The car had received government approval as a part of a state-supported drive to establish an automotive industry in Brazil, but ended up being built without government backing.

Some 3,000 of the Romi-Isettas were manufactured from 1956 to 1961. They kept the Iso design and used Iso engines until 1958, in 1959 they switched to the BMW 300 cc engines.

== BMW Isetta (West Germany) ==
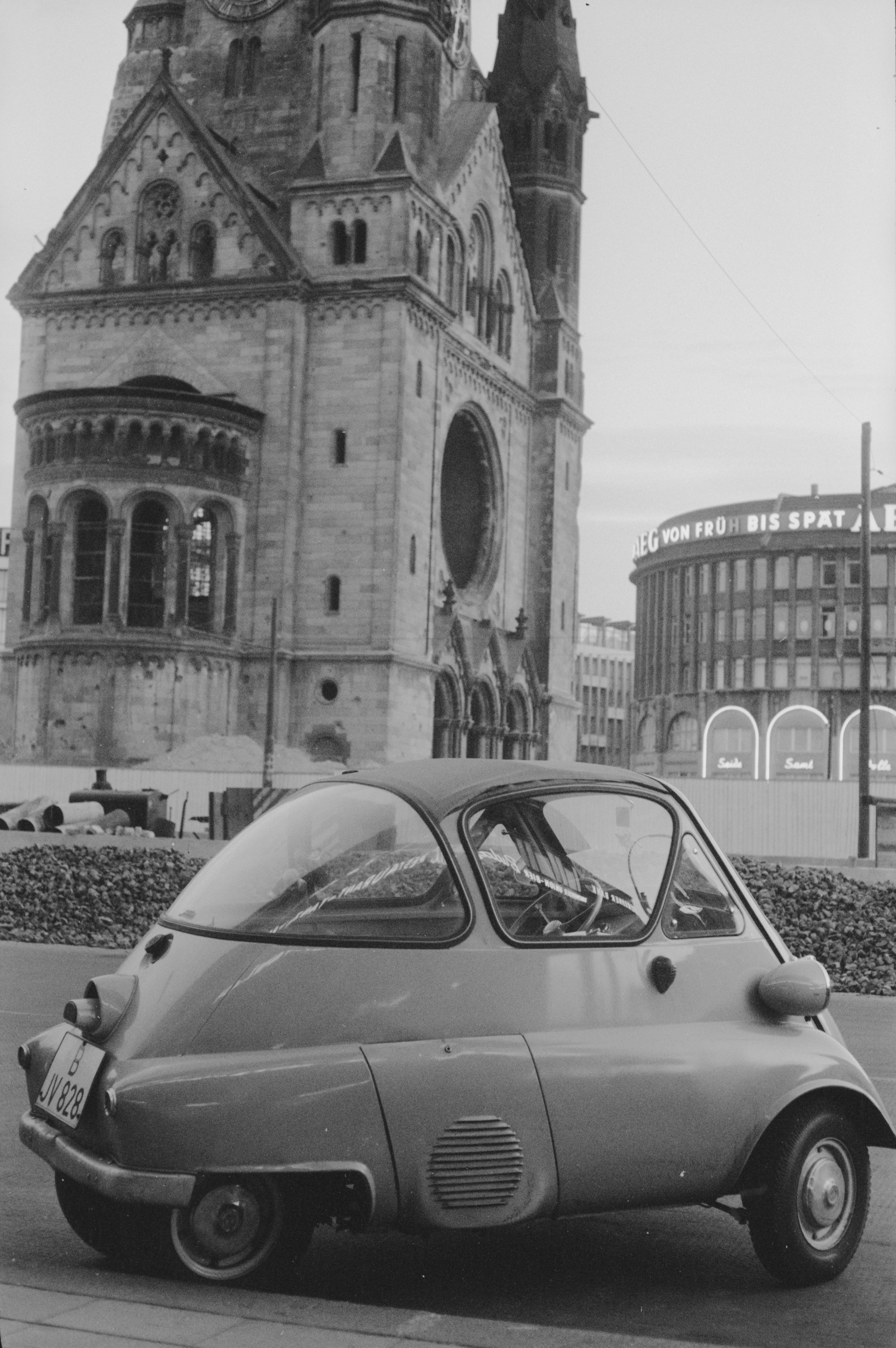
An Isetta 250 parked near the Kaiser Wilhelm Memorial Church in West Berlin

The BMW Isetta differed widely from the Iso model. While the major elements of the Italian design remained intact, BMW re-engineered much of the car – so much so that none of the parts between a BMW Isetta Moto Coupe and an Iso Isetta are interchangeable. BMW changed the powerplant to a one-cylinder, four-stroke, 247 cc motorcycle engine of their own manufacture which generated 12 PS (8.8 kW).

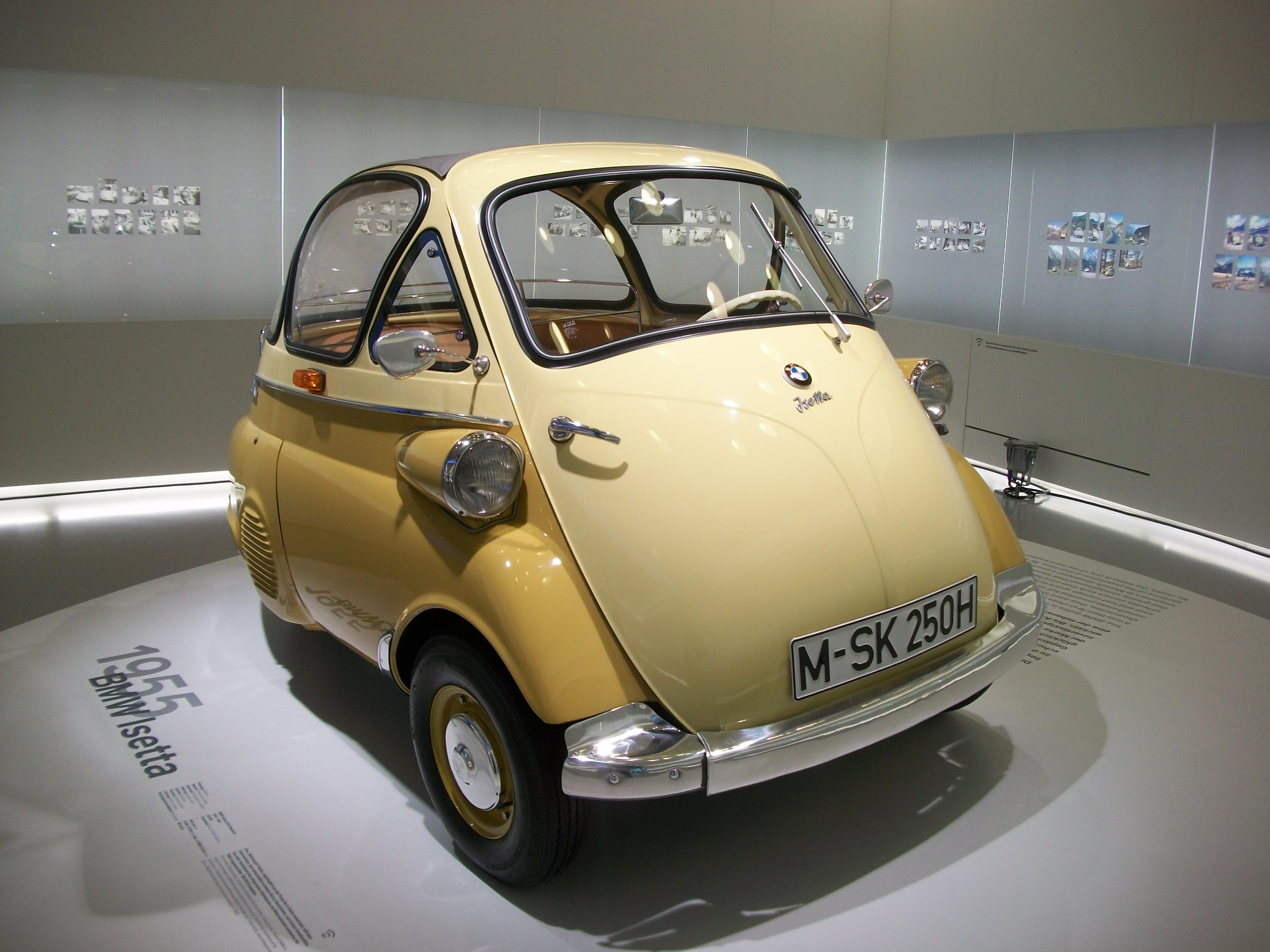
1955 BMW Isetta 250, BMW Museum, Munich, Germany

The first BMW Isetta appeared in April 1955. In May 1962, three years after launching the conventionally modern-looking BMW 700, BMW ceased production of Isettas. A total of 161,728 units had been built.

In the 1990s, the BMW Isetta had garnered a resurgence through the television show Family Matters, in which one of the main characters, Steve Urkel (Jaleel White), drives a 1960 BMW Isetta.

=== BMW Isetta 250 ===
While it retained the "bubble window" styling, it differed from the Italian model in that its headlamps were fixed separately to the sides of the bodywork and it carried the BMW badge below the windscreen. The car was also redesigned to take a modified version of the 250 cc four-stroke engine from the BMW R25/3 motorcycle and the front suspension was changed. The single-cylinder generated 12 PS (8.8 kW) at 5800 rpm. The crankcase and cylinder were made of cast iron, the cylinder head of aluminium alloy. The head was rotated by 180° compared with the motorcycle engine. The twin-bearing crankshaft was also different in the Isetta motor, being larger and featuring reinforced bearings. One of the reasons for this was the heavy Dynastart unit, a combined dynamo and starter-motor. The fuel mixture was provided by a Bing sliding throttle side draft motorcycle carburetor. In addition to further changes of detail, the BMW engineers enlarged the sump for installation in the car and cooled the engine by means of a radial fan and shrouded ducting.

The power train from the four-speed gearbox to the two rear wheels was also unusual: fixed to the gearbox output drive was something called a Hardy disc, which was a cardan joint made of rubber. On the other side of it was a cardan shaft, and finally a second Hardy disc, which in turn was located at the entrance to a chain case. A duplex chain running in an oil bath finally led to a rigid shaft, with the two rear wheels at each end. Thanks to this elaborate power transfer, the engine–gearbox unit was free of tension in its linkage to the rear axle and well soundproofed.

In West Germany, the Isetta could be driven with a motorcycle license. The top speed of the Isetta 250 was rated as 85 km/h (53 mph).

The first BMW Isetta rolled off the line in April 1955, and in the next eight months some 10,000 were produced.

=== BMW Isetta 300 ===
BMW 300 (Isetta)
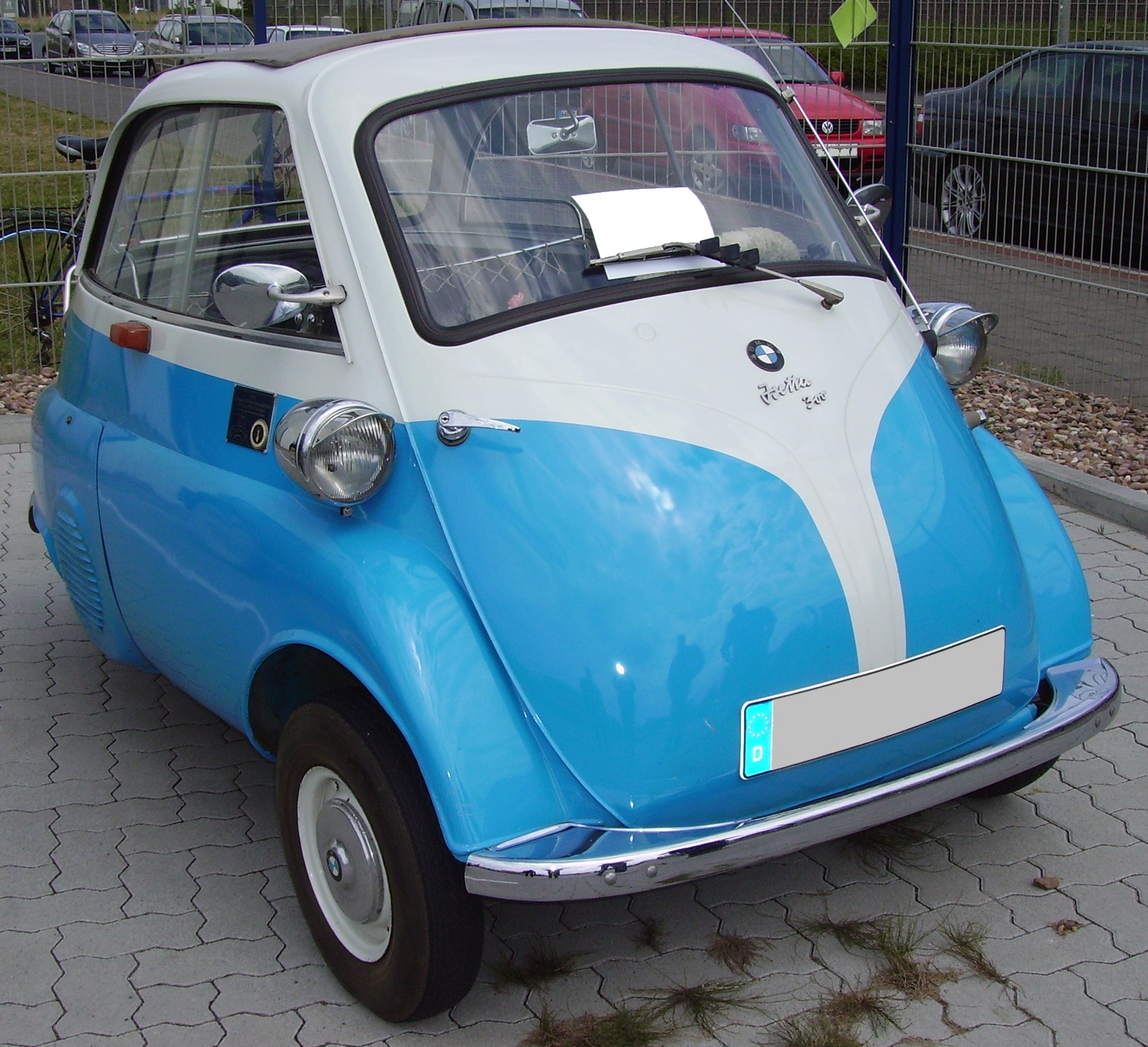

Overview
- Manufacturer: BMW
- Also called: BMW Isetta
- Production: 1956–62; 161,360 produced

Body and chassis
- Class: quadricycle microcar
- Layout: RR layout

Powertrain
- Engine: 298 cc single-cylinder 4-stroke (53 mph (85 km/h) top speed)
- Transmission: 4-speed manual (with reverse)

Dimensions
- Length: 88.6 inches
- Width: 52.8 inches
- Curb weight: 353 kg (778 lb)

Chronology
- Predecessor: BMW 250
- Successor: BMW 600

In 1956, the government of the Federal Republic of Germany changed the regulations for motor vehicles. Class IV licences issued from that time onward could be used only to operate small motorcycles and could no longer be used to operate motor vehicles with a capacity of less than 250 cc. At the same time tax classes were restructured, with one category limit set at 300 cc. Class IV licences issued before the change in the regulations were grandfathered and allowed to be used as before. This change in regulations encouraged BMW to revise the Isetta: In February 1956 a 300cc engine was introduced. The engineers enlarged the single cylinder to a 72 mm (2.8 in) bore and 73 mm (2.9 in) stroke, which gave a displacement of approximately 297 cc; at the same time, they raised the compression ratio from 6.8 to 7.0:1. As a result, the engine power output rose to 13 PS (9.6 kW) at 5200 rpm, and the torque rose to 18.4 N⋅m (13.6 ft⋅lbf) at 4600 rpm. The maximum speed remained at 85 km/h (53 mph), yet there was a marked increase in flexibility, chiefly noticeable on gradients.

In October 1956, the Isetta Moto Coupé DeLuxe (sliding-window Isetta) was introduced. The bubble windows were replaced by longer, sliding side windows.

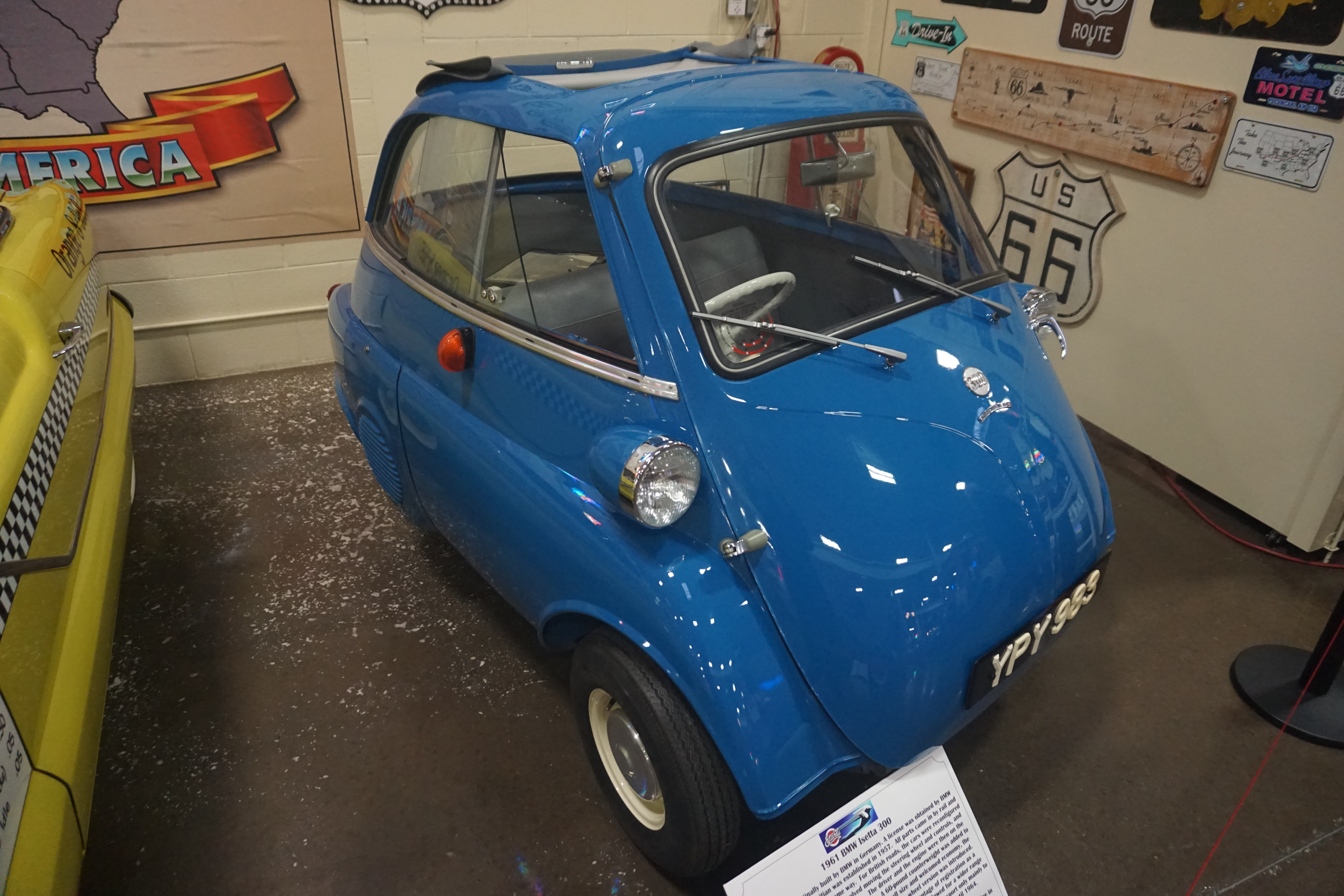
1961 BMW Isetta 300 at Stahls Automotive Collection

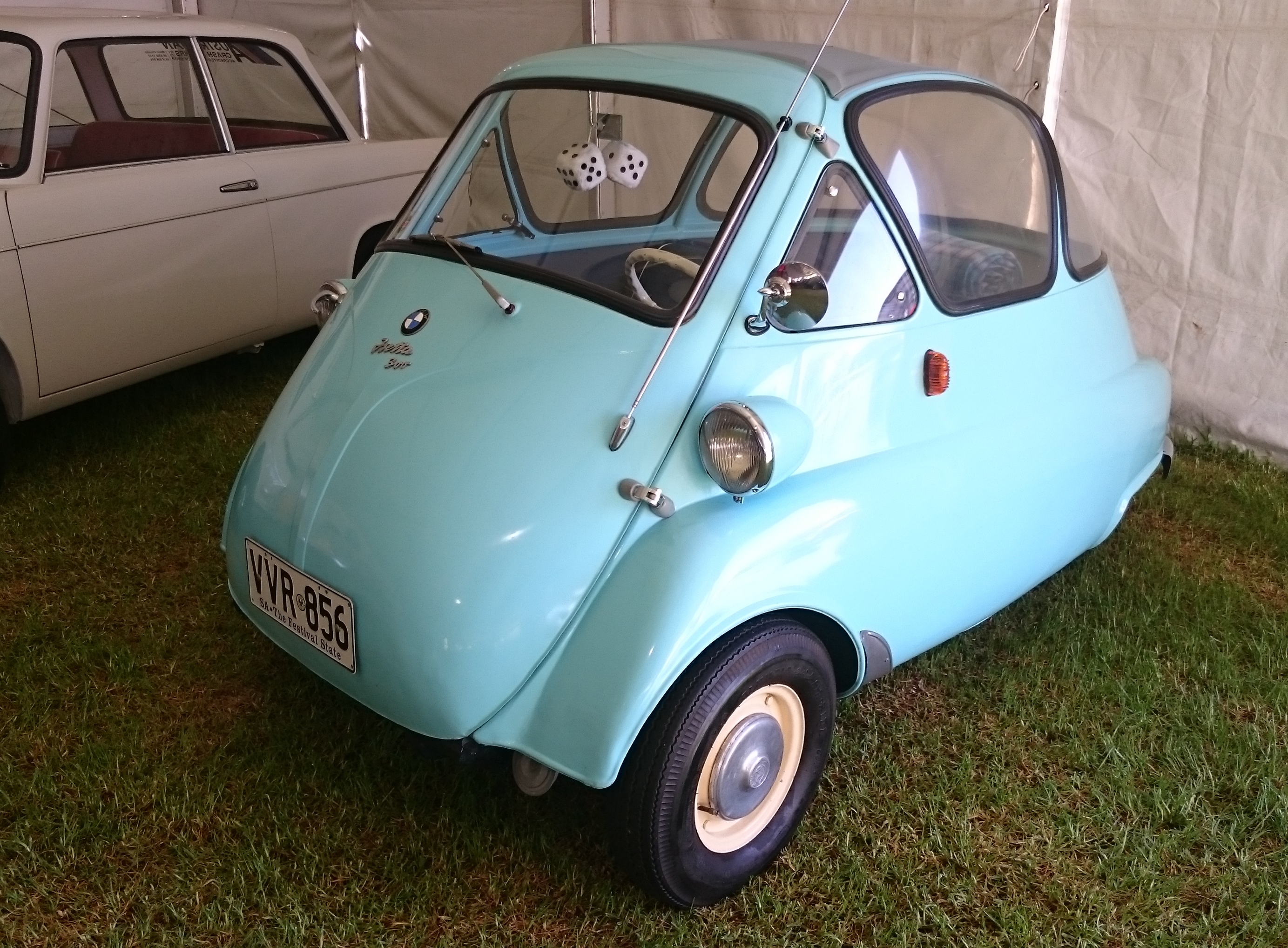
BMW Isetta 300. This example has the early bubble window body.

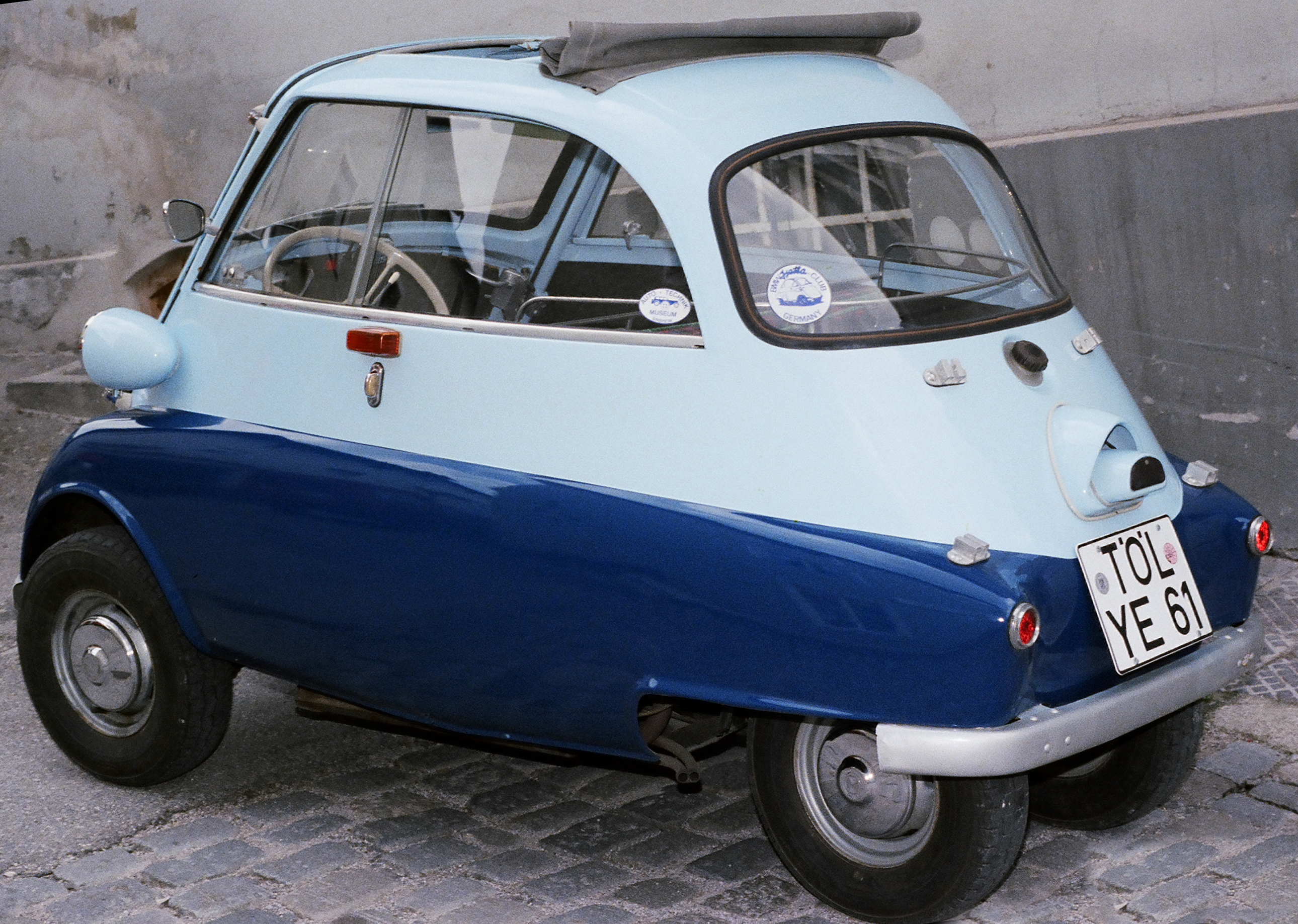
BMW Isetta 300 – sliding-window four-wheel LHD version

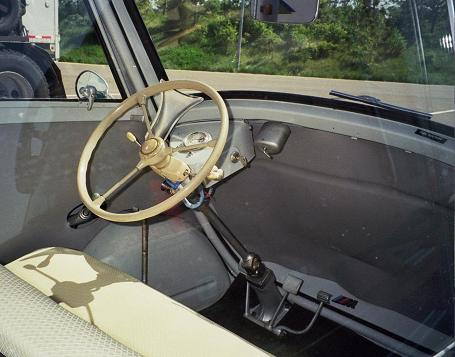
BMW Isetta 300 interior

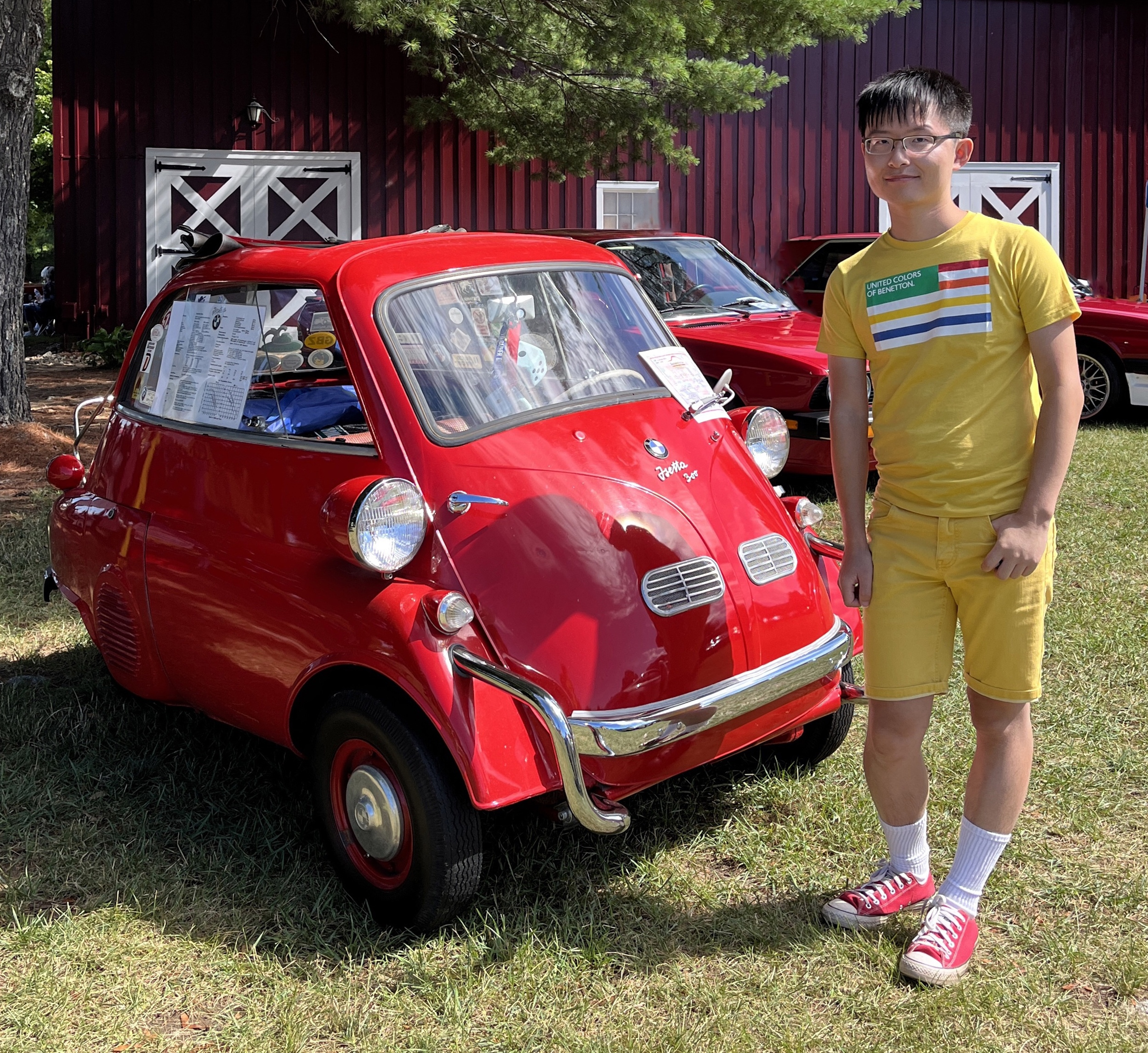
BMW Isetta 300, next to a 167-centimetre (5 ft 6 in) young man

=== BMW 600 ===
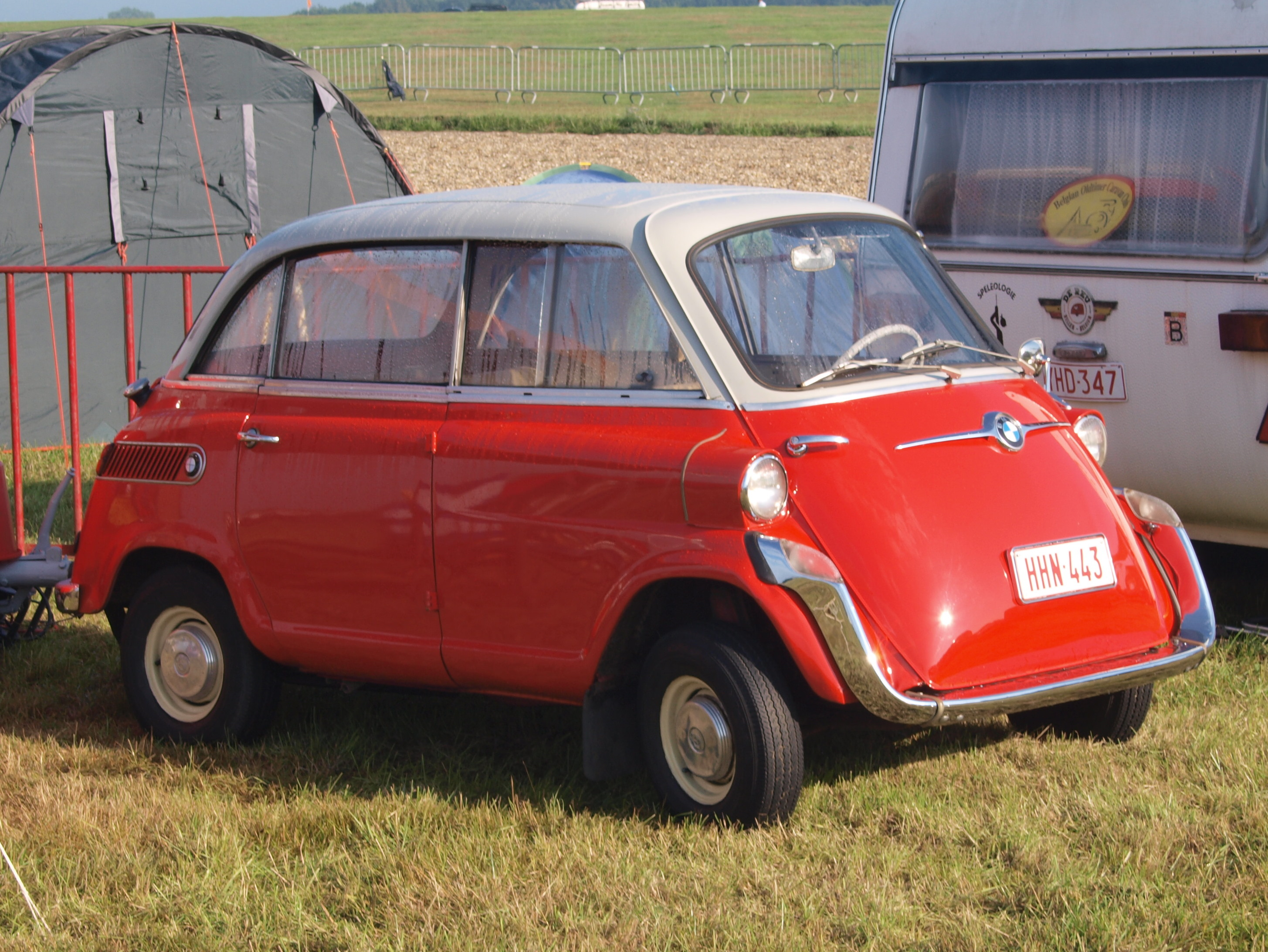
BMW 600, the largest BMW bubble car

The BMW 600 was intended as an enlarged Isetta with more power and a more conventional four-wheel configuration.

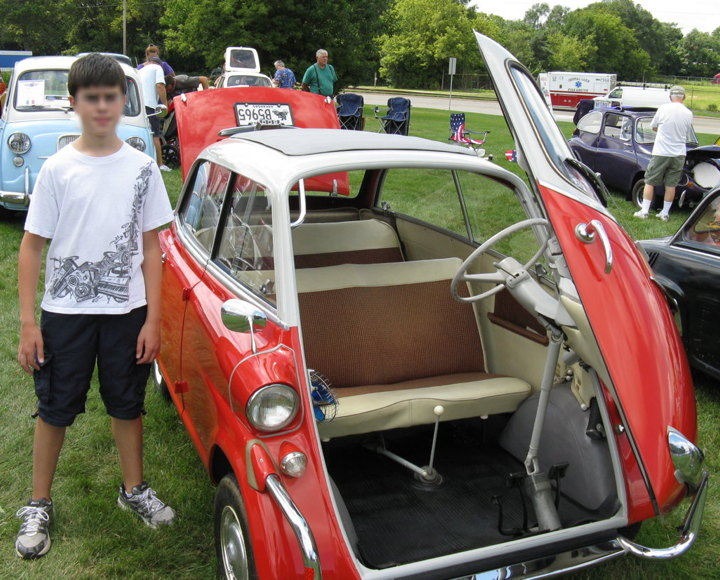
BMW Isetta 600, showing hinged steering wheel, next to 160 cm (5 ft 3 in) boy

The front end of the 600 was virtually unchanged, but the 600's wheelbase was stretched to accommodate four seats. A conventional rear axle was added. BMW introduced the semi-trailing arm independent suspension on the 600. This suspension would be used on almost every new model for the next four decades. To deal with the increased size and weight, the 600 was fitted with the 582 cc boxer engine from the R67 motorcycle. Top speed was 103 km/h (64 mph).

In the two years that the model was in production, 34,000 600s were made. In its price segment it was in competition with the entry-level VW Beetle. In the late 1950s, consumers wanted cars that looked like cars, and they had lost interest in economy models. Sales of the 600 were, however, aided by the energy crisis of 1956–1957.

== BMW Isetta (United Kingdom) ==
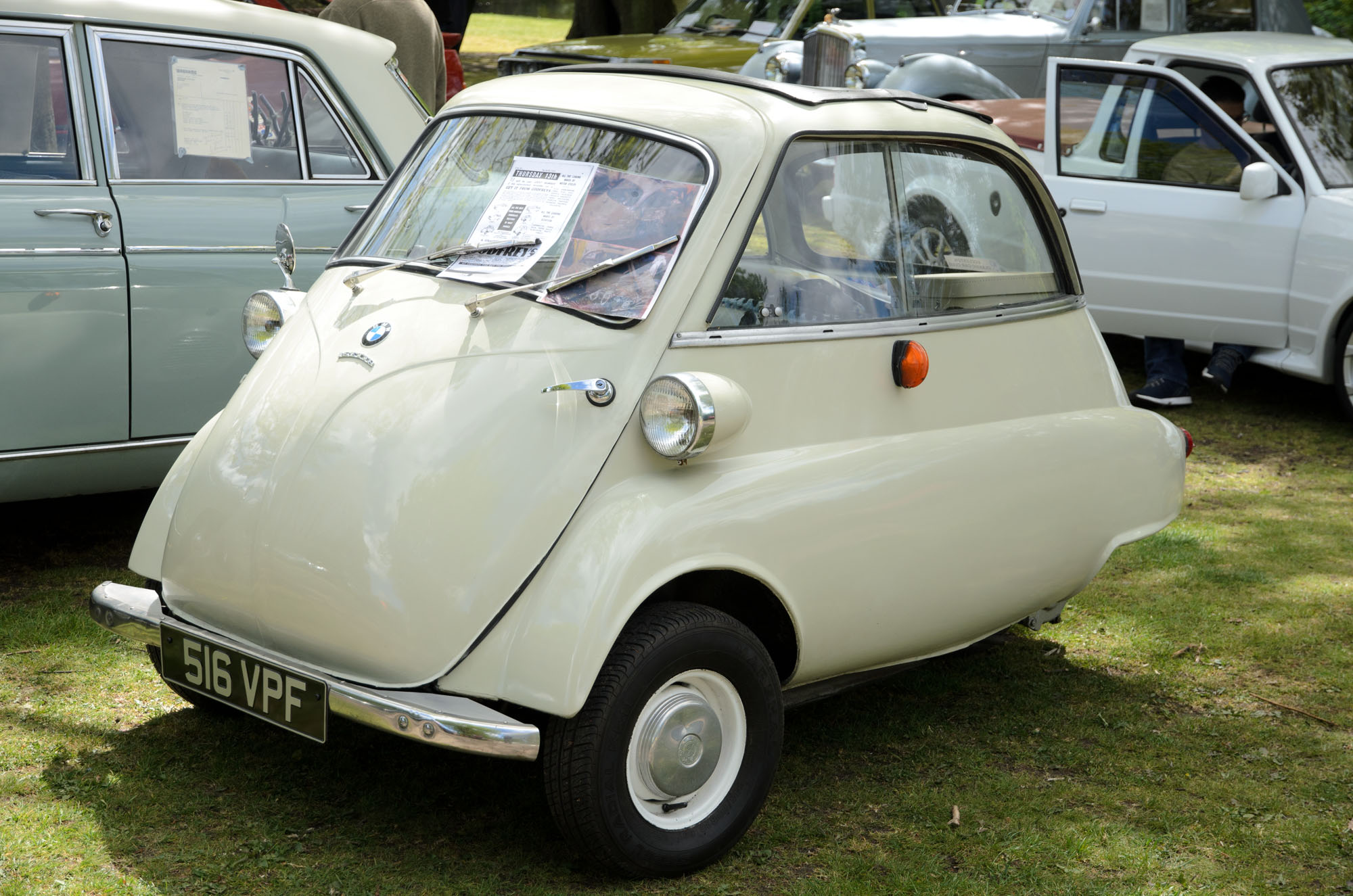
British-registered RHD three-wheeled Isetta

In March 1957, Dunsfold Tools Ltd. signed a lease on part of the former Brighton railway works on the south coast of England with the intention of beginning production of the BMW Isetta under licence in May of that year. Shortly afterwards, Dunsfold Tools Ltd was renamed Isetta of Great Britain and the British Isetta was officially launched at the Dorchester hotel in April. The factory had no access by road, therefore components were delivered by rail and finished cars were shipped out the same way.

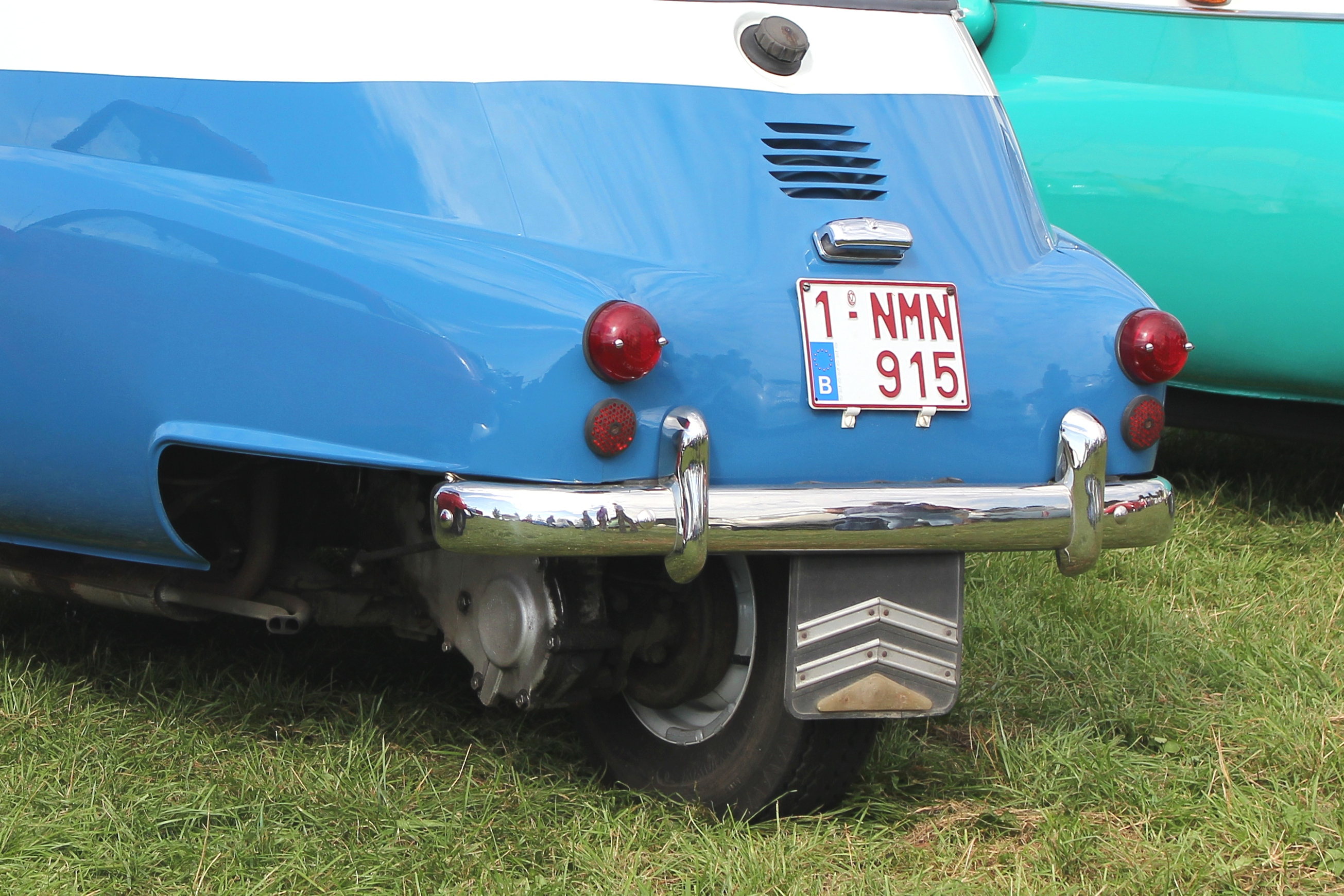
Three-wheel BMW Isetta

The British cars had right-hand drive with the door hinged from the right hand side of the car and the steering column moved across to the right as well. Right-hand drive meant that both the driver and the engine were on the same side, so a 27 kg (60 lb) counterweight was added to the left side to compensate. Dunlop tyres were used, and Lucas electrics replaced the German Hella and Bosch components, with a different headlamp housing being used. Girling brake components replaced the ATE brake parts.

The Isetta was not popular in the UK until a three-wheeled version was introduced. Although three-wheeled vehicles offer a less stable ride, in the UK there was the advantage of being classed as three-wheeled motorcycles, which meant a lower tax class, and the requirement of only a motorcycle driving licence. Isetta of Great Britain also continued to produce four-wheeled Isettas, but only for export to Canada, New Zealand, and Australia.

In 1962, Isetta of Great Britain stopped production of the cars. Isetta engines were produced until 1964.

== Modern successors ==
=== Isetta replica kits ===
The now defunct British firm Tri-Tech, under the model name Zetta, sold a kit car or even an assembled complete BMW Isetta lookalike replica from modern parts, including Honda CN 250 cc single-cylinder water-cooled engines with automatic transmission (standard) or Kawasaki 500 GPS two-cylinder water-cooled motorcycle engines with optional manual transmission.

Some parts, new or used, were from donor vehicles. Front suspension and steering were from the Suzuki Super Carry/Bedford Rascal (later Vauxhall Rascal). Drum brakes and wheels were from Morris and the subsequent British Leyland Motor Corporation Mini. Prices ranged from c. £2650 for the kit up to c. £9450 for a complete version.

It could be legally registered for use under British laws. Tri-Tech also supplied some body parts which can be used for running non-exact restorations of BMW Isettas.

=== Possible BMW reintroduction ===
In 2009, Auto Express reported that BMW had partnered with the University of Bath in order to develop a series of three- and four-wheeled, rear-engine, rear-wheel-drive city cars. This led to speculation that the Isetta badge would be returning as a competitor to small cars such as the Toyota iQ. Following this, during the development of the Megacity / BMW i brand, rumours and reports suggested that one of the upcoming cars would be named the 'iSetta', taking its name and inspiration from the classic BMW Isetta. No such car was produced, although the i brand was subsequently launched with the BMW i3 and BMW i8.

=== Durax D-Face ===
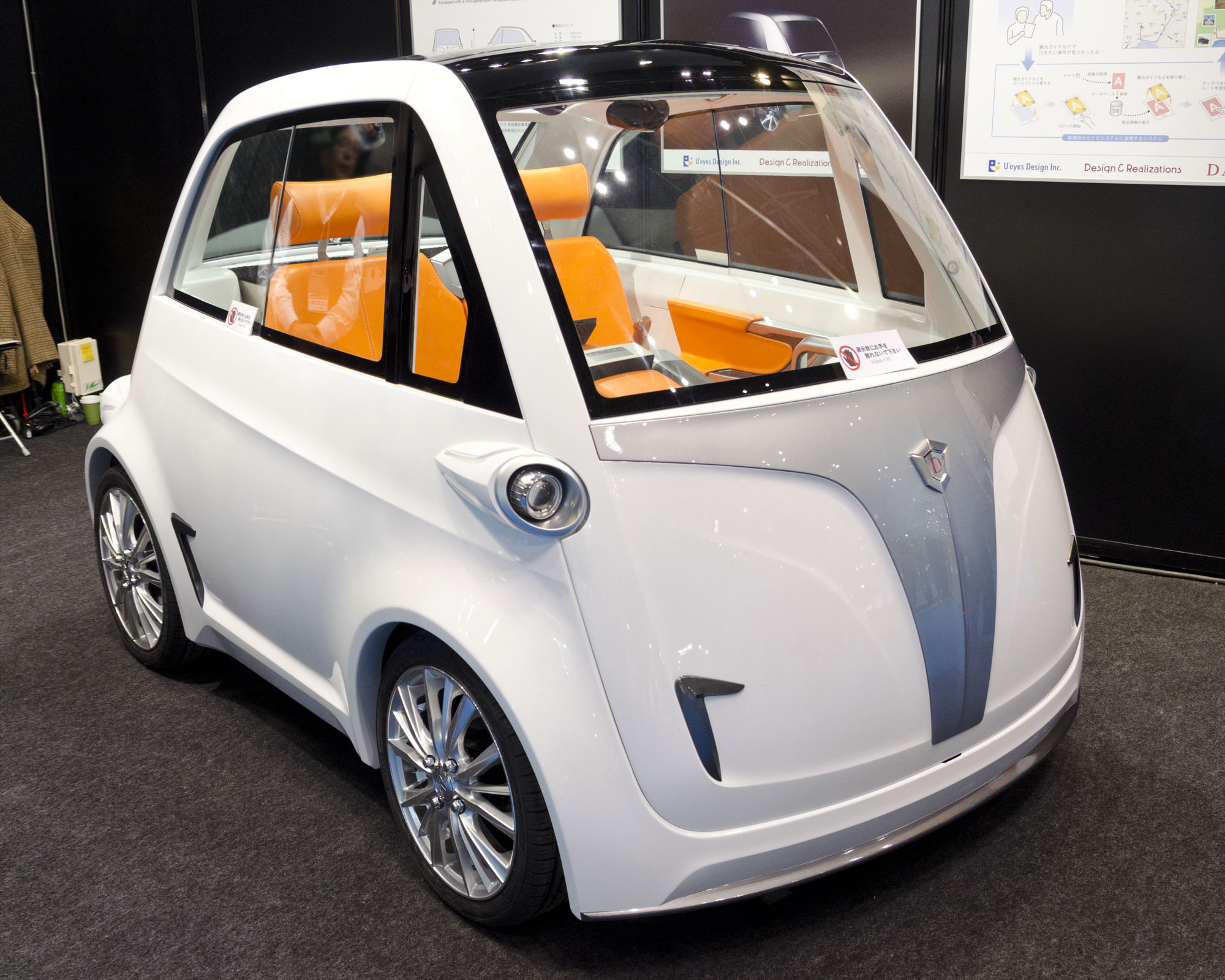
Durax D-Face at the 2013 Tokyo Motor Show

At the 2013 Tokyo Motor Show, Gifu based company D Art revealed the Durax D-Face, a front entry, rear engine bubble car taking inspiration from the Isetta. The microcar was powered by a 7 kW electric motor coupled with a 3 kW petrol generator, giving a range of around 190 miles. A top speed of around 45 mph likely limited the car to city driving.

=== Microlino ===
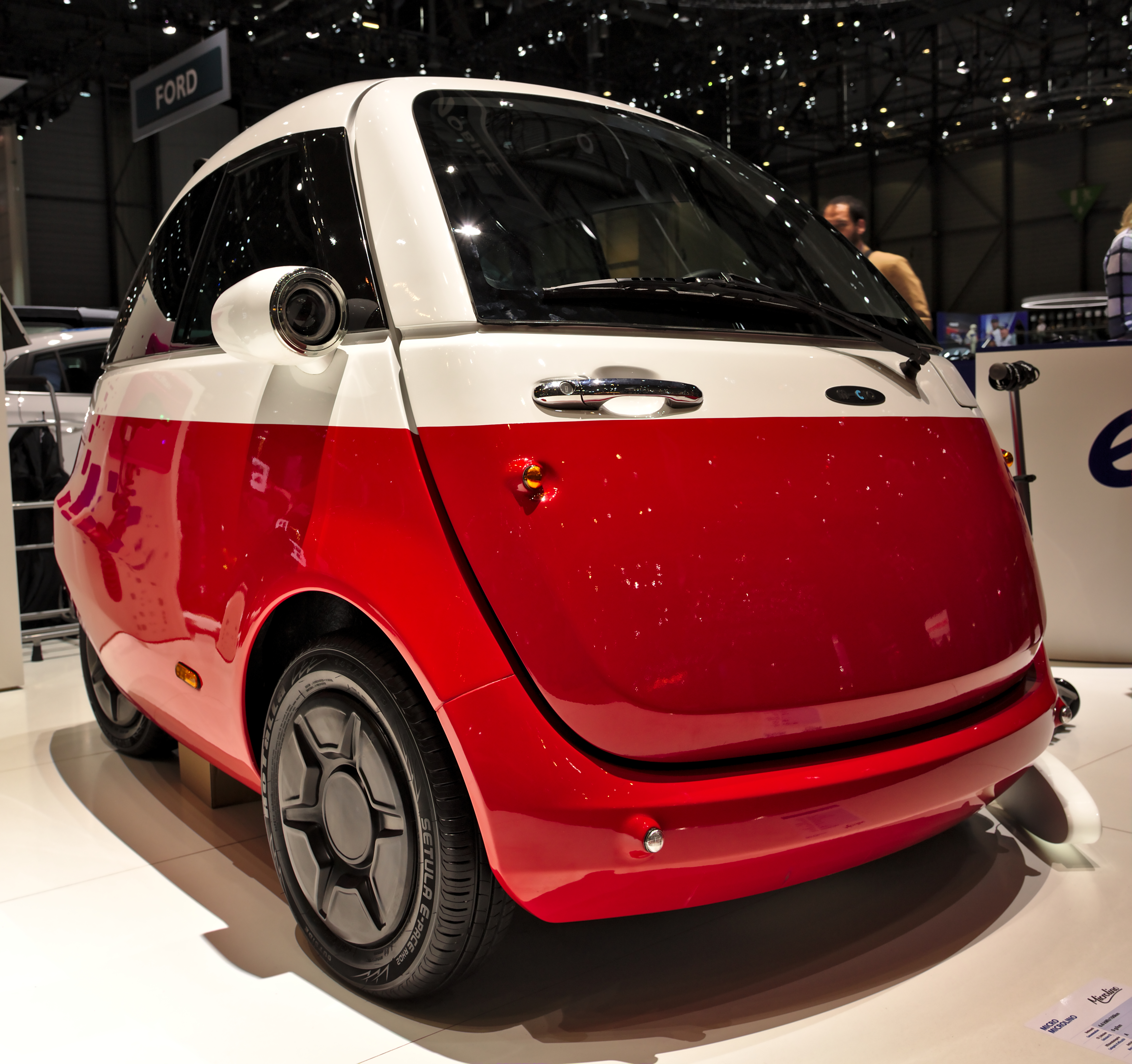
Microlino at the 2018 Geneva Motor Show

At the 2016 Geneva Motor Show, Swiss entrepreneur Wim Ouboter of Micro Mobility Systems revealed the Microlino, a small electric microcar inspired by the Isetta. After being postponed, production of the vehicle commenced in 2022 with pre-orders for over 8,000 vehicles, costing EUR 12,000 each.

=== Suzhou Eagle EG6330K ===
In 2018, Chinese company Suzhou Eagle revealed the Eagle EG6330K, a low speed electric vehicle styled after the BMW Isetta and BMW 600. Primarily aimed at young people living in large cities, the car featured a 72 kWh lead acid battery giving a top speed of around 40 mph and a range of around 75 miles.

=== Artega Karo / Electric Brands Evetta ===
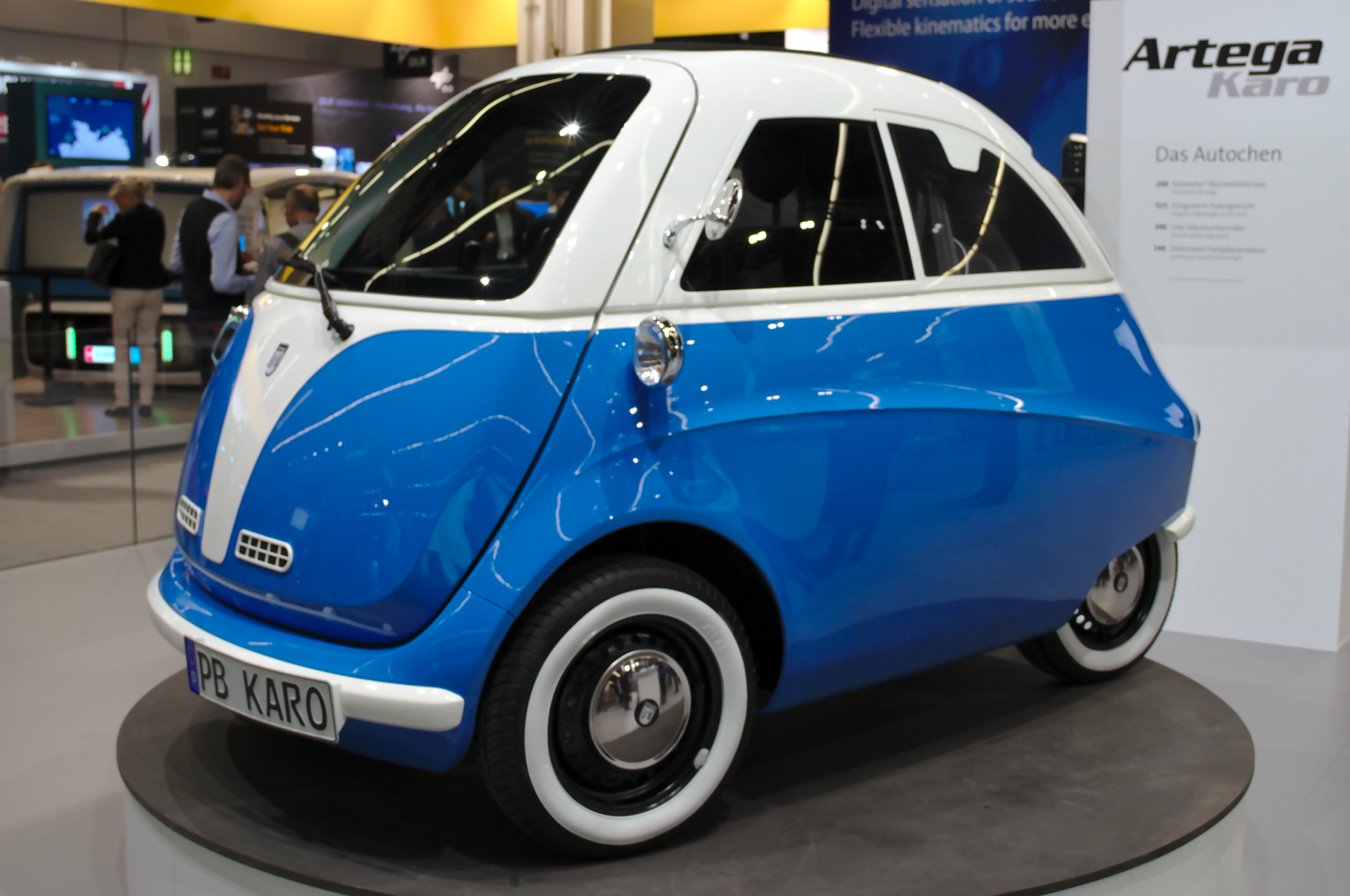
Artega Karo at the 2019 IAA

In 2019, German company Artega presented the Isetta-inspired Karo at the International Motor Show Germany. In 2022 Artega was acquired by German company Electric Brands. The Karo was renamed the Evetta, with plans to build commercial and non commercial versions, starting just under 20,000 EUR.

== See also ==
- Commuter Cars Tango – Ultra narrow electric sports car
- Evetta – German electric microcar
- Heinkel Kabine
- List of microcars by country of origin – World's smallest automobiles
- Messerschmitt Kabinenroller
- Microlino – Battery electric microcar
- Paul Arzens – French industrial designer (1903–1990), "L'oeuf"
- Peel P50 – Three-wheeled automobile
- Peel Trident – Three-wheeled automobile
- Zündapp Janus – Car model
