= Microlino =

Battery electric microcar

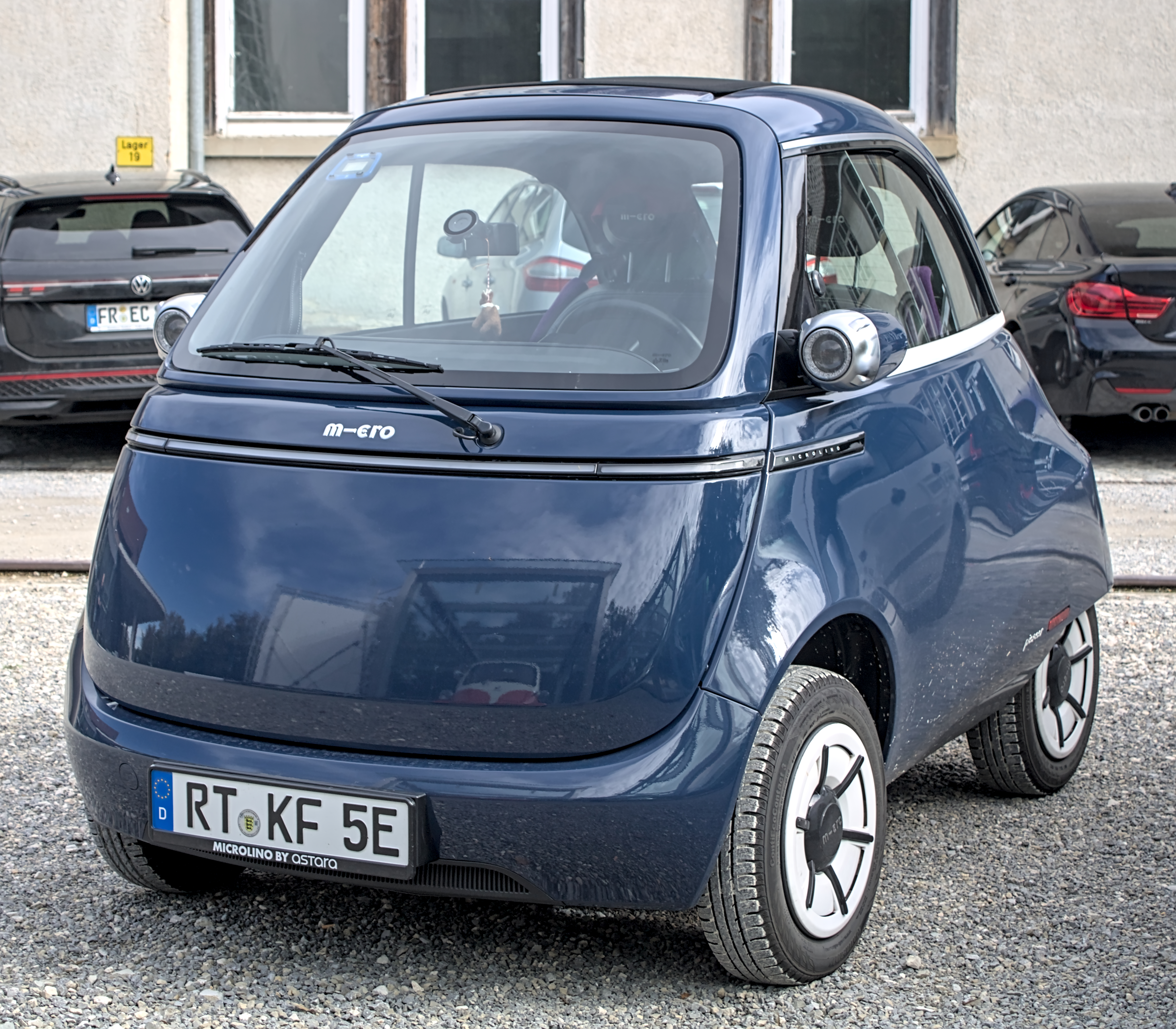
- Microlino 2.0 in Metzingen, Germany, in 2024

Overview
- Manufacturer: Micro Mobility Systems
- Production: 2022–present
- Assembly: Italy: Turin (Cecomp)
- Designer: Icona

Body and chassis
- Class: Quadricycle (L7e & L6e)
- Layout: Rear-motor, rear-wheel-drive

Powertrain
- Electric motor: 12.5 kW
- Battery: 5.5–15.0 kWh
- Range: 93–228 km

Dimensions
- Length: 2,519 mm (99.2 in)
- Width: 1,473 mm (58.0 in)
- Height: 1,501 mm (59.1 in)
- Kerb weight: 496–530 kg (1,093–1,168 lb)

The Microlino is a four-wheeled, battery electric bubble car manufactured by the company Micro since its introduction in 2022. The microcar is available in two versions as either a light or a heavy quadricycle, with the latter having a top speed of 90 km/h.

The Microlino is equipped with a trunk, a sunroof, a front-opening door, and externally mounted headlights. It can be charged with either a household plug or a Type 2 connector with no fast charging capability. As a microcar, it contains aspects of a car and motorcycle, and has 50% fewer parts than a typical automobile and its environmental footprint is up to 60% lower than that of a conventional electric vehicle.

The Microlino holds the leading position in Switzerland as the most registered vehicle in the L7e category. In 2024, Microlino introduced a fixed-profile convertible variant, the Microlino Spiaggina.

== History ==
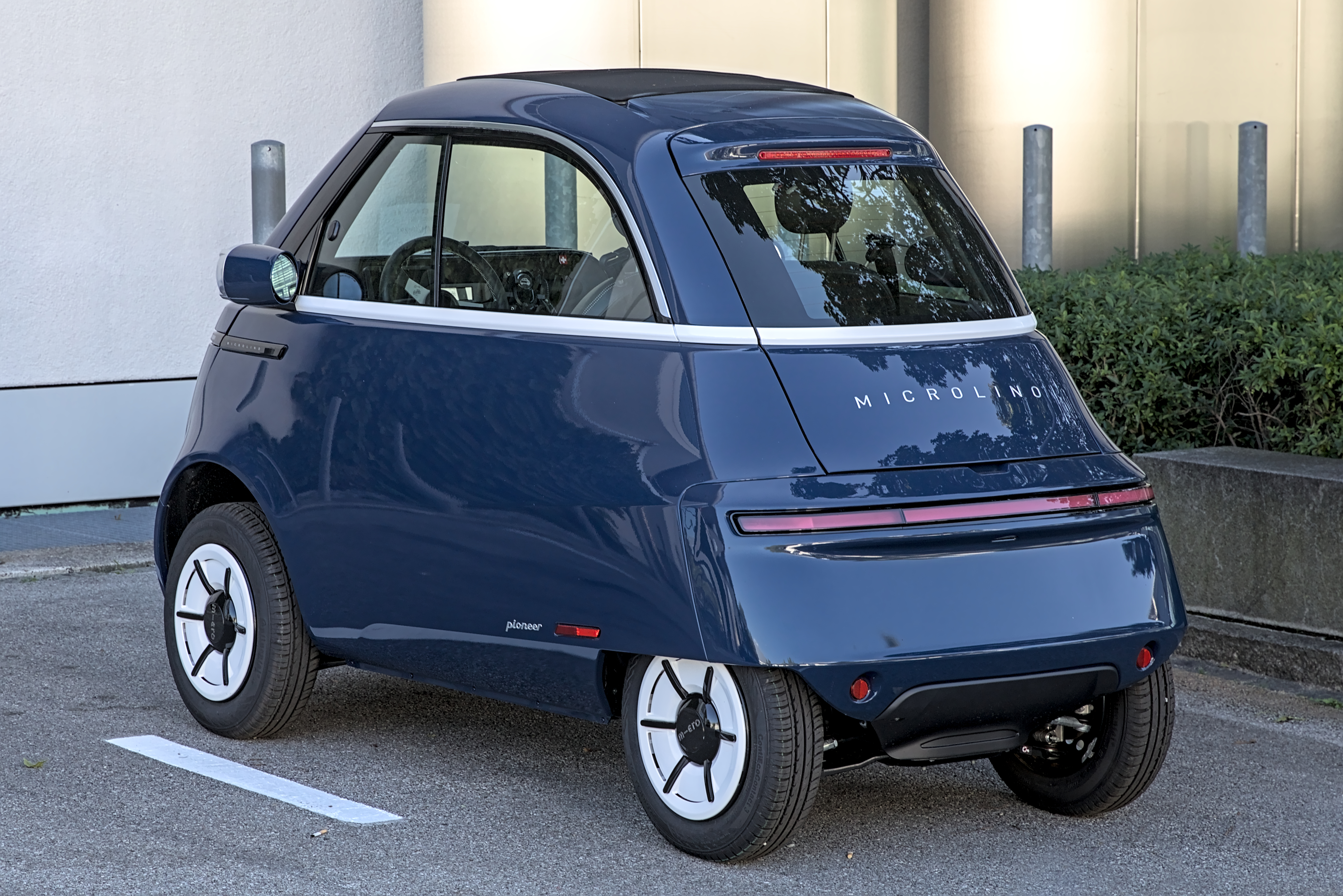
Rear view

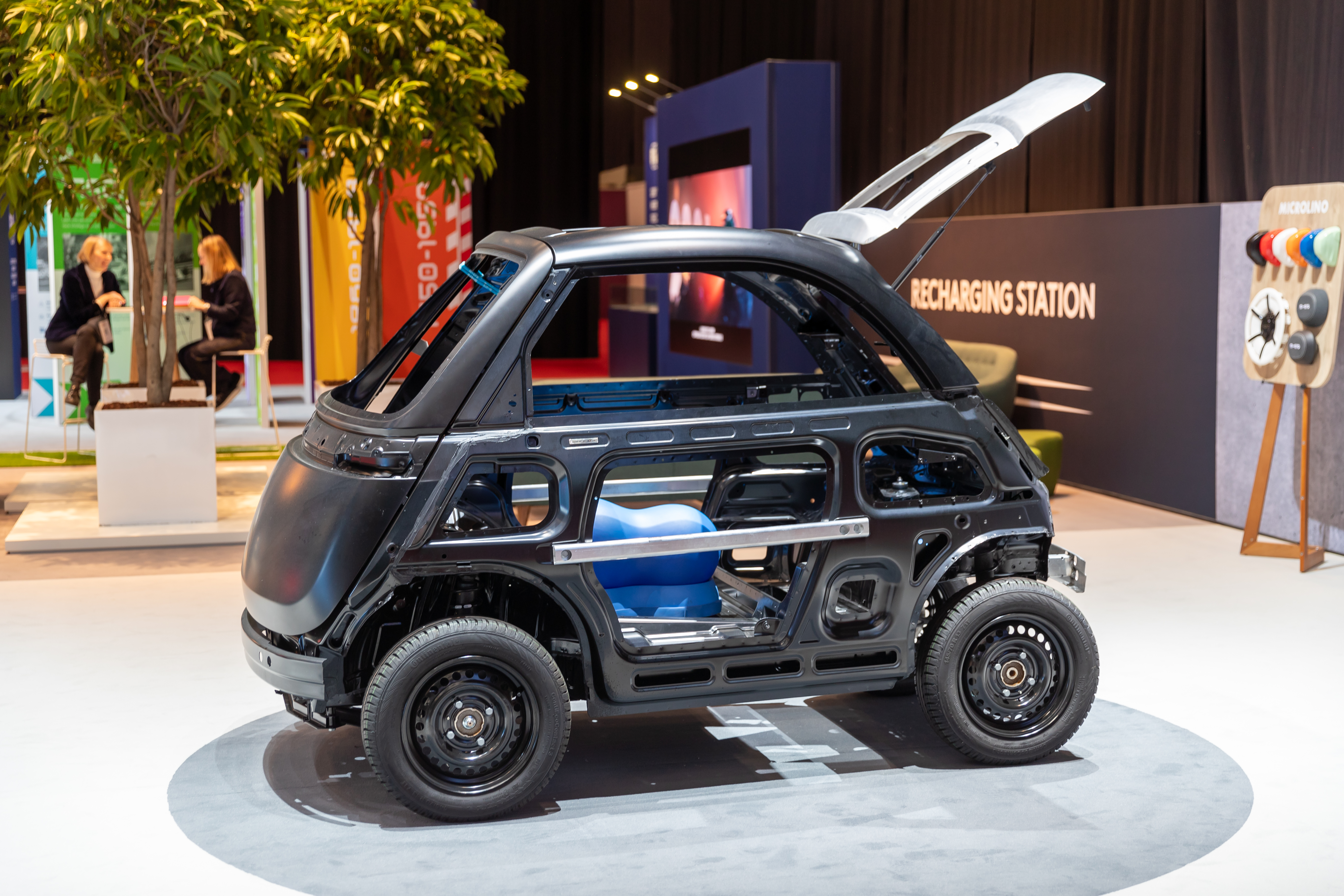
Rolling chassis without body panels

Micro Mobility Systems debuted the Microlino at the 86th Geneva Motor Show in 2016. The vehicle's concept was developed with the Zurich University of Applied Sciences. The idea for the Microlino originated from Wim, Oliver, and Merlin Ouboter, the Swiss family behind the Micro Kickscooter, and the car was initially produced in China.

The Microlino is built for urban mobility, offering the compact size and maneuverability of a motorcycle with weather protection. The design is similar to 1950s Isetta bubble cars.

After presenting the Microlino at the Geneva Motor Show in 2016 as a dynamic PR-gag for the general audience, the company received more than 500 reservations within two days. This sparked the decision to produce the vehicle in series and a collaboration with the Italian company Tazzari was started. However, after two years Tazzari was sold to a German company named Artega. Artega announced in 2019 that --it would launch-- a competing model named “Karolino” and Micro Mobility Systems successfully sued the company in 2019.

In 2022 Micro Mobility Systems started production of the series version of the Microlino 2.0 in its own factory in Turin, Italy.

The Microlino Lite and Microlino Spiaggina were presented as concepts at the 2022 Paris Motor Show, previewing future production models.

In February 2024, Micro Mobility Systems introduced the Microlino Lite, an L6e-class electric Microcar, at the Geneva Motor Show. This variant features a 6 kW motor, a top speed of 45 km/h, and a weight of less than 425 kilograms, making it operable with a moped license in several countries.

In October 2024, Micro Mobility Systems presented the Microlino Spiaggina, a convertible version of its electric microcar, at the Paris Motor Show.

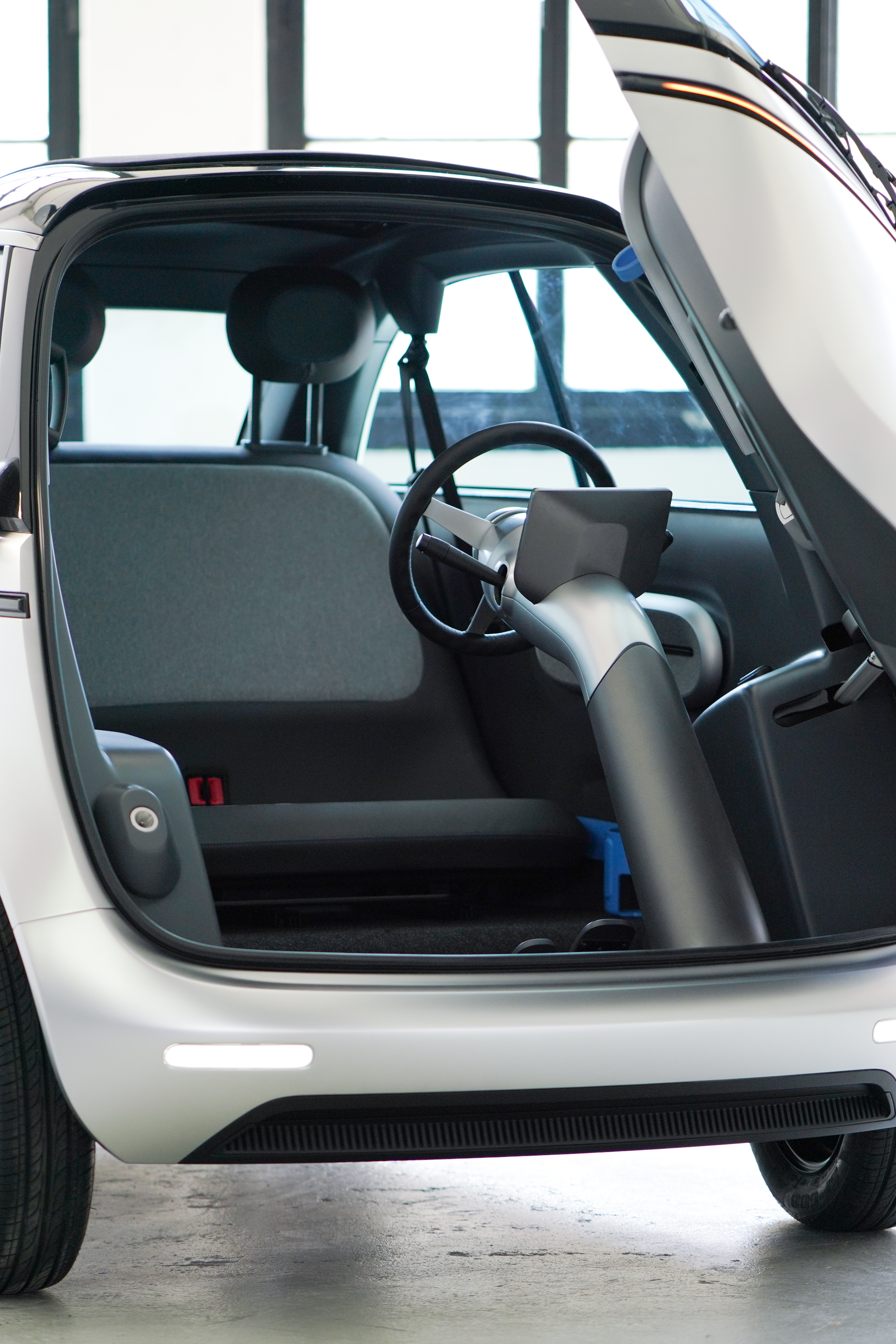
Interior view

=== Production ===
In 2019 a collaboration between Microlino and CECOMP, an Italian automotive company established in 1978, was started in order to refine both the design as well as the engineering of the Microlino 1.0 to the more modern Microlino 2.0. To produce the Microlino, Micro set up its own manufacturing facility in Turin, Italy, where it employs about 100 people.

A special introductory edition was projected for manufacture in mid-2022, at the company's factory in Turin.

In 2024, Micro Mobility Systems announced that approximately 3,700 Microlino vehicles were produced.

== Technical specifications ==
The Microlino is an electric microcar designed for urban mobility, classified as either a light or heavy quadricycle with a compact design. The Microlino was registered under the Hague System for industrial designs, providing intellectual property protection in multiple jurisdictions.

=== Dimensions and weight ===
- Length: 2,519 mm
- Width: 1,473 mm
- Height: 1,501 mm
- Curb Weight: between 496 kg and 530 kg, depending on the configuration.

=== Battery options ===
The Microlino is available with three battery capacities:

- 6 kWh: Approximate range of 91 km.
- 10.5 kWh: Approximate range of 177 km.
- 14 kWh: Approximate range of 230 km.

The car is powered by a rear-mounted electric motor delivering 12.5 kW (17 hp), enabling a top speed of 90 km/h and rear-wheel drive. Charging can be done using a household plug or a Type 2 connector, with times ranging from 3 to 4 hours depending on the battery. It seats two adults and provides 230 liters of storage space, suitable for urban use.

=== Additional models ===
Microlino Lite is a compact vehicle designed for urban commuting, with a top speed of 45 km/h. It is classified as an L6e quadricycle, which allows it to be driven with an AM driver's license, making it accessible to individuals as young as 14 in some regions. The Microlino Lite offers two battery options: 5.5 kWh for a range of approximately 100 kilometers and 10.5 kWh for about 180 kilometers. Charging to 80% capacity takes two to four hours using a 2.2 kW AC charger. The vehicle provides seating for two passengers and features a trunk with capacity for one large check-in suitcase and two cabin-sized suitcases. It also includes a sunroof and a front door design that allows for easier parking in confined spaces.

The Microlino Spiaggina is a limited-edition model inspired by vintage beach vehicles, combining a retro design and electric mobility. It features open sides and a lightweight rear, inspiration from cars like the Fiat 600 Jolly and Citroën Méhari. The vehicle includes a fabric roof that can be rolled back or removed entirely, along with a moisture-resistant synthetic leather interior. The Spiaggina is a L7e vehicle with a range of up to 177 km, a top speed of 90 km/h. This model is available in two colors, Portofino Blue and Sardinia Sage.

== See also ==
- Evetta
- Isetta
