= Evetta =

German electric microcar

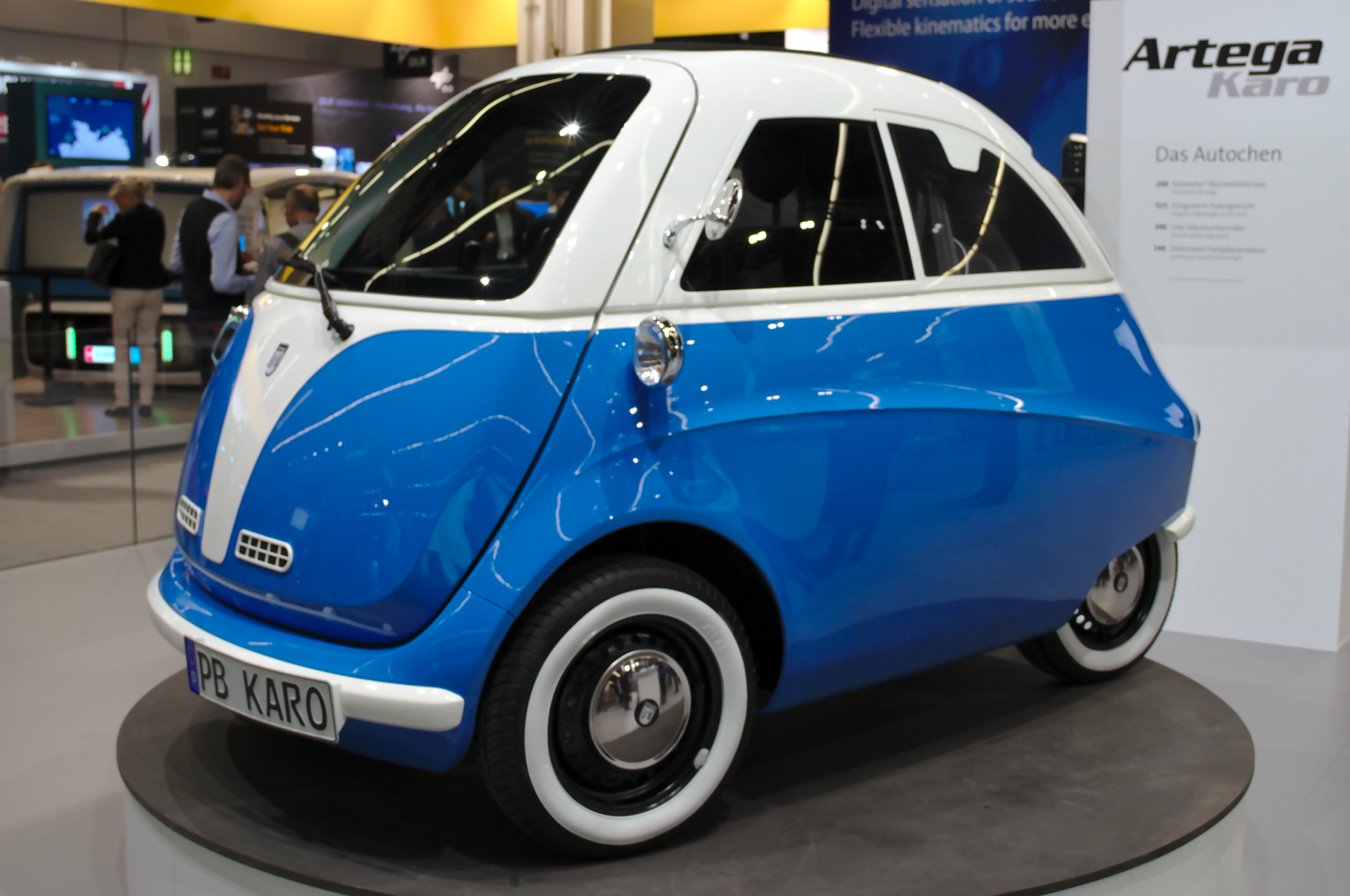
- Artega Karo at the 2019 IAA

Overview
- Manufacturer: Electric Brands
- Also called: Artega Karo
- Production: 2023
- Assembly: Germany
- Designer: Achim Reitze

Body and chassis
- Class: Quadricycle
- Body style: 2-door microcar

Powertrain
- Battery: 16.2 kWh
- Range: 234 km (145 mi)

The Evetta is a small Isetta-inspired electric car produced by the German company Electric Brands. It was presented to the public at the 2022 International Motor Show Germany.

== History ==
The vehicle was originally designed by Artega Automobile in 2019 and was called the Karo.

In 2022 Artega was acquired by German company Electric Brands, who had introduced their Xbus electric truck in 2021.

In February 2024 Electric Brands went into insolvency protection, and the future of the company and its models became unclear.

== Overview ==
The non-commercial versions have a maximum battery capacity of 16.2 kWh, with an autonomy of 234 km (145 mi).

Electric Brands aimed to start delivering the Evetta by the summer of 2023, priced at €19,540 including German taxes.

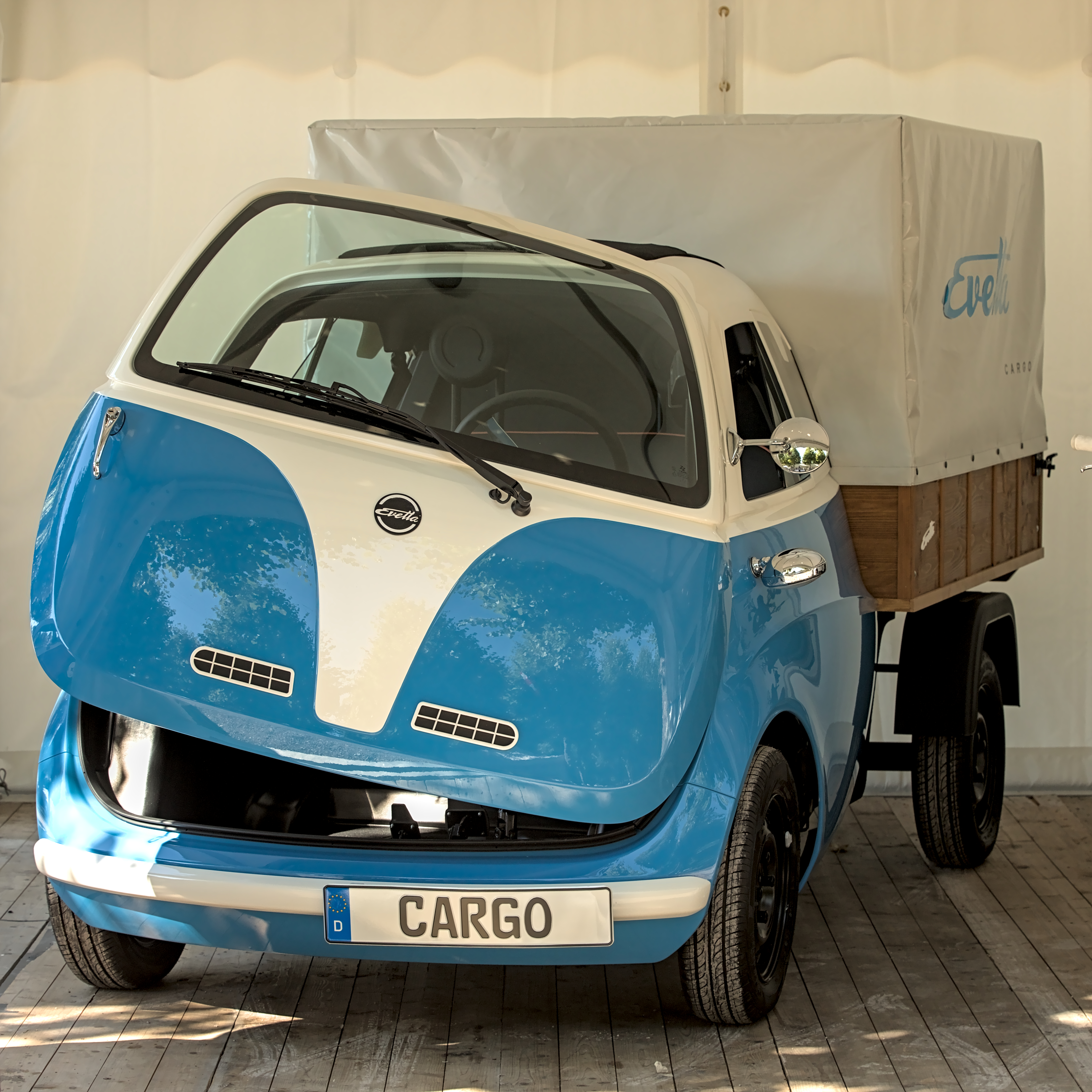
Evetta Cargo

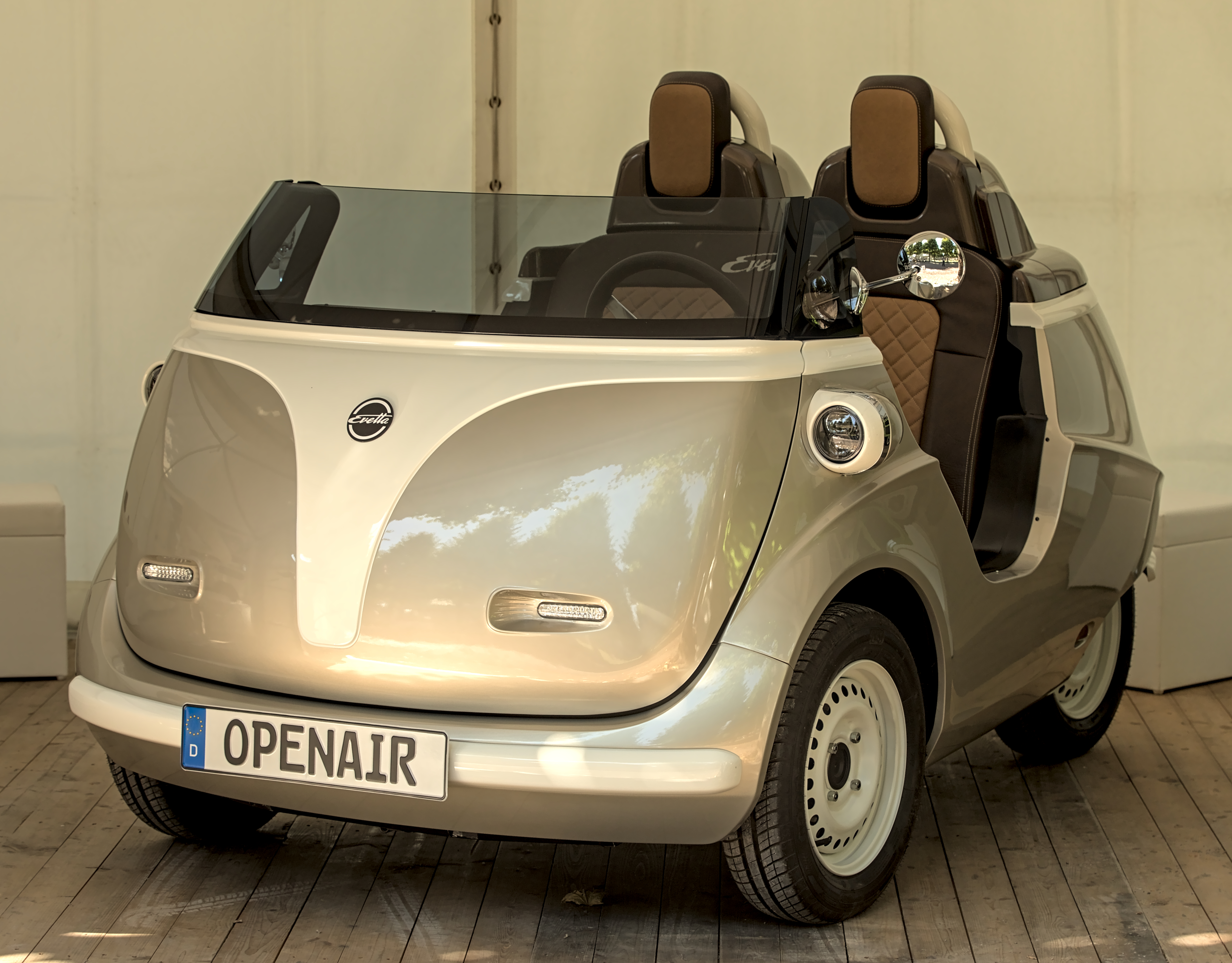
Evetta Openair

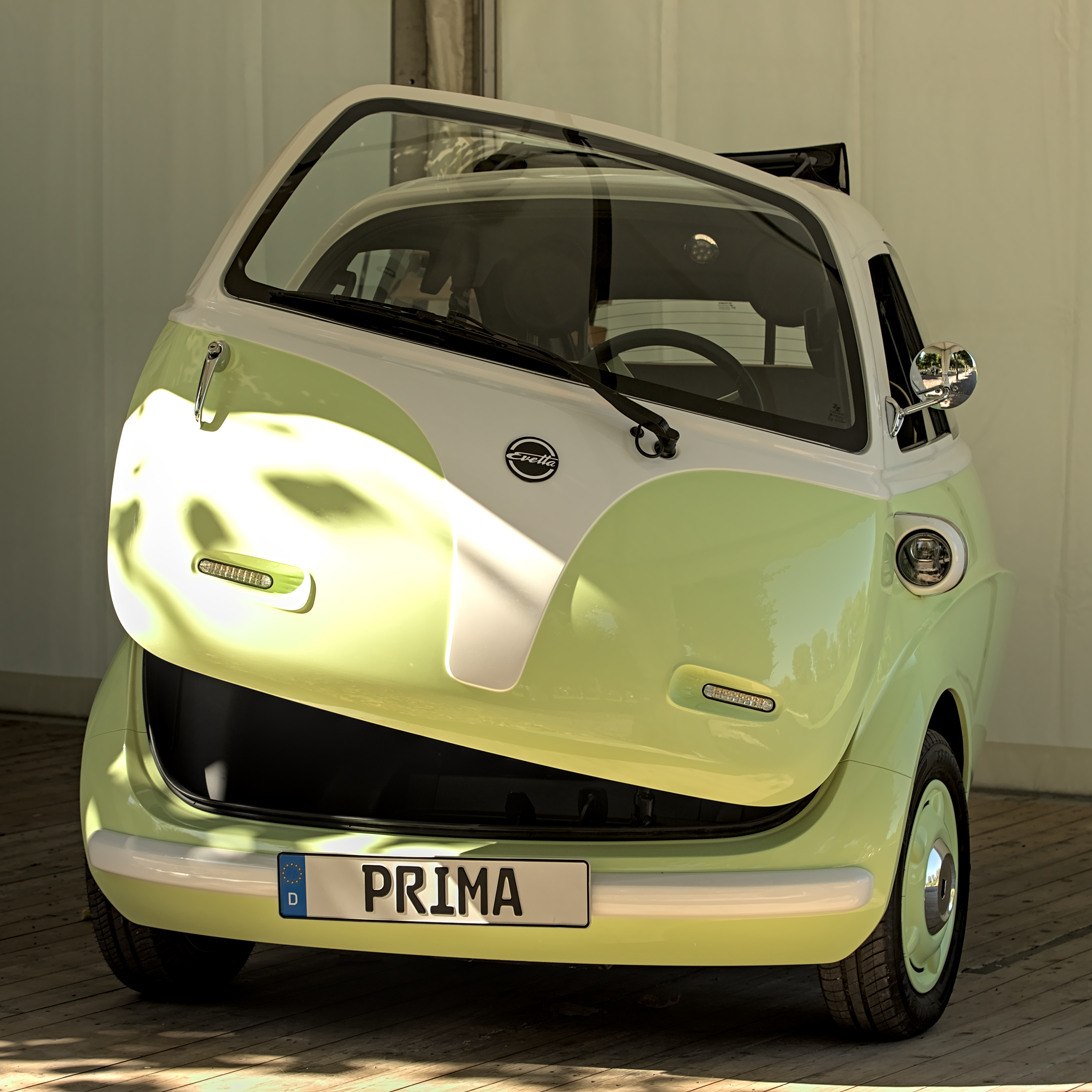
Evetta Prima

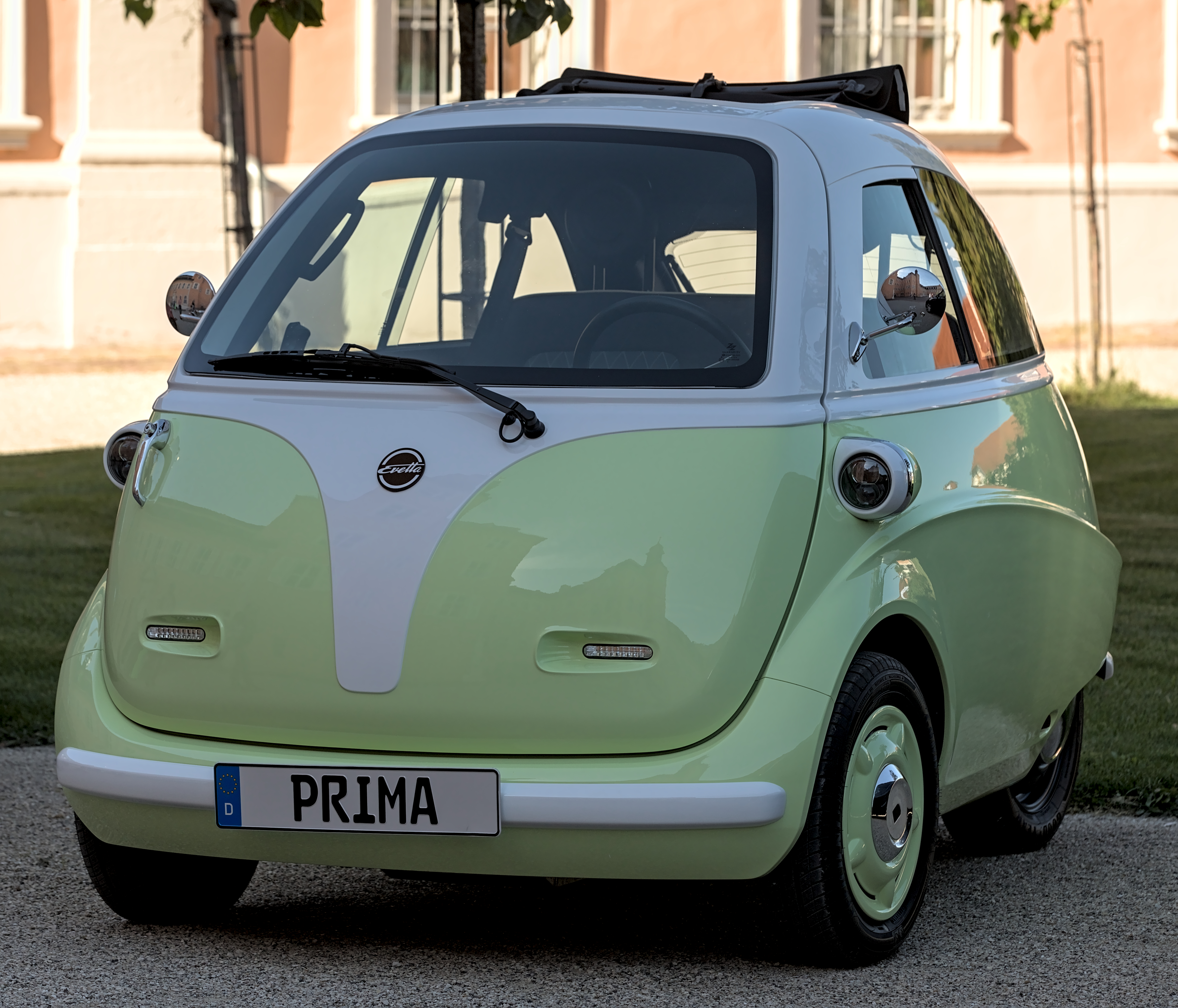
Evetta Prima

== See also ==
- Microlino, another Isetta-inspired electric vehicle
