= VELAM =

Véhicule Léger à Moteur
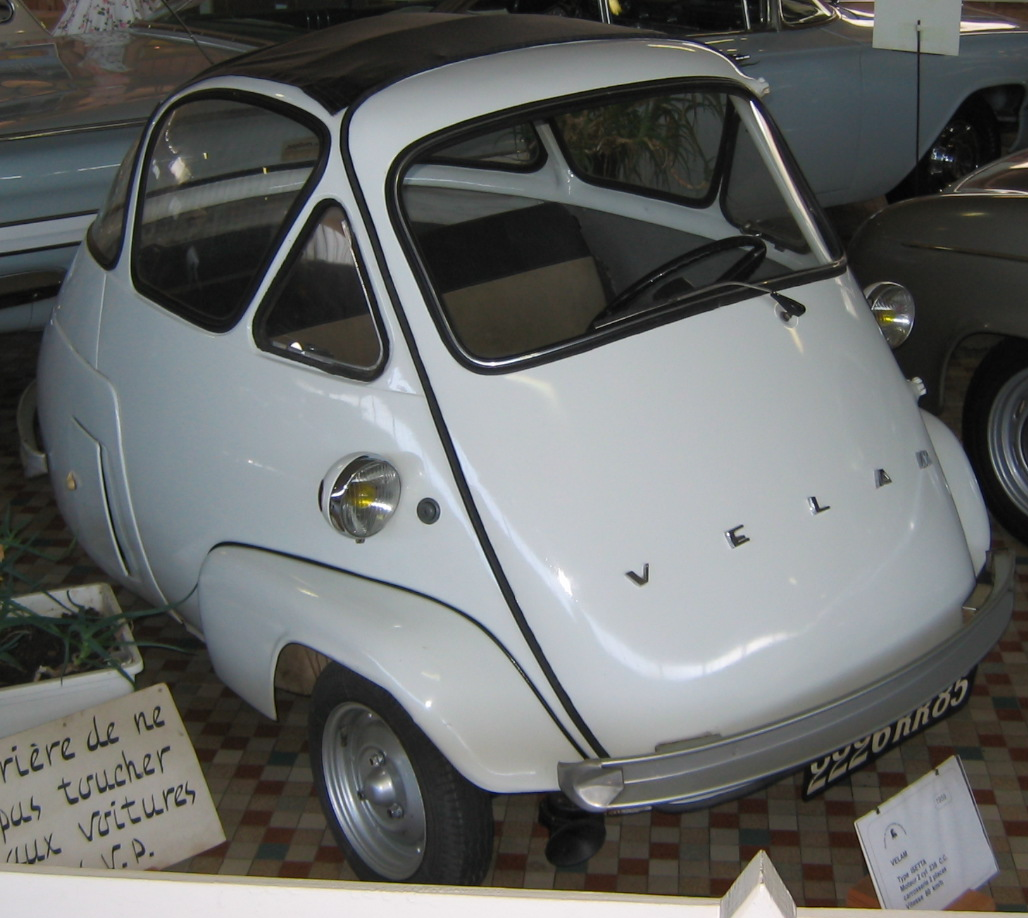
- Industry: Automotive
- Headquarters: France

VELAM (Véhicule Léger à Moteur, or "light vehicle with motor") was a French automobile manufacturer that made VELAM microcars under the licence of the Isetta from the Italian Iso. Powered by a 236 cc engine, it was capable of speeds in excess of 50 mph (80 km/h). Around 5,000 cars were built between 1955 and 1959.

The Velam was featured in the 1957 film Funny Face and the 1962 French film Adieu Philippine.

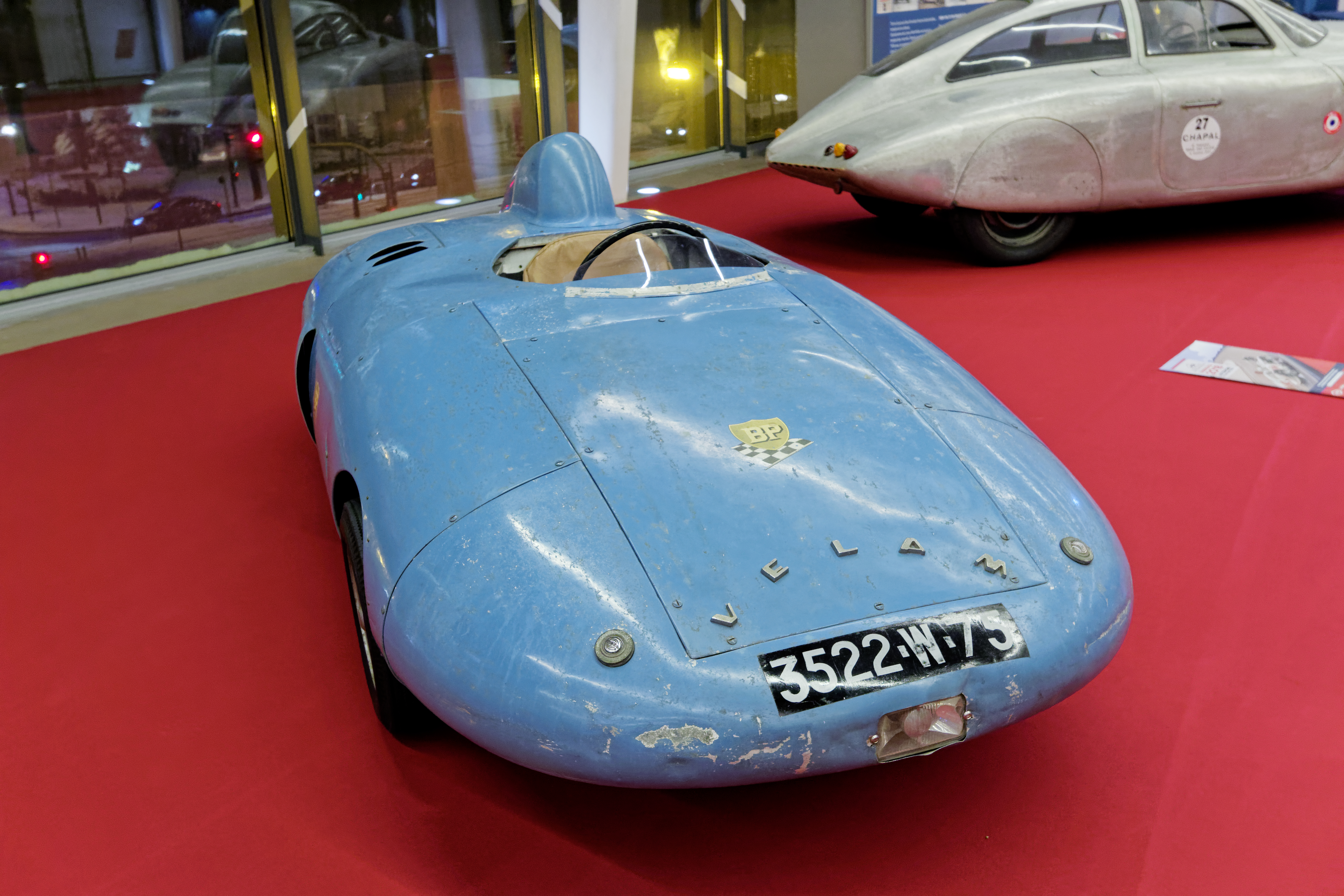
Velam Rekord Car 1957

In 1957 a Rekord Car was built, so 30th July 1957 Bianchi and Claude drove to seven international (class K) records; eleven further were taken.

== See also ==
- Isetta
- Microcar
