= 2022 Paris Motor Show =

International auto show

2022 Paris Motor Show Mondial de l'Automobile 2022
- Genre: Auto show
- Begins: October 18, 2022
- Ends: October 23, 2022
- Location: Paris Expo Porte de Versailles, Paris
- Coordinates: 48.83064, 2.28715
- Country: France
- Previous event: 2018 Paris Motor Show
- Next event: 2024 Paris Motor Show
- Patron: Serge Gachot
- Organiser: Hopscotch Groupe; Plateforme automobile (PFA)
- Website: mondial.paris

The 2022 Paris Motor Show (in French Mondial de l'automobile de Paris or Mondial de l'Auto) is an international auto show, which was held from October 18 to October 23, 2022, at the Paris Expo Porte de Versailles, in Paris, France. It is part of Paris Automotive Week, bringing together the Motor Show and the Equip Auto trade show.

== Presentation ==
The 2022 show celebrates the 124th anniversary of the "International Automobile, Cycle and Sports Exhibition" born in Paris in 1898, and the 121st edition since its creation.

The "2022 Paris Motor Show", the direct heir of this event, is the largest motor show in the world in terms of longevity and attendance, but also one of the rare motor shows to still exist today.

The poster for this 2022 edition was unveiled in March of the same year. It includes bright colours which, according to the organization, represent “a wind of optimism, with a new vision of the automobile”. The slogan is "Revolution is on" ("la révolution est en marche" in French).

Taking place over a single week, attendance is in free fall with 397,812 paid admissions, whereas previous editions exceeded one million admissions.

Some reacted negatively to the 2022 event. One article noted that the event lacked many manufacturers. Mercedes, BMW, Audi, Ferrari, Fiat, and Opel were not present. According to visitors interviewed in the article, the event was "lackluster," took up a much smaller surface area than in years past, and charged too much per ticket.

The event organiser is planning a 2024 edition with more manufacturers and over a two-week period.

=== Attendance ===
The show takes place for the public from 9:30 a.m. to 10:30 p.m. from October 18 to 23, 2022 (7 p.m. on Sundays), October 17 being dedicated only to the international press, and the Equip Auto show ends on October 22.

== Exhibitors ==
The show is exhibited in halls 3, 4 and 6 of the Parc des Expos in Paris.

Manufacturers present this year:

- (France) Alpine
- (China) BYD
- (Romania) Dacia
- (France) Devalliet
- (France) DS Automobiles
- (United States) Fisker Inc.
- (France) Hopium
- (United States) Jeep
- (Switzerland) Micro Mobility Systems
- (France) Mobilize
- (France) NamX
- (China) Ora
- (France) Peugeot
- (France) Renault
- (China) Seres
- (Vietnam) Vinfast
- (China) Wey

Manufacturers absent this year:

- (Italy) Abarth
- (Italy) Alfa Romeo
- (United Kingdom) Aston Martin
- (Germany) Audi
- (United Kingdom) Bentley
- (Germany) BMW
- (France) Citroën
- (Spain) Cupra
- (Italy) Ferrari
- (United States) Ford
- (Japan) Honda
- (South Korea) Hyundai
- (Japan) Infiniti
- (Japan) Isuzu
- (United Kingdom) Jaguar
- (South Korea) Kia
- (United Kingdom) Land Rover
- (Italy) Lamborghini
- (Japan) Lexus
- (France) Ligier
- (United Kingdom) Lotus
- (Italy) Maserati
- (Germany) Mercedes-Benz
- (United Kingdom) Mini
- (Germany) Porsche
- (United Kingdom) Rolls-Royce
- (Spain) SEAT
- (Czech Republic) Škoda
- (Germany) Volkswagen
- (Sweden) Volvo

== Introductions ==
=== Production cars ===
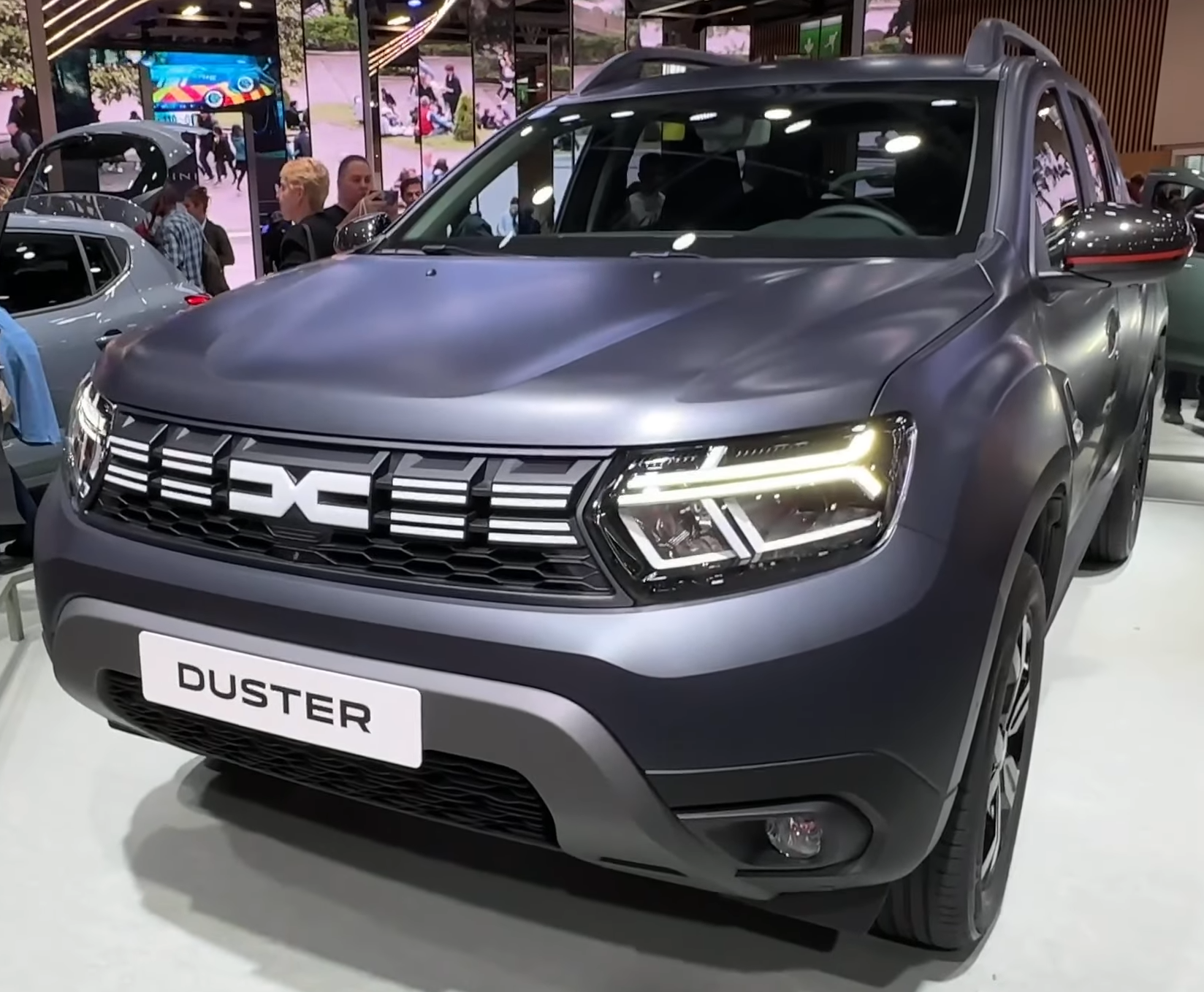
Dacia Duster "Mat Edition" on display

- Alpine A110 R
- BYD Atto 3
- BYD Dolphin
- BYD Han
- BYD Seal
- BYD Tang
- Caselani Citroën Berlingo Fourgonnette
- City Transformer CT-1
- DFSK EC35
- DS 3 - refresh
- DS 4 - update
- DS 7 - refresh
- DS 9 Opéra Première
- Dacia Duster - refresh
- Dacia Duster Mat Edition
- Dacia Jogger - refresh
- Dacia Jogger Hybrid - only the drivetrain
- Dacia Logan - refresh
- Dacia Sandero - refresh
- Dacia Sandero Stepway - refresh
- Dacia Spring - refresh
- Devalliet Mugello
- e.GO e.wave x
- Fisker Ocean
- Genty Akylone
- Jeep Avenger
- Kilow La Bagnole
- Leapmotor C11
- Leapmotor T03
- Lormauto electric Renault Twingo 1
- Maxus eDeliver 9
- Mega e-Scouty
- Mobilize Bento
- Mobilize Duo
- Ora Funky Cat
- Ora Funky Cat GT
- Ora Next Cat
- Pantore Vakog
- Peugeot 408
- Peugeot 508 PSE
- Peugeot e-208
- Renault Austral
- Renault Kangoo E-Tech Electric
- Renault Master Van H2-Tech
- Renault Mégane E-Tech Electric
- Seres 3
- Seres 5
- Silence S04
- Sportequipe S8
- VinFast VF 5
- VinFast VF 6
- VinFast VF 7
- VinFast VF 8
- VinFast VF 9
- Weez City-Pro
- WEY Coffee 01
- WEY Coffee 02
- XEV Yoyo

=== Concept cars ===
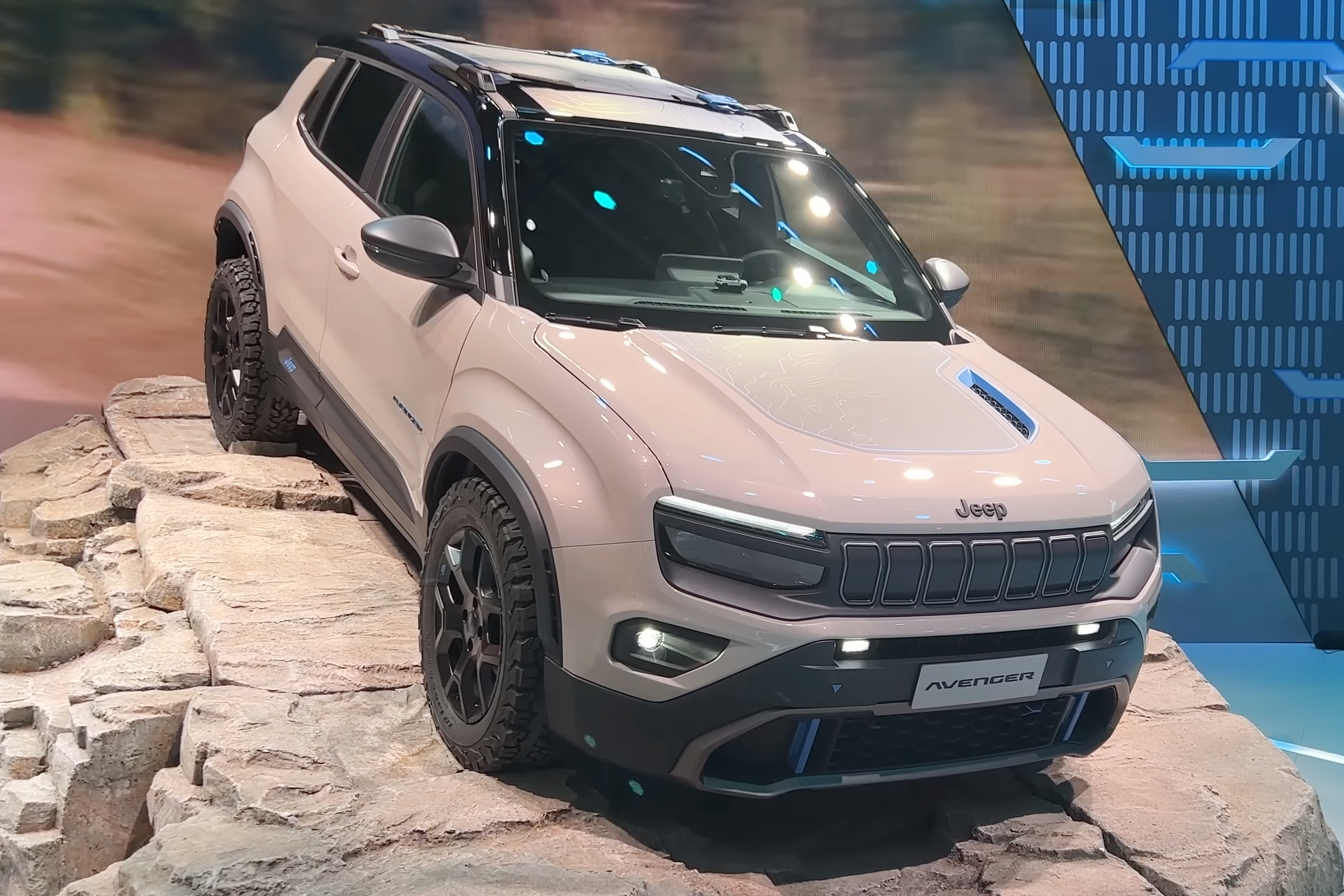
The Jeep Avenger 4xe concept at the 2022 Paris Motor Show

- Alpine A110 E-ternité
- Alpine Alpenglow
- Beltoise BT01
- CID Babieca
- Capgemini Chatenet
- DS E-Tense Performance
- Dacia Manifesto
- Hopium Māchina Vision
- Jeep Avenger 4xe
- KGM ERC140
- Microlino Lite
- Microlino Spiaggina
- NamX HUV
- Peugeot 9X8
- Peugeot Inception - announced
- Raffer TB-02
- Renault 4Ever Trophy
- Renault Hippie Caviar Motel
- Renault R5 Turbo 3E
- Renault Scénic Vision
- Vilebrequin 1000tipla
- Weez City-4

=== Miscellaneous ===
- Aircode DRS Lapierre x Alpine
- Lego Lamborghini Sián FKP 37
- Peugeot e-Streetzone

Vehicles available for test drive:

- BYD Atto 3, Tang, Han and Song
- Citroën ë-Jumpy and ë-Jumpy Hydrogen
- DFSK C35
- Ford Mustang Mach-E
- Ford e-Transit
- Hyundai Nexo
- Maxus 3 and 9
- Peugeot e-Expert and e-Expert Hydrogen
- Renault Master (20 m3)
- Renault Trucks E-Tech D (16 t)
- Seres 3
- Toyota Mirai

== Controversy ==
Protesters from the French faction Extinction Rebellion glued themselves to some Ferrari cars on display at the Paris Motor Show, after a similar incident happened earlier in Germany.

== See also ==
- 2018 Paris Motor Show
- Tokyo Motor Show
- International Motor Show Germany
- Geneva Motor Show
