= Zacua MX3 =

Electric microcar

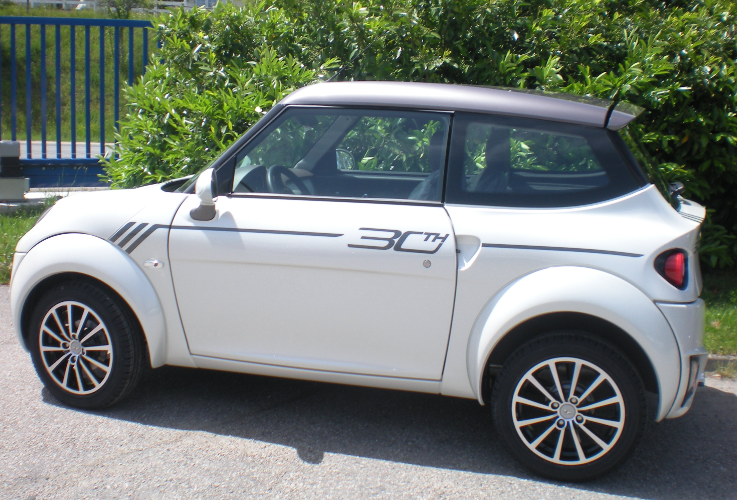

Overview
- Manufacturer: Zacua
- Also called: Zacua MX2 (coupe variant)
- Production: 2017–present
- Assembly: Mexico: Puebla

Body and chassis
- Class: Microcar
- Body style: 2-door coupé; 2-door hatchback
- Layout: Front-engine, front-wheel-drive

Powertrain
- Electric motor: Single motor
- Electric range: 199 km (124 mi)

Dimensions
- Wheelbase: 1,370 mm (54 in)
- Length: 3,065 mm (121 in)
- Width: 1,770 mm (70 in)
- Height: 1,442 mm (57 in)
- Kerb weight: 685 kg (1,510 lb)

The Zacua MX3 is an electric microcar produced and marketed by Zacua. Introduced in 2017, it is the company's first vehicle.

== History ==
The concept of the first ever domestic electric car in the history of the Mexican automotive industry was created in mid-2017, when Zacua was founded in Mexico City. It entered into a partnership with the French microcar manufacturer Automobiles Chatenet, resulting in a fully electric Mexican counterpart called the MX3. The premiere of the vehicle took place right after the company was founded, in August 2017.

The MX3 is distinguished by two-tone body paint, plastic body trim, as well as round headlights and taillights. The handles are hidden behind the door edges, with a special recess. The MX3 was created for the domestic Mexican market, where the cars were offered to buyers from the second half of 2018. Production started at the Puebla plant in May 2018, with prices starting at 550,000 pesos.

== MX2 ==
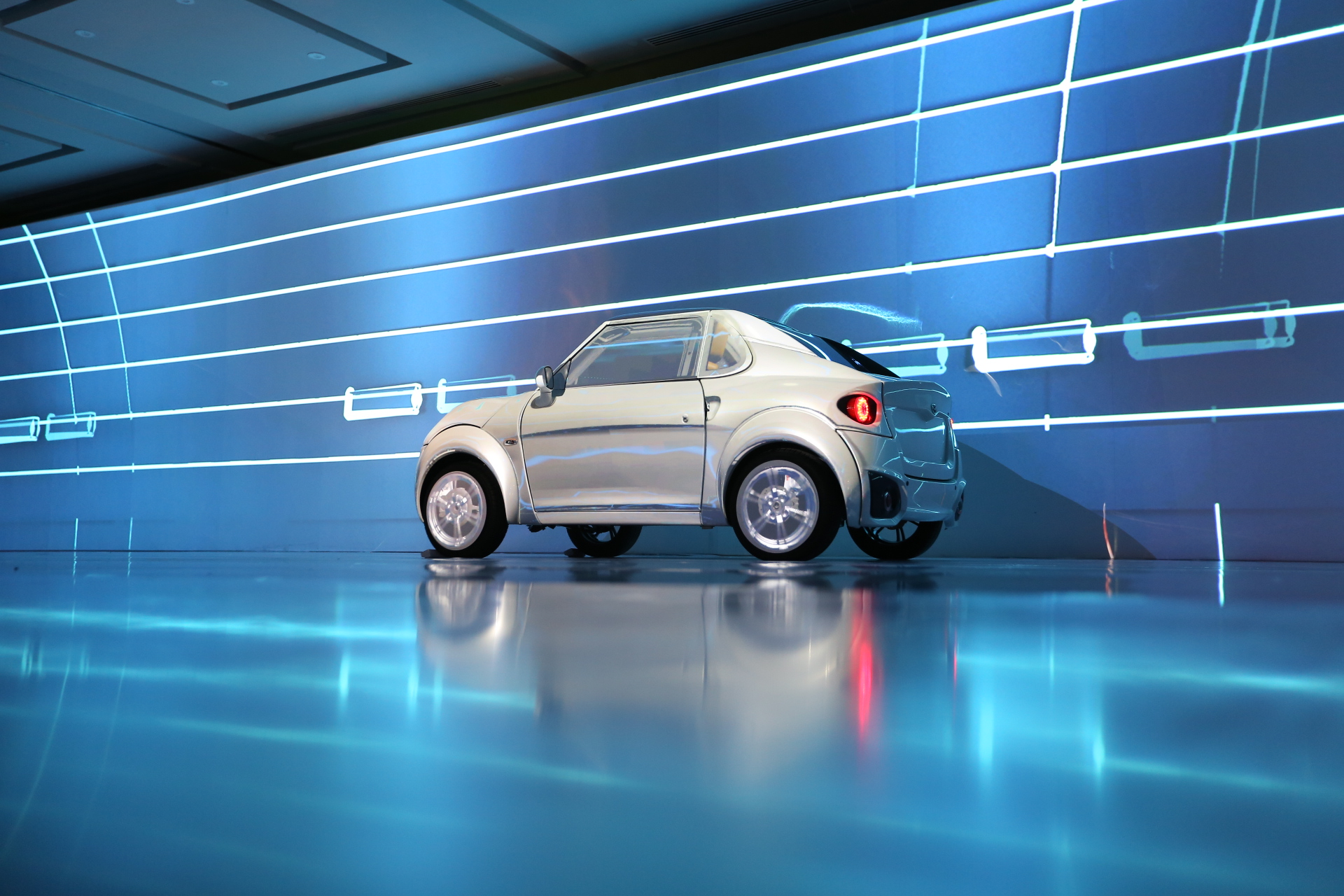
Zacua MX2

In addition to the MX3, Zacua has also expanded its offer with a coupe variant with a gently sloping roof and a stepped rear end, known as the MX2. It received the same technical specification as the MX3.

== Specifications ==
The Spanish company Dynamik Technological Alliance provided the development of the fully electric drive system, while the batteries are supplied from a Chinese producer. The Zacua MX3 and MX2 are characterized by a 46 HP engine and a 15.6 kWh battery. This allows them to travel about 160 km (99 mi) on a single charge.
