= Hy4 =

Hy4 or HY4 may refer to:

- DLR HY4, a hydrogen-powered aircraft
- Alpine Alpenglow Hy4, a hydrogen-powered concept car
- Tencent Hy4, a large language model
