= Hopium =

French car manufacturer

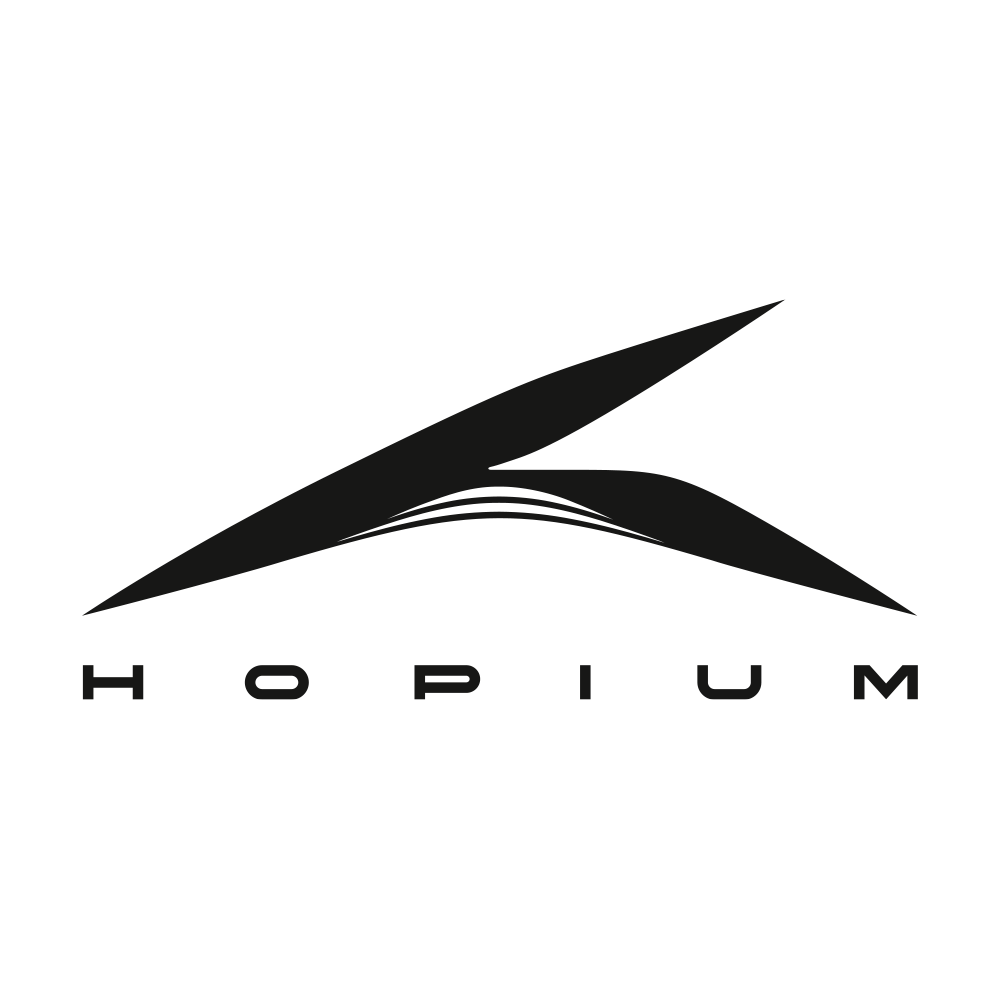
- Company type: Société anonyme à conseil d'administration (s.a.i.)
- Traded as: Euronext Growth
- Founded: October 28, 2019
- Founder: Olivier Lombard
- Headquarters: Paris, France
- Key people: Olivier Lombard (founder and CEO)
- Products: Miscellaneous specialized, scientific and technical activities
- Revenue: 0 euro (2022)
- Operating income: −20,912,652 euro (2022)
- Net income: −23,883,954 euro (2022)
- Number of employees: 161 (2022)
- Website: www.hopium.com

Hopium is a French automobile brand created in 2019 by Olivier Lombard, a French racing driver.

== History ==
Founded in 2019 by young French racing driver Olivier Lombard, the youngest winner of the 24 Hours of Le Mans in the LMP2 category, Hopium aims to launch and assemble a hydrogen-powered automobile in France.

On December 23, 2020, Hopium was listed on the Access compartment of Euronext Paris.

In May 2021, the French equipment manufacturer Plastic Omnium announced a partnership with the automotive brand and would supply the hydrogen storage system for the Hopium Māchina.

On June 17, 2021, the brand presented its first rolling prototype called Alpha 0 on the sidelines of the Viva Technology show in Paris. Hopium took advantage of this announcement to open its book of 1,000 numbered pre-orders at the reservation price of €410.

On October 21, 2021, Hopium and Saint-Gobain Sekurit announced a partnership to co-develop the windows of the Māchina, the first model of the French car brand.

In 2022, Minister of Transport Jean-Baptiste Djebbari under the Jean Castex government joined the company's board of directors, which sparked controversy. Haute Autorité pour la transparence de la vie publique (HATVP) gave an opinion on this professional project, excluding a priori the risk of illegal taking of interests, but indicating an ethical risk which makes it necessary to supervise the former minister.

== Māchina Vision ==
Hopium Māchina Vision
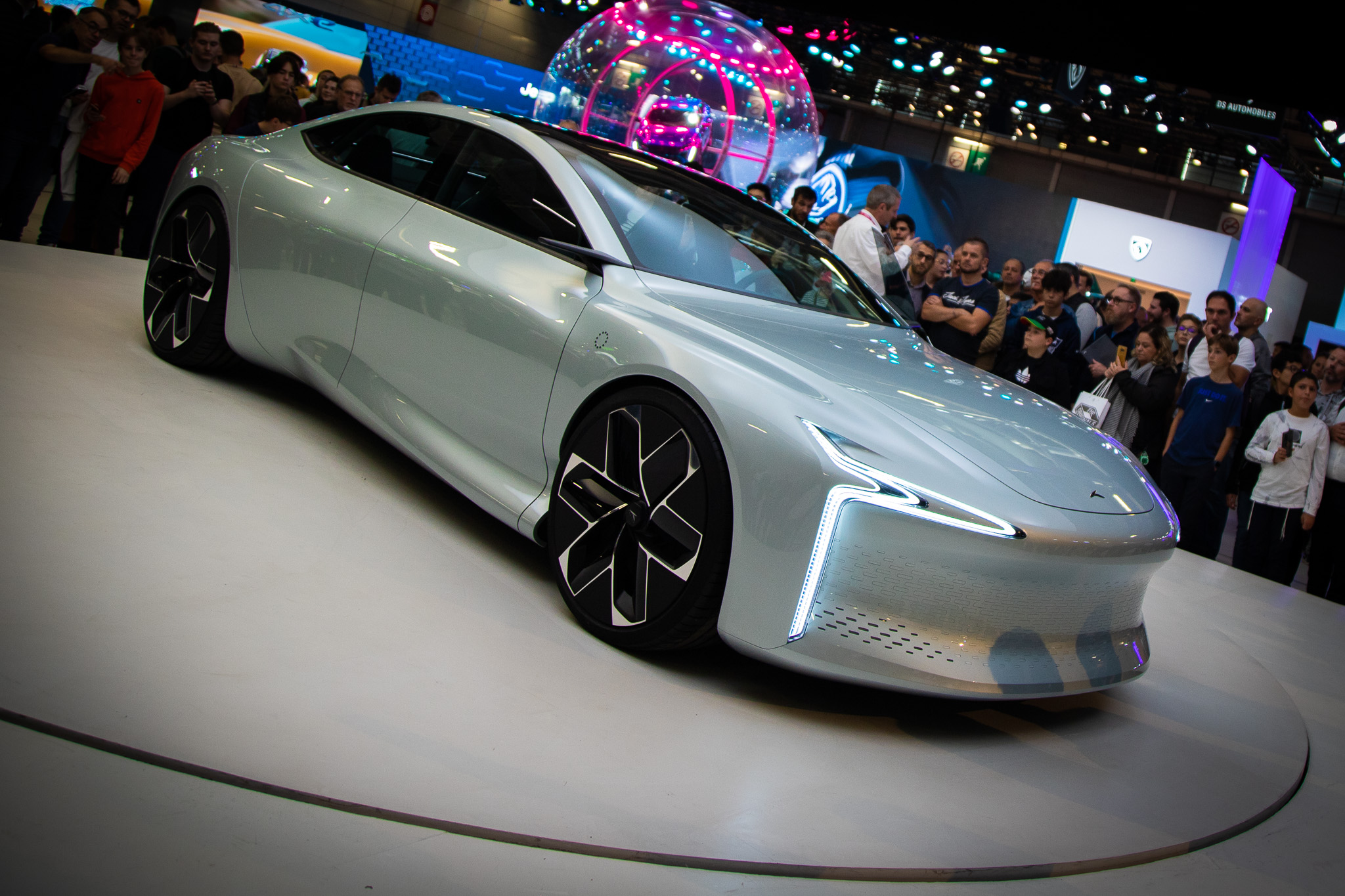
- The Māchina Vision at the 2022 Paris Motor Show

Overview
- Manufacturer: Hopium
- Production: 2025 (to commence)

Body and chassis
- Class: Concept car
- Body style: 5-door sedan

Powertrain
- Power output: 368–500 kW (493–671 hp)
- Range: 1,000 km (620 mi)

The Hopium Māchina Vision is a hydrogen fuel cell electric luxury sedan from French car manufacturer Hopium. It was presented at the 2022 Paris Motor Show and scheduled to be produced from 2025 at a price of 120,000 euros. A rolling prototype was unveiled in June 2021.

=== History ===
This Hopium concept car project (created in 2019 by Olivier Lombard, former French driver of the GreenGT H2) is a technological showcase for a future hydrogen car, created by Felix Godard (former designer at Porsche, Tesla and Alpine). It has a futuristic design, 4 bucket seats, panoramic glass roof with controlled opacity and dashboard with digital haptic display.

It is powered by a 368 kW (493 hp) electric motor with a claimed top speed of 230 km/h (140 mph). The engine is powered by an electric battery recharged by a hydrogen fuel cell, with a 10 kg (22 lb) hydrogen tank at 700 bar pressure, and has an advertised range of 1,000 km (620 mi).
