= 2014 Paris Motor Show =

International auto show

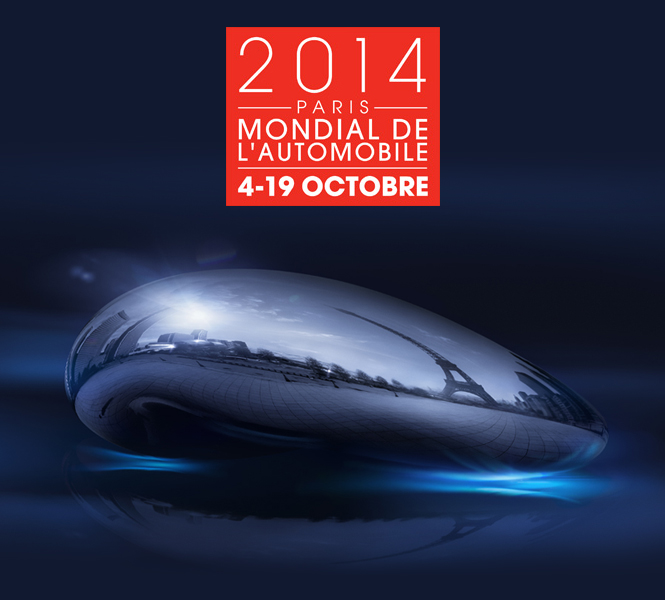
- Paris Motor Show 2014 poster
- Genre: Auto show
- Begins: October 4, 2014
- Ends: October 19, 2014
- Venue: Paris Expo Porte de Versailles
- Location: Paris
- Country: France
- Previous event: 2012 Paris Motor Show
- Next event: 2016 Paris Motor Show

The 2014 Paris Mondial de l'Automobile or 2014 Paris Motor Show took place from 4 October to 19 October 2014 on 'Automobile and Fashion' theme.

== Introductions ==
=== Production cars ===
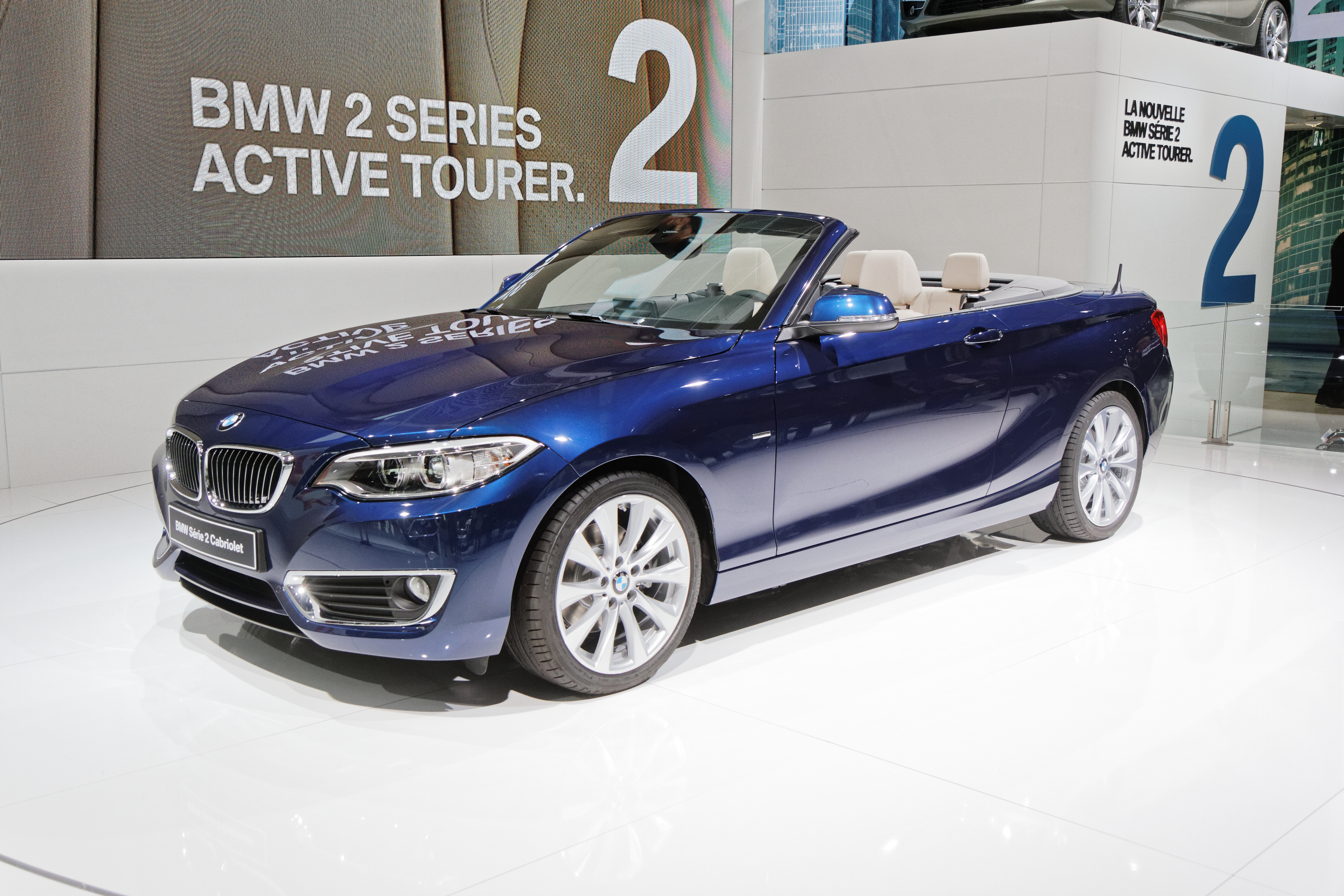
BMW 2 Series Convertible at Paris 2014

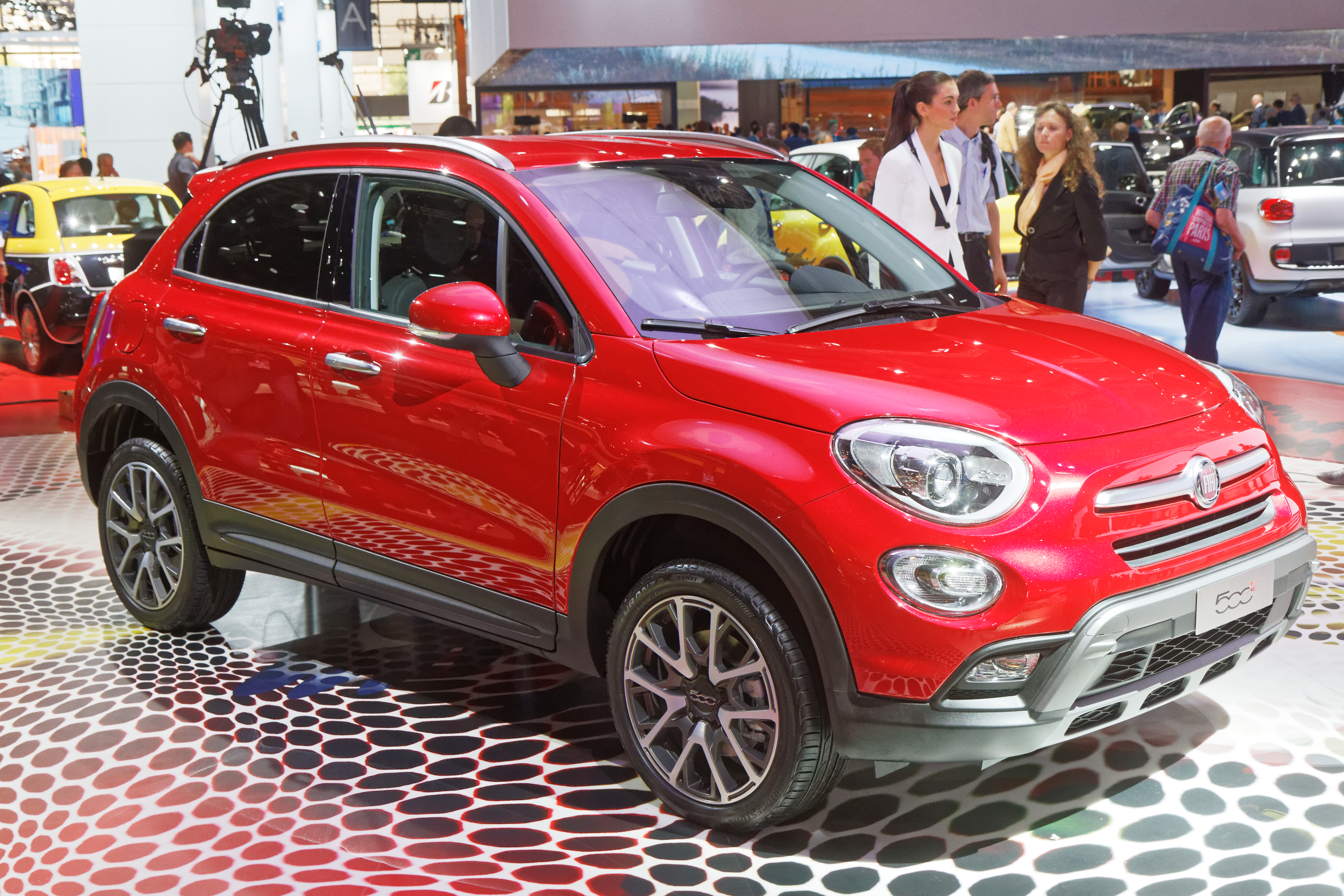
Fiat 500X at Paris 2014

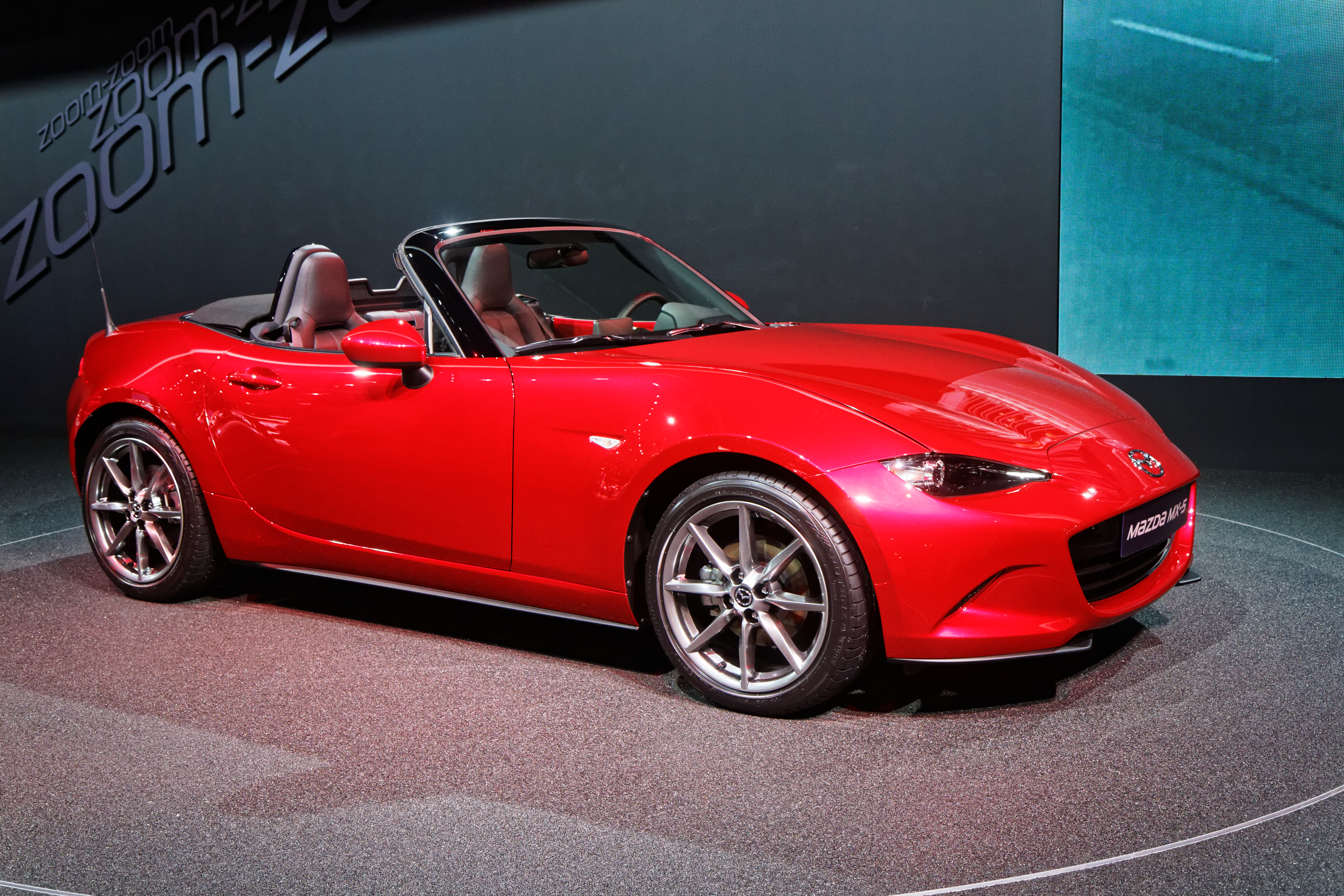
Mazda MX-5 at Paris 2014

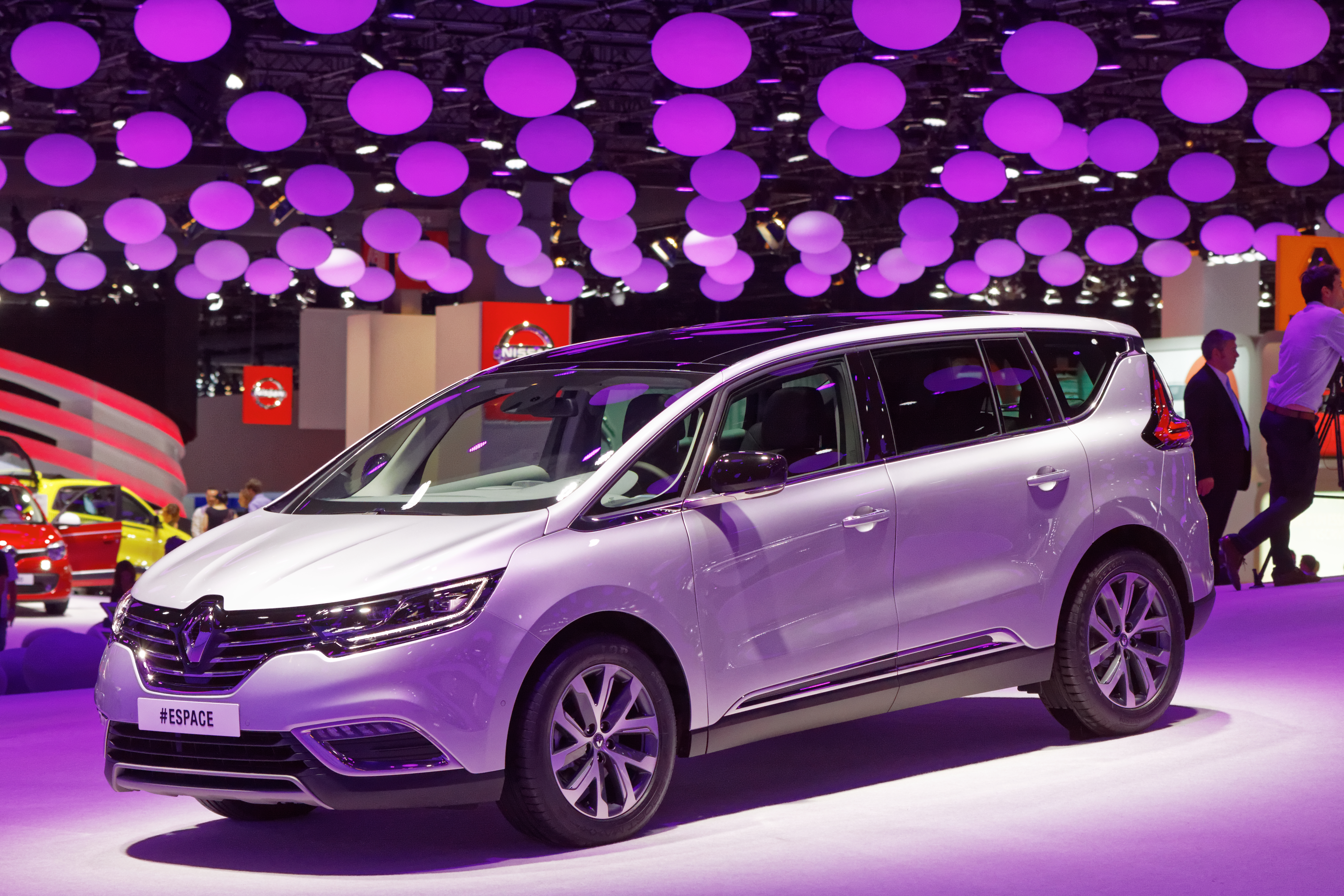
Renault Espace at Paris 2014

- Audi A1 facelift
- Audi A6 facelift
- Audi TT Roadster
- Audi R8
- Bentley Mulsanne Speed
- BMW 2 Series Convertible
- BMW 7 Series Final Edition
- 2015 BMW X6
- Chevrolet Captiva Facelift
- Ferrari 458M Turbo
- Ferrari 458 Speciale A
- Fiat 500X
- Ford C-Max Facelift
- Ford S-Max
- Honda Civic facelift
- Honda HR-V
- Hyundai i20 European Debut
- Infiniti Q70
- Jaguar XE
- Kia Sorento
- Land Rover Discovery Sport
- Mazda 2
- Mazda MX-5 Miata
- Mercedes-Benz AMG GT
- Mercedes-Benz B-Class Facelift
- Nissan Pulsar
- Opel Corsa E
- Peugeot 208 GTi 30th Anniversary Edition
- Peugeot 308 GT
- Porsche Cayenne PHEV
- Renault Espace
- Škoda Fabia
- Smart Forfour
- Smart Fortwo
- SsangYong XIV
- Suzuki Vitara
- Volkswagen GL Sport
- Volkswagen Golf Alltrack
- Volkswagen Passat GTE
- Volkswagen Polo GTI
- Volvo XC90

=== Concept cars ===
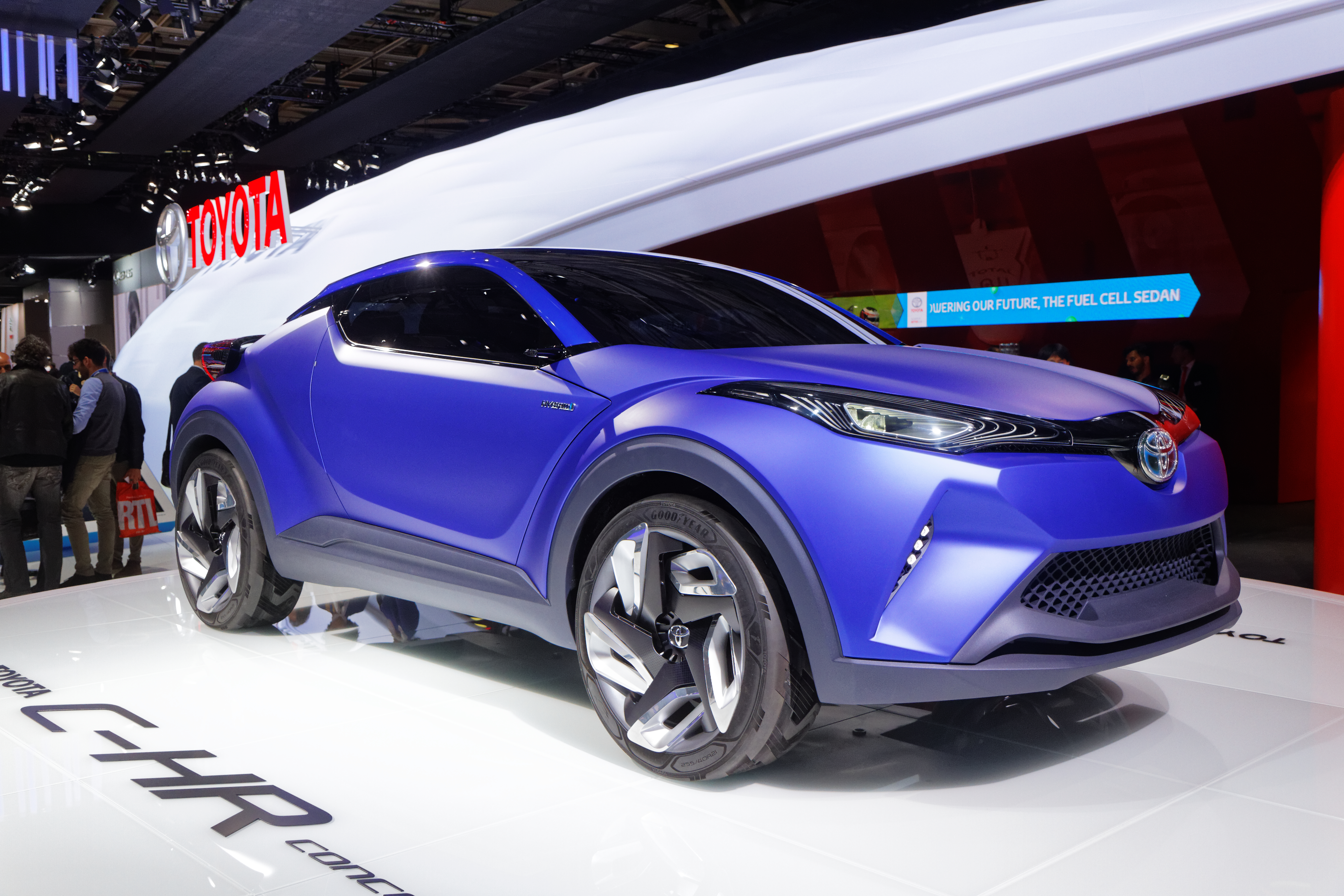
Toyota C-HR Concept at Paris 2014

- Audi TT SportBack
- Citroën C4 Cactus Airflow 2L
- Citroën DS Divine
- Infiniti Q80
- Mitsubishi Outlander PHEV
- Renault Eolab
- Peugeot Exalt
- Toyota C-HR
- Lamborghini Asterion LPI 910-4

=== Motorsport cars ===
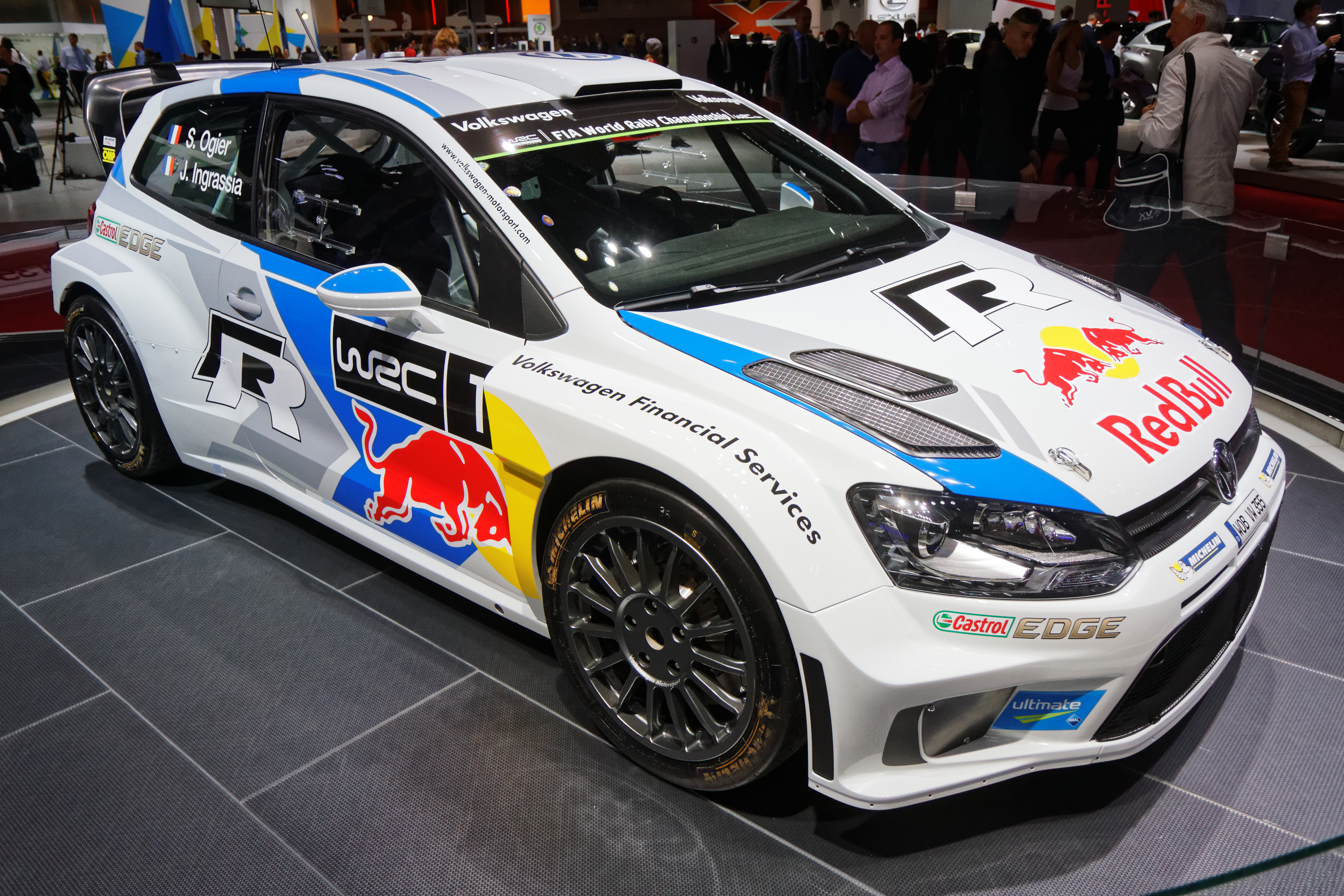
Volkswagen Polo R WRC at Paris 2014

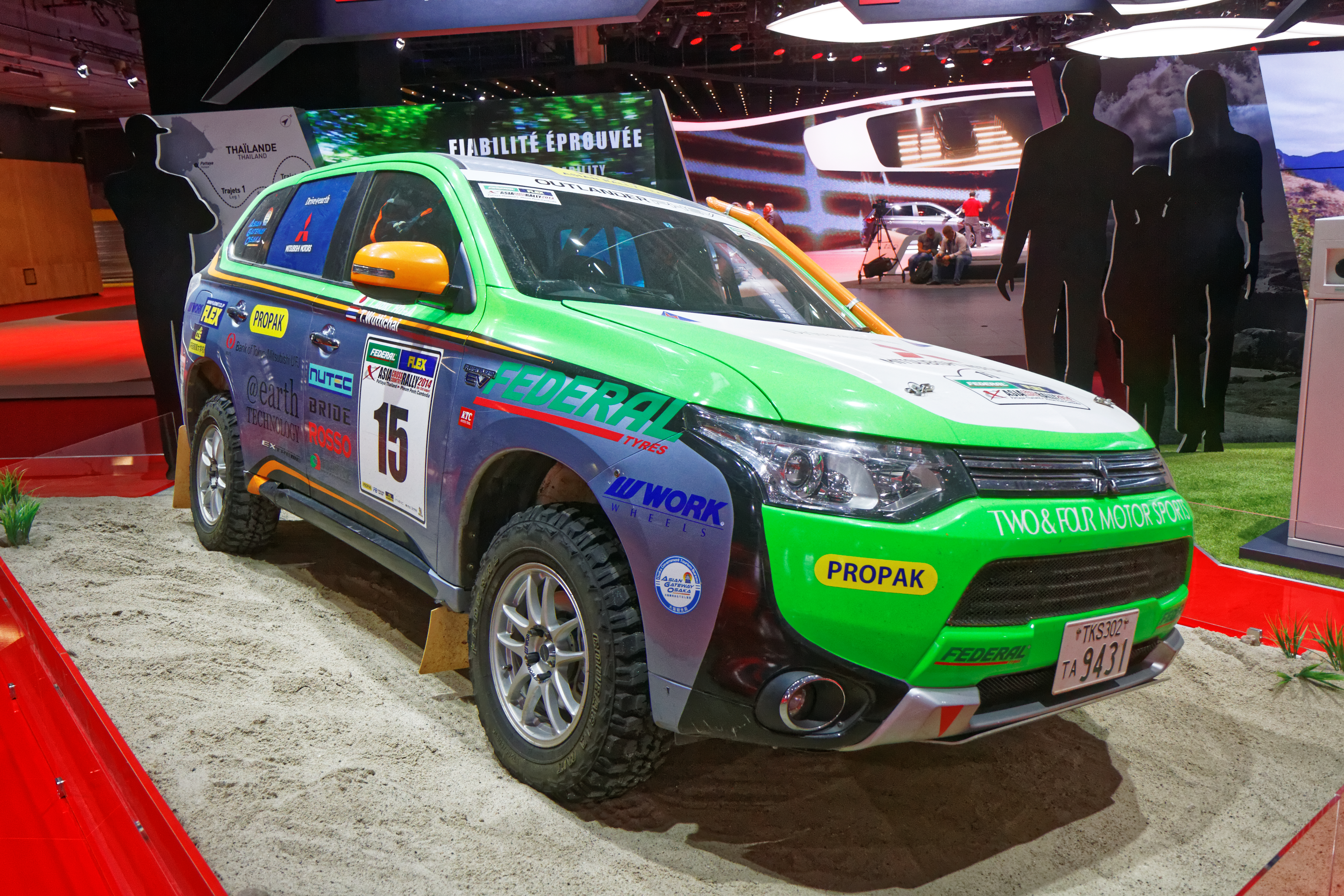
Mitsubishi Outlander PHEV at Paris 2014

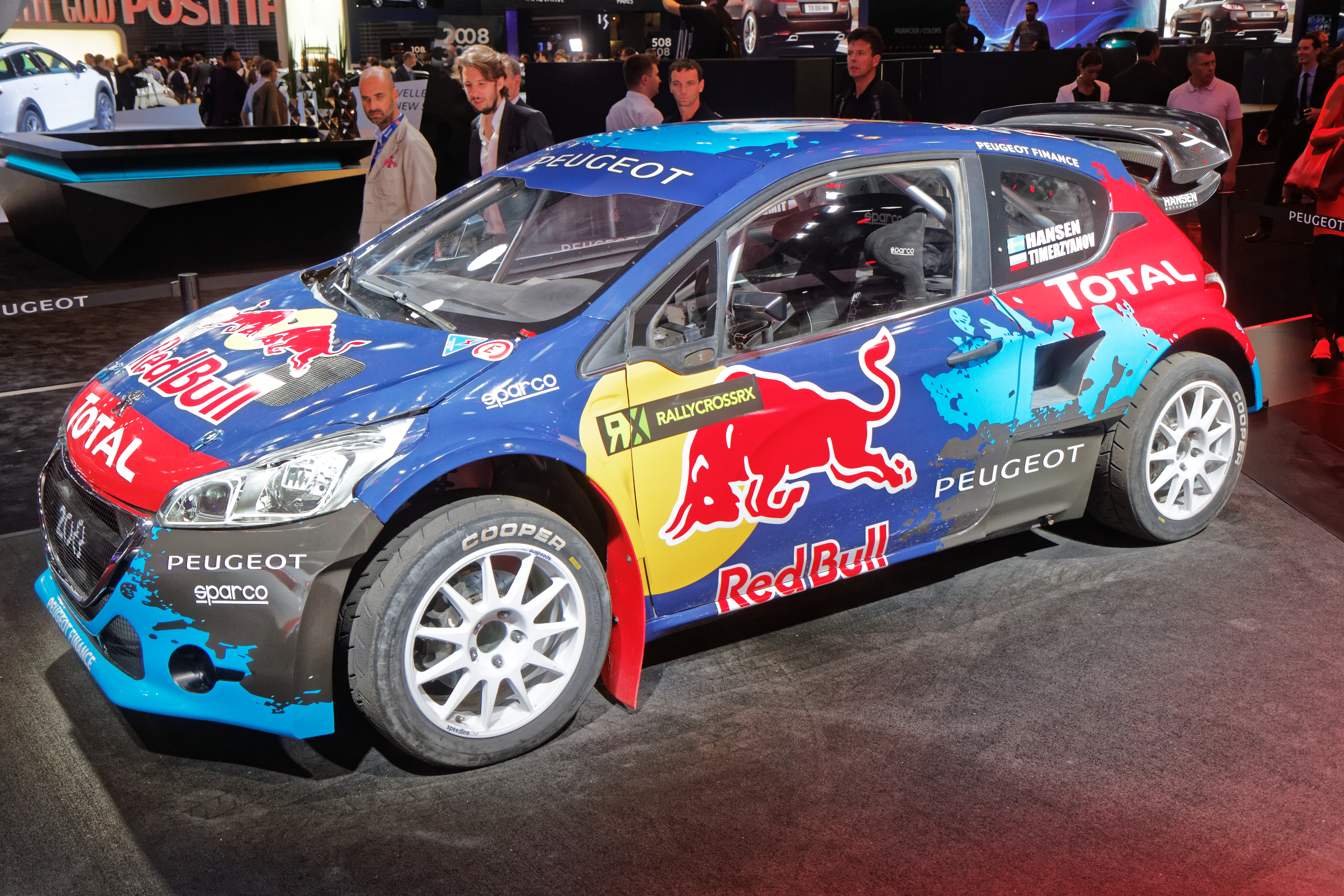
Peugeot 208 WRX at Paris 2014

- Citroën DS3 WRC
- Hyundai i20 WRC
- Mitsubishi Outlander PHEV for Australasian Safari
- Peugeot 208 WRC
- Peugeot 208 WRC-2
- Peugeot 208 WRX FIA European Rallycross Championship
- Volkswagen Polo R WRC (European Debut)

== Exhibitors ==
- Abarth
- Alfa Romeo
- Aston Martin
- Audi
- Bentley
- BMW
- Citroën
- Comarth
- Courb
- Dacia
- Dangel
- DS
- Eon Motors
- Ferrari
- Fiat
- Ford
- Honda
- Hyundai
- Infiniti
- Isuzu
- Jaguar
- Jeep
- Kia
- Lamborghini
- Lancia
- Land Rover
- Lexus
- Ligier
- Maserati
- Mazda
- Mega
- Mercedes-Benz
- Microcar
- Mini
- Mitsubishi
- Nissan
- Opel
- Peugeot
- PGO
- Porsche
- Renault
- Rolls-Royce
- Seat
- Škoda Auto
- Smart
- SsangYong
- Subaru
- Suzuki
- Tesla Motors
- Toyota
- Venturi
- Volkswagen
- Volvo

=== The Automobile and Fashion Exhibition ===
The 2014 Paris Motor Show will be based on the 'Automobile and Fashion' theme. Around 40 cars will be the part of exhibition in partnership with INA at Pavilion 8. All these cars will be from the year before 1900 to the current year and that includes pre-war, post-war, art years and environment-friendly customization of the contemporary era as well.

=== Electric and Hybrid Vehicle Testing Center ===
The 2014 Paris Motor Show will host an event for the testing of electric and hybrid vehicle testing at the pavilion 2/1. This will be the first time that the live testing for the visitor will be done at an automobile event. The car manufacturers like BMW, Courb, Eon, Kia, Nissan, Mercedes, Renault and other will be participating in the testing.
