= DS E-Tense Performance =

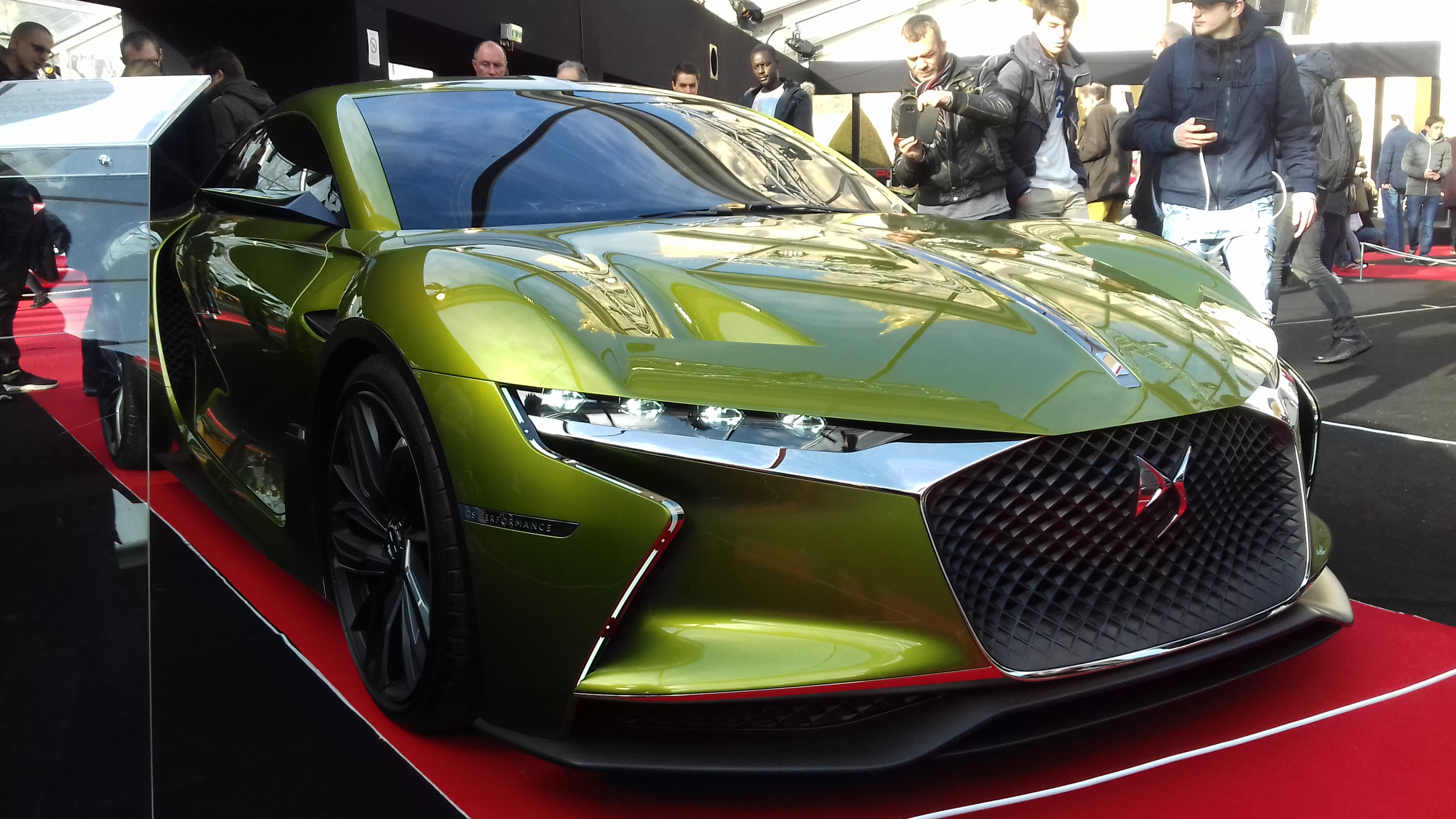
- DS E-Tense at the 2017 International Motor Festival

Overview
- Manufacturer: DS
- Production: 2016 (E-Tense); 2022 (E-Tense Performance)
- Designer: DS Design Studio Paris

Body and chassis
- Class: Concept car (S)
- Body style: 2-door coupe
- Layout: Rear-motor, four-wheel-drive

Powertrain
- Electric motor: 2x DS E-Tense electric motors
- Transmission: 3-speed automatic transmission
- Battery: lithium ion developed by TotalEnergies and Saft

Dimensions
- Wheelbase: 2,558 mm (100.7 in)
- Length: 4,720 mm (185.8 in)
- Width: 2,080 mm (81.9 in)
- Height: 1,290 mm (50.8 in)
- Curb weight: 1,800 kg (3,968 lb)

The DS E-Tense is a coupé concept unveiled by DS Automobiles on 26 February 2016 and shown to the public at the Geneva Motor Show of the same year. It is fully electric and develops 402 hp (300 kW).

An updated and improved model bearing the "Performance" moniker was introduced in 2022, with improvements to the drivetrain, electric motors and battery pack that increased the total output to 815 hp (608 kW). It was showcased at the 2022 Paris Motor Show in October 2022.

== Overview ==
=== E-Tense ===
The original was unveiled in 2016.

==== Media ====
It has appeared on both Asphalt 8: Airborne and Asphalt Legends (Formerly Asphalt 9: Legends) as a Class D vehicle.

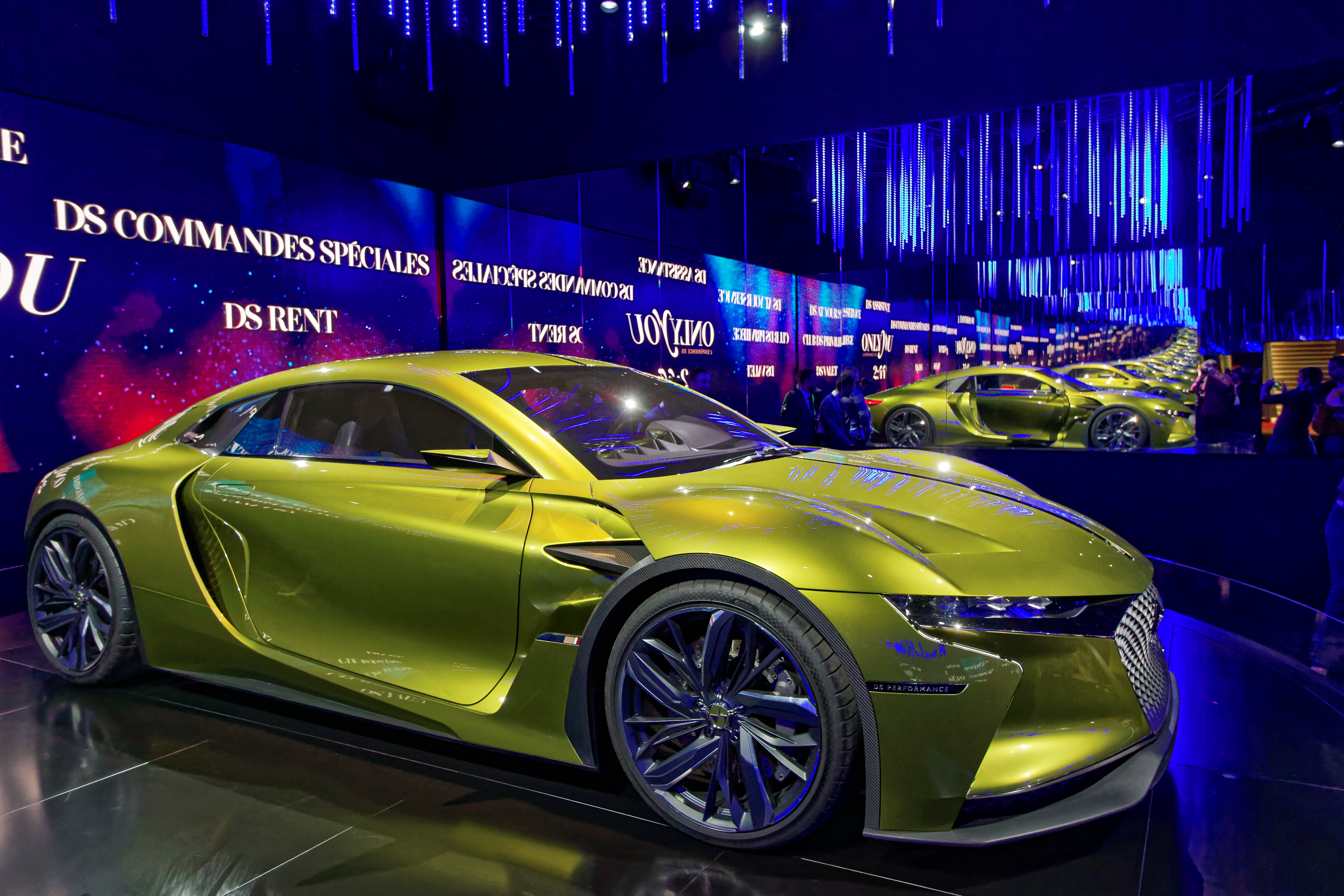
E-Tense at the 2016 Paris Motor Show

=== E-Tense Performance ===
The carbon body is based on the 2016 concept, onto which DS has grafted new front and rear ends that herald the styling and light signatures of its upcoming models.

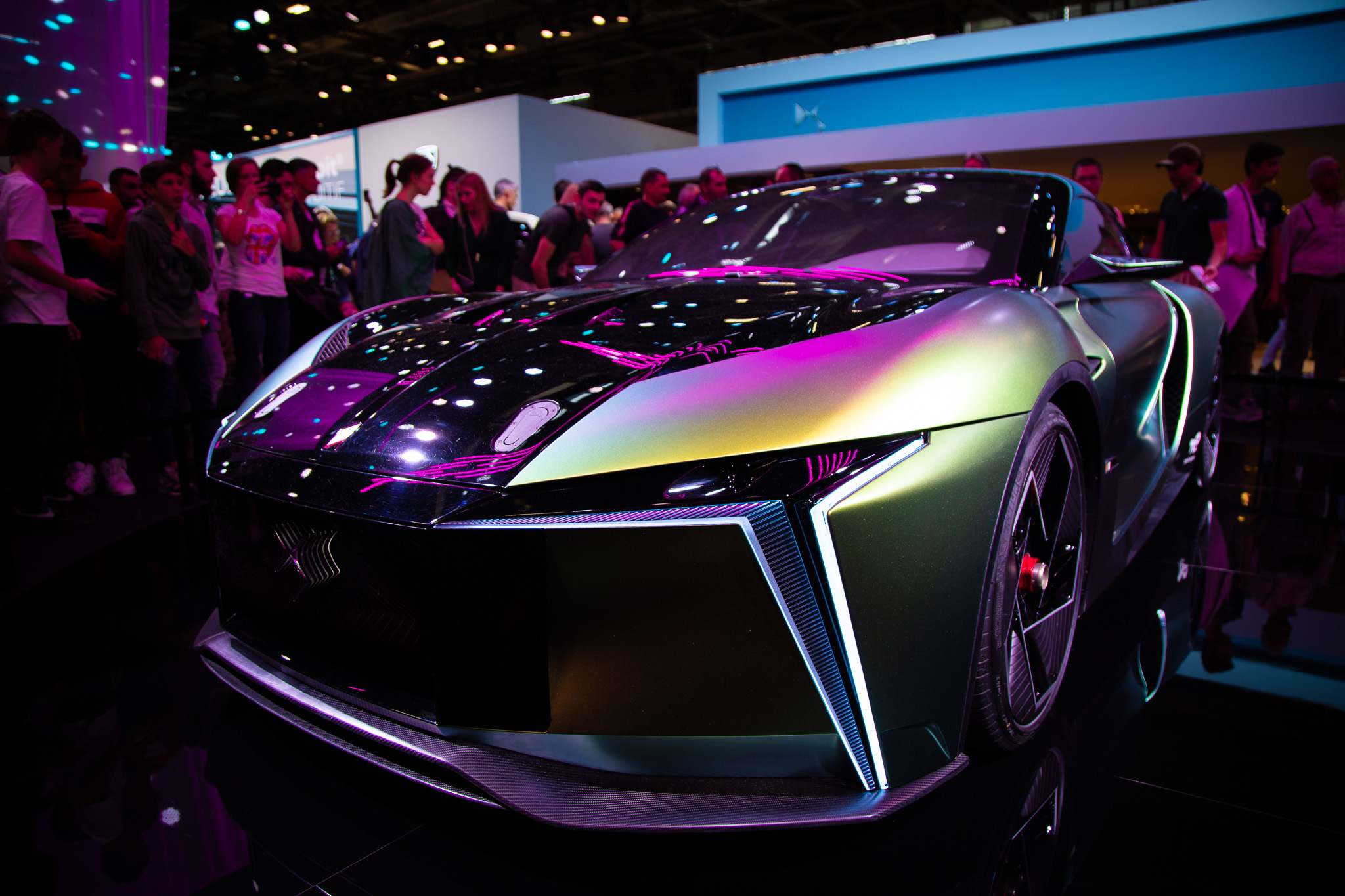
The E-Tense Performance at the 2022 Paris Motor Show
