= Silence S04 =

Two-seater electric vehicle by Acciona Mobility

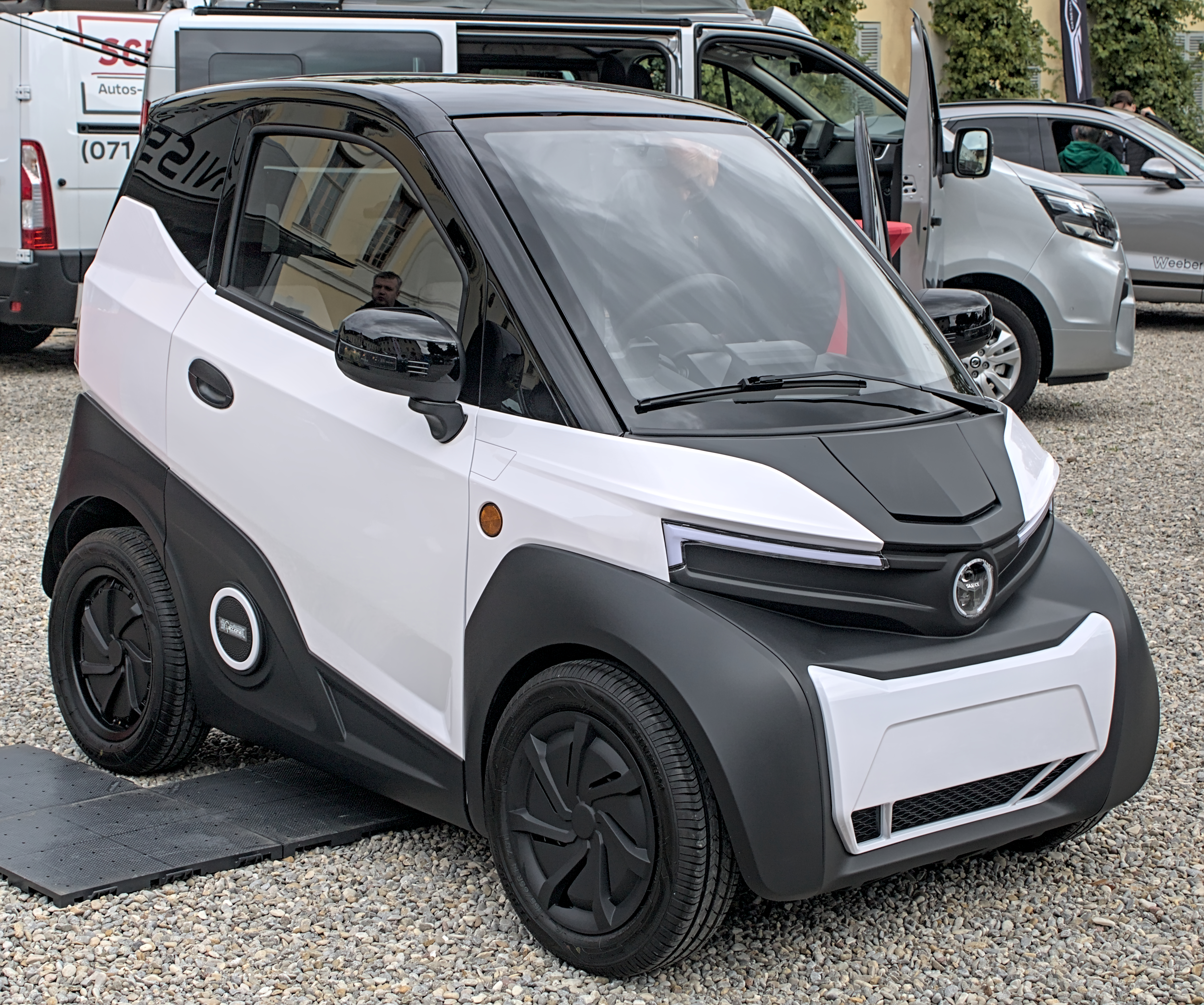

Overview
- Manufacturer: Acciona Mobility
- Production: 2022–present
- Assembly: Spain: Barcelona
- Designer: 4id Network's Design team

Body and chassis
- Class: Quadricycle
- Body style: 3-door hatchback
- Layout: Front-motor, front-wheel-drive

Powertrain
- Electric motor: Two hub motors (in the rear)
- Power output: 8 hp (6.0 kW); 19 hp (14 kW)
- Battery: 11 kWh lithium-ion
- Electric range: 150 km (93 mi)

Dimensions
- Length: 2,330 mm (92 in)
- Width: 1,560 mm (61 in)

The Silence S04 is a battery electric quadricycle produced by Acciona Mobility (formerly Scutum Logistic).

The Silence S04 can reach up to 85 km/h and uses portable trolley batteries, that allow for indoor charging or quick battery swapping.

== History ==
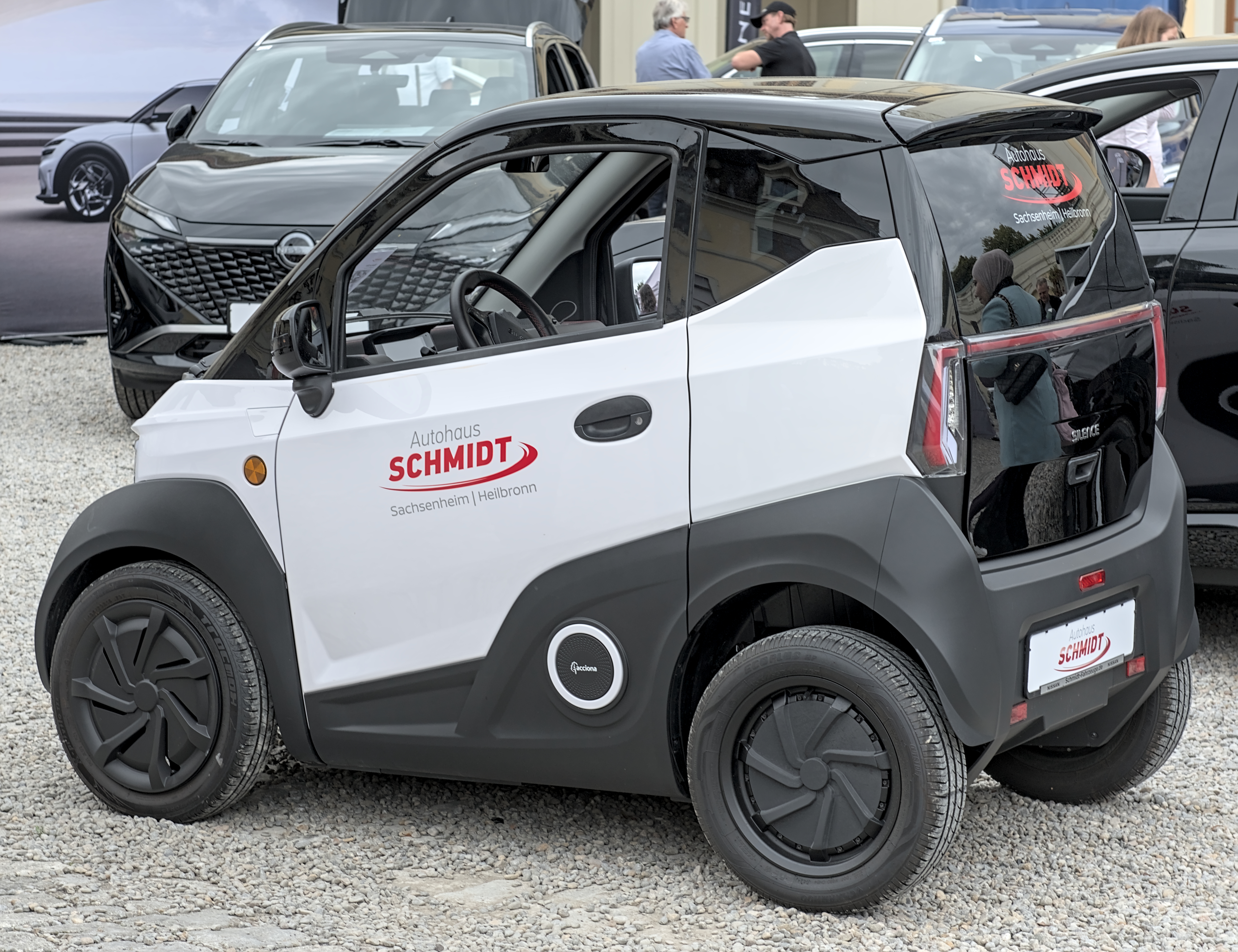
Rear view

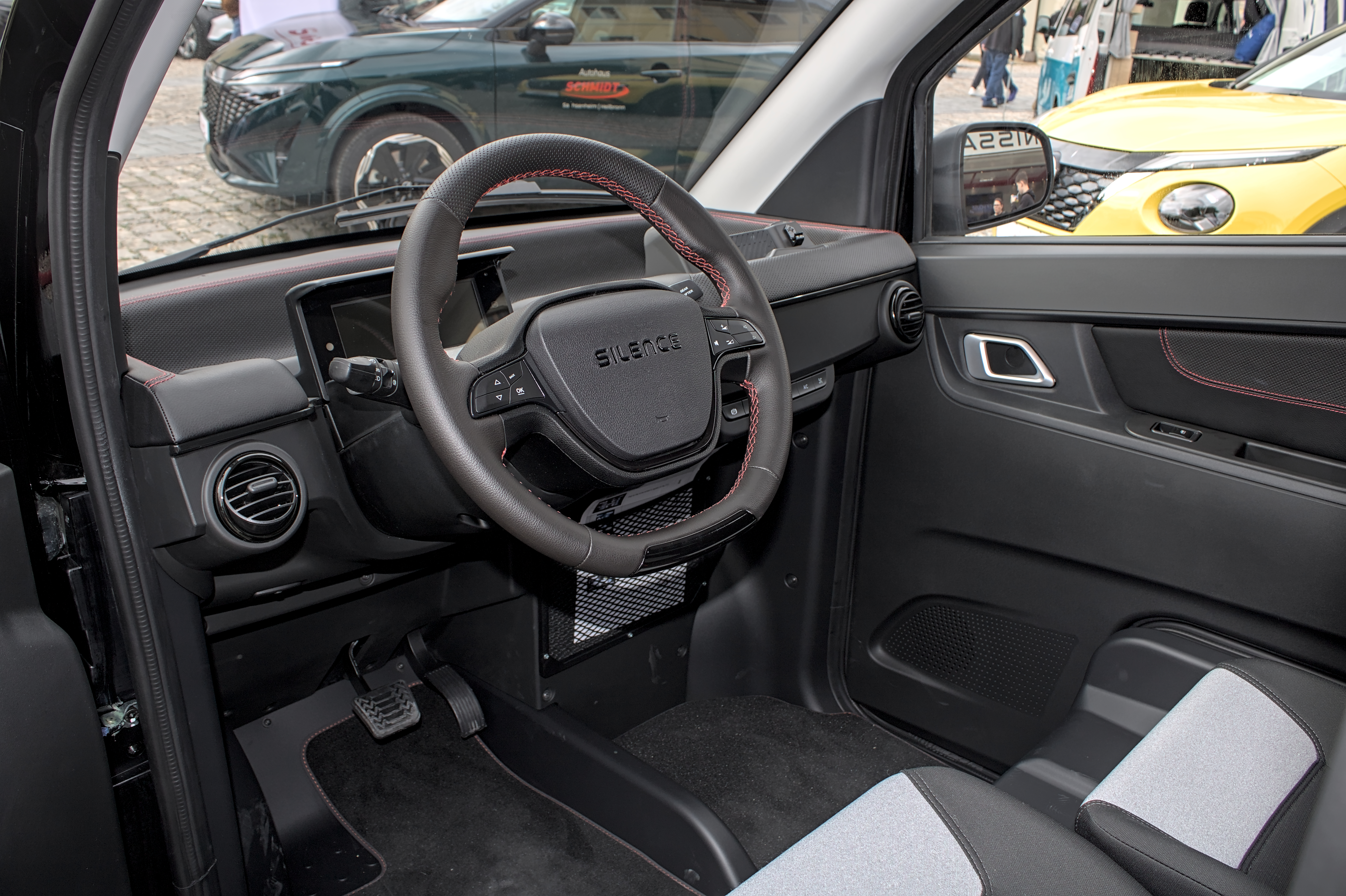
Interior

In October 2021, the Spanish electric vehicle manufacturer Silence announced its entry into the automotive industry by presenting its first microcar called the Silence S04. The vehicle was created as a response to competing vehicles from European manufacturers such as Citroën, Microlino, Opel and Renault.

The S04 took the form of a 2-door hatchback with a single-body silhouette richly decorated with two-tone accents with a lacquered and gray structure. Aggressively stylized headlights made entirely in LED technology have become a characteristic element. The manufacturer decided to develop a relatively spacious trunk in relation to the small external dimensions, which allows the driver to store up to 310 litres (11 ft^{3}) of luggage.

The start of sales of S04 was set for the beginning of 2022, with a starting price for the cheapest copy of €7,500. The basic vehicle can be purchased without a battery, and then visit the exchange stations by paying a subscription of €20 per month, always getting a charged battery.

== Speeds ==
The Silence S04 is available in two variants based on battery configuration and performance. The low-speed version (class L6e) produces 6.0 kW (8.0 hp) with a top speed of 45 km/h, while the more powerful version (class L7e) delivers 14 kW (19 hp) and reaches a top speed of 85 km/h.

== Batteries ==
The vehicle features a modular power system utilizing 5.6 kWh removable trolley-style batteries that allow for convenient domestic indoor charging, oudoor charging or quick battery swapping.

When equipped with a dual-battery configuration (11.2 kWh total capacity), both modules must be balanced with similar charge levels to operate, as the vehicle's battery management system (BMS) discharges them simultaneously in parallel to ensure balanced cell degradation. In this dual setup, the vehicle achieves its maximum operational range; the L6e variant can travel up to 175 km on a single charge, whereas the more powerful L7e variant achieves a range of up to 149 km.

Alternatively, the vehicle can bypass the dual-balancing requirement, by running autonomously on a single active 5.6 kWh battery pack at reduced performance levels. In this single-battery setup, the L6e variant achieves a range of up to 75 km, while maintaining its standard 45 km/h top speed; whereas the L7e variant sees its performance electronically capped at a top speed of 70 km/h with an estimated range of 70 to 75 km.

For domestic charging, both the vehicle and the individual battery packs are equipped with a male IEC 60320 C14 inlet, allowing users to charge via a standard household Schuko plug using an integrated 600 W convection-cooled charger.

Public infrastructure charging at street-side stations is supported through an official adapter cable that bridges the vehicle's IEC inlet to a standard Type 2 connector, enabling compatibility with conventional AC public charging points.
