= Devalliet Mugello =

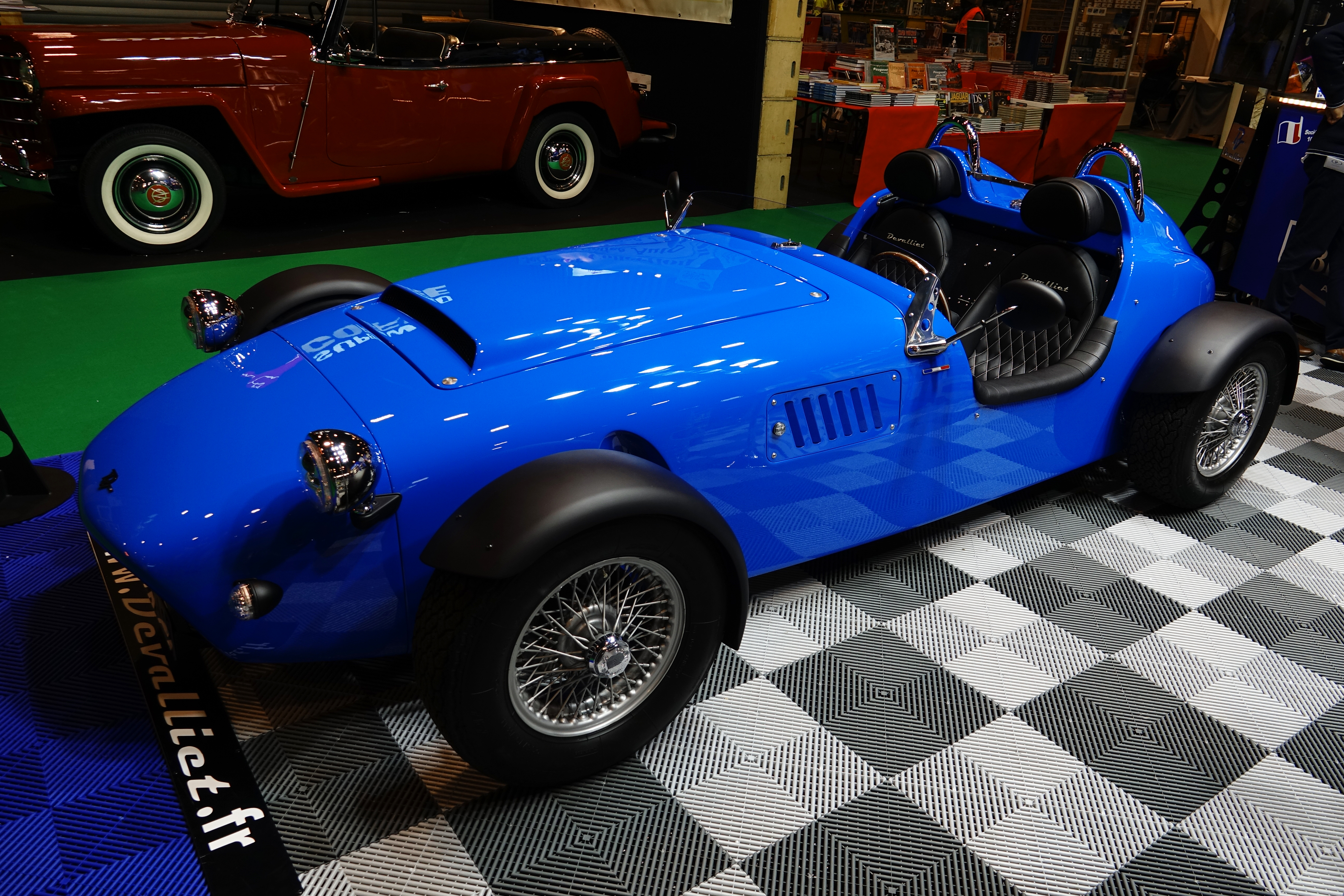

Overview
- Manufacturer: Devalliet
- Production: 2021–present
- Assembly: Tullins, France

Body and chassis
- Class: Sports car
- Body style: 2-door Roadster
- Layout: FR layout

Powertrain
- Engine: 1.2 THP (PSA EB2ADTX) I3 turbo petrol 1.6 L EP6FDT I4
- Power output: 130–225 PS (96–165 kW; 128–222 hp)
- Transmission: 5-speed manual 6-speed manual

The Devalliet Mugello is a roadster manufactured by the French automobile manufacturer Devalliet produced since 2021 at the rate of fifteen copies per year. The Mugello is the first vehicle produced by the manufacturer founded by Hervé Valliet, director of a company specializing in the design and production of fine sheet metal for industry.

== Overview ==
The Mugello was presented at the Époqu'auto show in Lyon in November 2019. The Mugello is produced in the Devalliet workshops in Tullins in the Vercors regional park. The car is named after the Mugello Circuit located in the historic region of the same name northeast of Florence, Italy.

== Specifications ==
The 260 and 375 versions of the Mugello are fitted with Peugeot-sourced Puretech petrol engines, respectively powering the 208 GT for the 1.2-litre 3-cylinder and the 308 GTI for the 1.6-litre 4-cylinder.
