= Alpine Alpenglow =

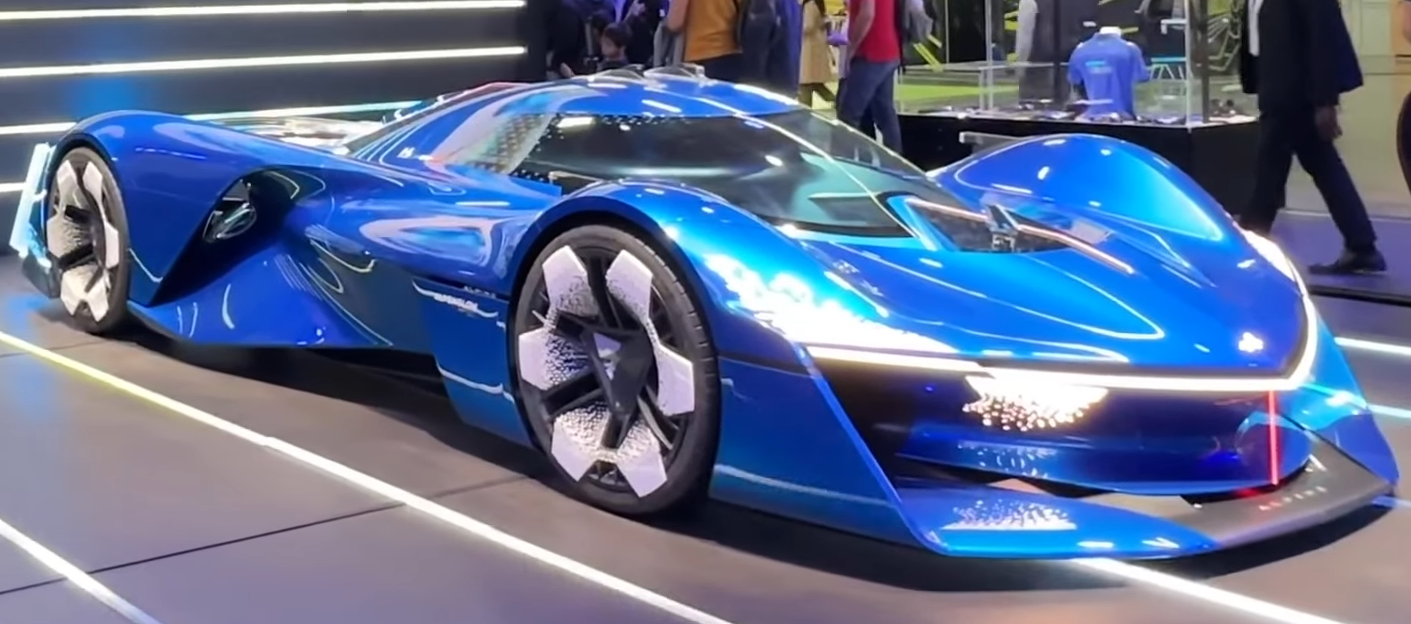
- The Alpine Alpenglow showcased at the 2022 Paris Motor Show

Overview
- Manufacturer: Automobiles Alpine
- Production: 2022 (concept car)
- Assembly: France: Dieppe (Seine-Maritime)
- Designer: Antony Villain (Design Director); Raphaël Linari (Chief Designer); Patrice Minol, Marc Poulain, Luca Baumann (exterior); Adrien Acquitter, Laurent Negroni, Romane Neuville (interior)

Body and chassis
- Body style: Single-seater coupé
- Layout: Rear mid-engine, rear-wheel-drive

Powertrain
- Engine: 2.0 L turbocharged I4 (Hy4); 3.5 L turbocharged V6 (Hy6)
- Power output: 340 PS; 340 hp (250 kW) (Hy4); 740 PS; 730 hp (544 kW) (Hy6)

Dimensions
- Length: 5,210 mm (205.1 in)
- Width: 2,140 mm (84.3 in)
- Height: 1,020 mm (40.2 in)

The Alpine Alpenglow (French pronunciation: [alpin alpɛnglo]) is a hydrogen-powered concept car from French automaker Alpine, unveiled in October 2022.

== Overview ==
=== Presentation ===
The Alpenglow was announced by Alpine on October 13, 2022 at 9 a.m. through an image on the web. It was then presented on 17 October at the 2022 Paris Motor Show.

An updated fully-functional version of the Alpenglow, now named the Alpenglow Hy4, was unveiled on 13 May 2024 at the 2024 6 Hours of Spa-Francorchamps; it is described by Alpine as a "rolling lab designed as a racing car". The car is expected to make a number of demo runs at the 2024 24 Hours of Le Mans.

A significantly more powerful variant with a larger V6 engine, appropriately named "Alpenglow Hy6", was later revealed on 14 October 2024.

Alpenglow hydrogen-powered hypercar that made its UK debut at the 2025 Goodwood Festival of Speed, featuring a 3.5-litre twin-turbocharged V6 engine producing 740bhp and showcasing Alpine's commitment to sustainable and high-performance automotive technology.

=== Powertrains ===
The Alpenglow burns hydrogen as fuel in conventional internal combustion engines. The hydrogen is stored on 3 separate pressurized tanks, each holding 2.1Kg of the gas.

The Alpenglow Hy4 is powered by a 2.0 L turbocharged I4 developing 340 hp. The Alpenglow Hy6 is powered by a 3.5 L twin-turbochaged V6 delivering 740 hp.

Both send power to the rear wheels through a 6-speed sequential transmission.

=== Gallery ===
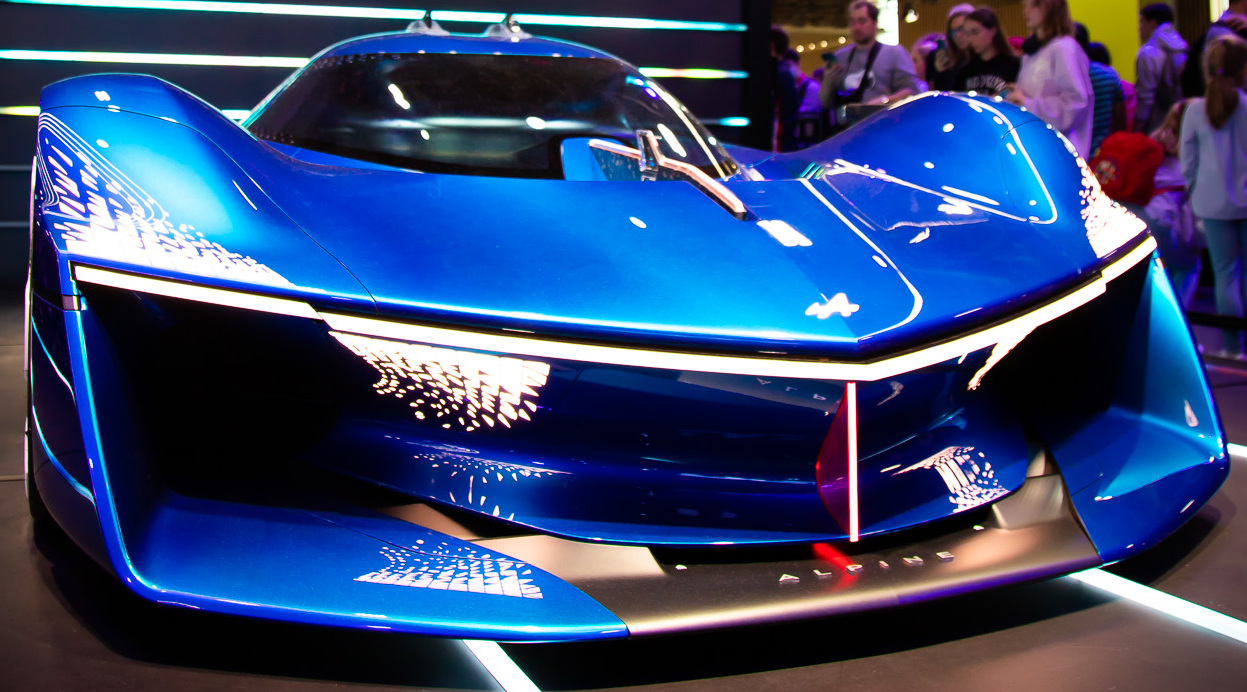
Front view

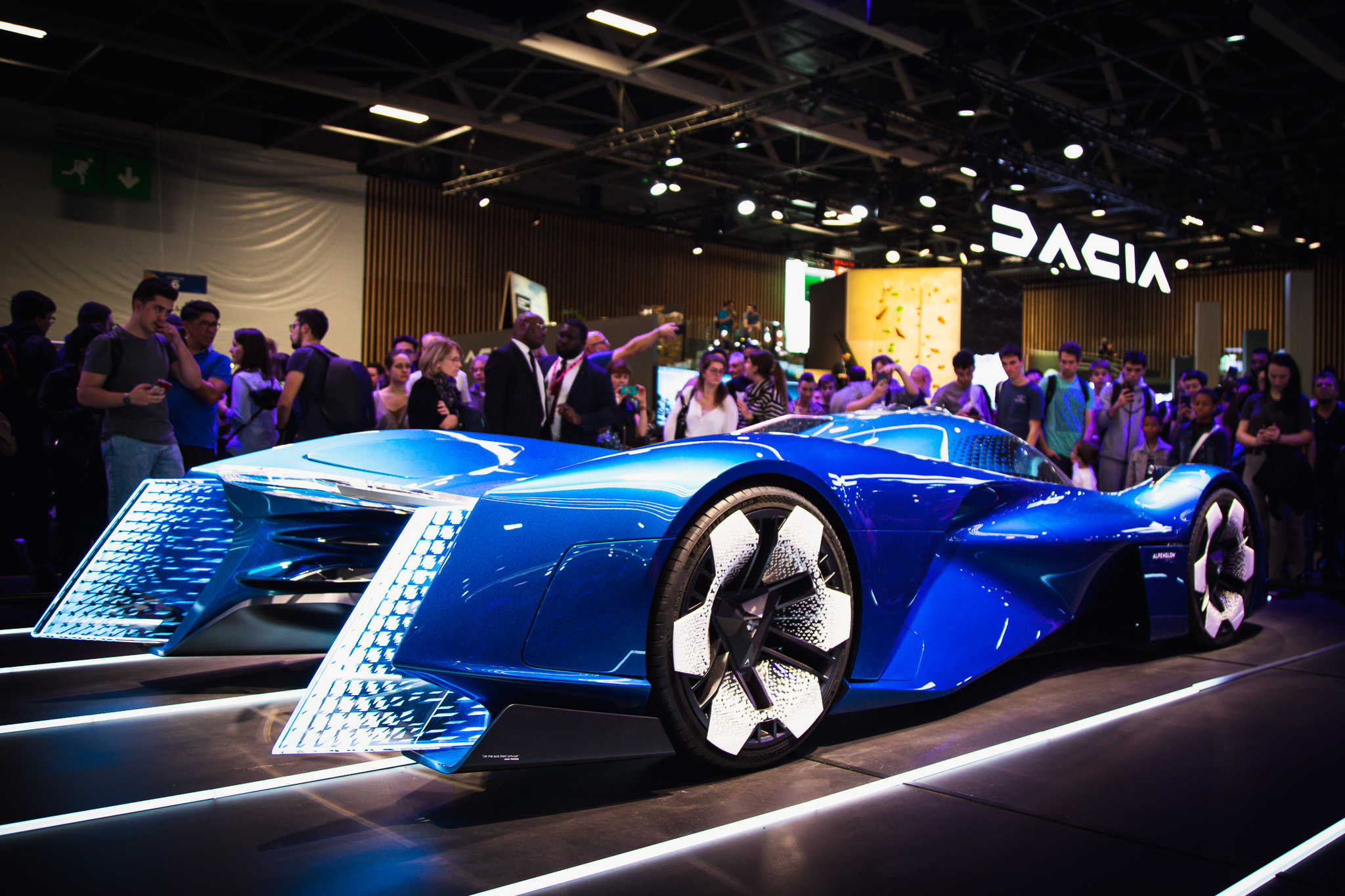
Rear view

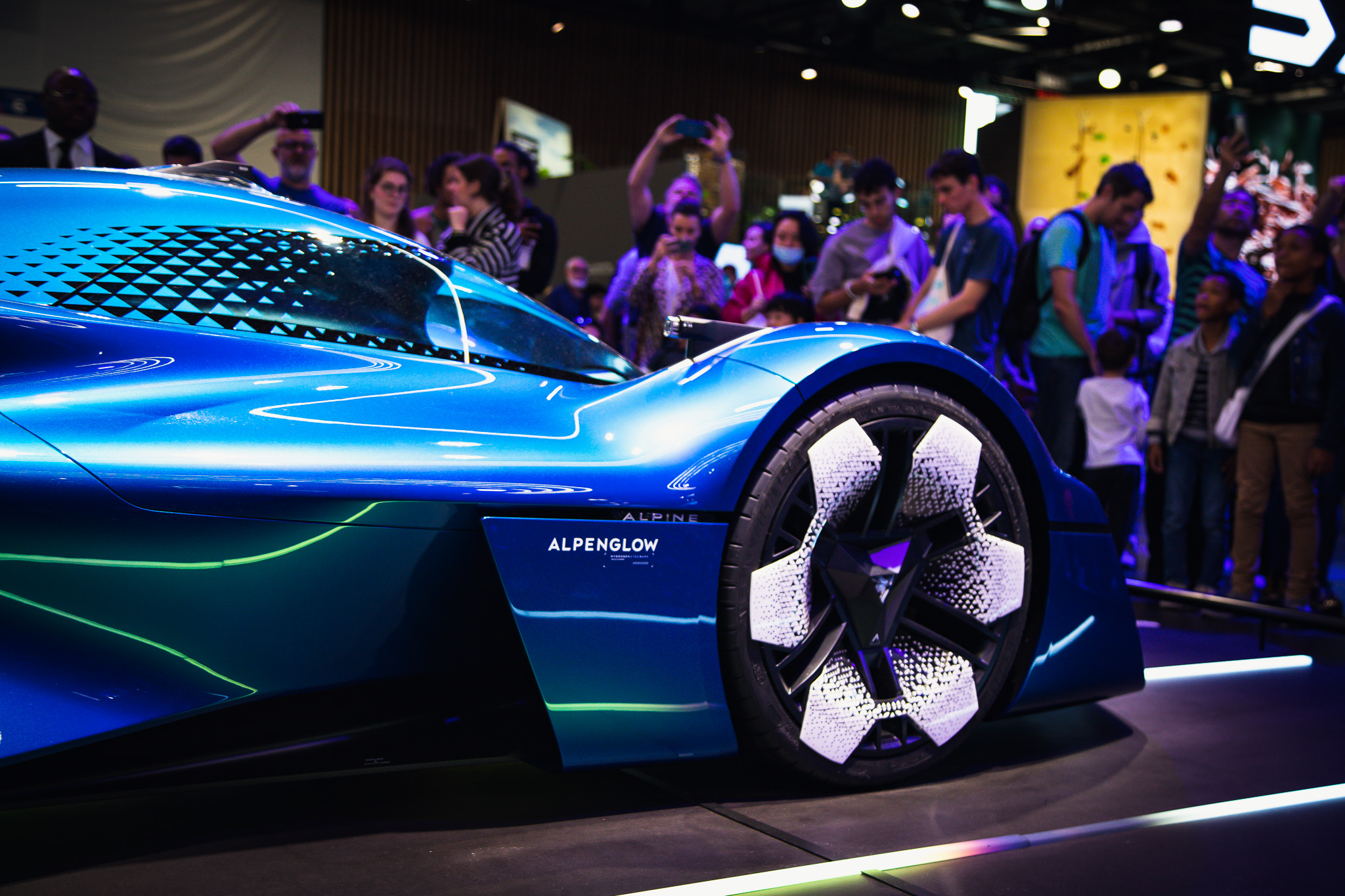
Wheel view
