= Genty Akylone =

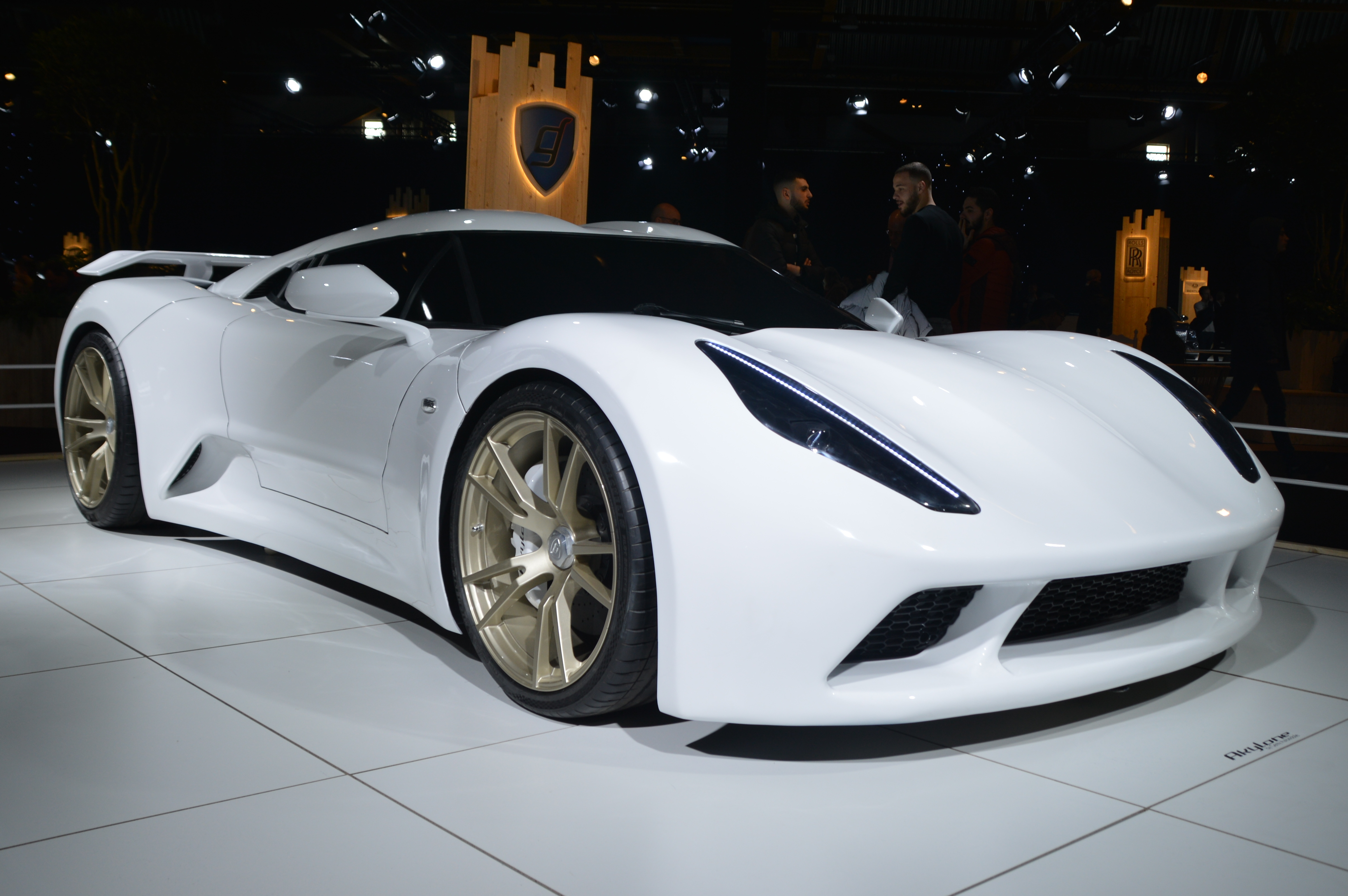

Overview
- Manufacturer: Genty Automobile
- Production: 2015 (concept car); 2017–present (25 produced: 15 coupés and 10 roadsters)

Body and chassis
- Class: Sports car (S)
- Body style: 2-door coupé; 2-door roadster
- Layout: Rear mid-engine, rear-wheel-drive
- Doors: Scissor

Powertrain
- Engine: 6.0L Chevrolet twin turbo V8 (2015); 5.2L Alpha Lamborghini twin turbo V10 (prototype)
- Transmission: 6-speed sequential + 1-reverse gear, limited slip differential

Dimensions
- Wheelbase: 2,780 mm (109.4 in)
- Length: 4,489 mm (176.7 in)
- Width: 2,050 mm (80.7 in)
- Height: 1,180 mm (46.5 in)
- Kerb weight: 1,480 kg (3,263 lb)

The Genty Akylone is a sports car developed by the French automobile manufacturer Genty Automobile. The vehicle, limited to 15 coupés and 10 roadsters, has been built in Saint-Pourçain-sur-Sioule since 2017; development of the car started in 2011.

== In popular culture ==
The car appears in Asphalt Legends as a high-end Class A car and in Asphalt 8: Airborne as a high-end Class B car. The car also appears in The Crew Motorfest as a Hypercar.

== Gallery ==
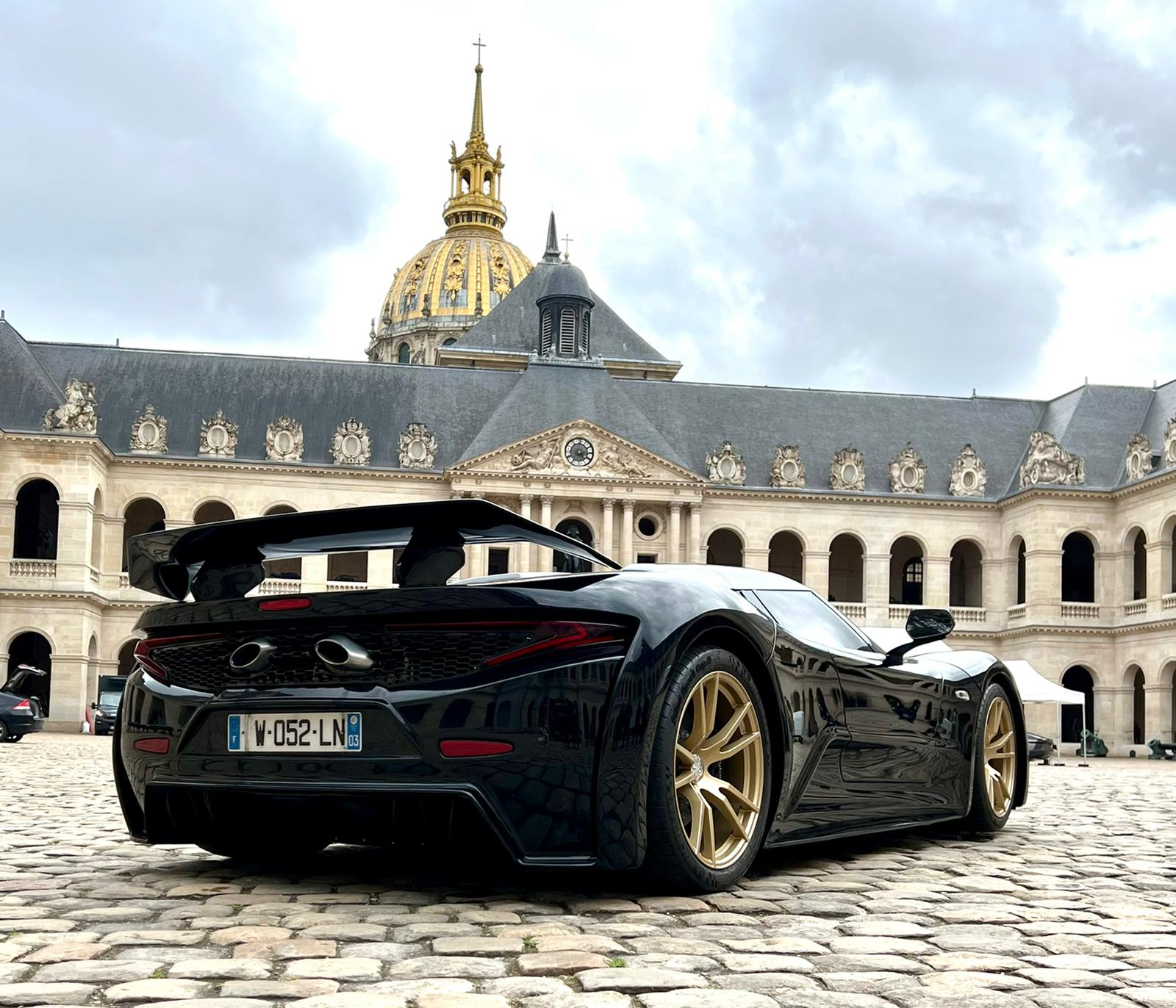
Rear view

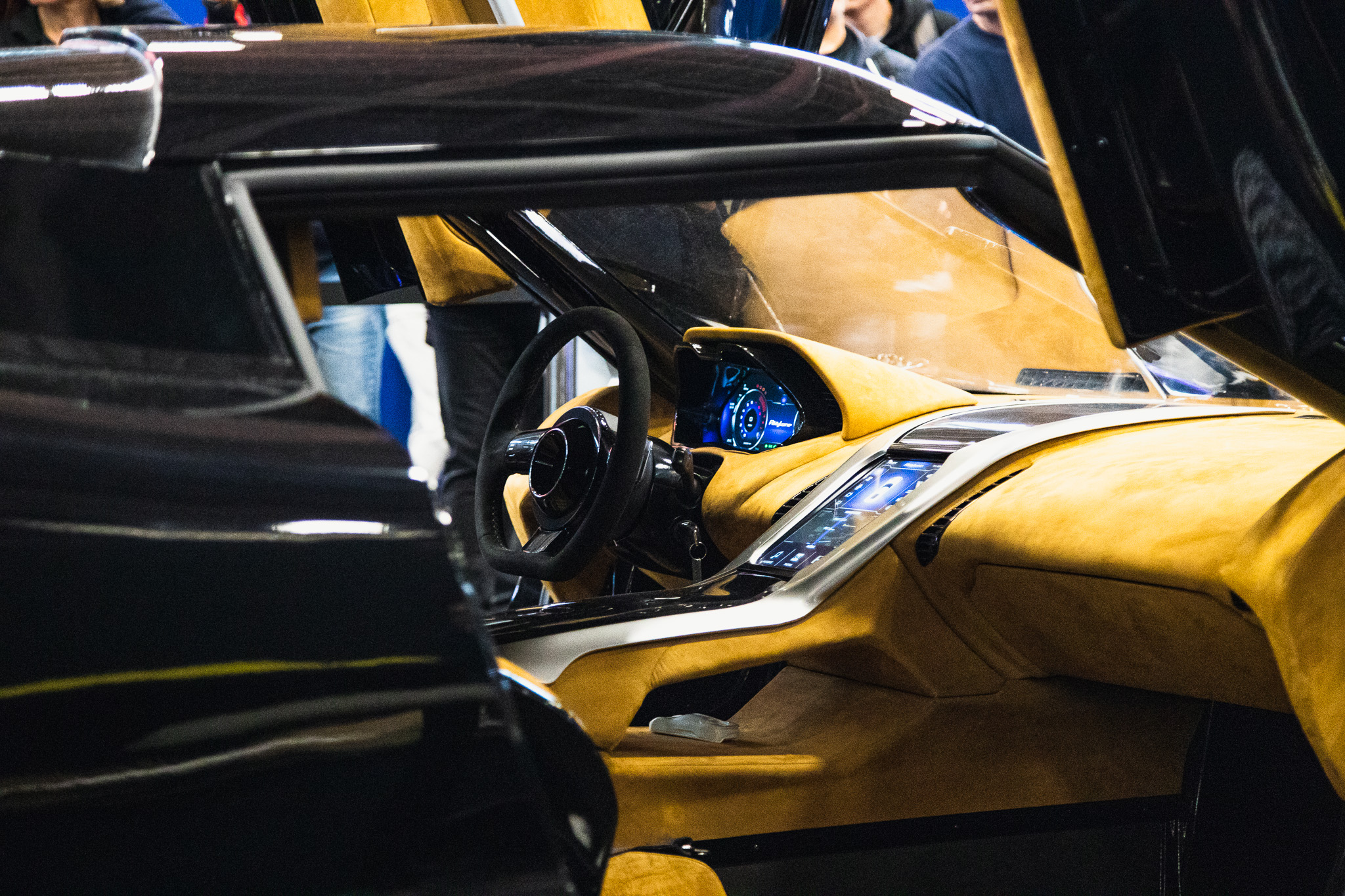
Interior
