= Zacua =

Mexican car company

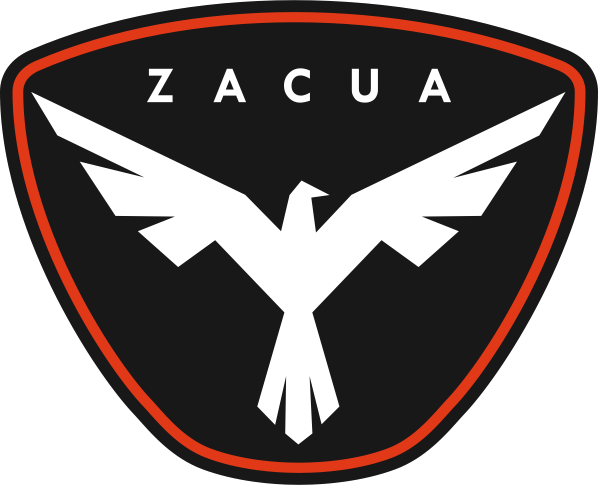
- Industry: Automotive
- Founded: 2017; 9 years ago
- Founder: Jorge Martínez Ramos
- Headquarters: Mexico City, Mexico
- Key people: Jorge Martínez Ramos (chairman); Nazareth Black (CEO)

Zacua México is a brand of electric city cars based in Mexico City. It was founded in 2017 and is considered the first Mexican company to develop, produce, and commercialize an electric vehicle assembled entirely in the country.

Zacua operates under the corporate name Motores Limpios, S.A.P.I. de C.V., a subsidiary of the group COPEMSA (Compañía Operadora de Estacionamientos Mexicanos, S.A. de C.V.). The project was created with the aim of introducing electric vehicles into urban areas, linking automotive operations with charging infrastructure installed in parking facilities managed by the group.

== History ==
Zacua was founded in 2017, in Mexico City during an event held at the Hotel Presidente Intercontinental. During the launch, two electric models were introduced: a coupé and a hatchback, which were later named the Zacua MX2 and Zacua MX3, respectively.

For their development, the company established a collaboration with the French manufacturer Automobiles Chatenet, which provided the platform of its internal combustion model, the CH30. This base was modified to integrate an electric powertrain.

Vehicle production began in April 2018 at a plant located in the Puebla 2000 Industrial Park, in the state of Puebla. According to official reports, the plant began operations with an investment of approximately 80 million Mexican pesos. Vehicles are assembled manually, and the production team is composed primarily of women. During its initial phase, the brand used 40% domestic components, with the goal of increasing that percentage in the future. Subsequently, a component substitution process was carried out, increasing local integration to 60%.

== Name and Logo ==
The name Zacua comes from the Nahuatl language and refers to the zacua mayor (Psarocolius montezuma), a bird species native to eastern Mexico, also known in English as the Montezuma oropendola. This bird is used as the company’s logo.

== Models ==
Zacua produces two main vehicle models:

- Zacua MX2: A two-seater coupé with a compact design.
- Zacua MX3: A two-seater hatchback variant with a different rear-end design.

Both vehicles are fully electric and assembled in Puebla, Mexico. Being electric, they are exempt from the vehicle restriction program Hoy No Circula in Mexico City.

== Structure and Management ==
The company is led by Jorge Martínez Ramos, founder and owner, and by Nazareth Black, who serves as the Chief Executive Officer (CEO). Both have been involved in the development and operation of the brand since its launch.
