= Weez =

Series of electric city cars

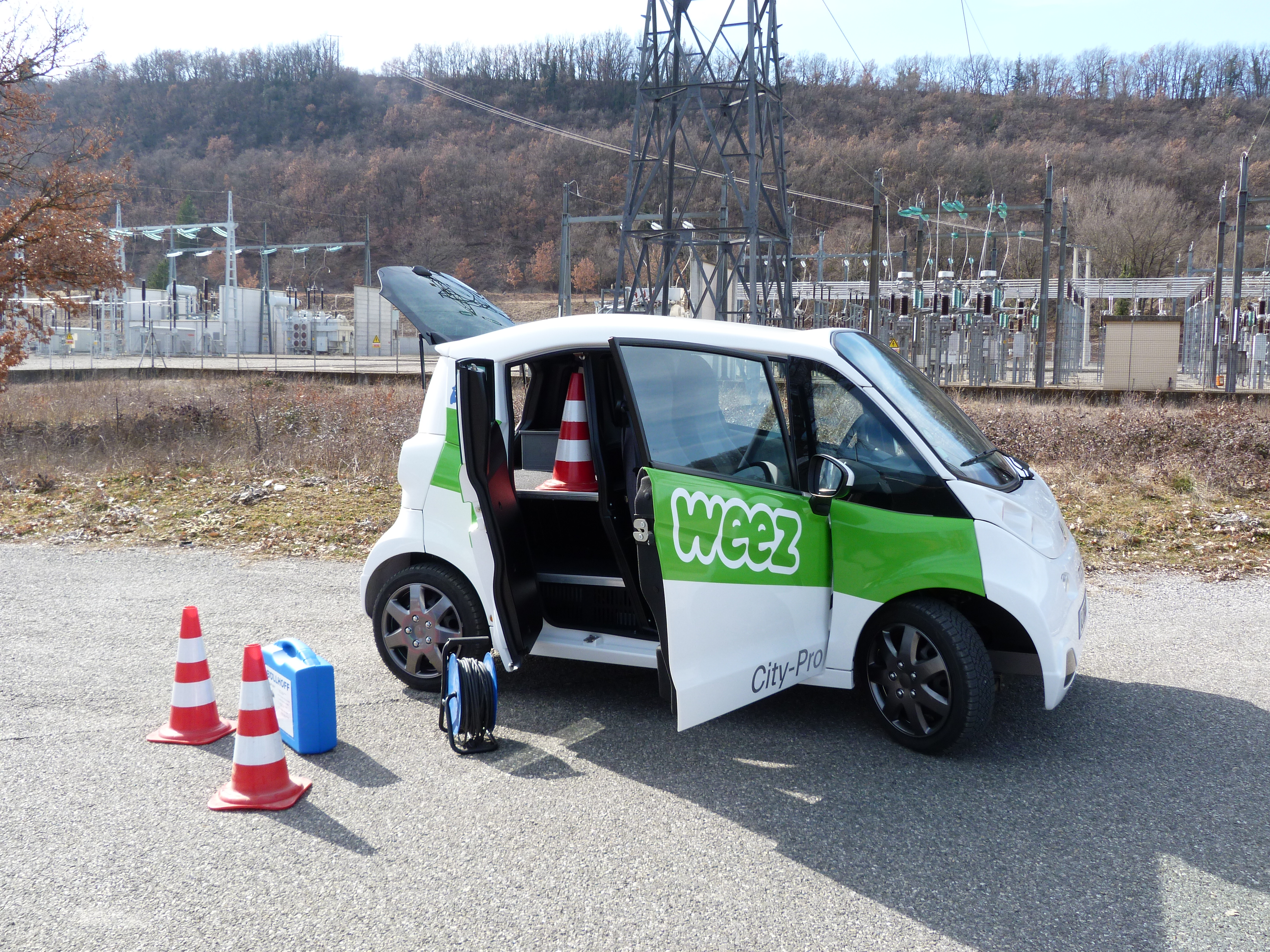

Overview
- Manufacturer: Eon Motors
- Production: 2023–present

Body and chassis
- Class: Quadricycle

Powertrain
- Electric motor: 1.5 kW
- Battery: 11.5 kWh Lithium iron phosphate

Dimensions
- Length: 3,000 mm (118.1 in)
- Width: 1,500 mm (59.1 in)
- Curb weight: 450 kg (992 lb)

The Weez is a range of low-cost electric cars produced by the French company Eon Motors that can be driven without a license, with three seats and a range of 100 km (62 mi).

== Overview ==
First shown as a concept at the 2012 Paris Motor Show, a second prototype was shown at the Paris Motor Show in October 2014, until they released their first production model in 2022, the Weez City-Pro.

== History ==
Eon Motors is a small French manufacturer based in Malijai in the Alpes-de-Haute-Provence, founded in 2010. After twelve years of development and in-house creation of the body, chassis and electronics, the first deliveries of the Weez City-Pro will take place in the first quarter of 2023, when 70 orders have already been placed, and production capacity will reach 300 units per year, or almost one per day. The company has 25 employees and is actively looking to recruit more, for a target of 3,000 units per year within five years, across all models.

They plan to release several models, all based on the Weez City-Pro, such as a two-seater more suitable for cargo transportation, soon to be completed by the Weez City-Duo, which will have a window between the front seats and the trunk, as well as only one interior mirror.
