= Automobiles Chatenet =

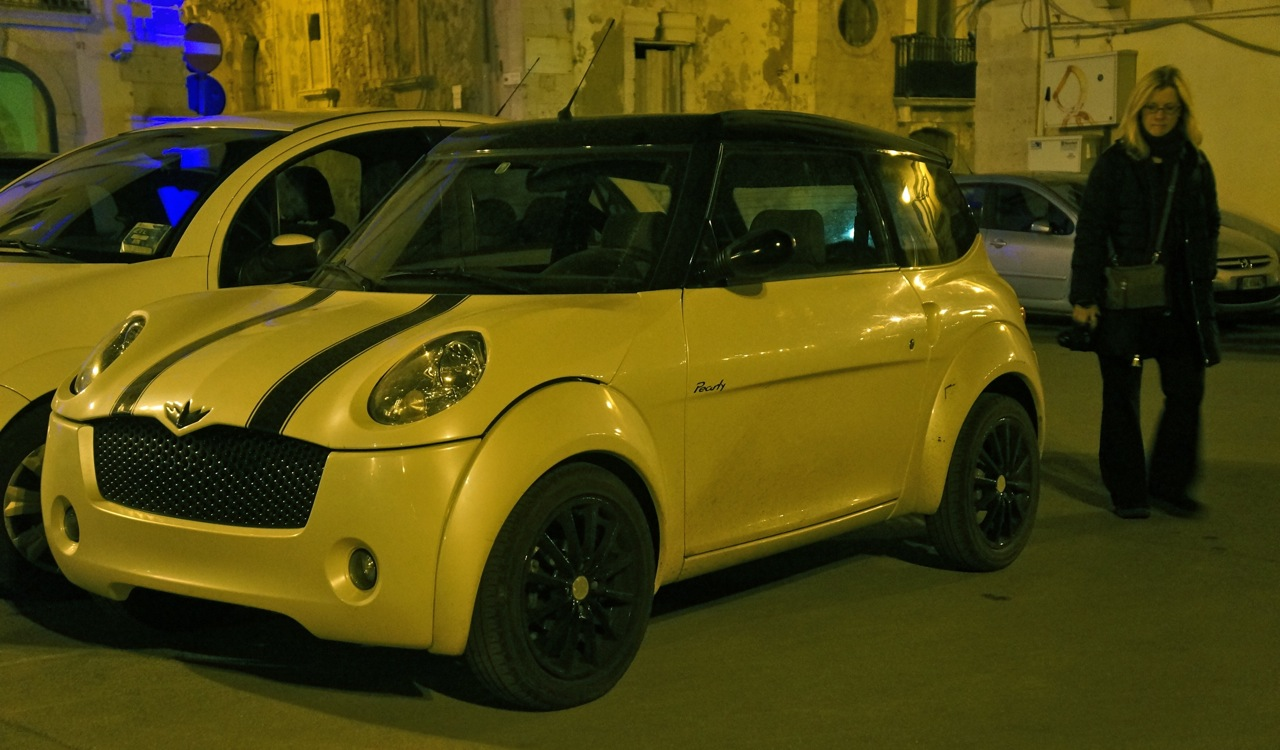
- Chatenet CH26 in Italy

Overview
- Manufacturer: Automobiles CHATENET
- Assembly: France

Body and chassis
- Class: Microcar
- Body style: two door coupe and convertible

Powertrain
- Engine: Diesel or Electric

Dimensions
- Length: 3.065 m (120.7 in)
- Width: 1.567 m (61.7 in)
- Height: 1.453 m (57.2 in)

Automobiles Chatenet is a manufacturer of microcars based in the Haute-Vienne department of France. The company was founded in 1984 by Louis-Georges Chatenet.

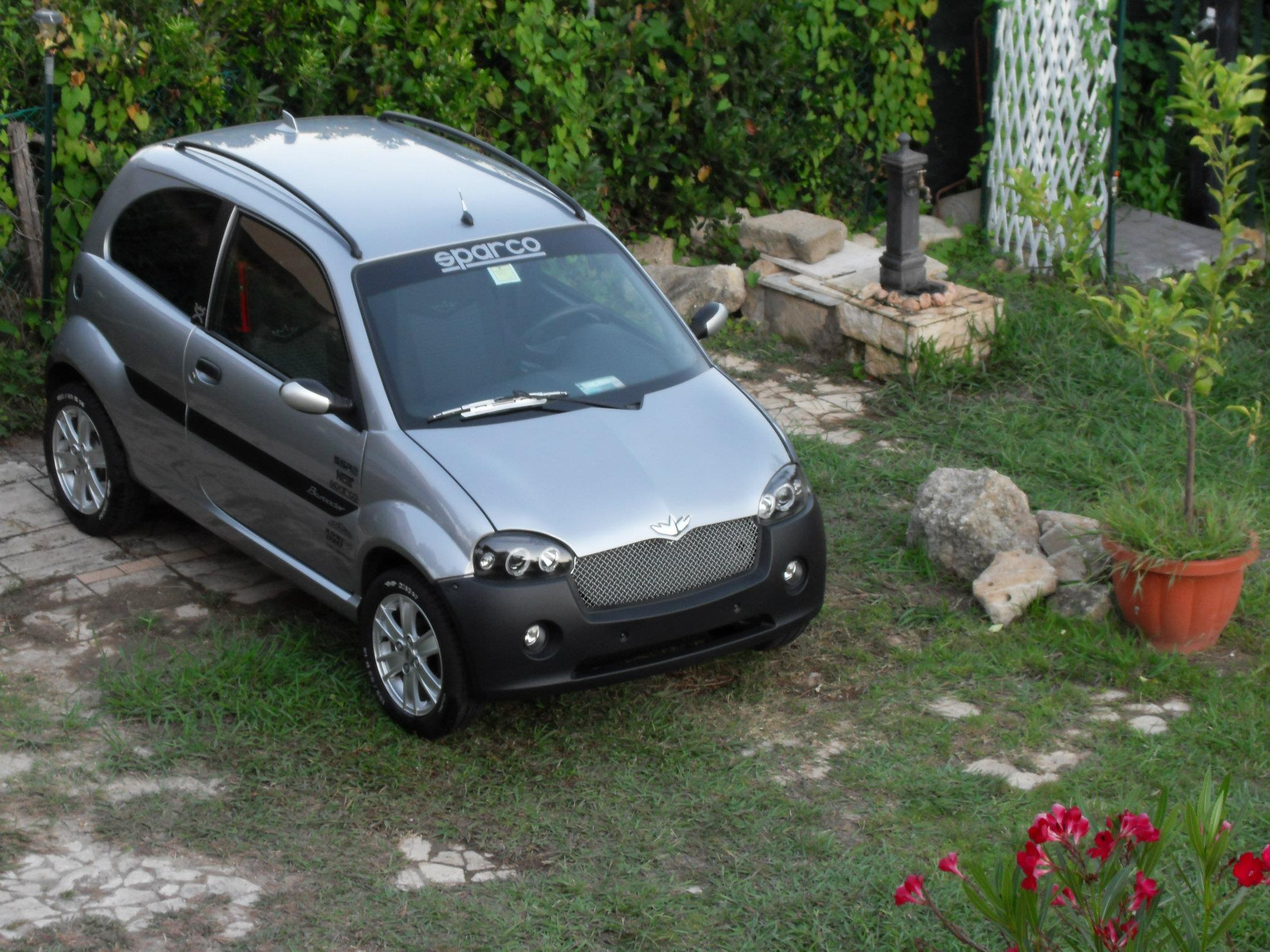
Chatenet barooder WX

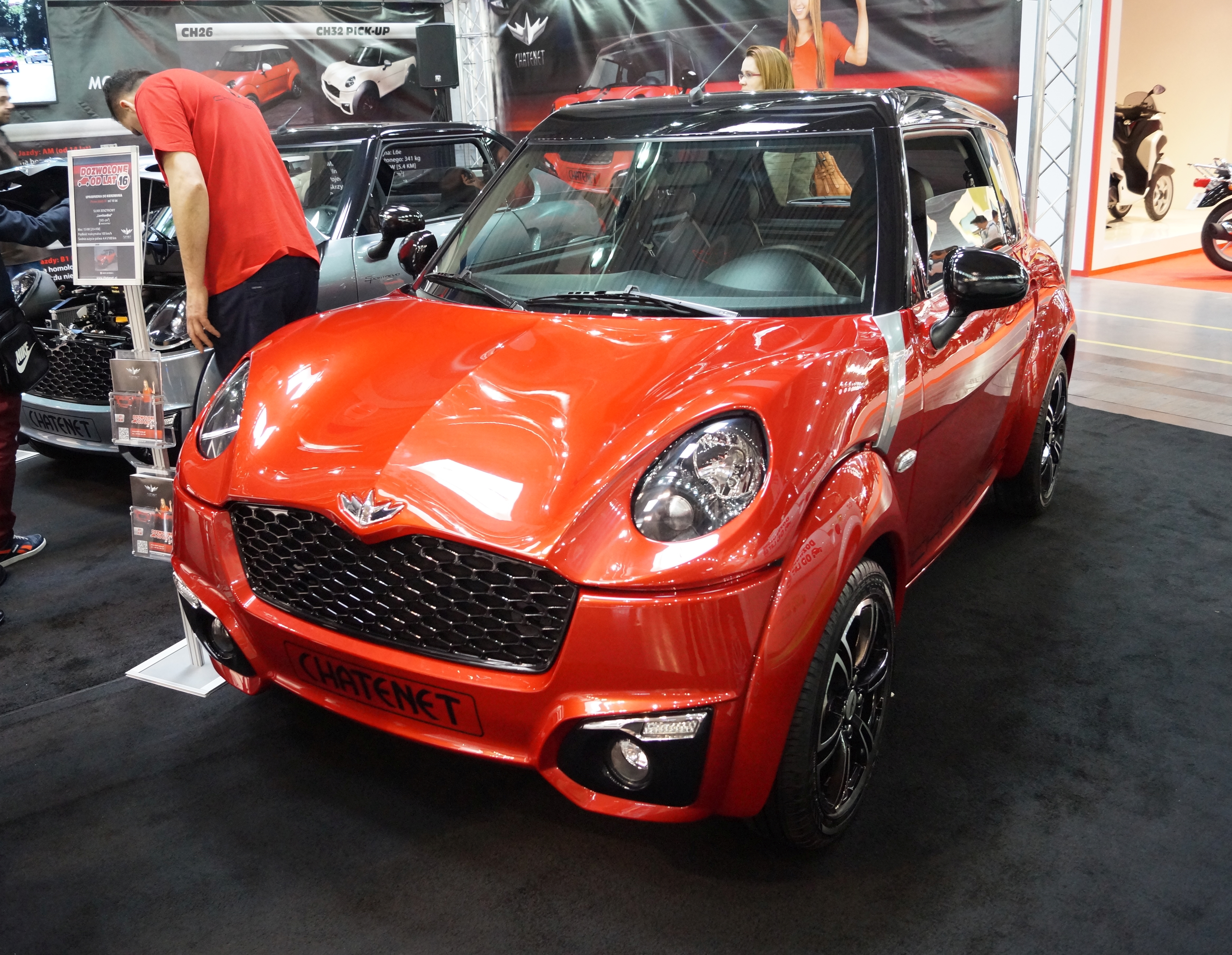
Chatenet CH30

== Models ==
- Stella
- Media
- Barooder
- Speedino
- CH26 v1
- CH26 v2
- CH32 Pick-Up
- CH28
- CH39 Sporteevo
- CH30
- CH32
- CH40
- CH46
- Chatelaine
