= Aixam City =

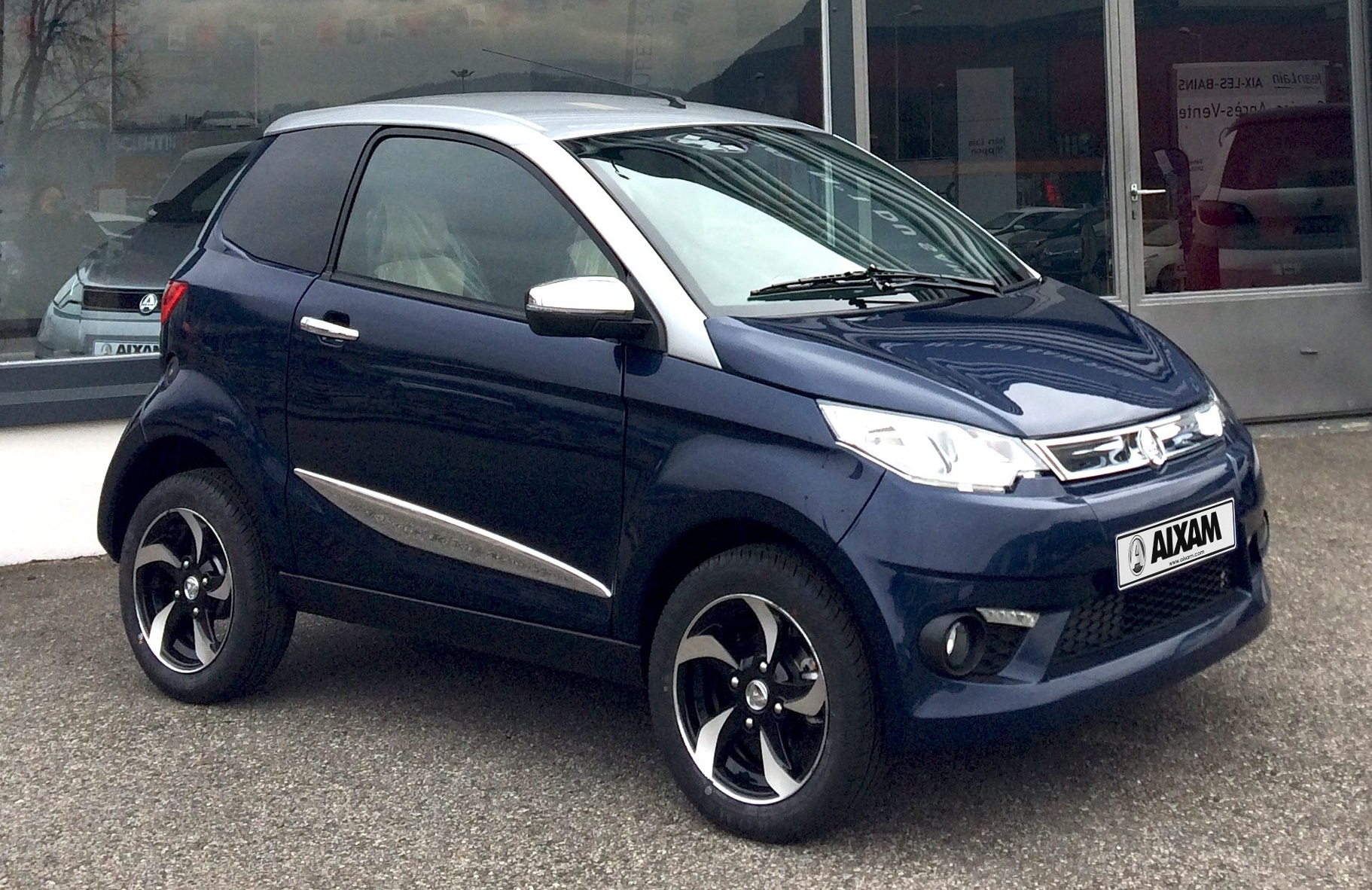
- 2017 Aixam City Premium

Overview
- Manufacturer: Aixam
- Also called: Aixam e-City; Aixam Mega City; Aixam Mega e-City; Aixam Coupé; Aixam e-Coupé; Aixam Crossline; Aixam Crossover; Aixam e-Crossover; Aixam Scouty / Scouty-R (convertible); Aixam Roadline
- Production: 2007–present
- Assembly: France: Aix-les-Bains

Body and chassis
- Class: Microcar
- Body style: 2-door hatchback
- Related: Mega e-Scouty

Dimensions
- Wheelbase: 1,795 mm (70.7 in)
- Length: 2,800 mm (110.2 in)
- Width: 1,500 mm (59.1 in)
- Height: 1,480 mm (58.3 in)
- Curb weight: 350 kg (772 lb)

The Aixam City is a microcar produced by the French manufacturer Aixam.

== Models ==
=== Mega e-City ===
Developed in collaboration with NICE, the electric Mega e-City was first shown at the 2006 British International Motor Show, and has been produced by Aixam since March 2007. Until the end of 2008, it was built exclusively for the London market as a right-hand drive vehicle. The maximum speed is 64 km/h (40 mph), with a range of 60–80 km (37–50 mi).

Since the end of 2010, the Mega e-City has also been available with a lithium-ion battery. Having the same top speed, the range was increased to 100 km (62 mi). The price of the model in Germany fell from €16,000 gross to less than €15,000 between 2010 and 2020.

Electric variants of the Aixam Pro commercial vehicle range are also available.

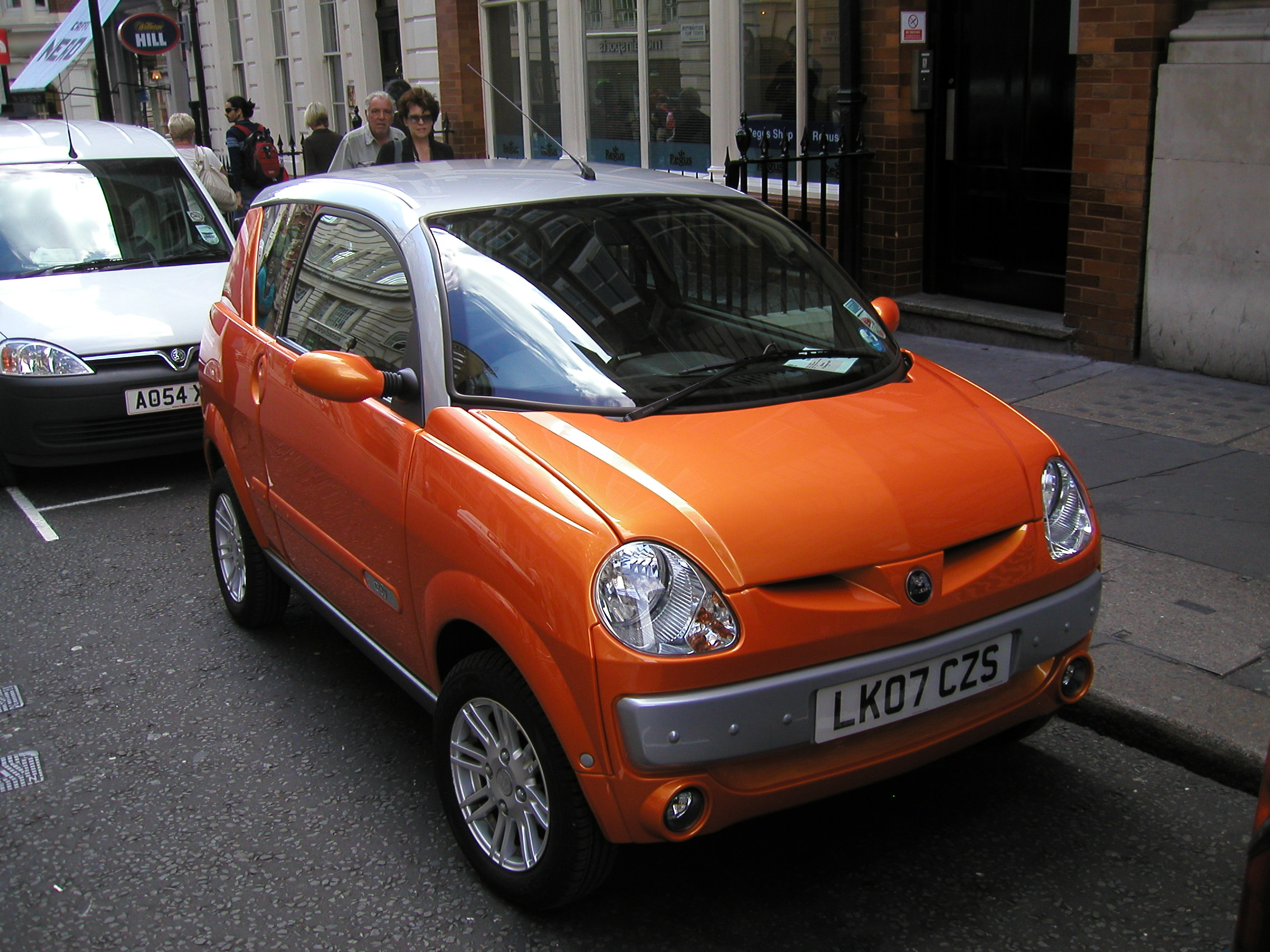
2007 Mega e-City in London

=== City GTO ===
A sportier-looking version, the Aixam City GTO, was added to the range.

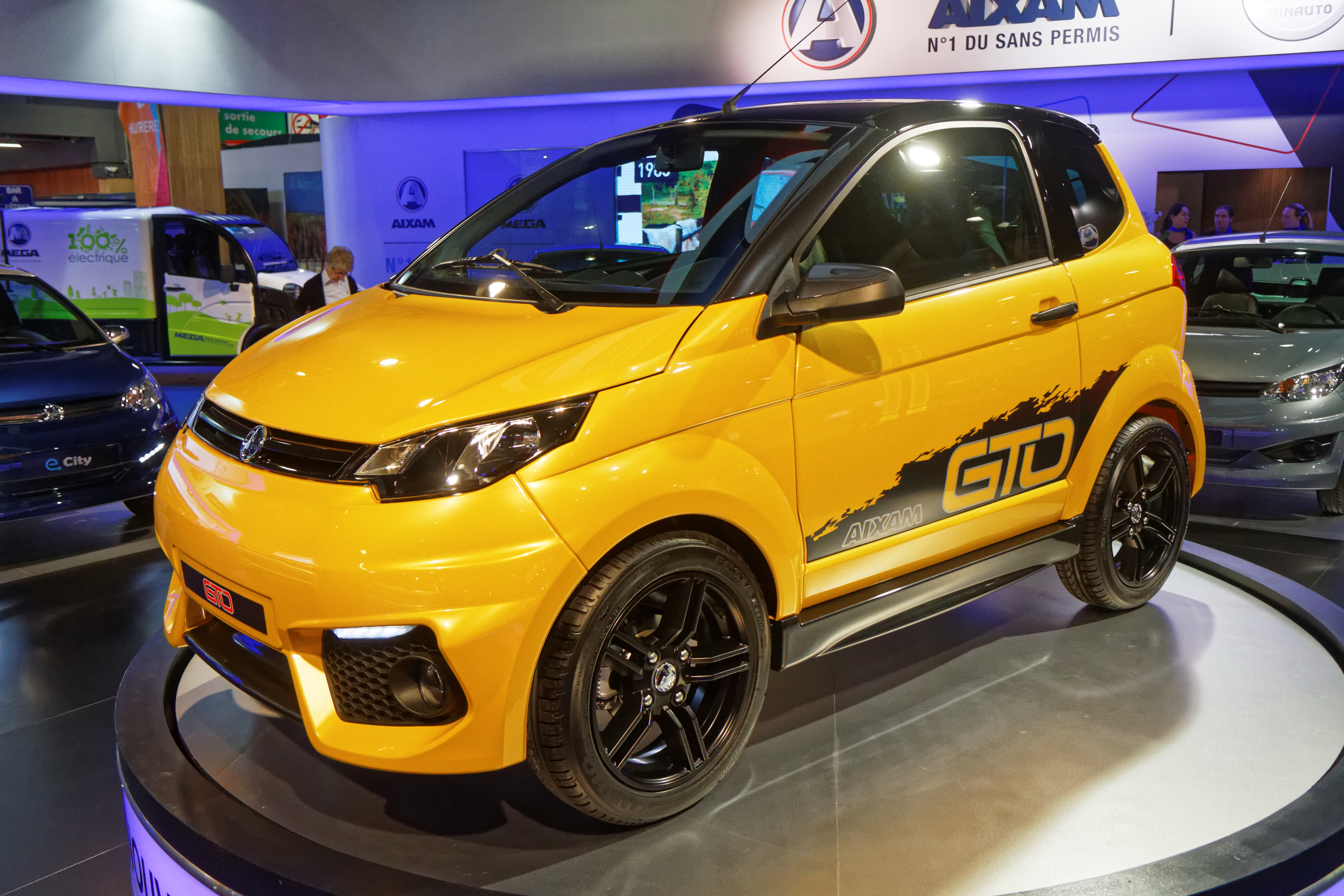
Aixam GTO presented at the 2014 Paris Motor Show

=== e-Coupé ===
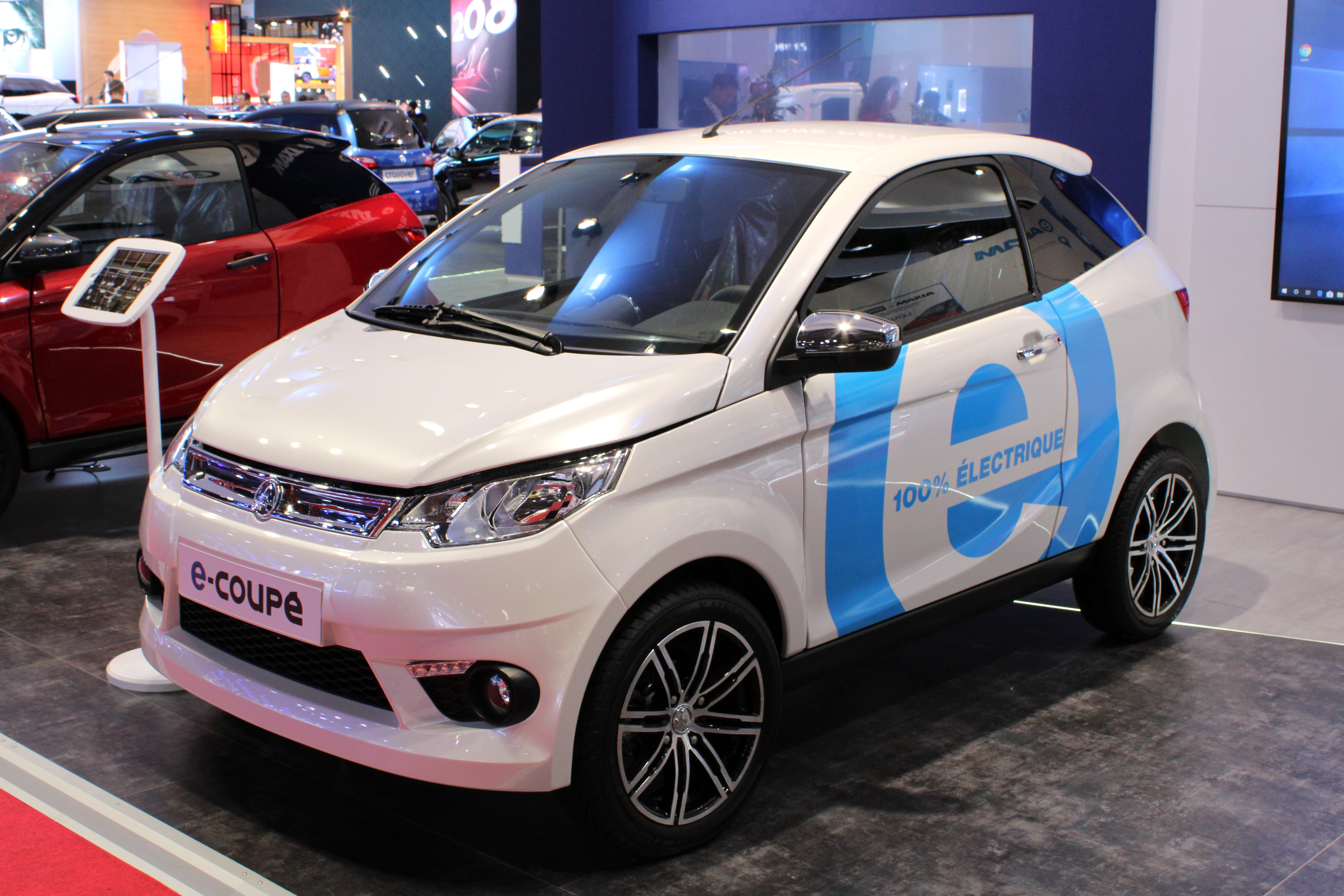
Aixam e-Coupé at the 2018 Paris Motor Show

The e-Coupé is the electric version of the Coupé, with a claimed range of 75 km (47 mi).

=== Crossline / Crossover ===
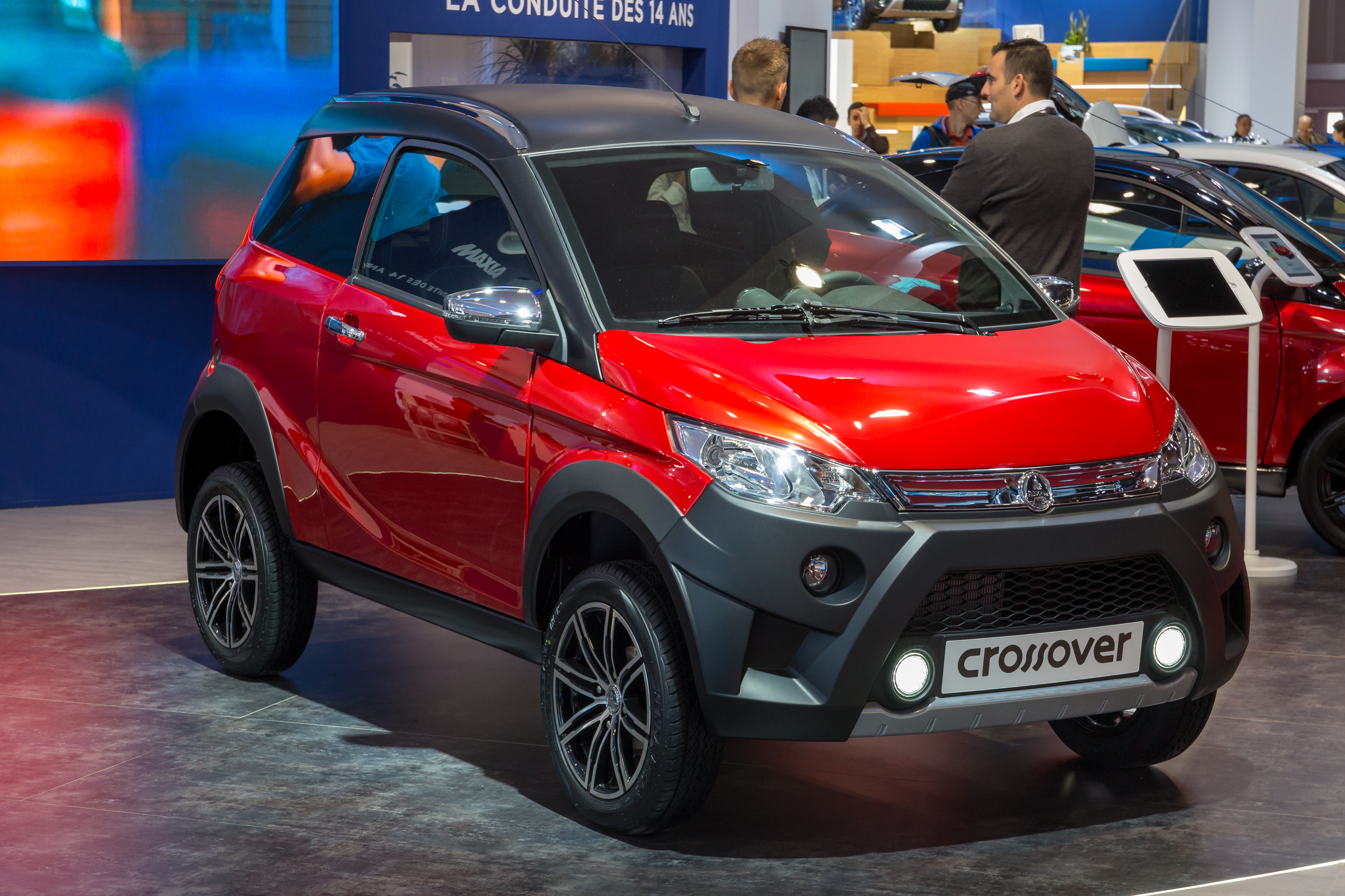
Aixam Crossover at the 2018 Paris Motor Show

The Crossline and Crossover are crossover-inspired versions of the City.

== Safety ==
The Aixam Crossover GTR was tested in 2016 by Euro NCAP and received a rating of 1 out of 5 stars.

== Mega e-Scouty ==
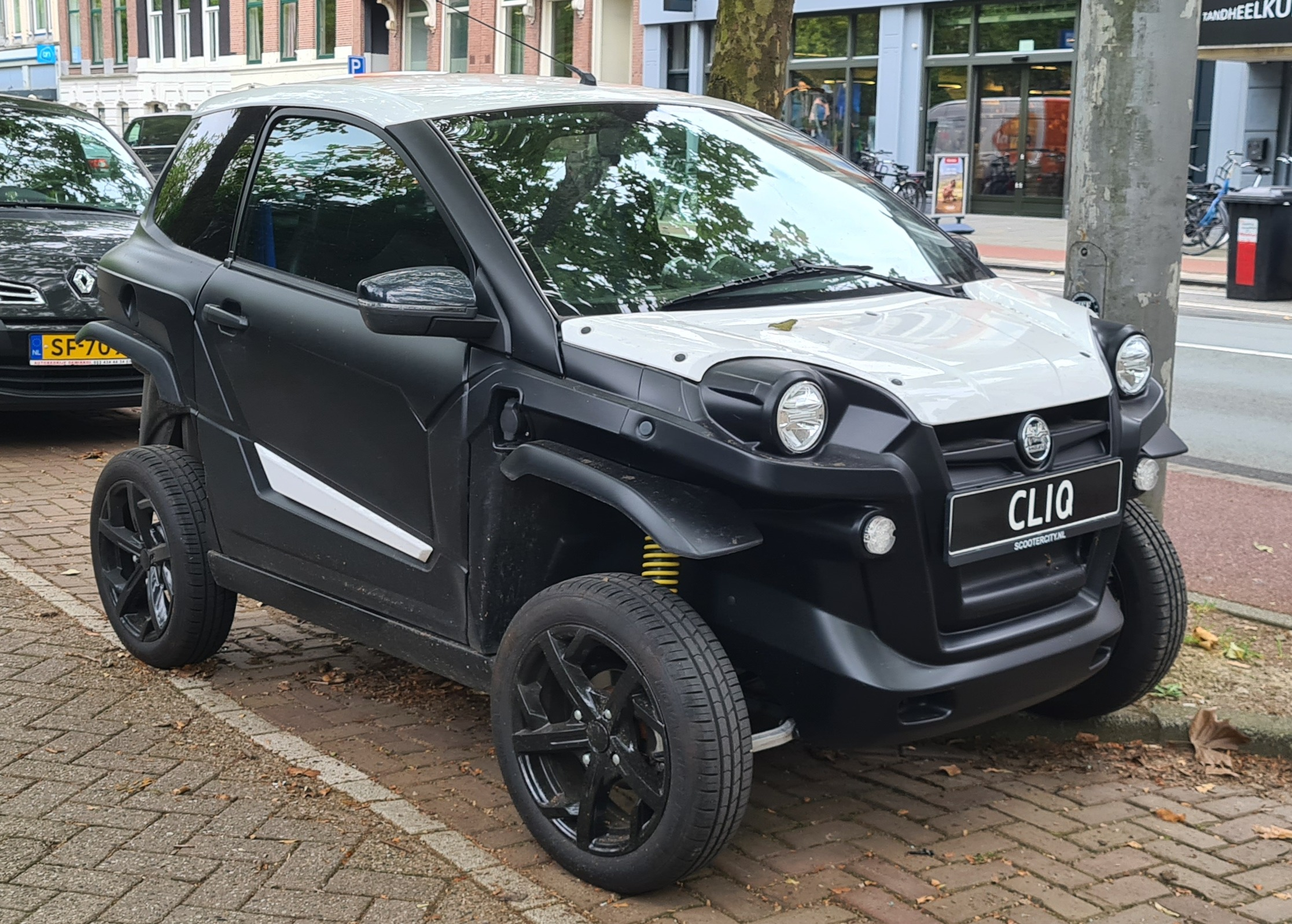
Aixam Mega e-Scouty

The Mega e-Scouty is an electric quadricycle that was launched in early 2023. Technically, it is very similar to the Aixam e-City, having the same 6 kW (8 hp) motor in the front and a range of about 75 km (47 mi).

== Gallery ==
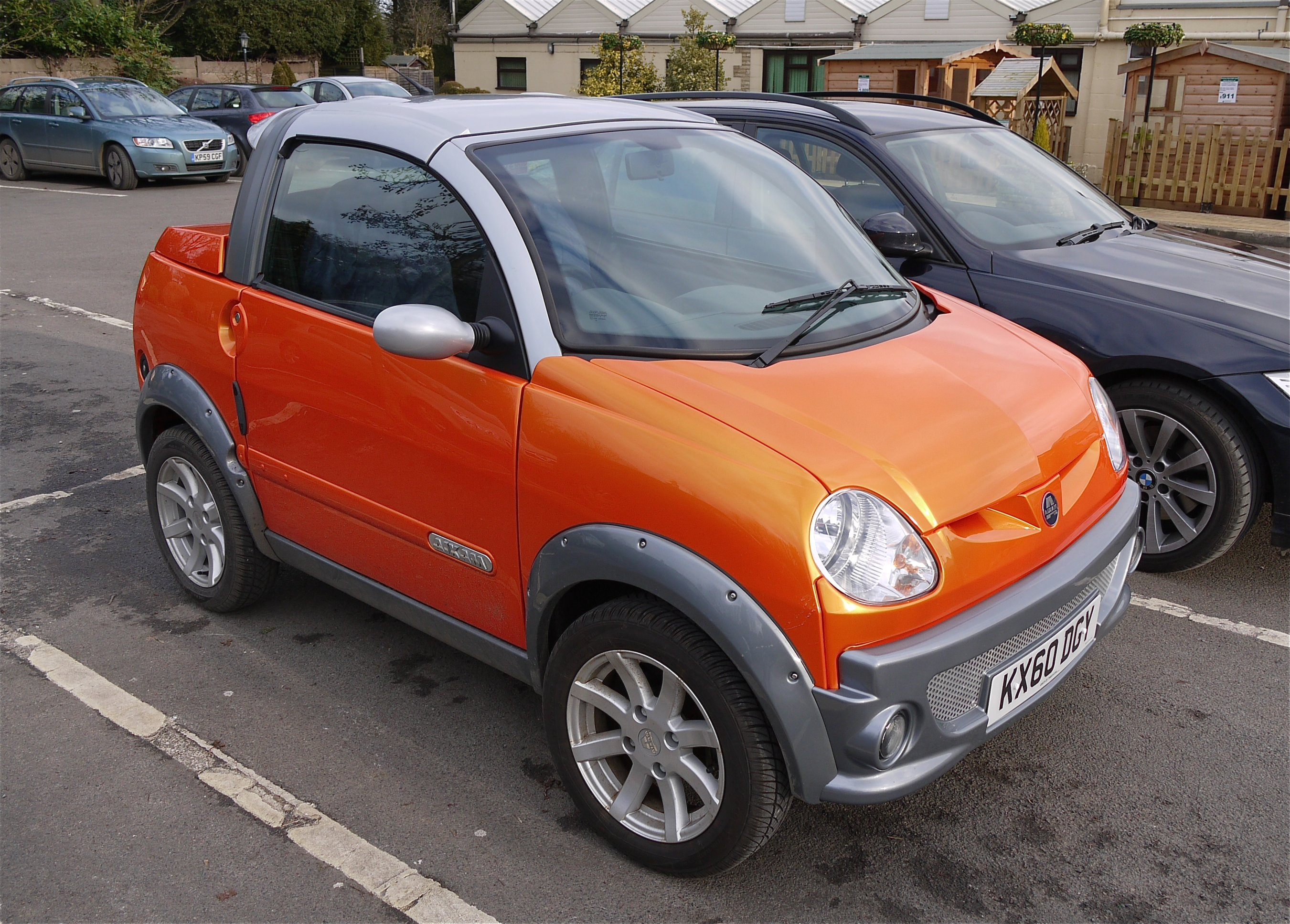
Aixam Scouty GTR

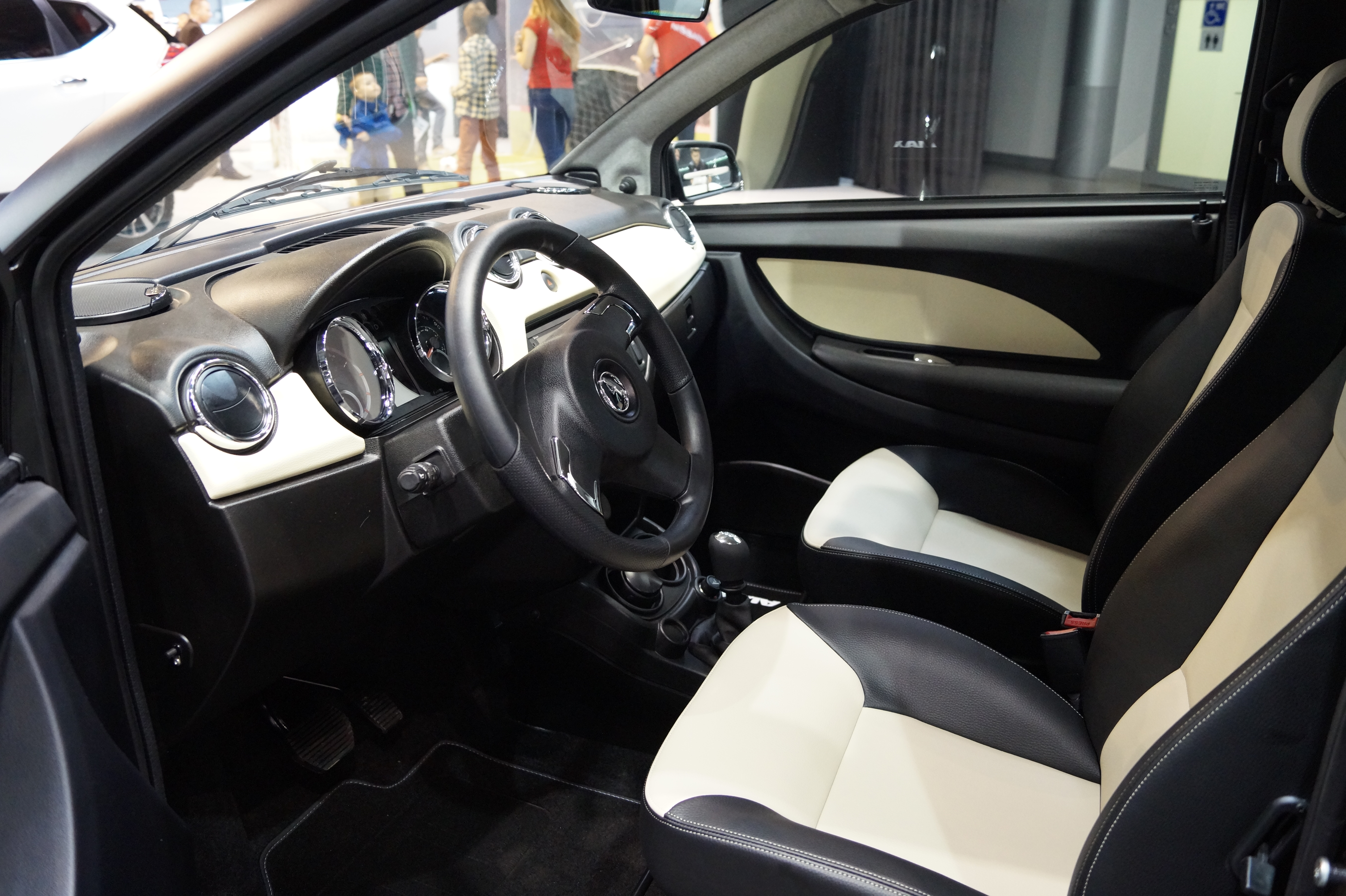
Interior of a 2015 Crossover GTR
