= Aixam =

French automobile manufacturer

Aixam-Mega
- Type: Private
- Industry: Automotive microcars
- Founded: 1983; 43 years ago
- Headquarters: Aix-les-Bains, Savoie, France
- Key people: Olivier Pelletier (managing director)
- Products: Automobile
- Production output: ▲19,131 vehicles (2023)
- Revenue: ▲€198.6 million (2023)
- Net income: ▲€36.6 million (2023)
- Owner: Polaris Industries (44%)
- Website: aixam.com

Aixam-Mega (French pronunciation: [eksam meɡa]) is a French automobile manufacturer based in Aix-les-Bains, Savoie. It was founded in 1983 to make microcars following the acquisition of Arola. On 11 April 2013, US based Polaris Industries announced that it had acquired Aixam-Mega from previous owners Axa Private Equity.

== History ==
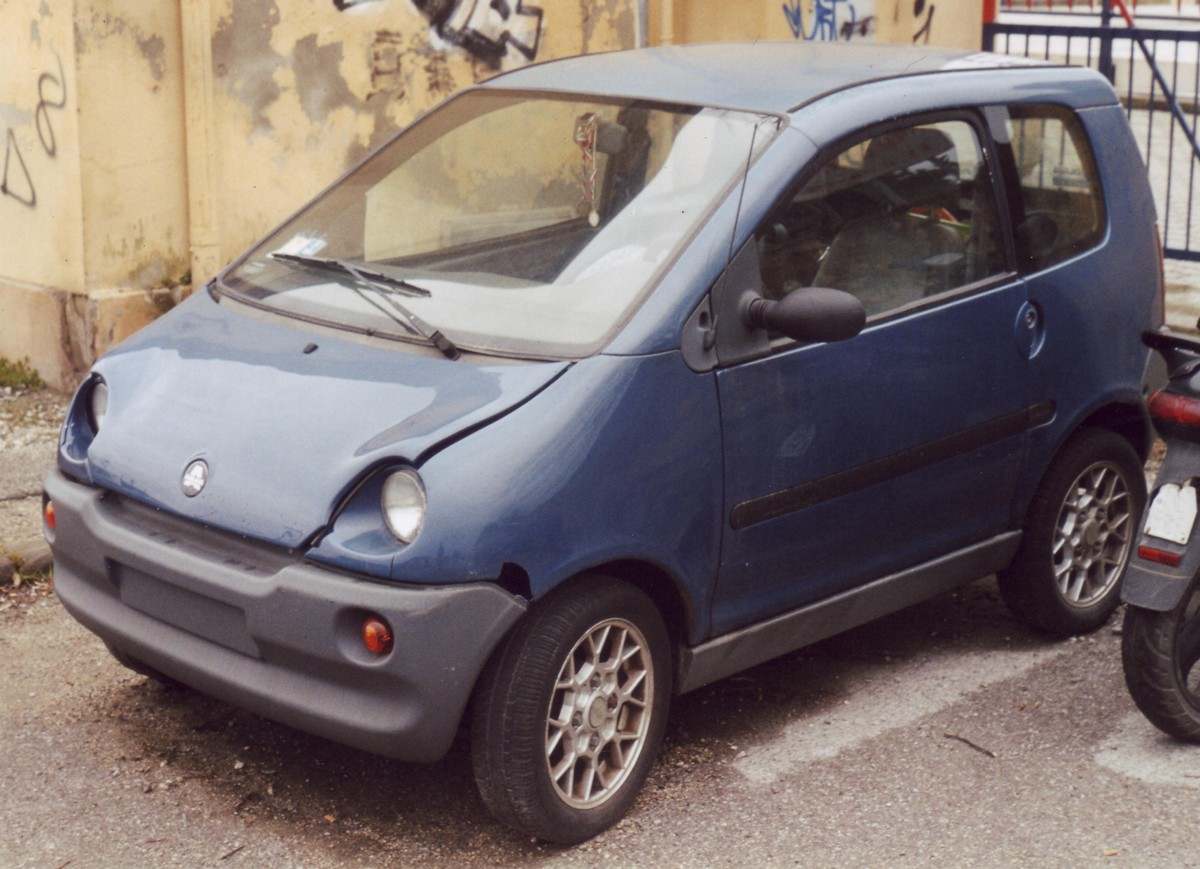
Aixam 400

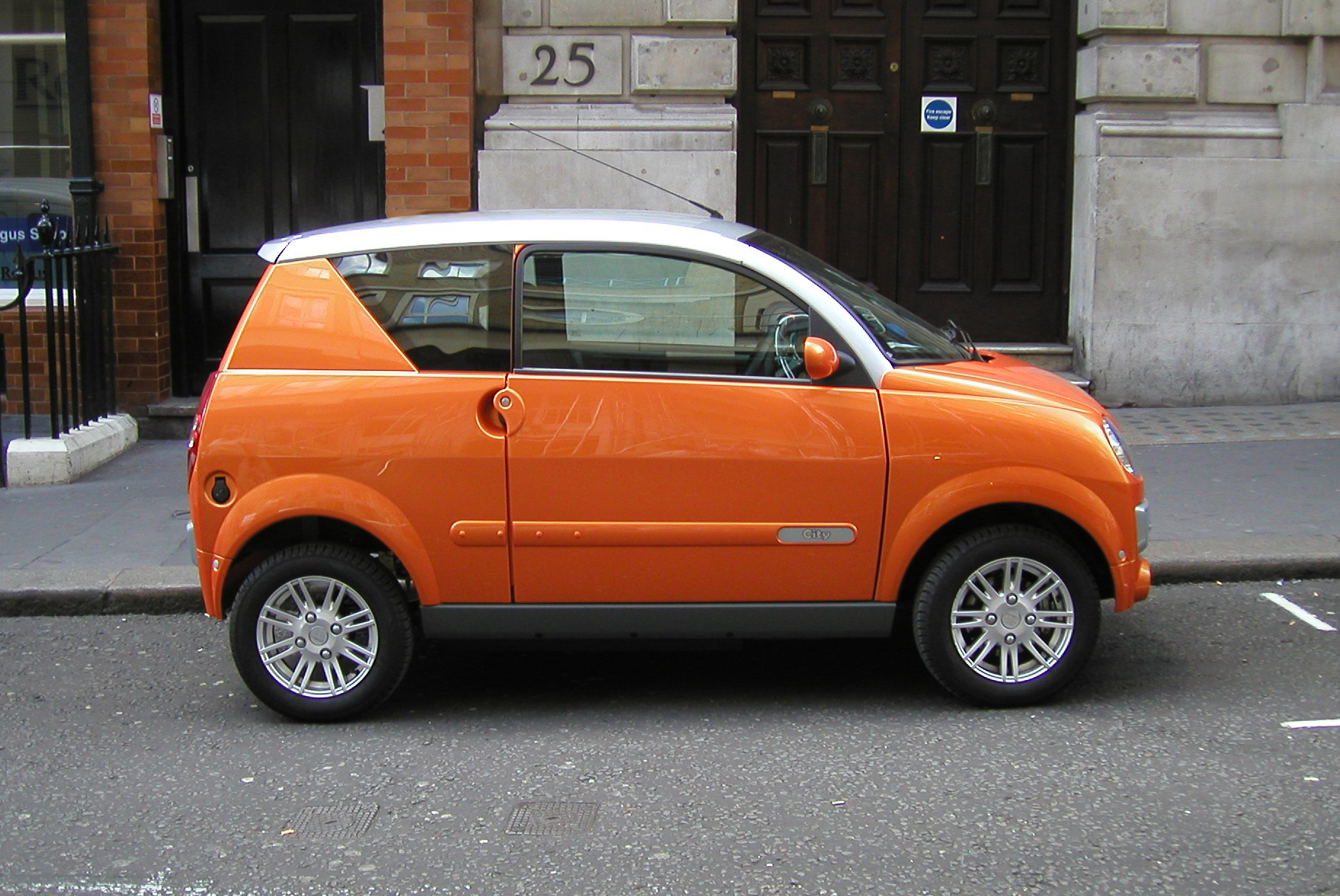
Aixam A.741

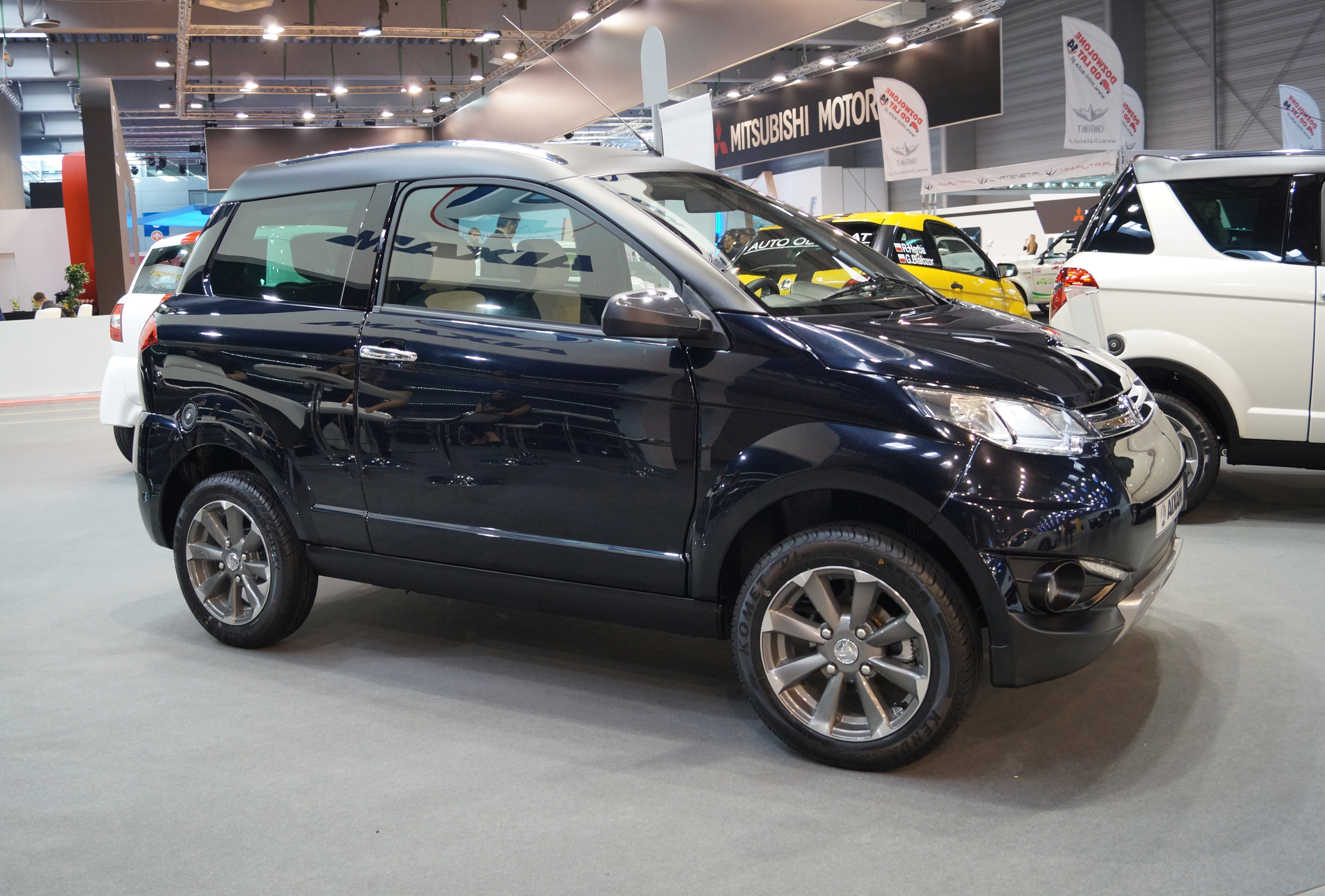
Aixam Crossover GTR

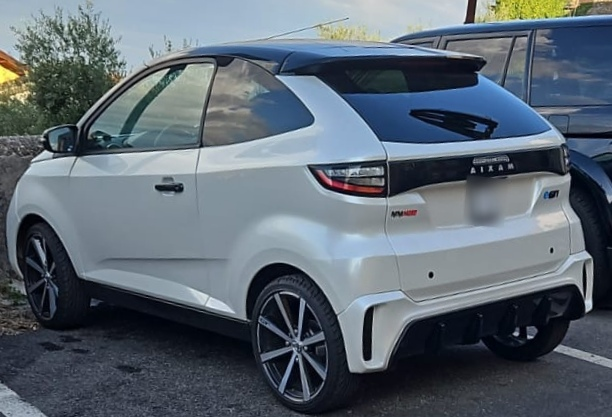
Aixam eCoupé GTI, electric motor, a 2024 model

The company can trace its history back to the establishment of Arola in 1975, which was acquired by Aixam in 1983 out of administration. In 1984, Aixam launched the new 325D, followed by the 400D in 1985.

In 1992, they started making a range of standard sized cars under the Mega brand, but by 2002, this brand was just being applied to a diesel and electric range of microvans and light utility vehicles.

The company currently produces the Aixam A.7xx series (where xx is a two-digit number), a microcar comparable with the Smart Fortwo, and powered by diesel engines from Kubota). A notable difference is that some of the smaller models are restricted to 45 kilometres per hour (28 mph) and can therefore be driven without a driving licence in some European countries (including Belgium, Estonia, Germany, France, Portugal, Slovakia, Spain, and Slovenia).

In Britain, they are classified as a category L7e quadricycle (quad bike) because of their weight and power output. This requires a category B1 licence to legally drive them. In January 2013, the law changed such that special restricted low power versions of the car (Aixam 400) can now be driven by full AM licence holders in the UK.

In 2006, Mega launched the electric "Mega City" at the British International Motor Show and in 2009 acquired the assets of NICE Car Company, which had gone into administration in 2008.

In April 2013, Aixam was acquired by the American group Polaris Industries.

In September 2024, the new factory in Andancette was inaugurated, the third of the group, resulting from an investment of 30 million euros.

In April 2026, Aixam launched the new Easy range of microcars, the successor to the previous Minauto series. The Easy models are essentially the old Minauto vehicles, updated with a redesigned front end and a new Kubota diesel engine compliant with Euro 5+ standards, as well as an electric version.

== Aixam mechanics ==
The Aixam 400, 500, and 500.5 are very basic vehicles mechanically by today's standards. There were a variety of engines offered over the years. The diesel is fitted with a Kubota Z402 two-cylinder 400 cc industrial engine rated at 4 to 6 kW (5 to 8 PS). The petrol versions used a Lombardini 505 cc twin-cylinder of approx 20 PS (15 kW), later petrol cars were fitted with fuel-injection.

Steering is by rack and pinion and has a comparatively low ratio. MacPherson strut suspension is used at the front and semi-trailing arms at the rear. Brakes are by disc and single-piston calipers at the front, with drums at the rear also serving for handbrake function, via cables.

Transmission is by a continuously-variable transmission (CVT) made and supplied by CVTech-IBC. The reversing gearbox and combined differential unit of 8:1 forward ratio, is supplied by the Italian company COMEX, which also supplies many of the other running-gear, steering, suspension and braking system components. The gearbox is designed for small town runabout or delivery van of less than 8 PS (6 kW) and limited to 30 mph (48 km/h).

== Models ==
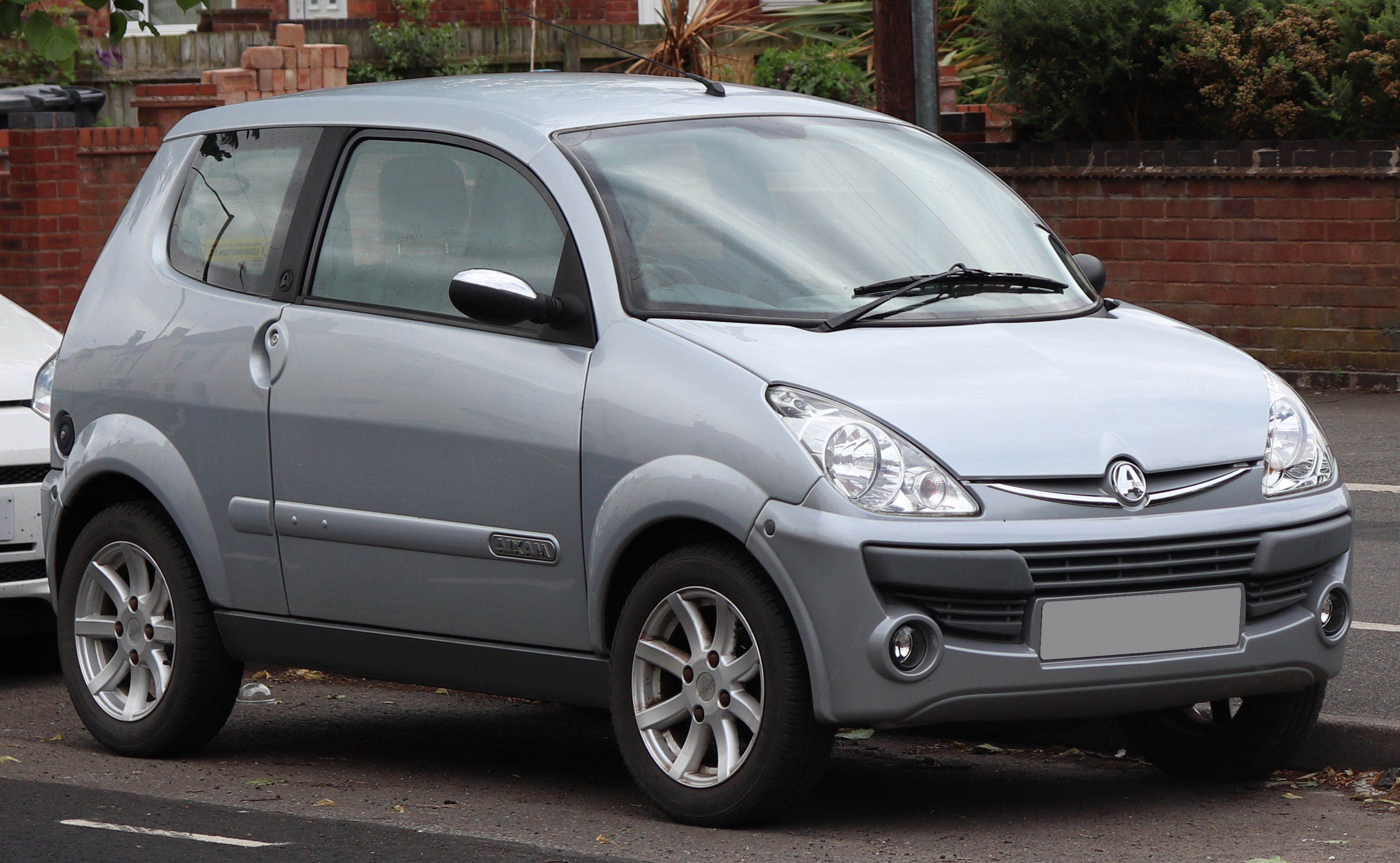

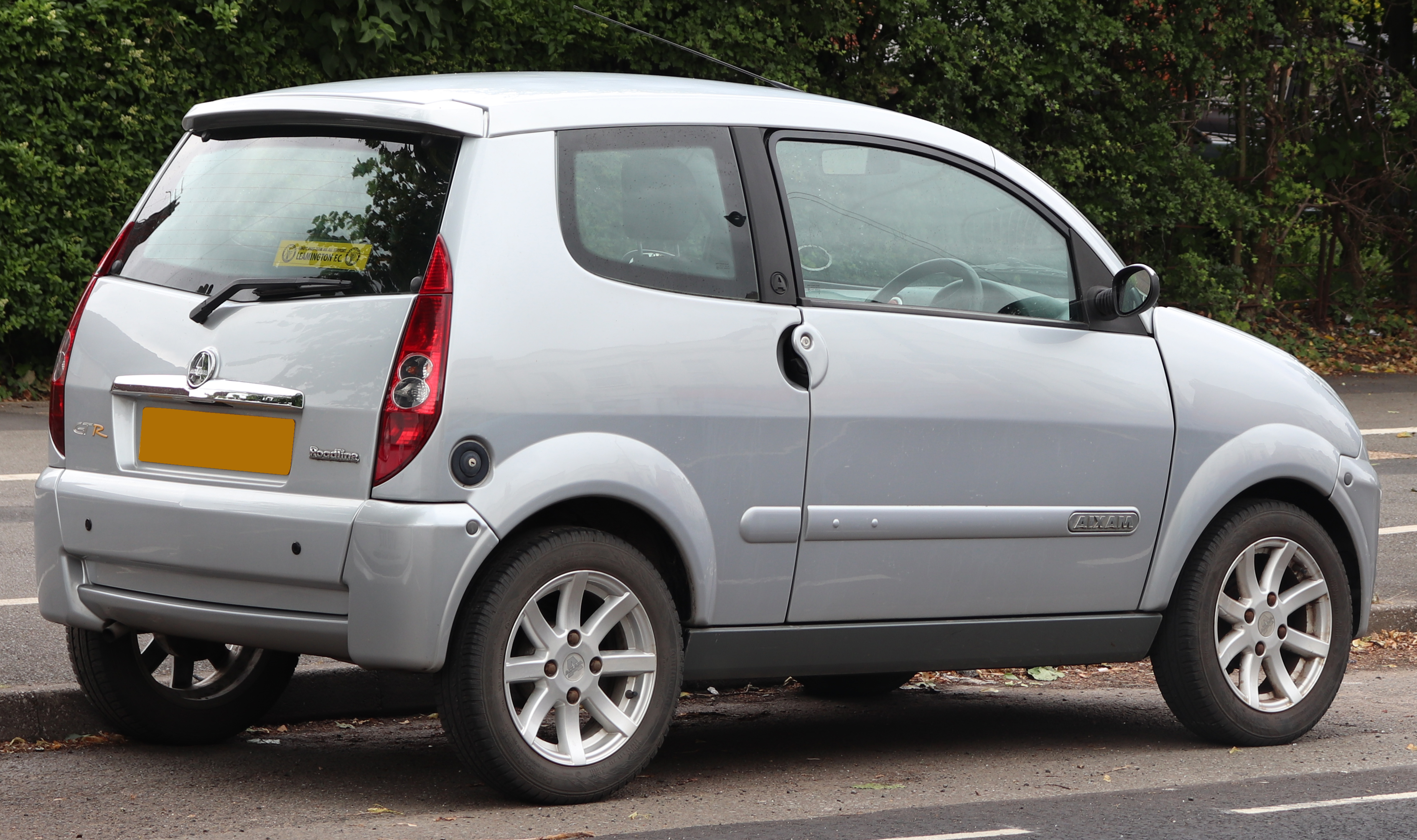
Aixam Crossline

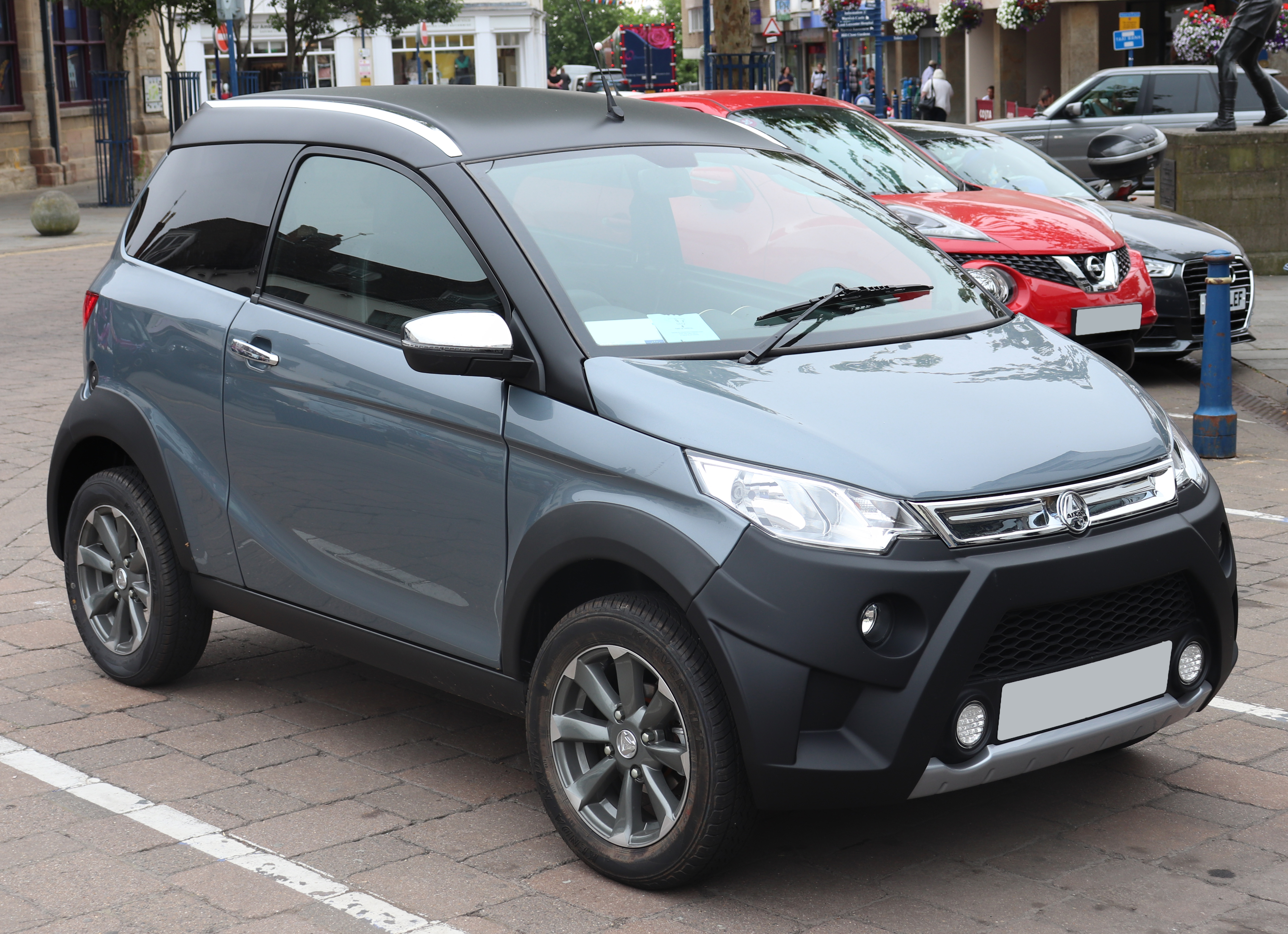

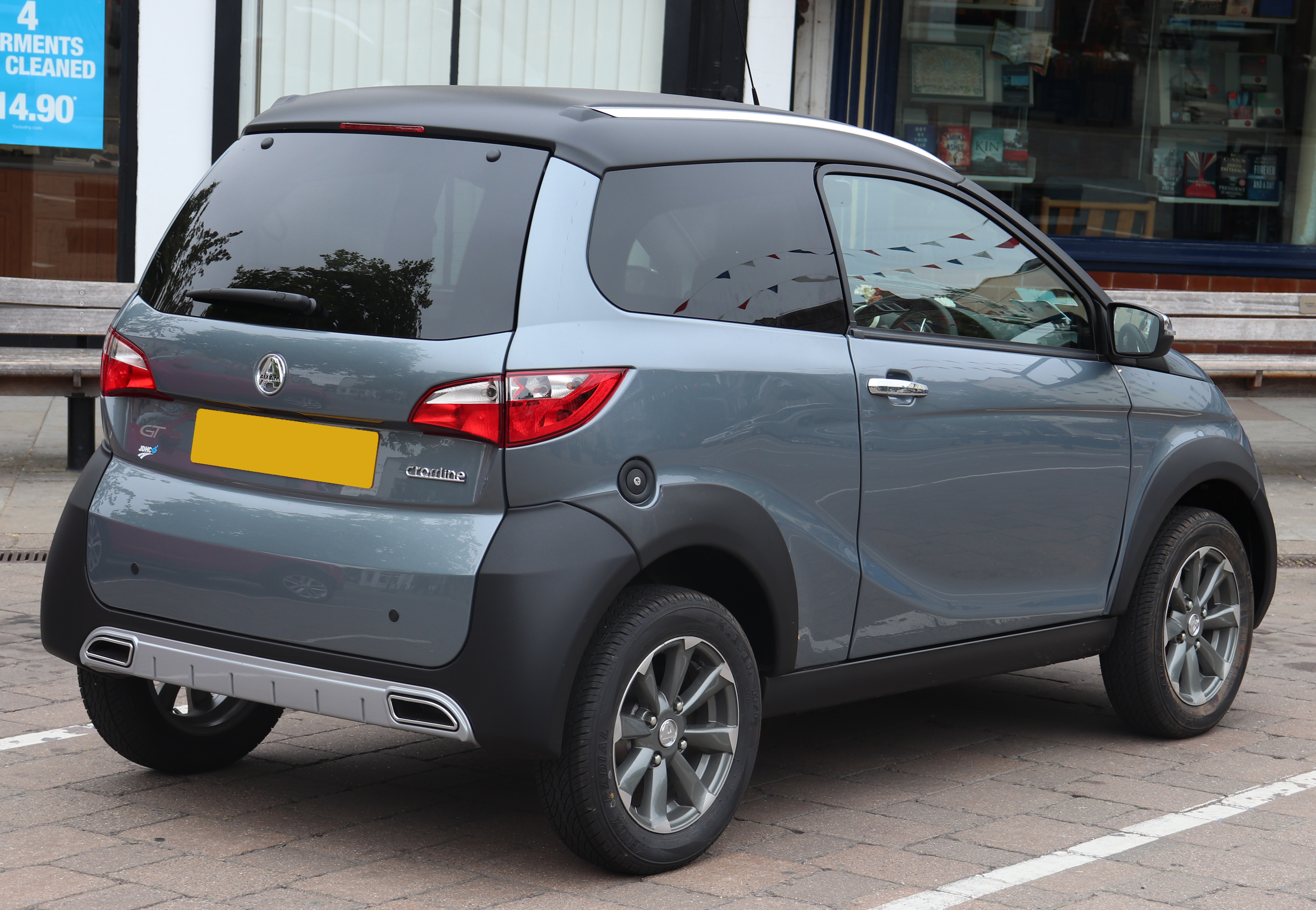
2018 Aixam Crossline Premium GT

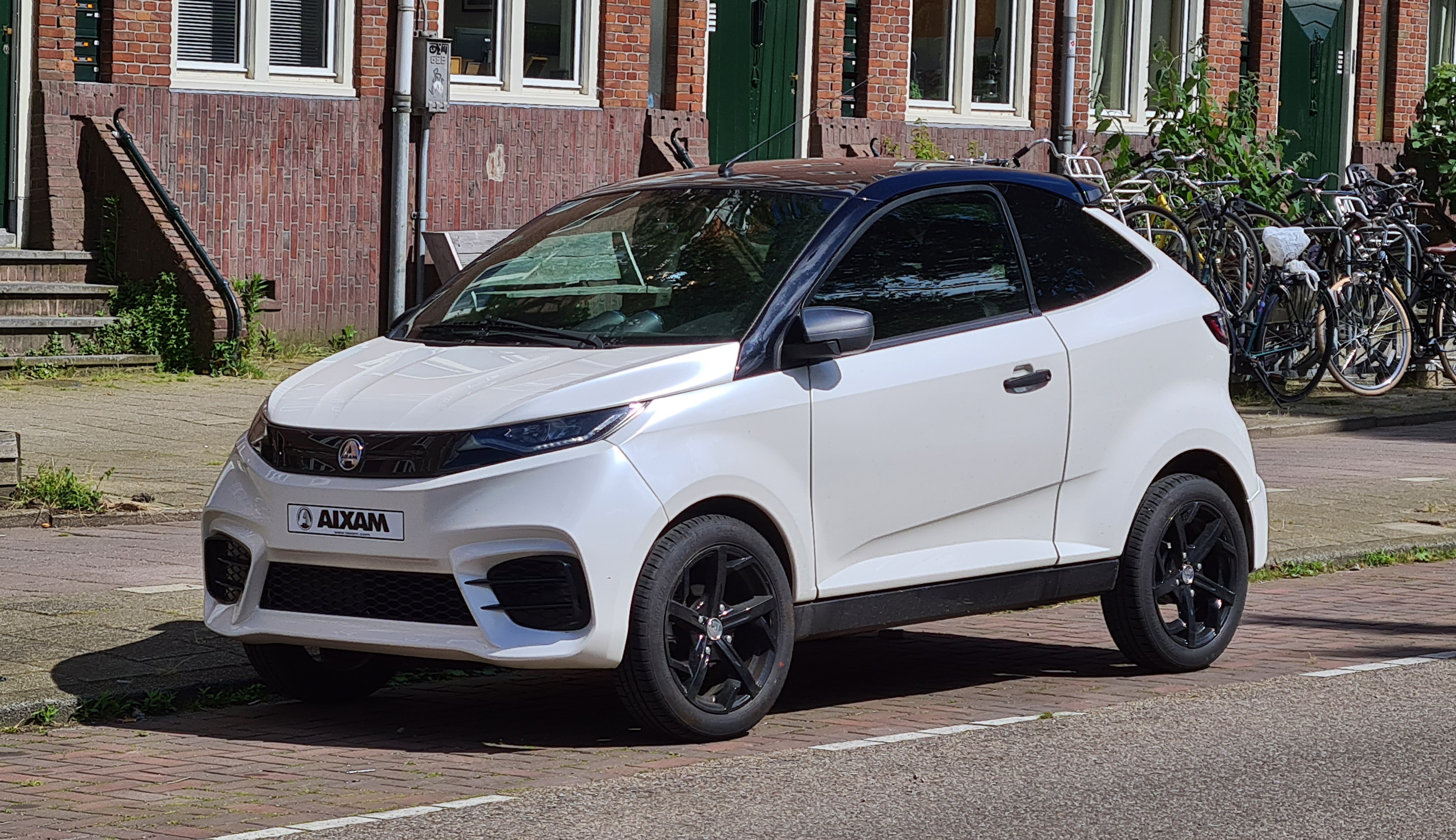

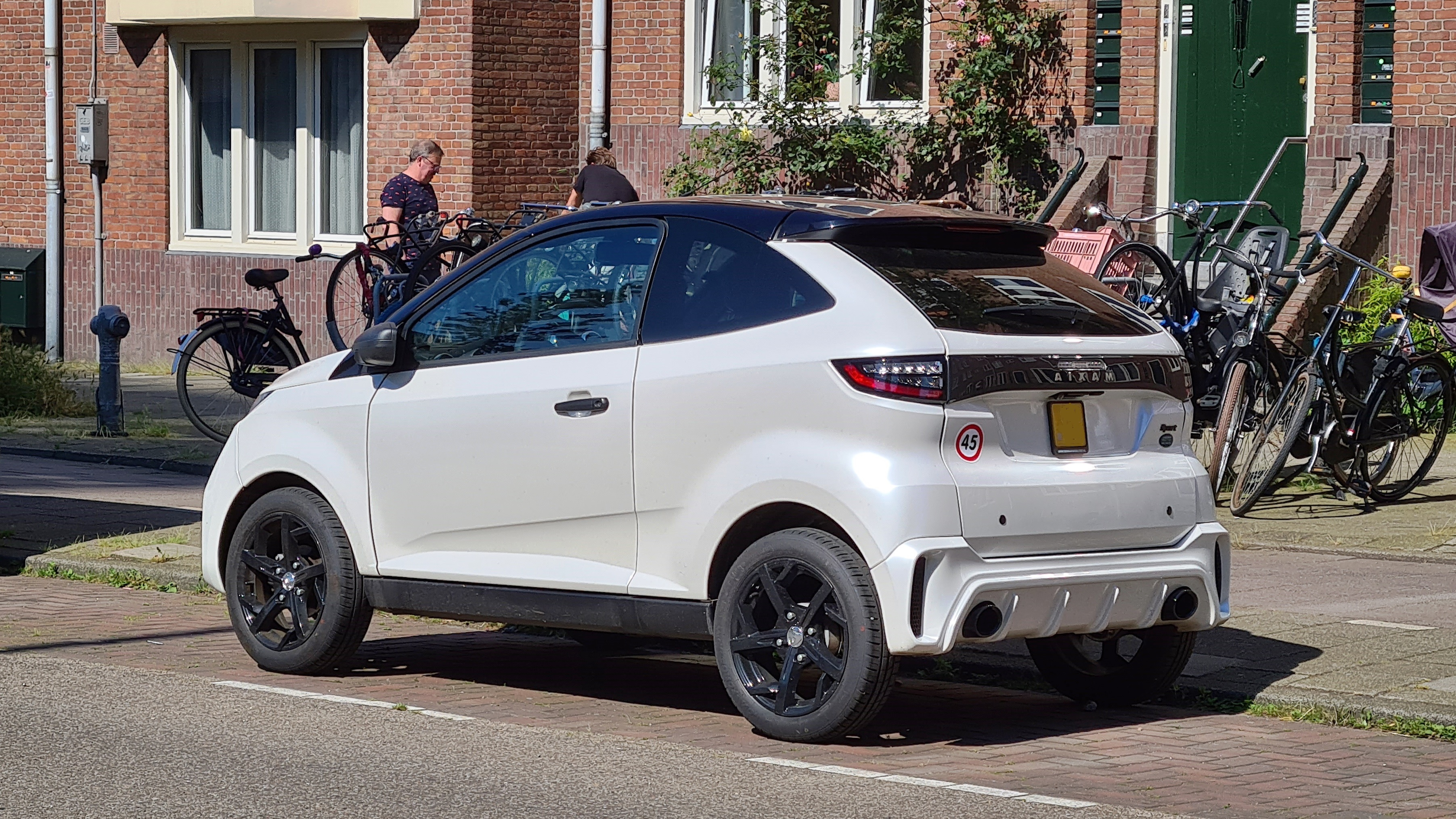
2023 Aixam S10 Coupé Sport

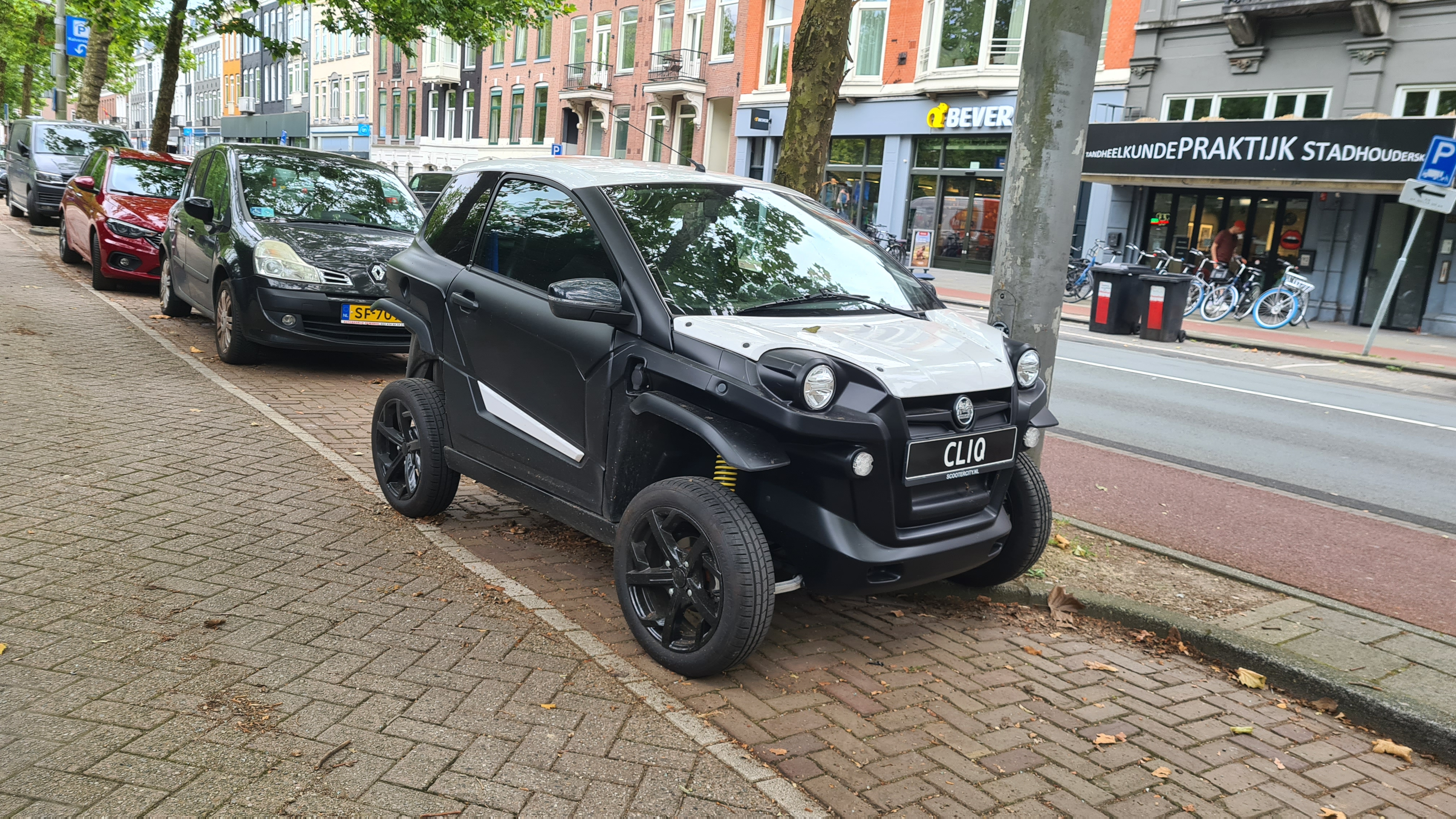

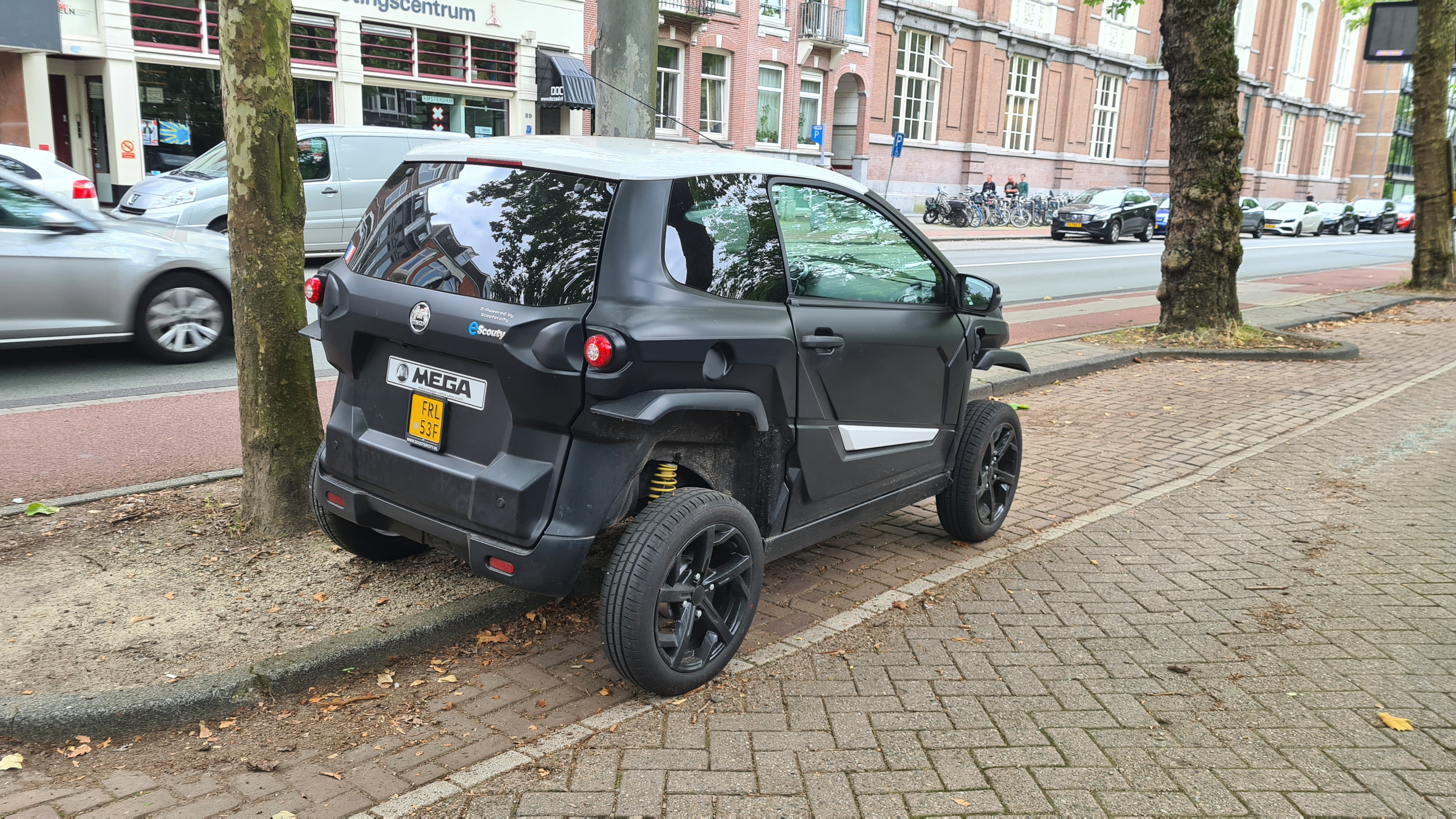
2023 Aixam Mega e-Scouty

=== Current ===
==== Easy range ====
- Easy Access
- Easy Chic

==== Emotion range ====
- City Pack
- City Sport
- City GTO
- Coupé Evo
- Coupé Premium
- Coupé GTI
- Crossline Evo
- Crossover Premium

==== eAixam range ====
- e-City Sport
- e-Coupé Premium
- e-Coupé GTI
- e-Crossover Premium
- Easy Access Electric
- Easy Chic Electric

==== Aixam Pro utility vehicles ====
- D-Truck Drop Side
- D-Truck Van
- e-Truck Drop Side
- e-Truck Van

==== Mega ====
- Mega e-Scouty (from 2023)

=== Former ===
==== Aixam ====
- Aixam 300, 400, 500
- Aixam A540, A550
- Aixam A.721
- Aixam A.741
- Aixam A.751
- Aixam Berlines
- Aixam MAC (1997)
- Aixam Microcar
- Aixam Minivan
- Aixam Pick-Up
- Aixam Roadline
- Aixam Scouty
- Aixam Scouty-R

==== Minauto range ====
- Minauto Access
- Minauto GT
- Minauto Cross
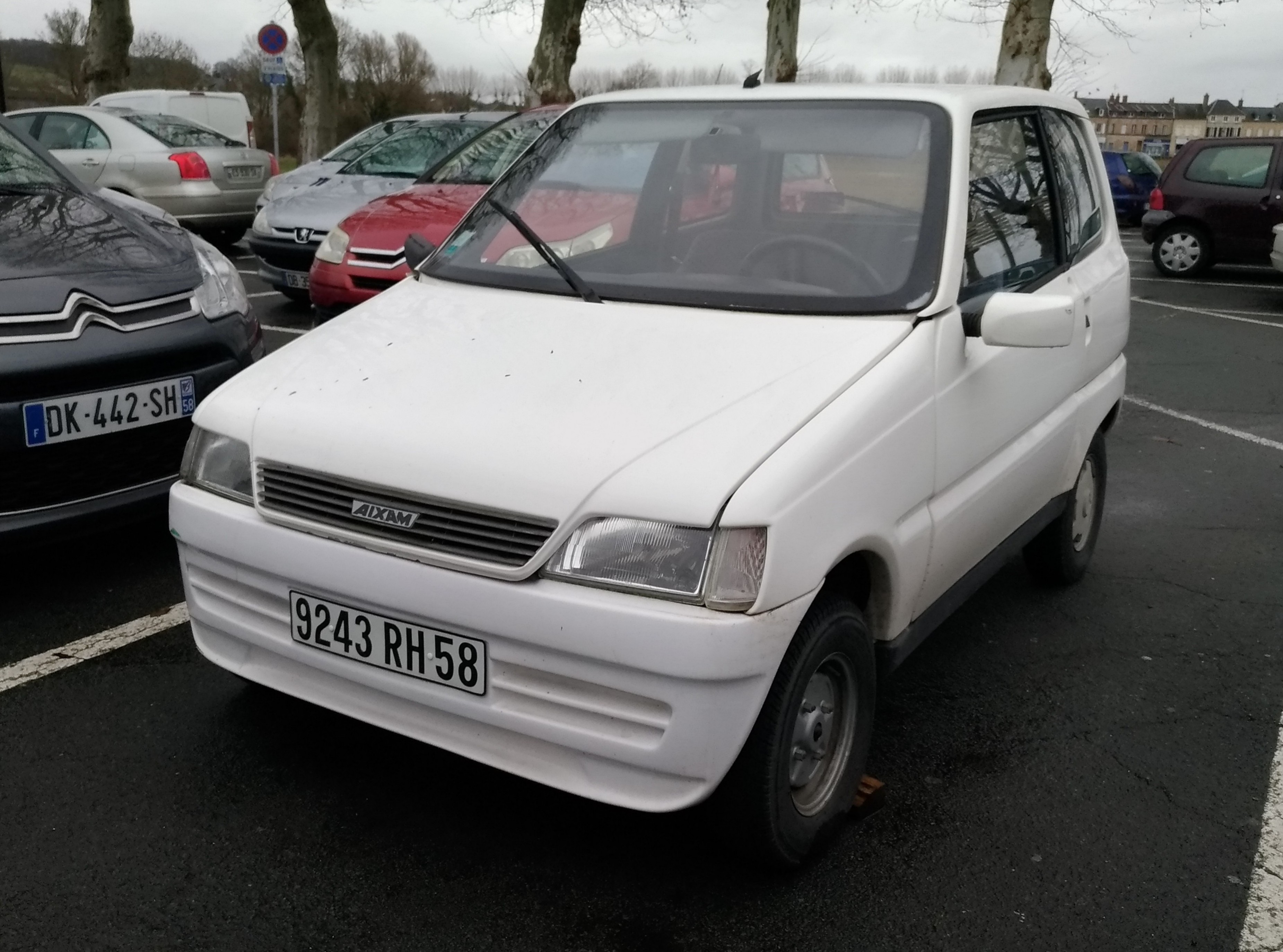
Aixam A540

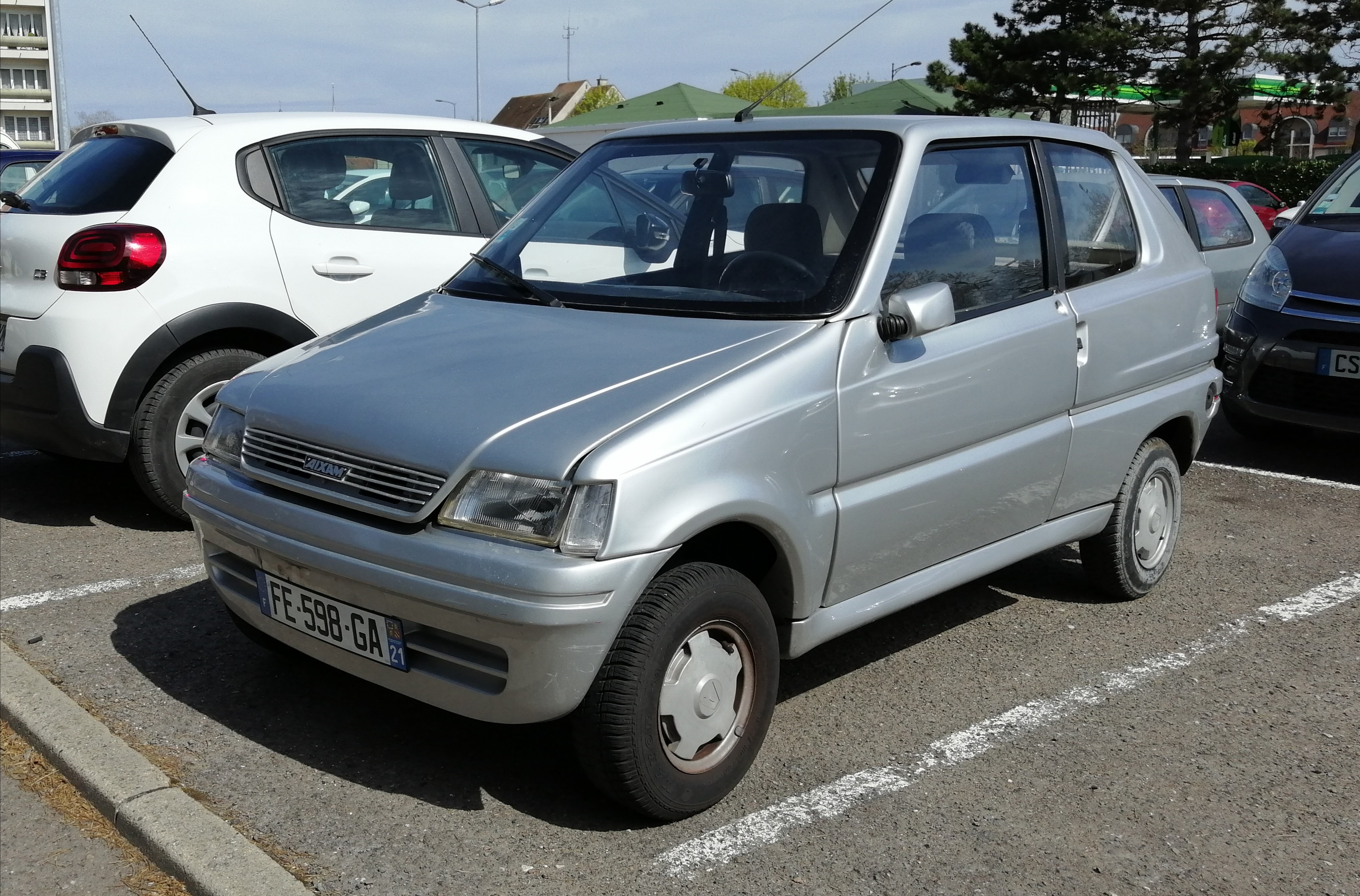
Aixam A550

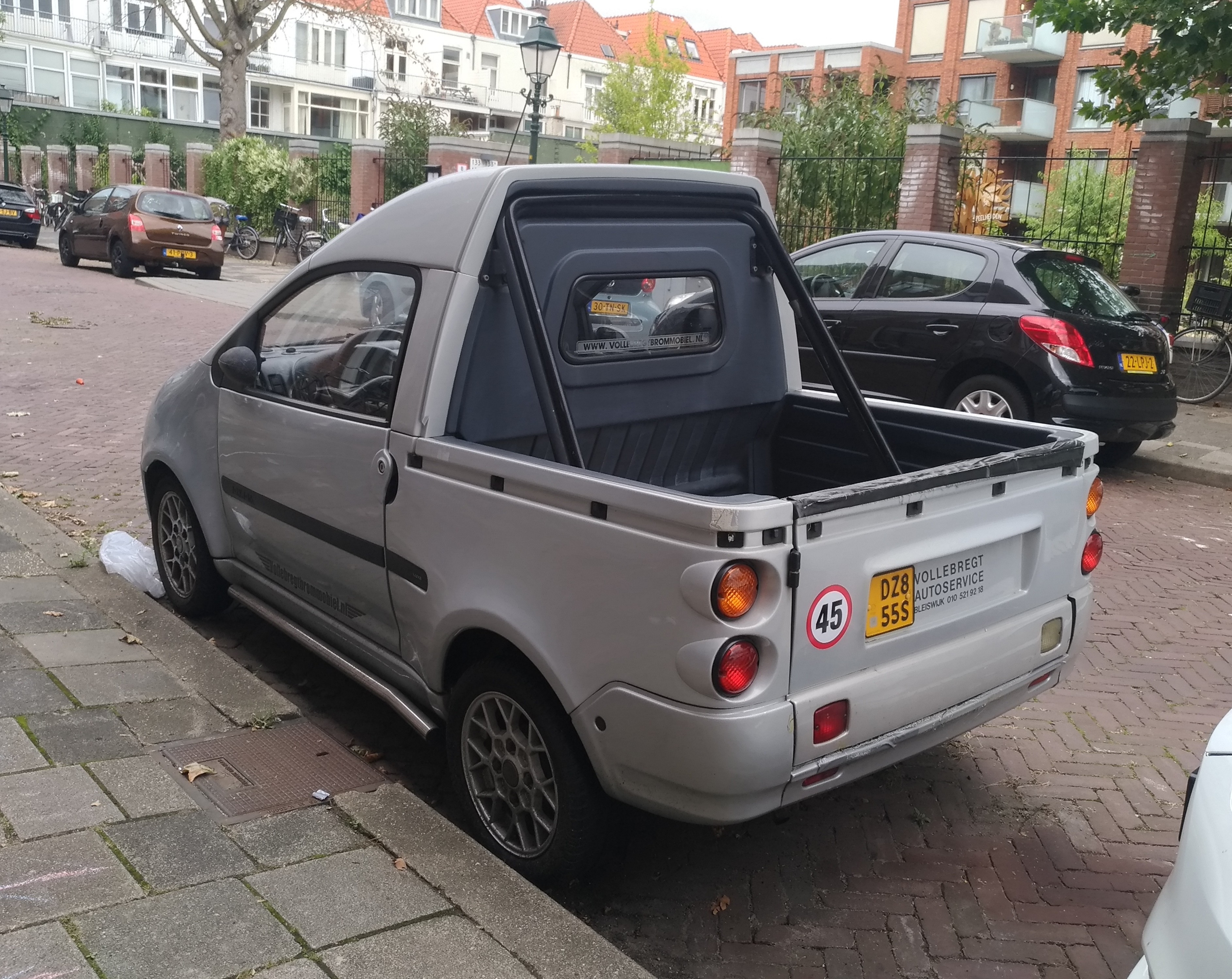
Aixam 500.4 Pick-Up

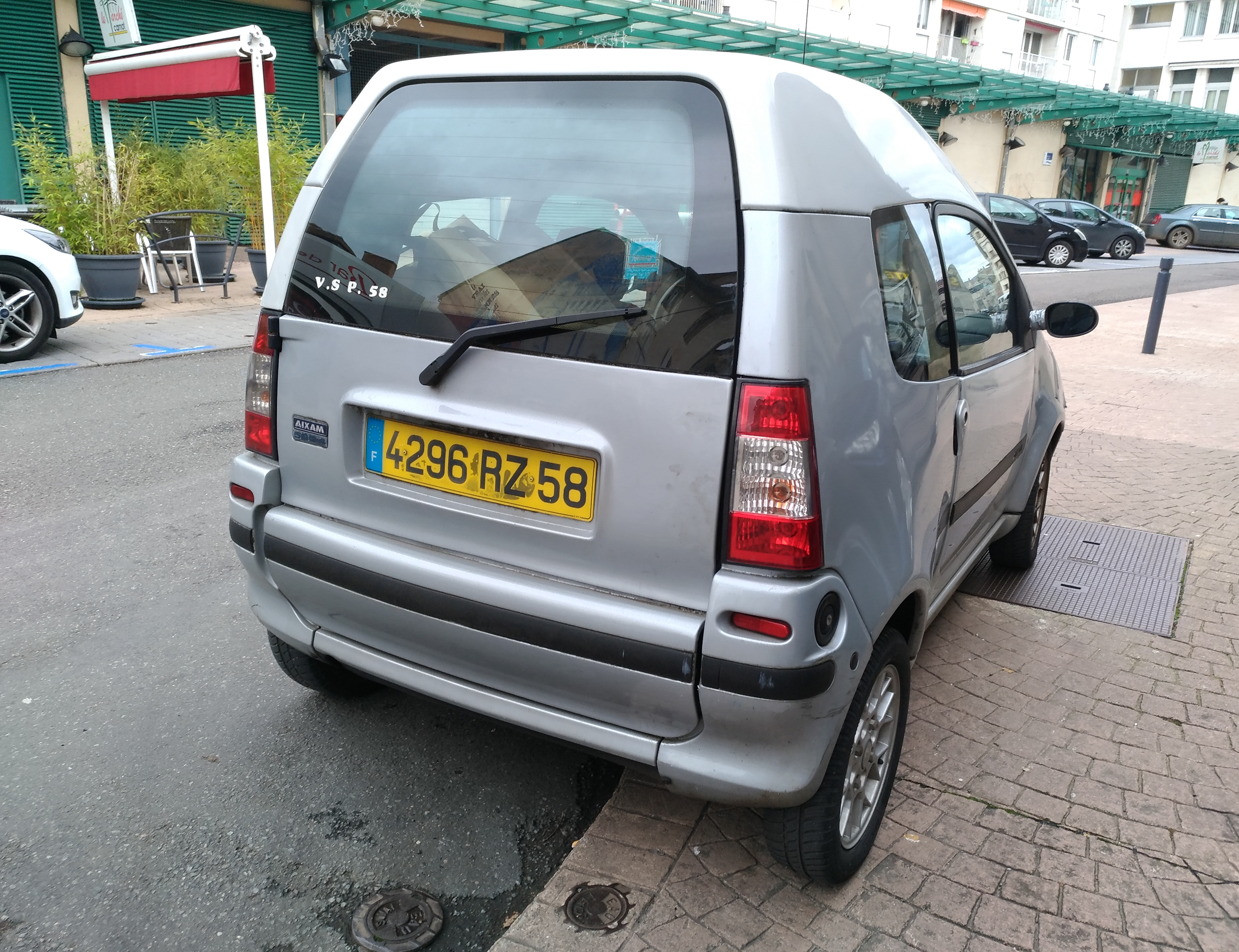
Aixam 500 Minivan

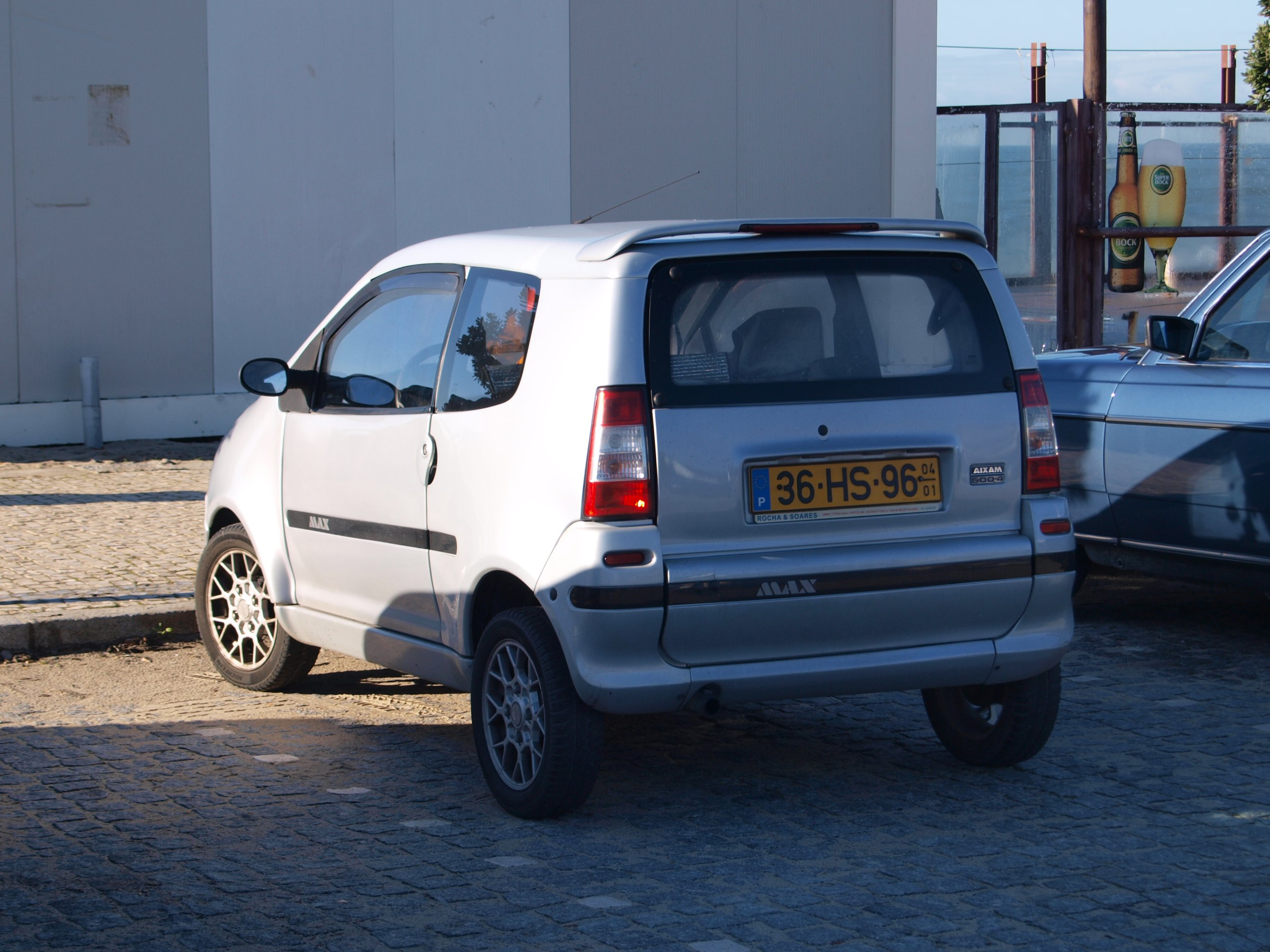
Aixam 600-4 MAX

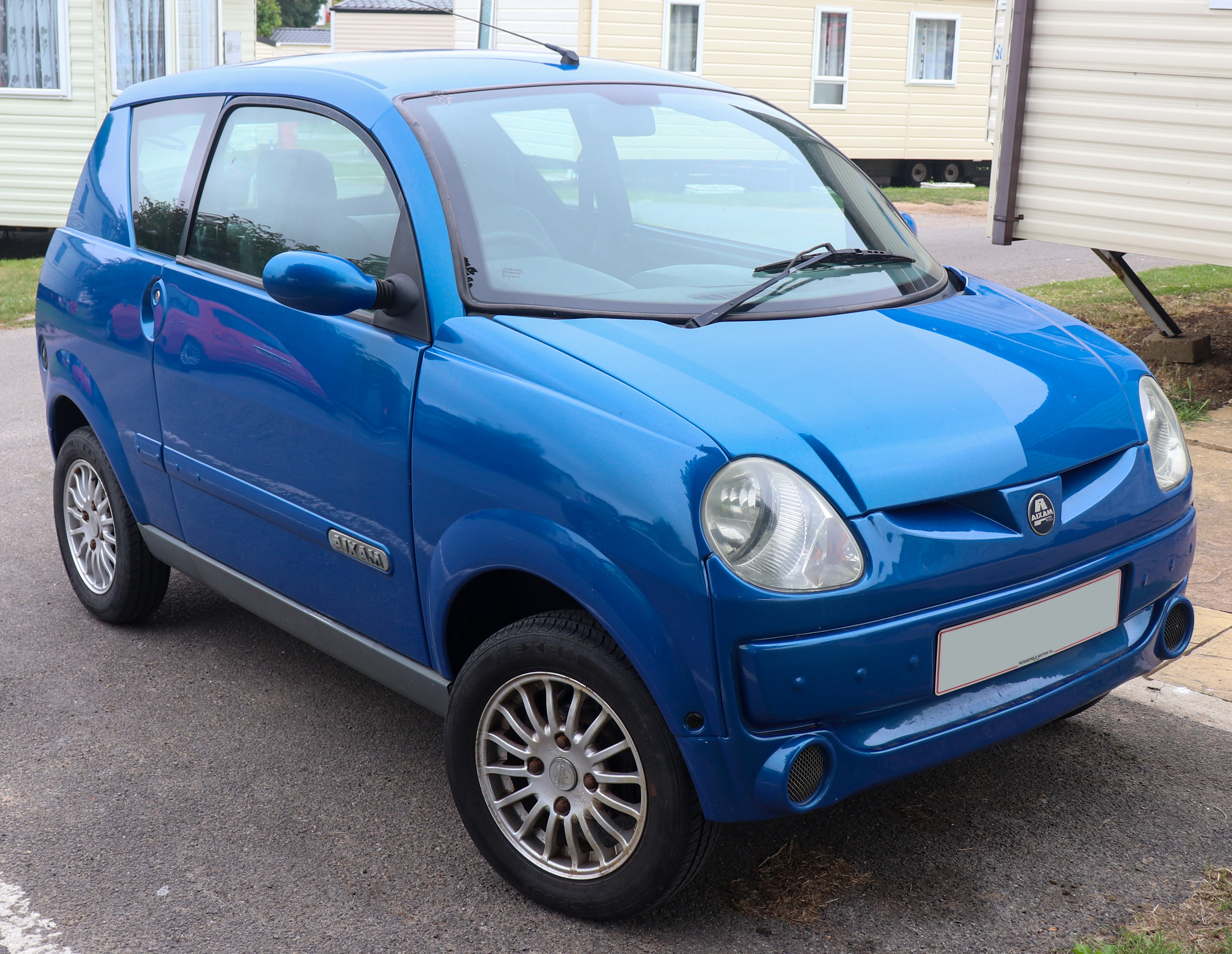
2006 Aixam A751

==== Mega ====
- Mega City
- Mega Club/Ranch - Citroën AX-based beach cars and offroad vehicles
- Mega Concept
- Mega Monte Carlo
- Mega Moskito Micro
- Mega Multitruck
- Mega Track (1992)
- Mega e-Worker
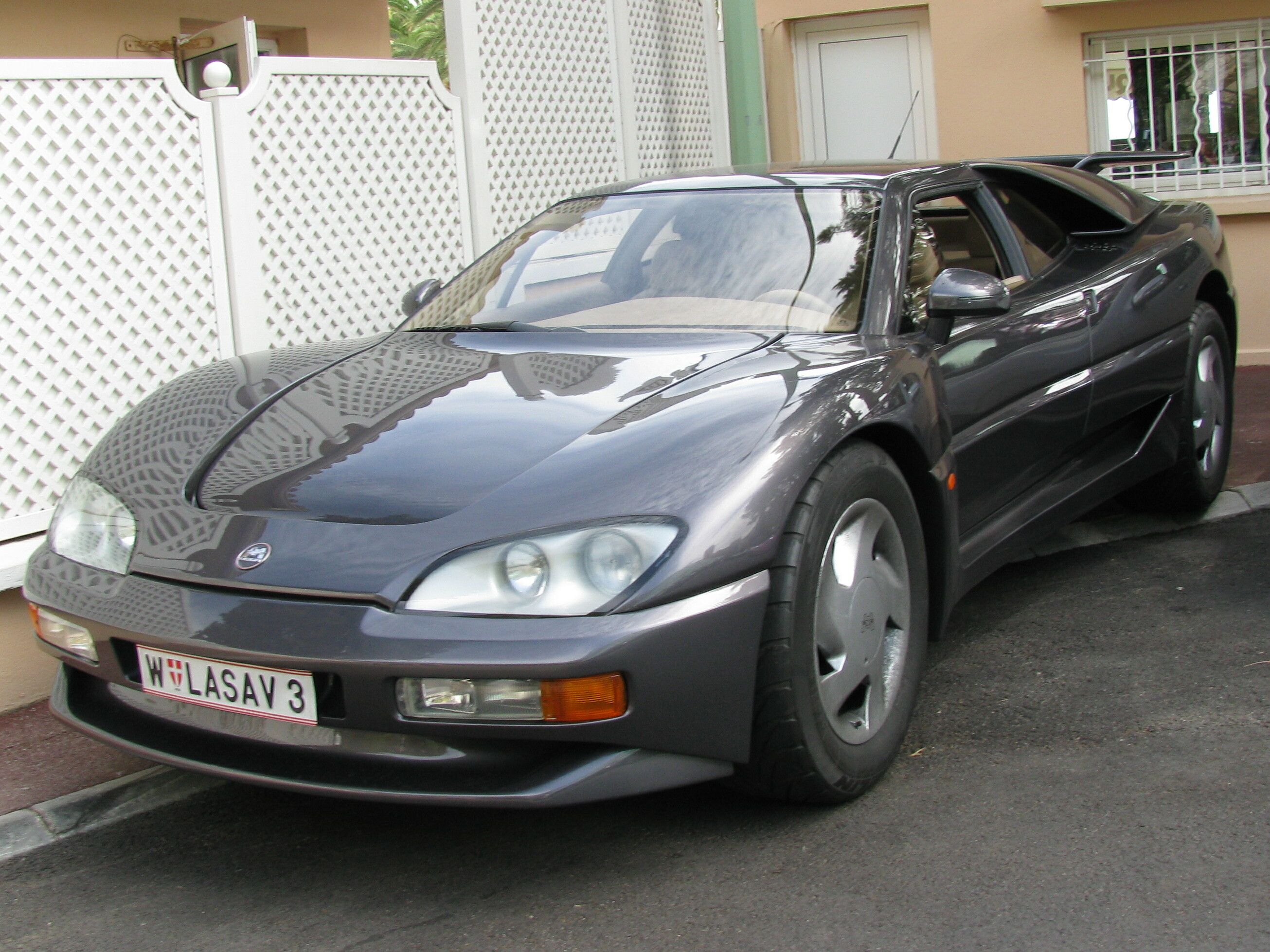
Mega Track

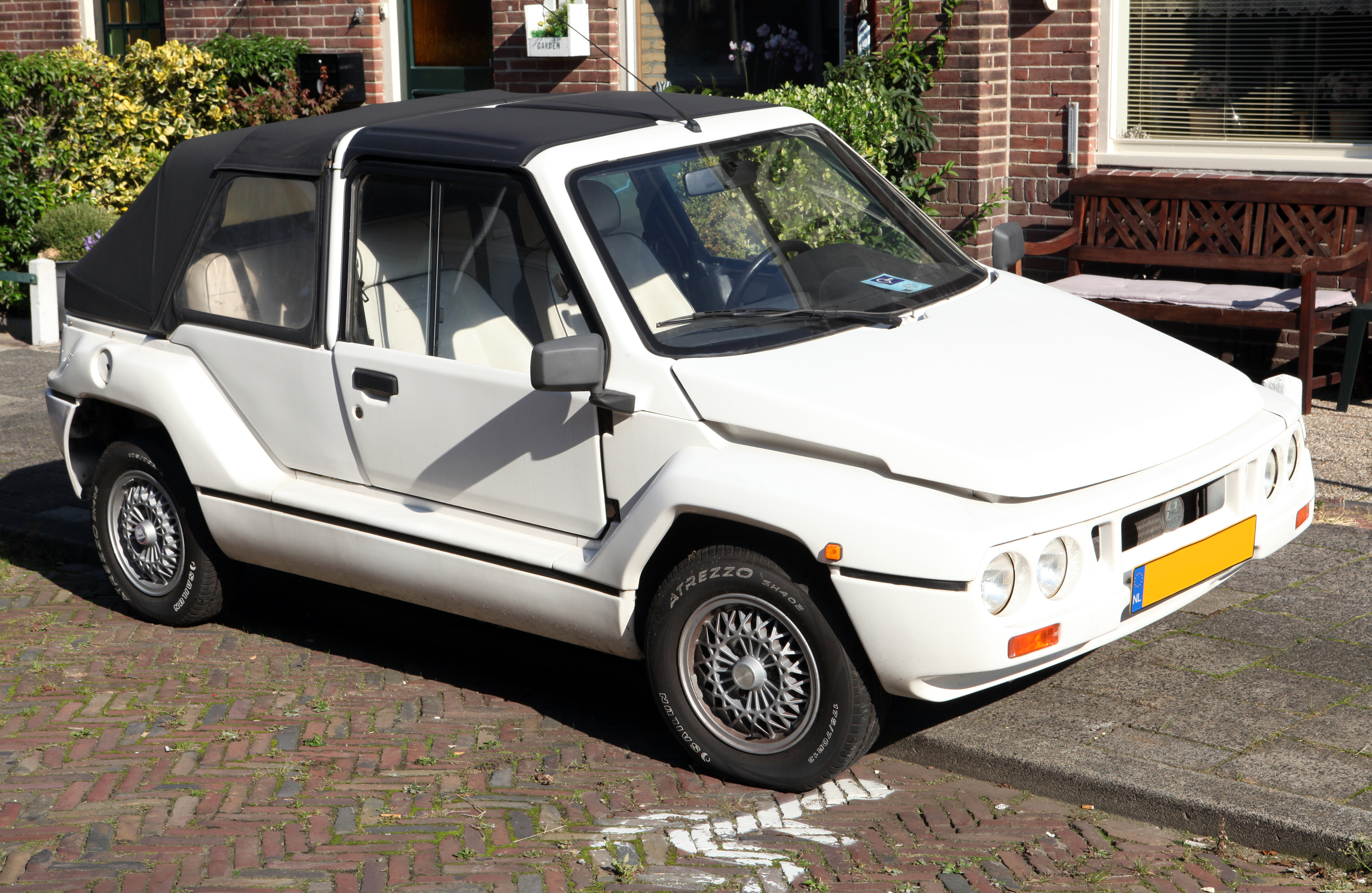
1996 Mega Club

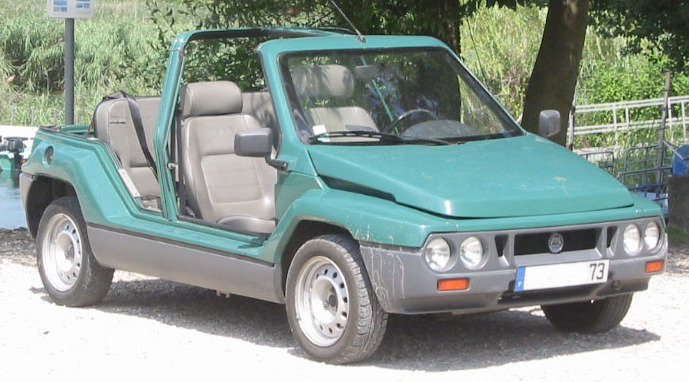
Mega Ranch

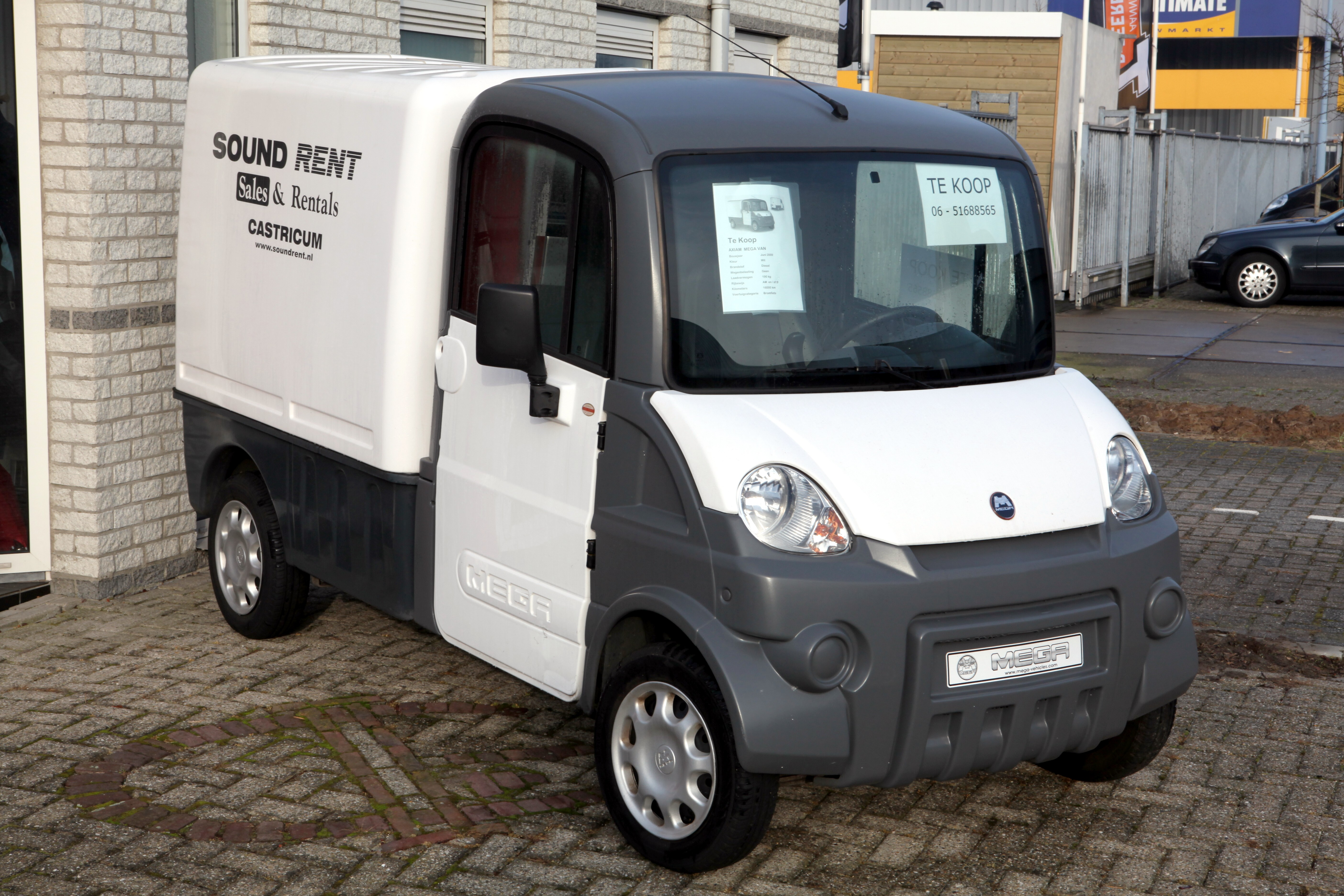
2009 Mega Van

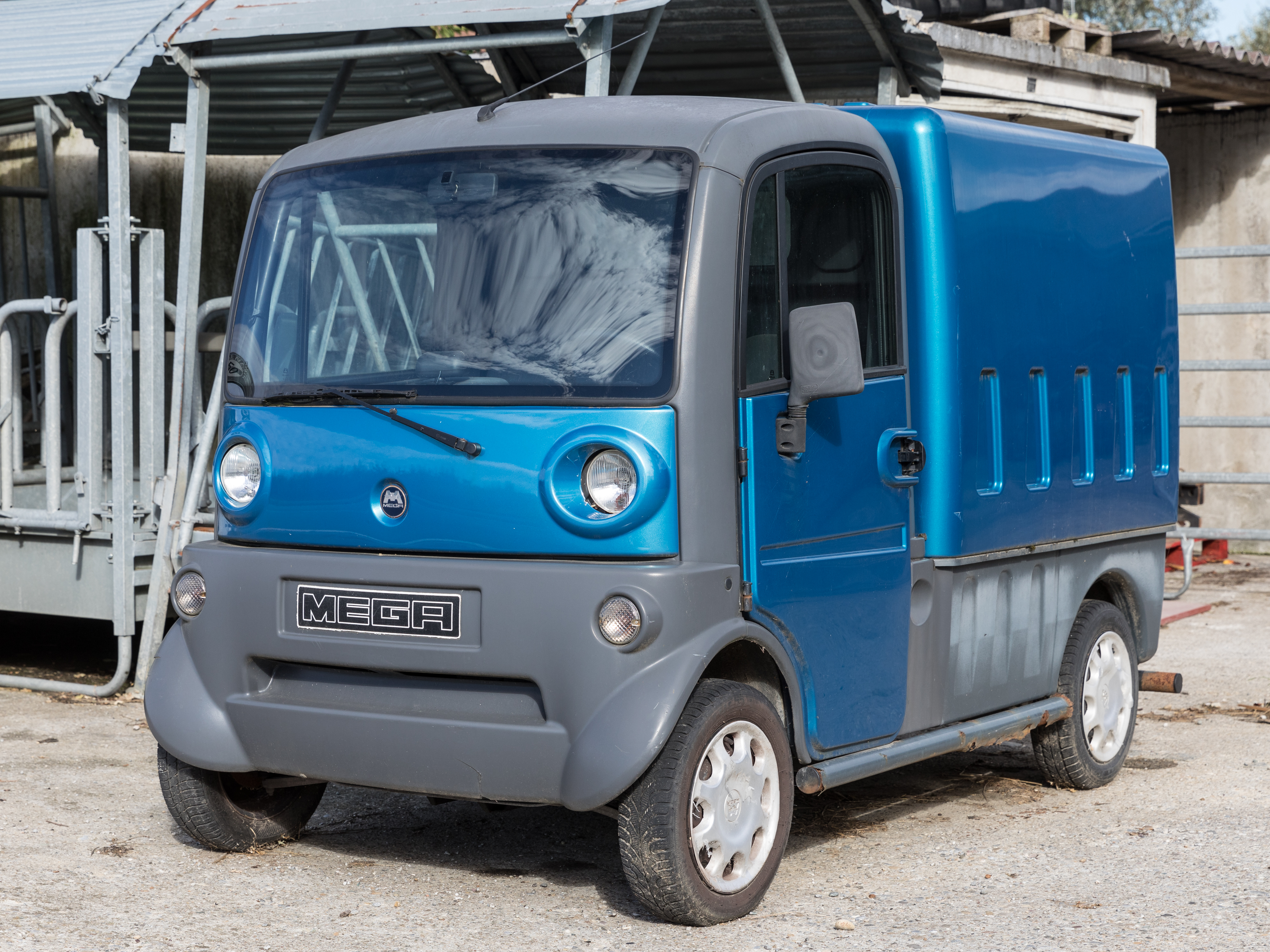
Mega Multitruck

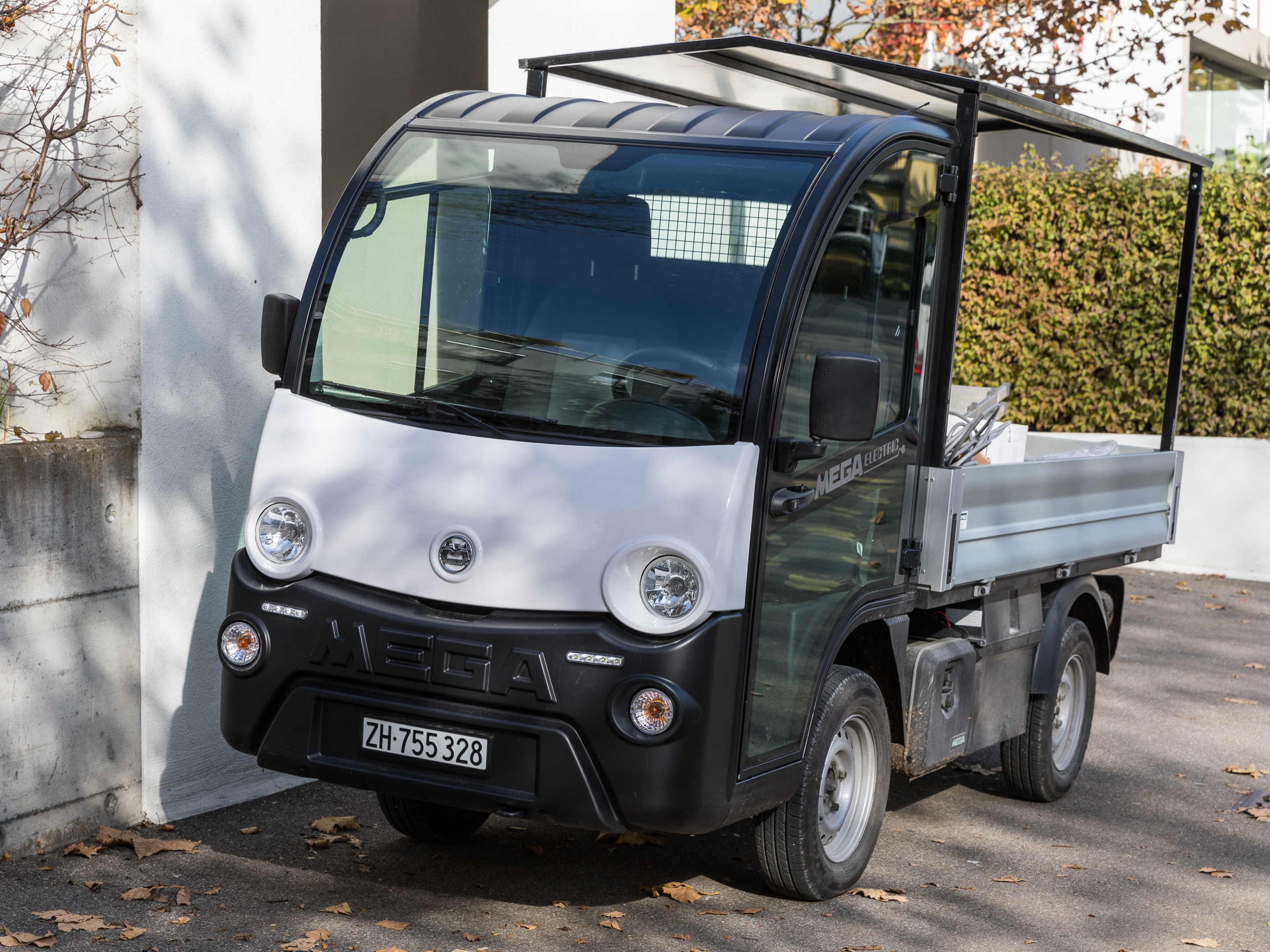
Mega e-Worker

== See also ==
- Renault Kangoo Z.E.
- Tazzari Zero
