= Mega Monte Carlo =

Méga Monte Carlo

Overview
- Manufacturer: Méga
- Also called: Monte Carlo GTB; MCA Centenaire
- Production: 1996–1999
- Designer: Fulvio Maria Ballabio & Guglielmo Bellasi

Body and chassis
- Class: Sports car
- Body style: 2-door coupé/targa
- Layout: Rear mid-engine, rear-wheel drive

Powertrain
- Engine: 5167 cc Lamborghini V12; 5991 cc 60° Mercedes-Benz M120 engine V12
- Transmission: 6-speed ZF manual

Dimensions
- Wheelbase: 2660 mm (104.7 in)
- Length: 4450 mm (175.2 in)
- Width: 1990 mm (78.3 in)
- Height: 1190 mm (46.9 in)
- Curb weight: 1500 kg (3306.9 lbs)

Chronology
- Predecessor: Mega Track

The Méga Monte Carlo is a French sports car.

== Monte Carlo GTB ==
In 1989, Fulvio Maria Ballabio designed a carbon fibre monocoque sports car under the newly established brand MCA (Monte Carlo Automobile). The car being born Monegasque, it was decided to name it the Centenaire for the 100 year anniversary of the Automobile Club of Monaco. Guglielmo Bellasi joined forces with him because of his experience as a F1 constructor. The car was developed over the course of 5 years. In March 1990, Guglielmo Bellasi travelled to Bologna to sign a contract for Lamborghini to supply its V12. In August of that same year, the car was presented to Prince Rainier of Monaco, an avid collector of automobiles. Unfortunately for MCA, the global financial environment meant a lower demand than what was expected for this type of car; only 5 were built between 1990 and 1992.

In 1993, a Georgian based businessman bought the rights for the car and the company and decided to race 'Le Mans' with a renamed Centenaire: MIG M100 (MIG standing for 'Migrelia & Georgia'). The experience was unfortunately a complete failure, not even passing qualification, being at best in 30th position overall behind the race's leader.

== Monte Carlo ==
Méga bought the project and contracted SERA-CD to redesign the car, renamed this time the Monte Carlo. Among other modifications, the Lamborghini engine was replaced with a V12 Mercedes engine. The car was finally presented at the 1996 Geneva Motor Show. The number produced is unknown and is believed to have ceased in 1999.

== Performance ==
Model	Monte Carlo
Power	495 bhp (369 kW) at 5200 rpm
Torque	570 N⋅m (420 lb⋅ft) at 3800 rpm
Max speed	300 km/h (186 mph)
0 to 60 mph (97 km/h)	4.4 seconds
