= Mega Track =

Méga Track
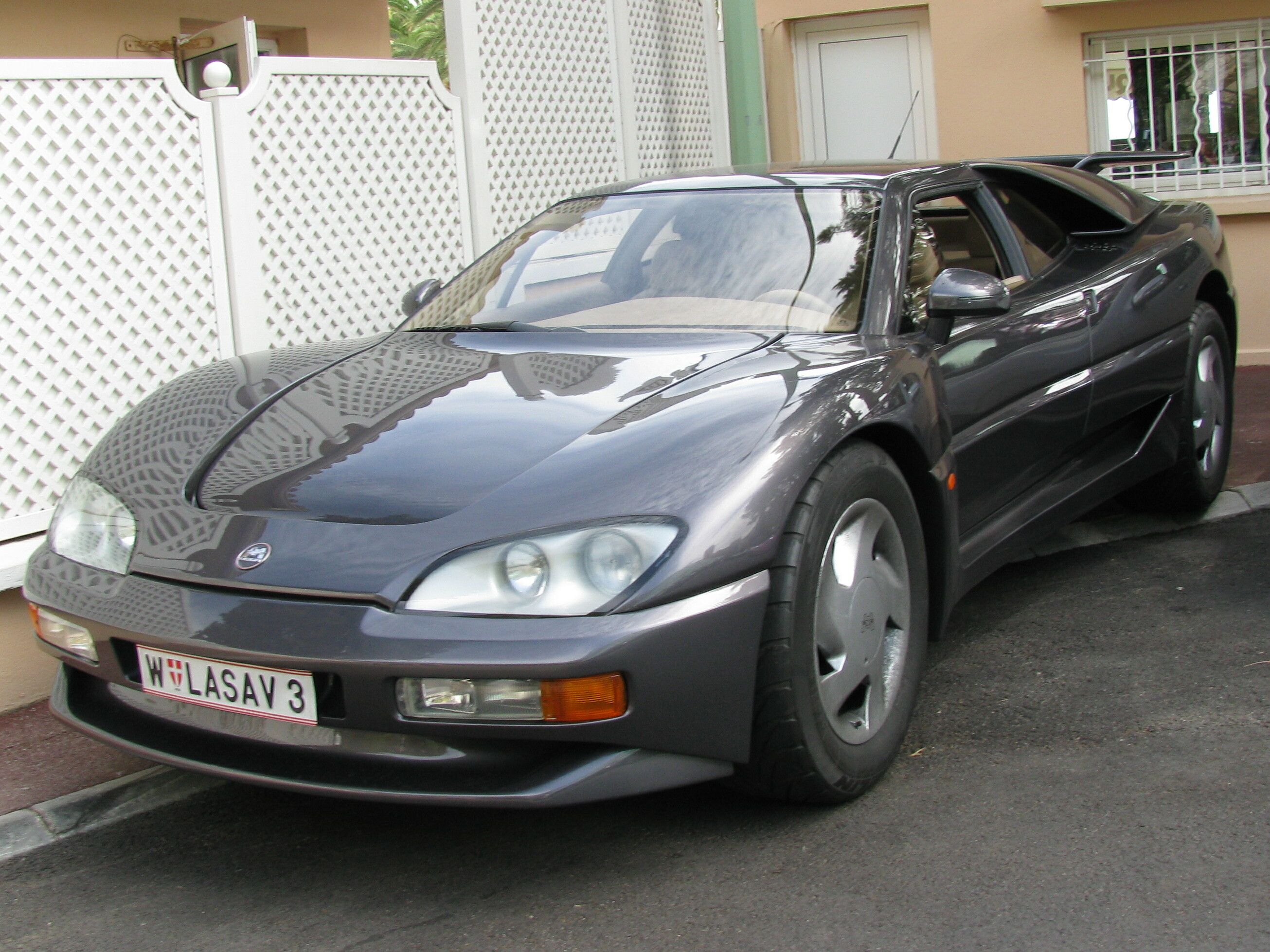

Overview
- Manufacturer: Méga
- Production: 1992–2000

Body and chassis
- Class: Sports car (S)
- Body style: 2-door coupé
- Layout: Rear mid-engine, all-wheel drive

Powertrain
- Engine: 6.0 L (5991 cc) 60° Mercedes-Benz M120 V12
- Transmission: automatic

Dimensions
- Wheelbase: 3,120 mm (123 in)
- Length: 5,080 mm (200 in)
- Width: 2,220 mm (87 in)
- Height: 1,400 mm (55 in)
- Curb weight: 2,280 kg (5,027 lb)

Chronology
- Successor: Mega Monte Carlo

The Mega Track is a sports car manufactured by the French automobile manufacturer Aixam between 1992 and 2000. Only five or six examples were built during this time.

== Overview ==
The concept of the Mega Track was conceived by Georges Blain, the boss of Aixam. At that time, the company specialized in cars that could be driven without a license (so-called light vehicles), but they wanted to diversify, and for this purpose founded the Mega brand, under which Blain wanted to build a super sports car. The project from which the Track emerged began in 1990. The Mega Track was presented at the Paris Motor Show in 1992.

=== Specifications ===
The Mega Track was powered by a 6.0 liter M120 V12 petrol engine from the Mercedes-Benz S600, with an output of 394 PS (290 kW; 389 hp) and 570 N⋅m (420 lbf⋅ft) of torque. Aixam says the Mega Track uses a four-wheel drive system with a 32:68 front/rear power split.

The Mega Track was a sports car that was also intended to be suitable for off-road use, which is why it had height-adjustable suspension. The vehicle can gain up to 34 cm (13 in) of ground clearance in the highest suspension setting. The Mega Track also had large 20-inch tires (285/55 ZR20 at the front and 325/50 ZR20 at the rear), specifically manufactured by Michelin just for this model. The Mega Track's fuel tank holds 110 liters. The taillights of the Mega Track come from the Audi Coupé (B3).

The Mega Track accelerates from 0 to 100 km/h (62 mph) in 5.4 seconds and the top speed is electronically limited to 250 km/h (155 mph).

=== Production ===
Each vehicle was handcrafted in the factory in Aix-les-Bains. In 1992, the price of the Mega Track was 1.7 million francs (excluding taxes). Partly because of this price, the Track was a commercial failure. Apparently only five to six examples were sold worldwide, two of which are now in the Aixam Group headquarters.

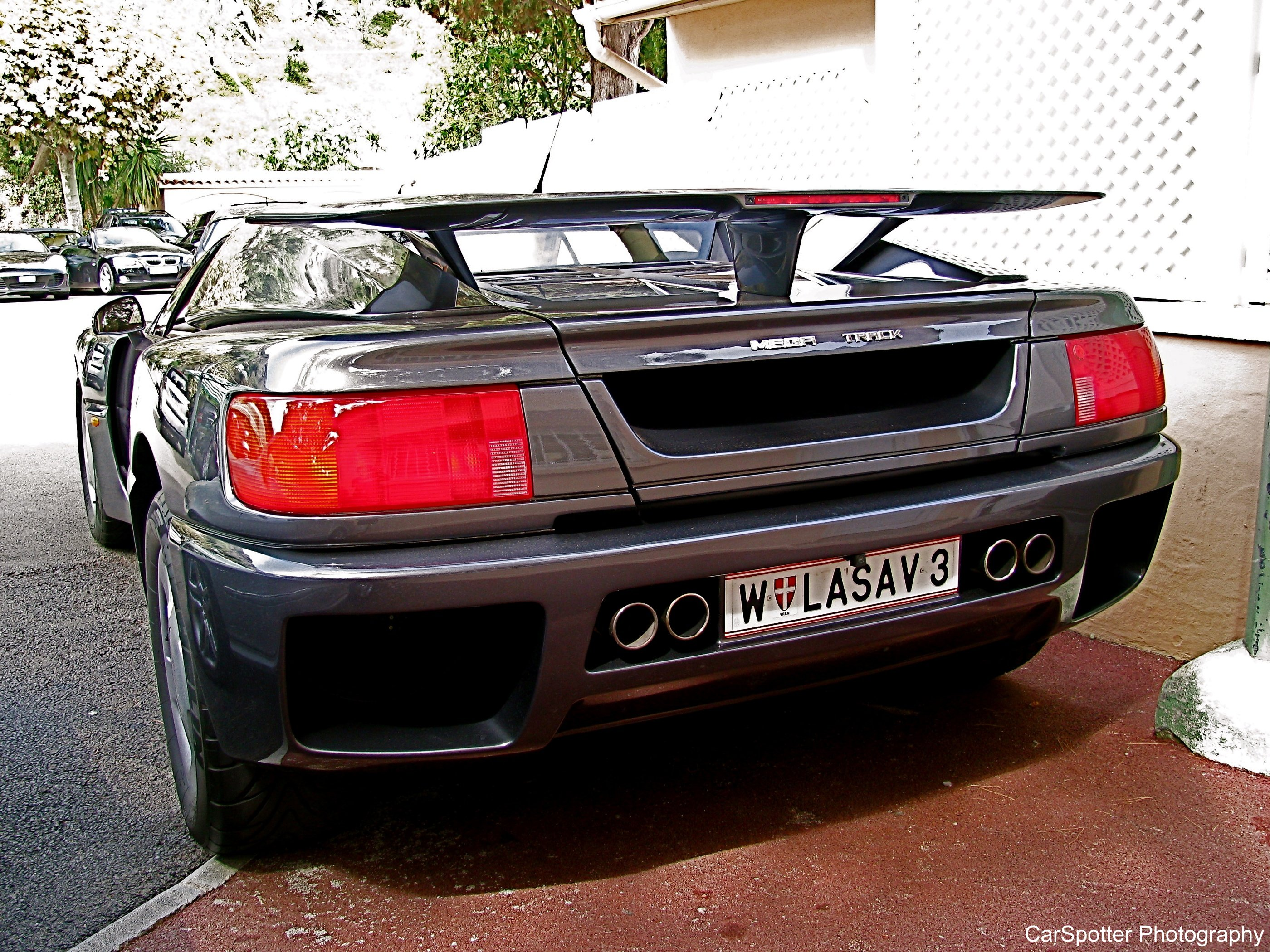
Rear view

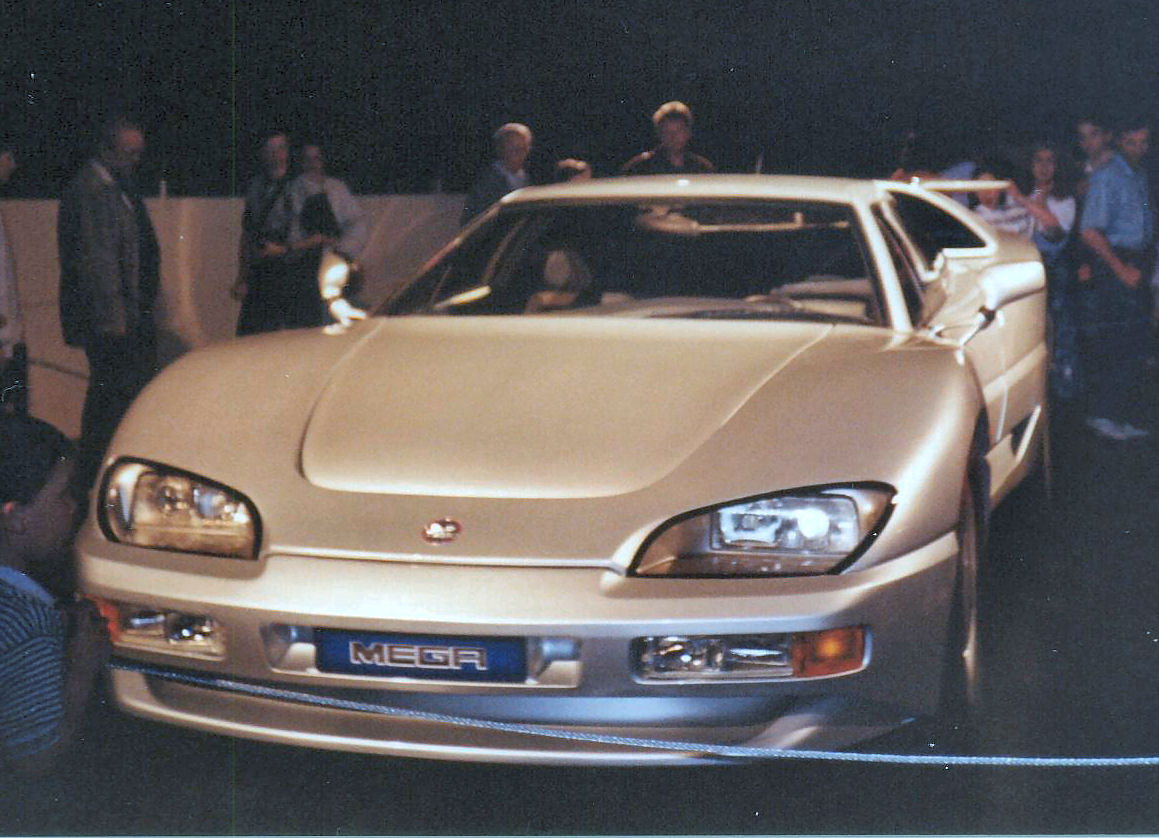
Mega Track at a car show in 1993

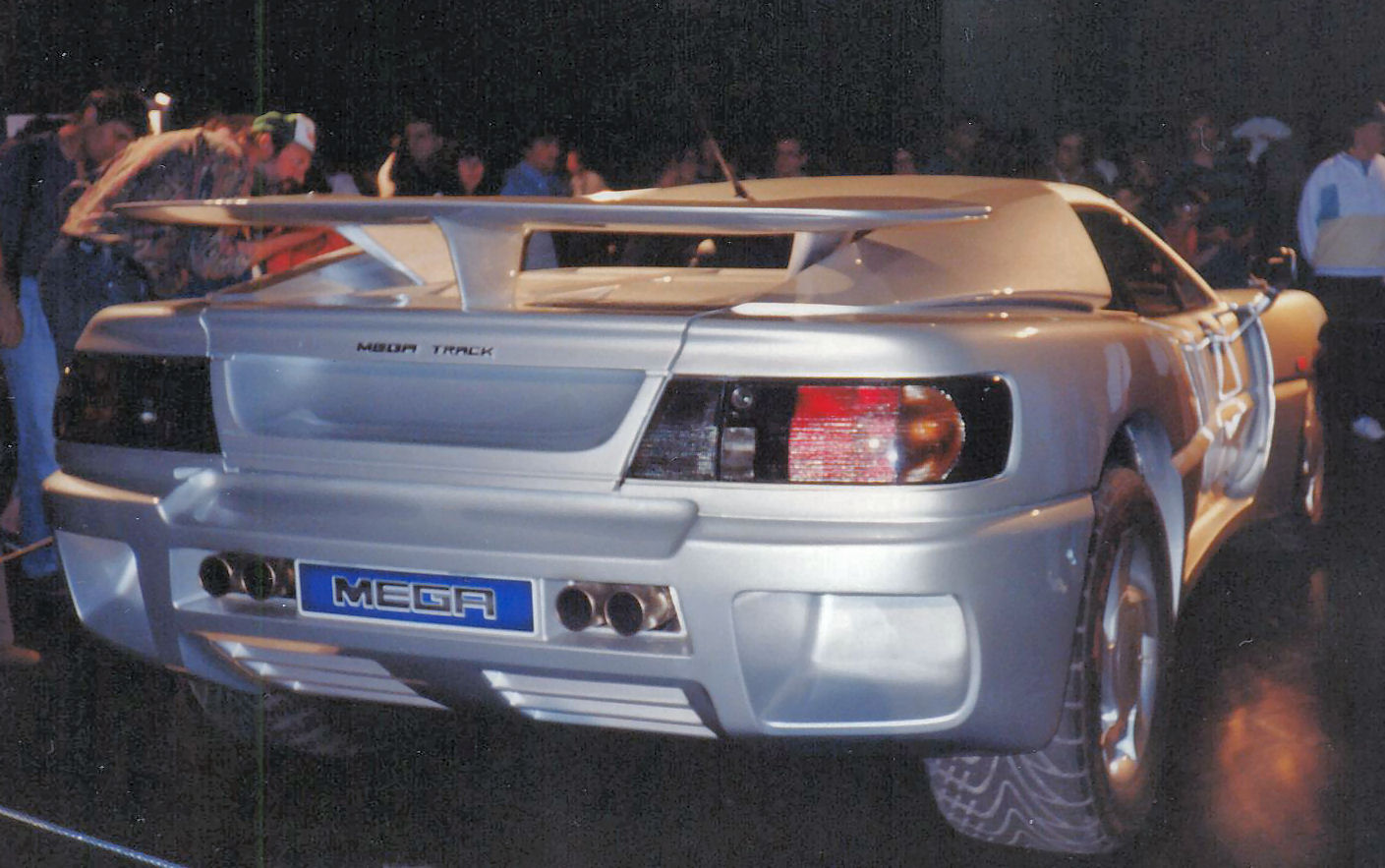
Rear view

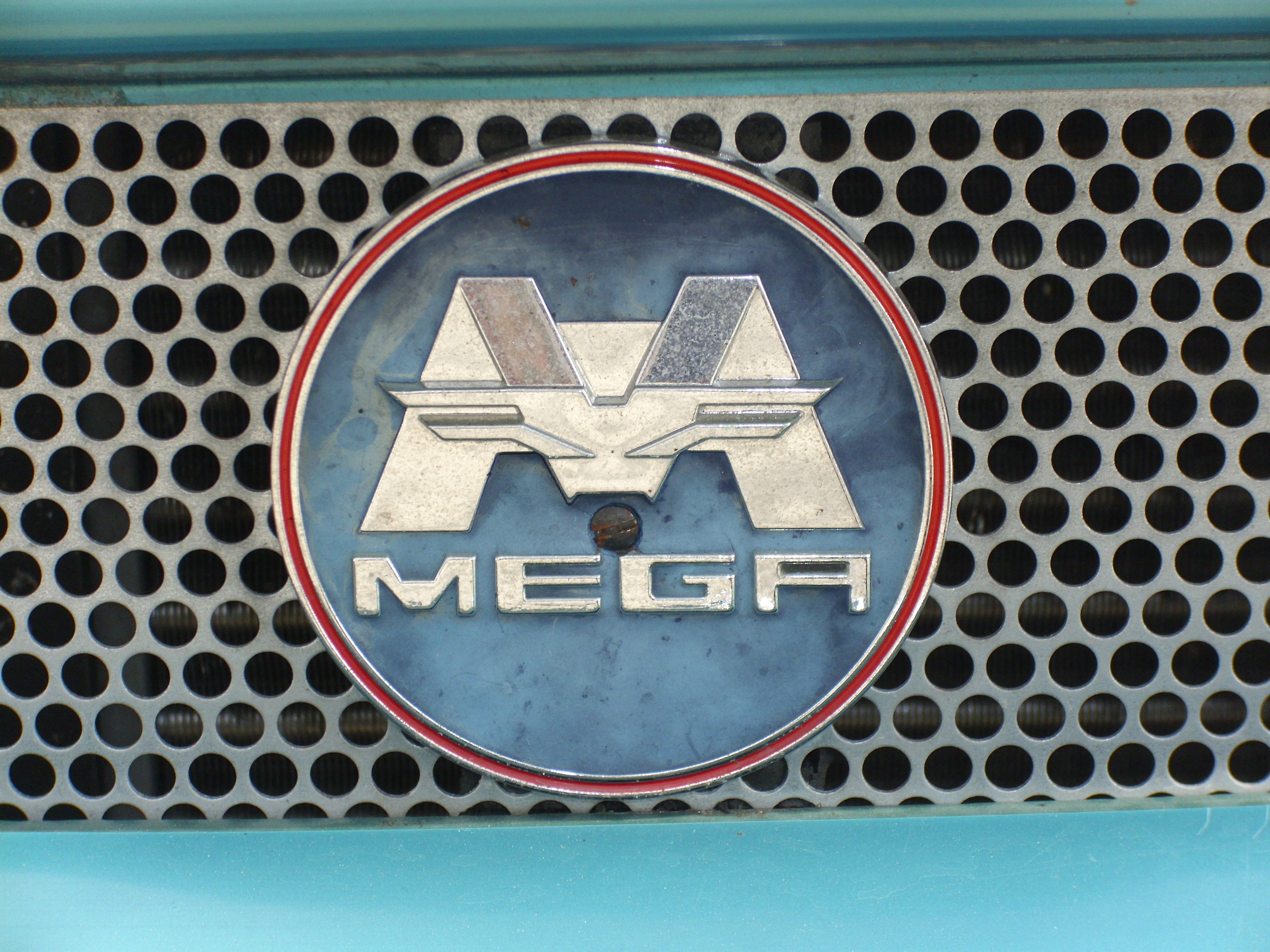
Mega badge
