= Rayttle =

Chinese automobile manufacturer

- Type: Private
- Industry: Automotive
- Founded: September 2014; 12 years ago
- Headquarters: Hangzhou, Zhejiang, China

Rayttle (Chinese: 立通; pinyin: Lì tōng) or Zhejiang Rayttle New Energy Motors (浙江立通新能源) is a Chinese automobile manufacturer headquartered in Hangzhou, Zhejiang, China, that specializes in developing low-speed electric vehicle or neighborhood electric vehicles.

== History ==
Rayttle was founded in September 2014, and is based in Hangzhou.

Their first vehicles was the E28, which came out in 2016. The E28 is also called the E18. It has a 9.9 kWh battery, 5 horsepower, and a 75-mile range. It comes in E28Pro and E28Max versions. The E28Pro has a 3.5 kW motor and the E28Max has a 4 kW motor. Its dimensions are 2650 mm/1240 mm/1510 mm, a wheelbase of 1884 mm, a weight 600 kg, and costs ¥36,000. It is an unlicensed copy of the Renault Twizy.

== Vehicles ==
=== Current models ===
Rayttle has 1 production vehicle.

Model	Photo	Specifications
Rayttle E28		Body style: Microcar Class: Quadricycle Doors: 2 Seats: 2 Battery: 9.9 kWh Production: 2016 Revealed: 2017

== See also ==
- Renault
- Renault Twizy
- ThunderPower
- Aixam
- Ligier
