= Toyota FT-Me =

Japanese concept vehicle

Overview
- Manufacturer: Toyota
- Production: 2025

Body and chassis
- Body style: 2-door quadricycle

The Toyota FT-Me is a battery-electric micromobility concept vehicle developed by Toyota Motor Europe. It was unveiled in March 2025 as part of Toyota's research into compact urban transportation solutions. The vehicle is designed to fit within the European quadricycle category and is intended for short-distance urban travel.

== Background ==
The FT-Me was introduced as part of Toyota's broader strategy to explore alternative mobility formats in response to increasing urban congestion and emissions regulations. The concept forms part of Toyota's "Mobility for All" initiative, which aims to expand access to personal transport for different user groups, including younger drivers and people with reduced mobility.

== Design ==
The FT-Me is a two-seat vehicle measuring under 2.5 metres in length and its compact footprint allows it to occupy less parking space than conventional passenger cars. The exterior design incorporates high-contrast black and white body panels. Toyota has stated that the styling was inspired by a protective helmet, with an emphasis on visibility and perceived safety.

The cabin is configured for two occupants and features simplified controls. Toyota has indicated that the steering interface can be adapted for hand-control operation, enabling use by drivers with certain physical disabilities without modification. The vehicle also incorporates smartphone integration for access and system functions.

== Technical concept ==
The FT-Me is powered by an electric drivetrain. Toyota has not released detailed technical specifications, including motor output or battery capacity.The concept includes a roof-mounted solar panel designed to supplement the vehicle's energy supply. Under favourable conditions, Toyota estimates this could add approximately 20–30 kilometres of daily driving range.

The vehicle has been designed to use a high proportion of recycled materials. Toyota states this approach is intended to reduce the vehicle's overall environmental footprint compared to larger electric vehicles.

== Classification and intended use ==
Toyota has indicated that the FT-Me is designed to meet European quadricycle regulations. In some European countries, vehicles in this category may be driven by individuals as young as 14 with appropriate licensing, depending on national regulations. The FT-Me is intended primarily for short-range urban travel.

== Development status ==
As of 2026, the FT-Me remains a concept vehicle and Toyota has not confirmed production plans. Reports indicate that feasibility studies have been conducted in the United Kingdom with government funding support to assess potential limited production, including evaluation of materials and manufacturing processes.

== Reception ==
The FT-Me has been noted in automotive media as part of a growing segment of micro electric vehicles designed for urban environments. Comparisons have been made to other quadricycle-class vehicles, including the Citroën Ami and similar low-speed urban EVs.
