= Mobilize Duo =

Two-seater electric vehicle by Renault

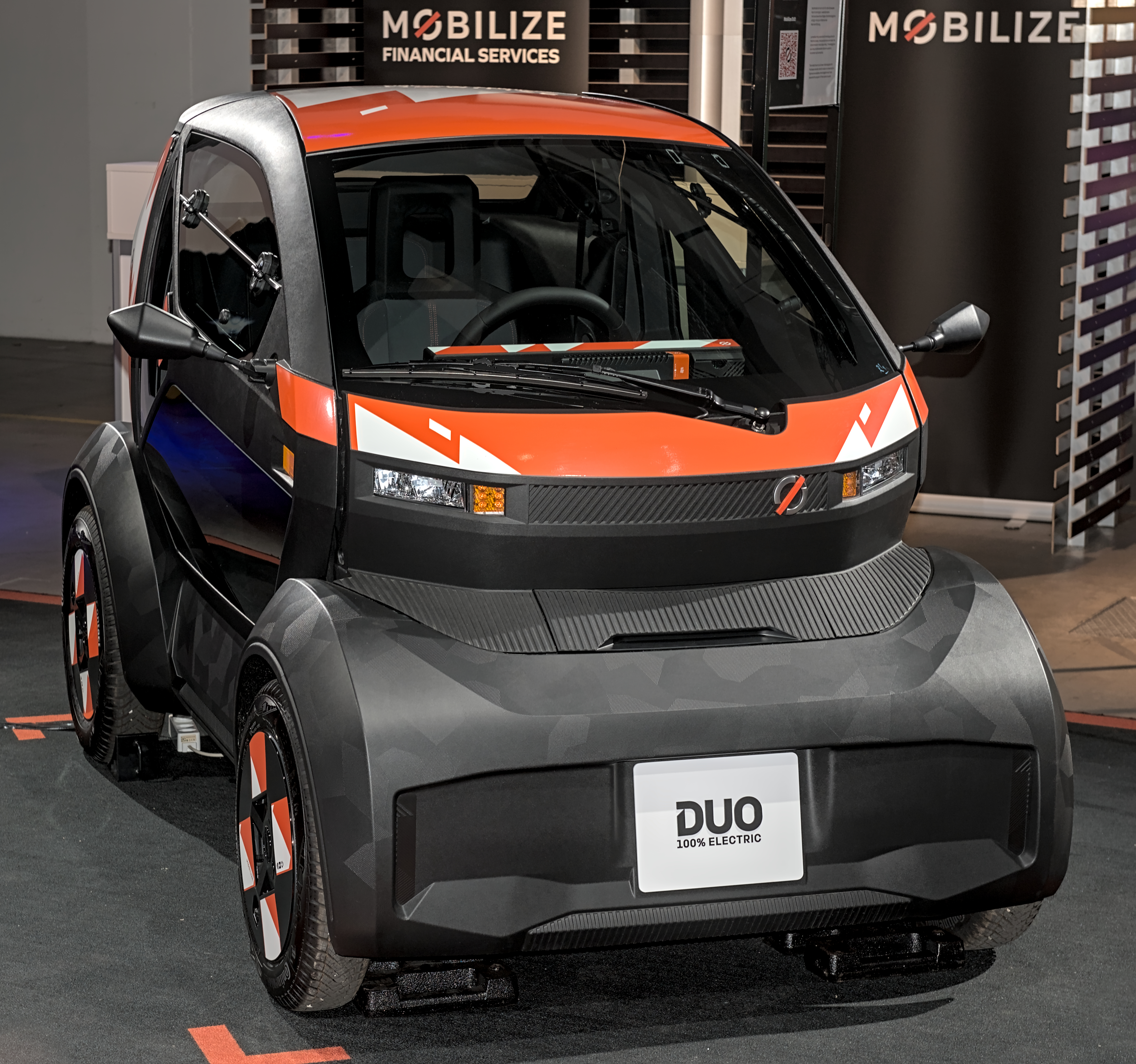

Overview
- Manufacturer: Mobilize (Renault)
- Also called: Mobilize Bento (cargo version)
- Production: 2024–2025
- Assembly: Morocco: Tangier (Renault Med)
- Designer: Jean-Philippe Salar (Design Director); Benjamin Armisen (Project Leader); Bernard Pierre (Vehicle Design Project Manager); Éric Diemert (Design Project Director)

Body and chassis
- Class: Microcar
- Body style: 2-door quadricycle
- Layout: Rear-motor, rear-wheel-drive
- Doors: Dihedral synchro-helix

Powertrain
- Electric motor: ISKRA asynchronous motor

Dimensions
- Length: 2,430 mm (95.7 in)
- Width: 1,300 mm (51.2 in)
- Height: 1,460 mm (57.5 in)

Chronology
- Predecessor: Renault Twizy

The Mobilize Duo is a two-seater electric quadricycle that replaced the Renault Twizy in 2023, which was unveiled at the 2022 Paris Motor Show. First previewed as the Mobilize EZ-1 concept in 2021, it was eventually renamed to its current name and shown at the 2021 Viva Tech event. A cargo version, named the Mobilize Bento, was announced with a 1 m^{3} (1.3 cu yd) load area.

In 2024, it was announced that the Duo and Bento models would be available in the United Kingdom and go on sale in 2025.

In December 2025, Renault ended production of the Duo and eliminated 80 of 450 positions at Mobilize due to 'limited profitability' shifting the company's main focus to the development of electric vehicle charging solutions.

== Gallery ==
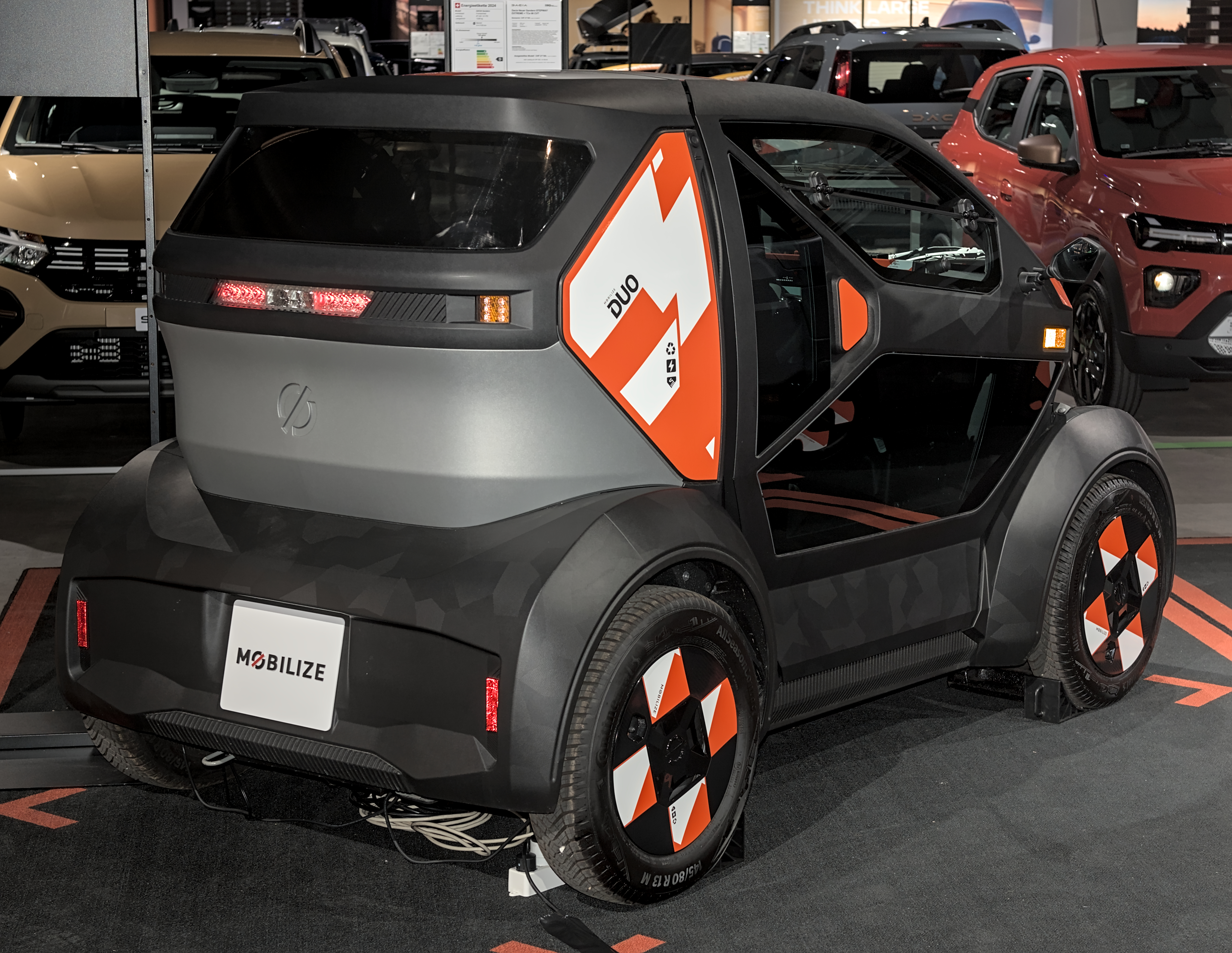
Rear view

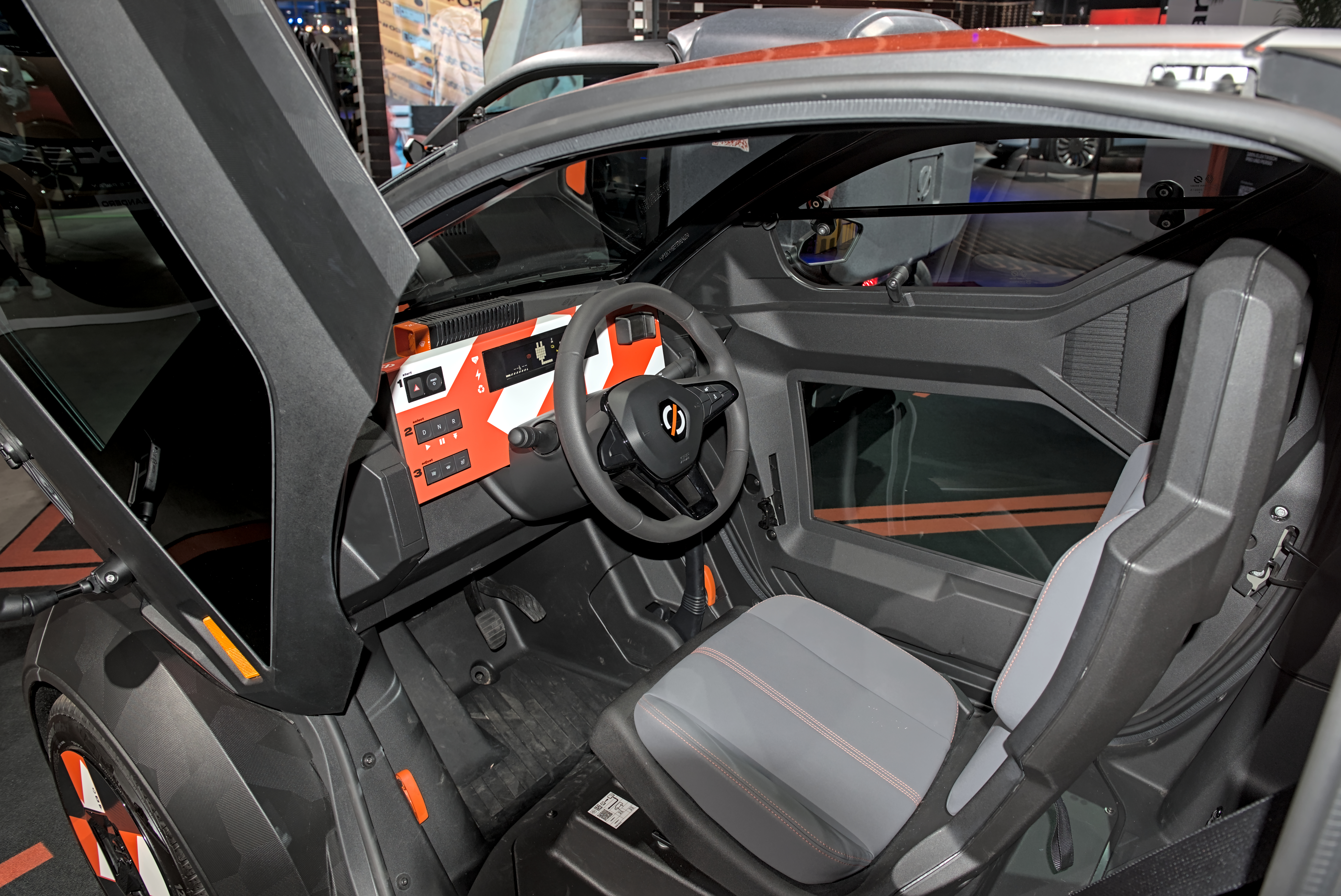
Interior

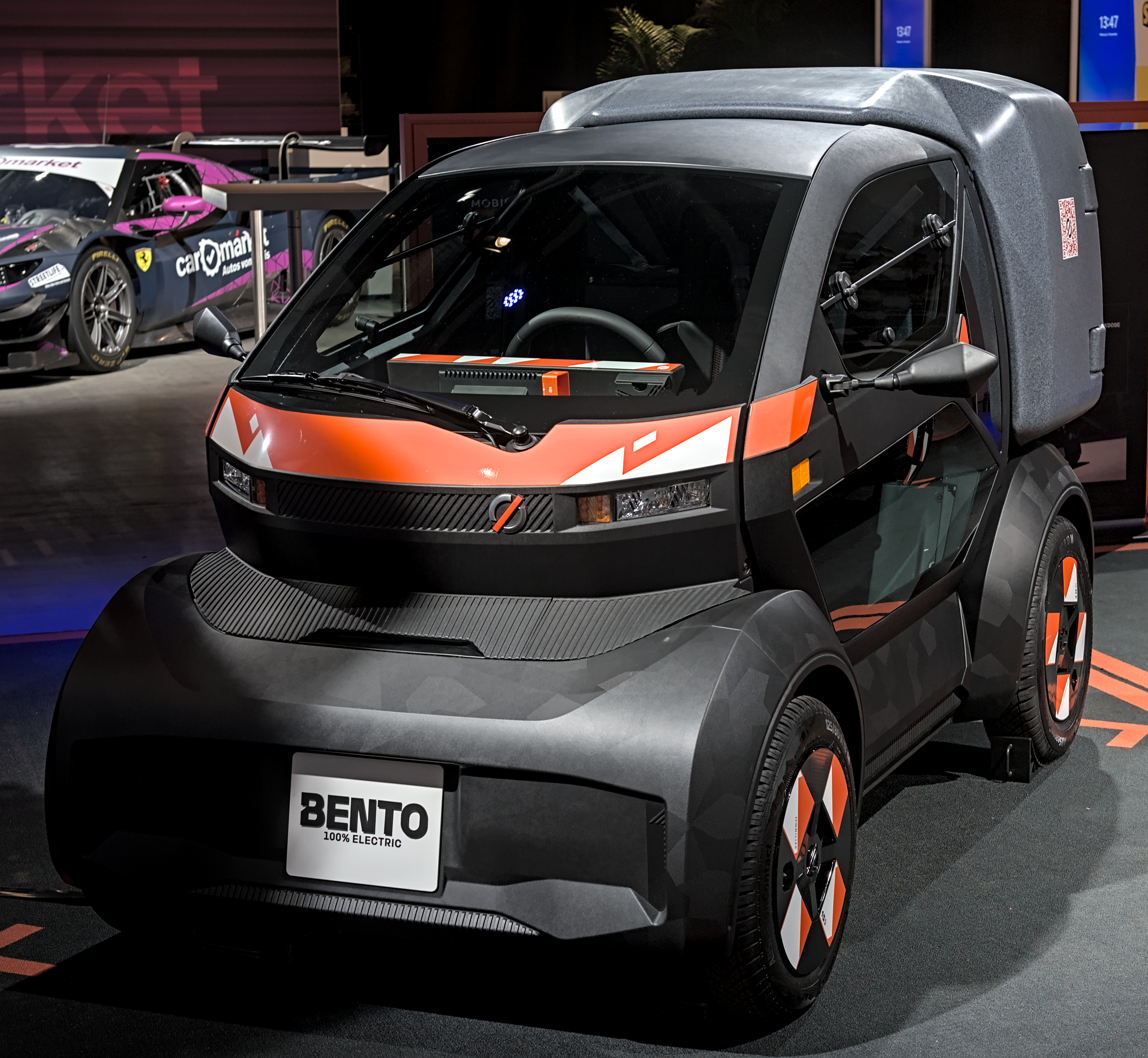
Mobilize Bento

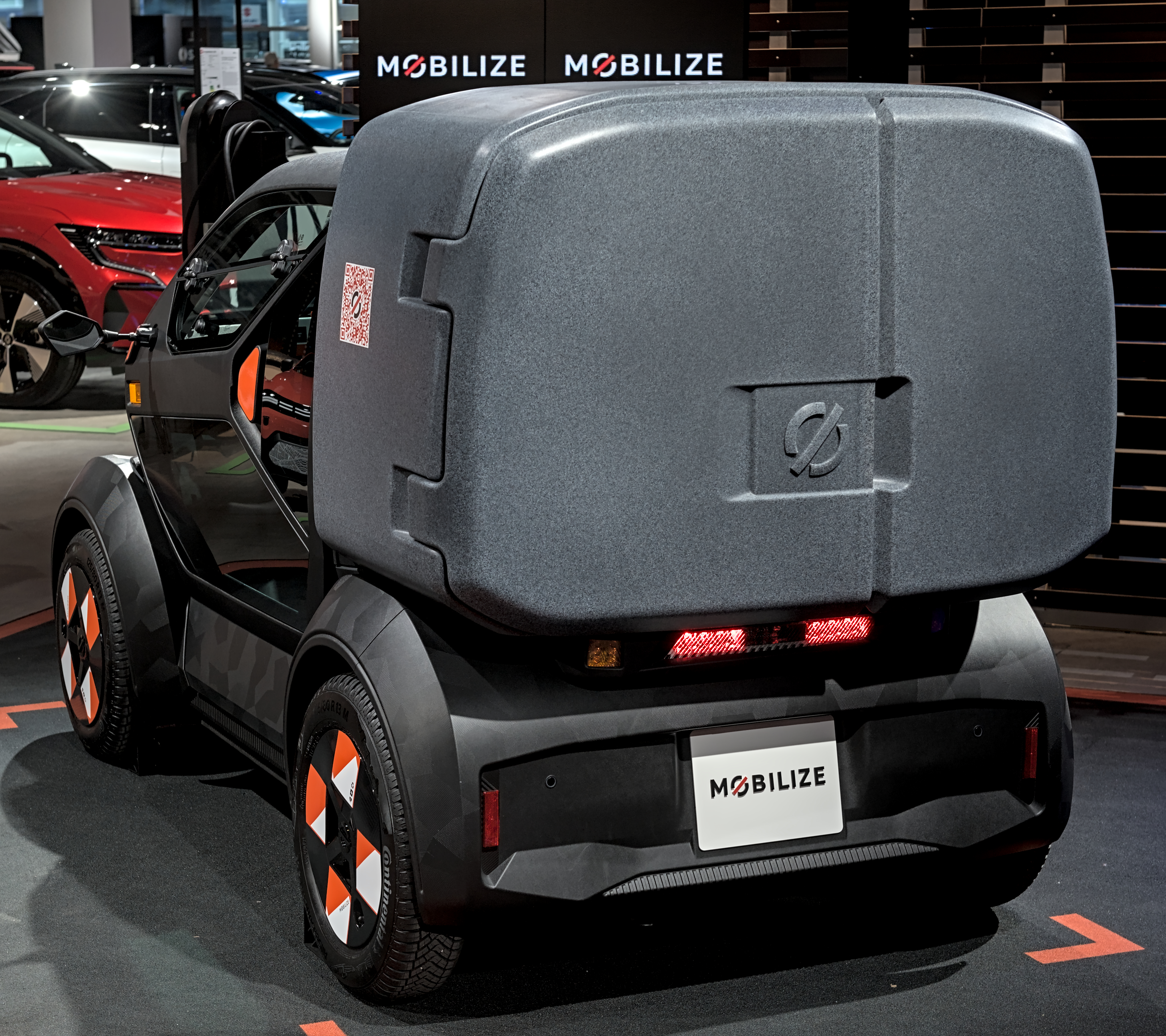
Rear view

== Sales ==
Year	Duo	Bento
2023	43	
2024	380	40
2025	3077	4
