= Renault Twizy =

Two-seat electric car

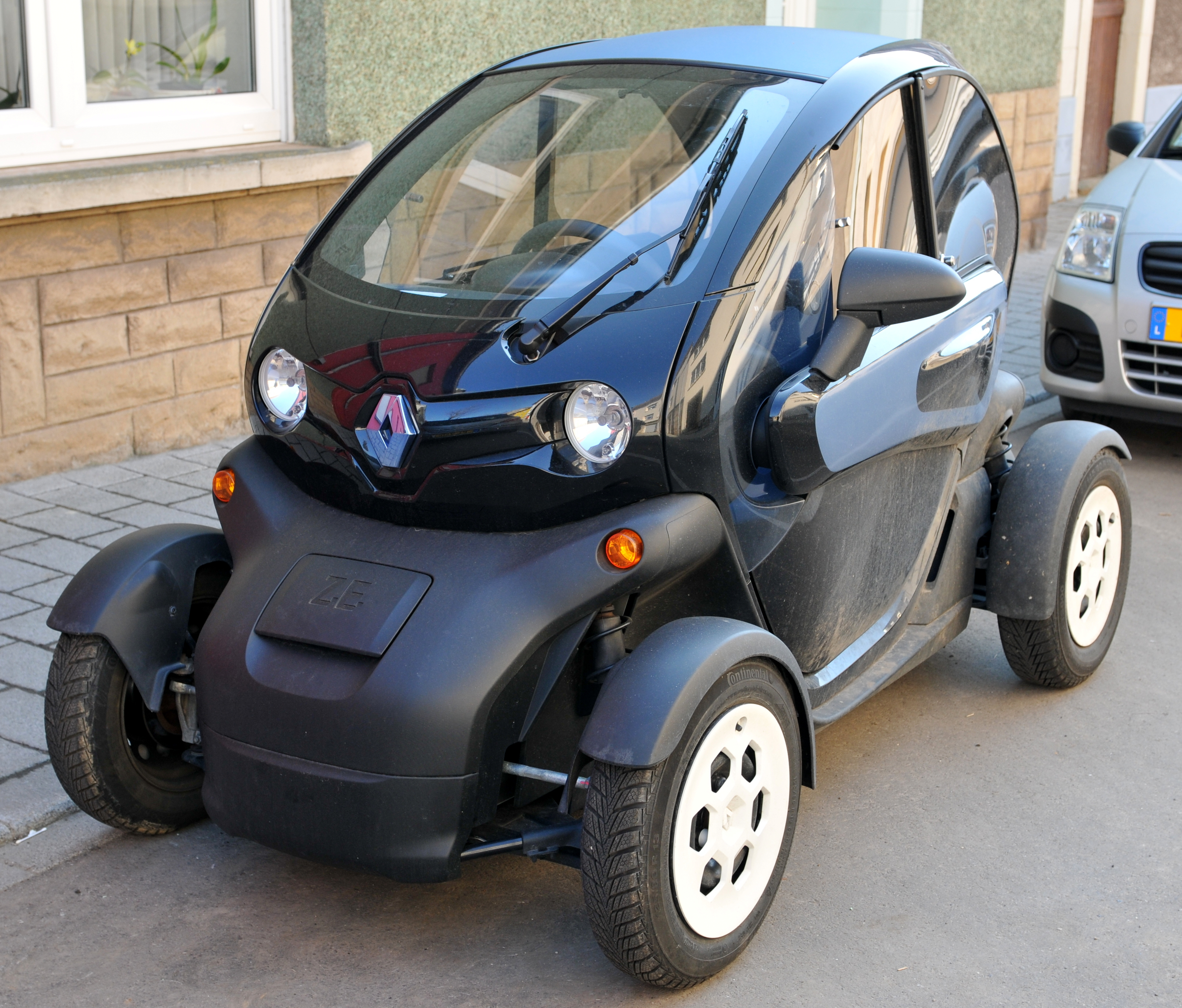

Overview
- Manufacturer: Renault
- Also called: Nissan New Mobility Concept (Japan)
- Production: April 2012 – September 2023
- Assembly: Spain (2012–2018): Valladolid (Renault Spain); South Korea (2019–2023): Busan (Dongshin Motech OEM in Renault Samsung Motors Transaxle Factory)
- Designer: François Leboine, Eduardo Lana

Body and chassis
- Class: Microcar quadricycle Kei car (Japan)
- Body style: 2-door quadricycle
- Layout: Rear-engine, rear-wheel-drive
- Doors: Scissor

Powertrain
- Electric motor: ISKRA asynchronous motor
- Transmission: Single gear
- Battery: 6.1 kWh lithium-ion battery
- Electric range: 90 km (56 mi) (NEDC)

Dimensions
- Wheelbase: 1,686 mm (66.4 in)
- Length: 2,338 mm (92.0 in)
- Width: 1,234 mm (48.6 in)
- Height: 1,454 mm (57.2 in)
- Curb weight: 450 kg (992 lb)

Chronology
- Successor: Mobilize Duo (Europe)

The Renault Twizy is a two-seat electric microcar designed and marketed by Renault. It is classified in Europe as either a light or heavy quadricycle depending on the output power, which is either 4 kW (5.4 hp) for the 45 model or 13 kW (17 hp) for the 80 model, both names reflecting its top speed in km/h. Originally manufactured in Valladolid, Spain, production was moved to Busan in South Korea in March 2019 to meet increased demand in Asia. In July 2023 it was announced that production of the Twizy was to end in September 2023; it is to be replaced by the new Mobilize Duo.

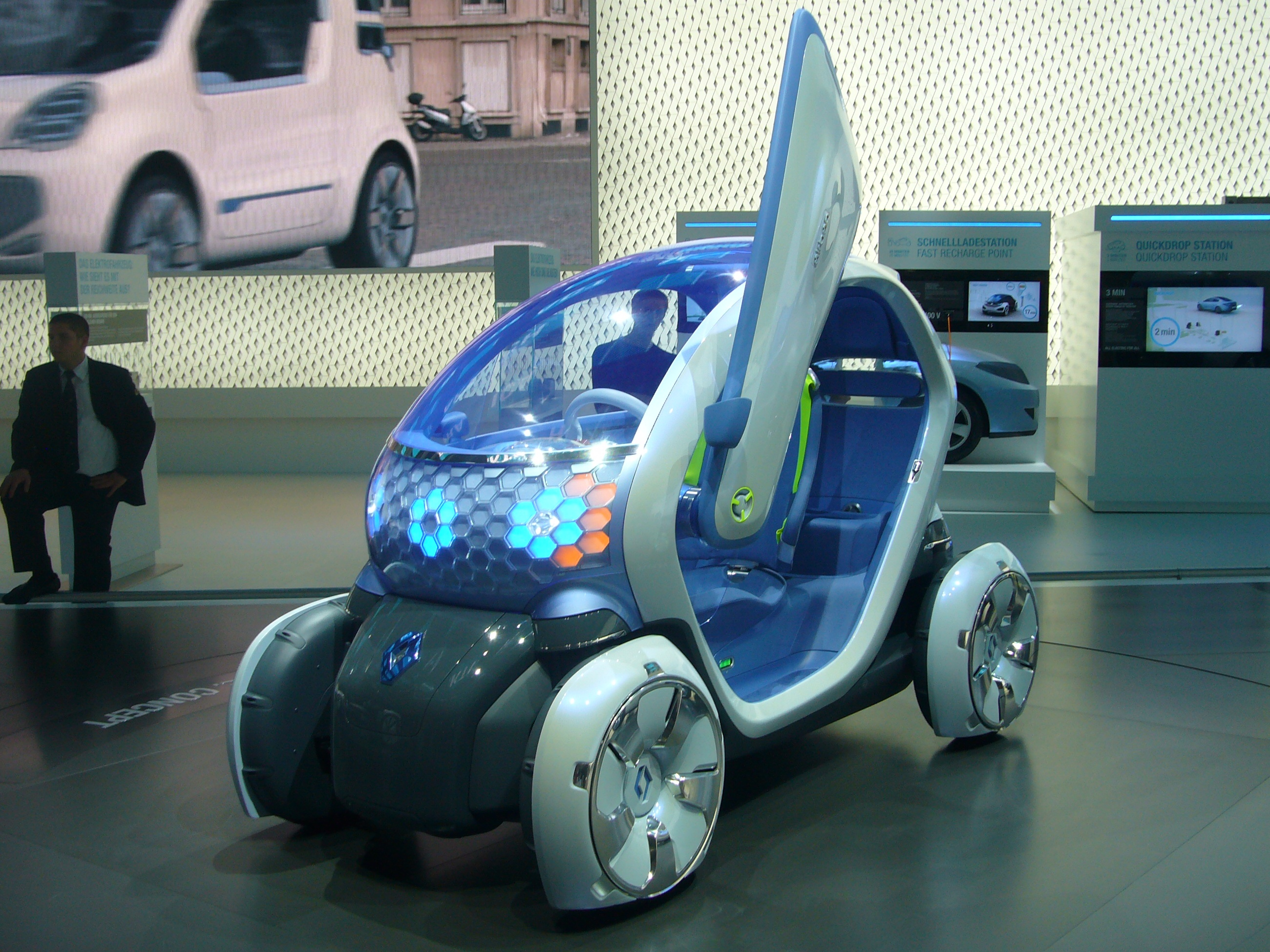
The 2009 concept

The Twizy debuted as a concept car at the 2009 Frankfurt Motor Show and was designed by Françoise Leboinne and Luciano Bove. In November 2010, Nissan announced a rebadged variant to the Twizy, called the New Mobility Concept, or NMC. It was also displayed as a concept with Renault Samsung badging at the 2011 Seoul Motor Show, although it was branded as a Renault in South Korea for production. In May 2011, Renault announced they would produce the Twizy and began taking reservations.

In March 2012, the Twizy was released to the French market, followed a month later by several other European countries. Available in three models, the Twizy sales price does not include the battery pack, which is leased for a monthly fee that includes roadside assistance and a battery replacement guarantee. In 2020, the Twizy became available as a direct purchase in the UK, no longer requiring the battery rental.

The Twizy was the top-selling plug-in electric vehicle in Europe during 2012. The milestone of 15,000 Twizys sold worldwide was achieved in April 2015. Global cumulative sales totaled 29,118 units through December 2019, with Europe as its main market.

== Specifications ==
=== Construction and safety ===
The Twizy is an ultra-compact vehicle, with a length of 2.32 metres (7 ft 7 in), a width of 1.19 metres (3 ft 11 in) and a height of 1.46 metres (4 ft 9 in).

The vehicle's frame and body offer occupants extra protection with its deformable structure, while the outboard position of the four wheels and the lateral beams located either side of the chassis provide protection in case of a side impact. The safety retention systems include a driver's airbag, a four-point safety belt at the front and a three-point one at the rear.

The Twizy may be winterized with winter tires and adding flexi side windows to enclose the cabin. Heating would be provided by plugging in electric blankets to keep the driver warm.

=== Models ===
The Twizy model is all-electric, part of Renault's Zero Emissions program.

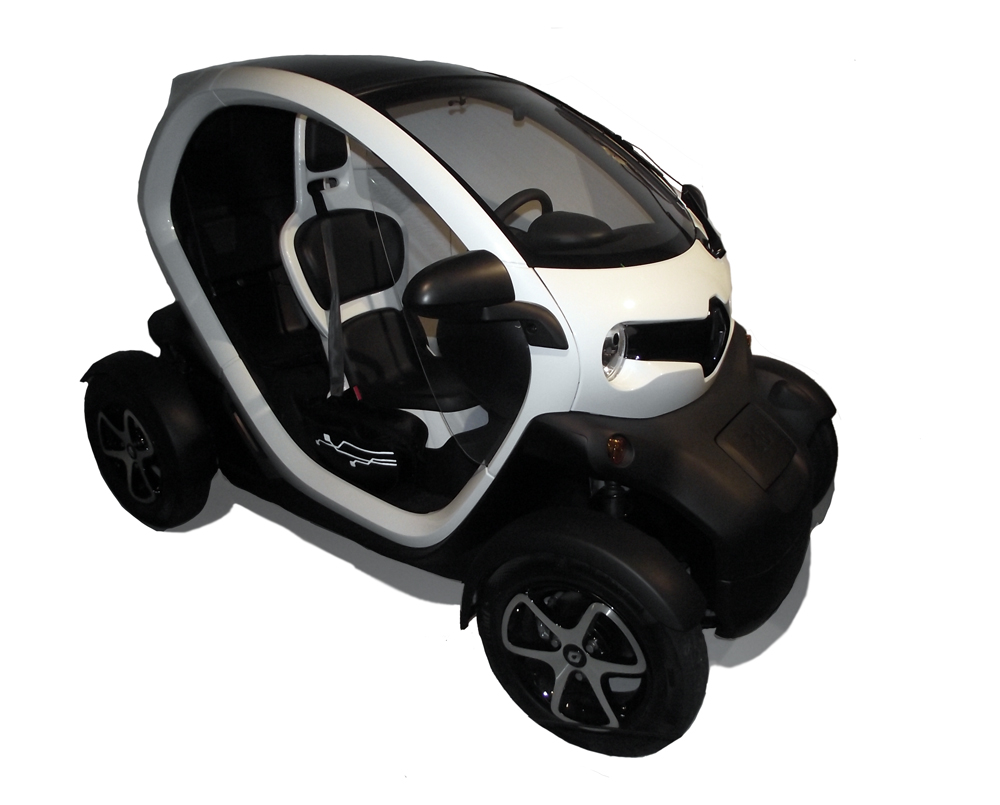
Twizy Technic – doors are optional.

==== Twizy Urban ====
===== Twizy Urban 45 =====
The Twizy range starts with the light quadricycle-classed Urban 45 that was originally priced at €6,990 in Europe with a monthly battery lease charge of €50. The price has since been raised to around €10,300 exc. VAT but now includes the battery. It has a motor power of 4 kW (5.4 PS), a maximum speed of 45 km/h (28 mph) and can thus be driven in most European countries by drivers from 14 years old with a special driving licence (France, Italy, Spain) or with a moped licence (Belgium, Germany, Netherlands, Sweden, Austria, Finland, Slovenia).

===== Twizy Urban 80 =====
The heavy quadricycle-classed Urban 80 model features a 13 kW (17.7 PS) electric motor and can drive up to 80 km/h (50 mph).

==== Twizy Colour and Technic ====
The Colour model is a colourful and 'fun' Twizy available for both the 45 and 80 trims.

The Technic model brings additional design elements while sharing the technical features with the Urban. It is available for both the 45 and 80 trims.

==== Twizy Cargo ====
In June 2013, Renault announced the introduction of the Twizy Cargo, a model designed for hauling goods. The space destined for the seat of the second passenger was replaced with a cargo box with a volume of 180 L (6.4 cu ft) and maximum weight capacity of 75 kg (165 lb).

The Cargo 45 has 4 kW (5.4 PS) of power and top speed is limited to 45 km/h (28 mph).The car only has one seat and there is a larger space behind the driver to store goods.

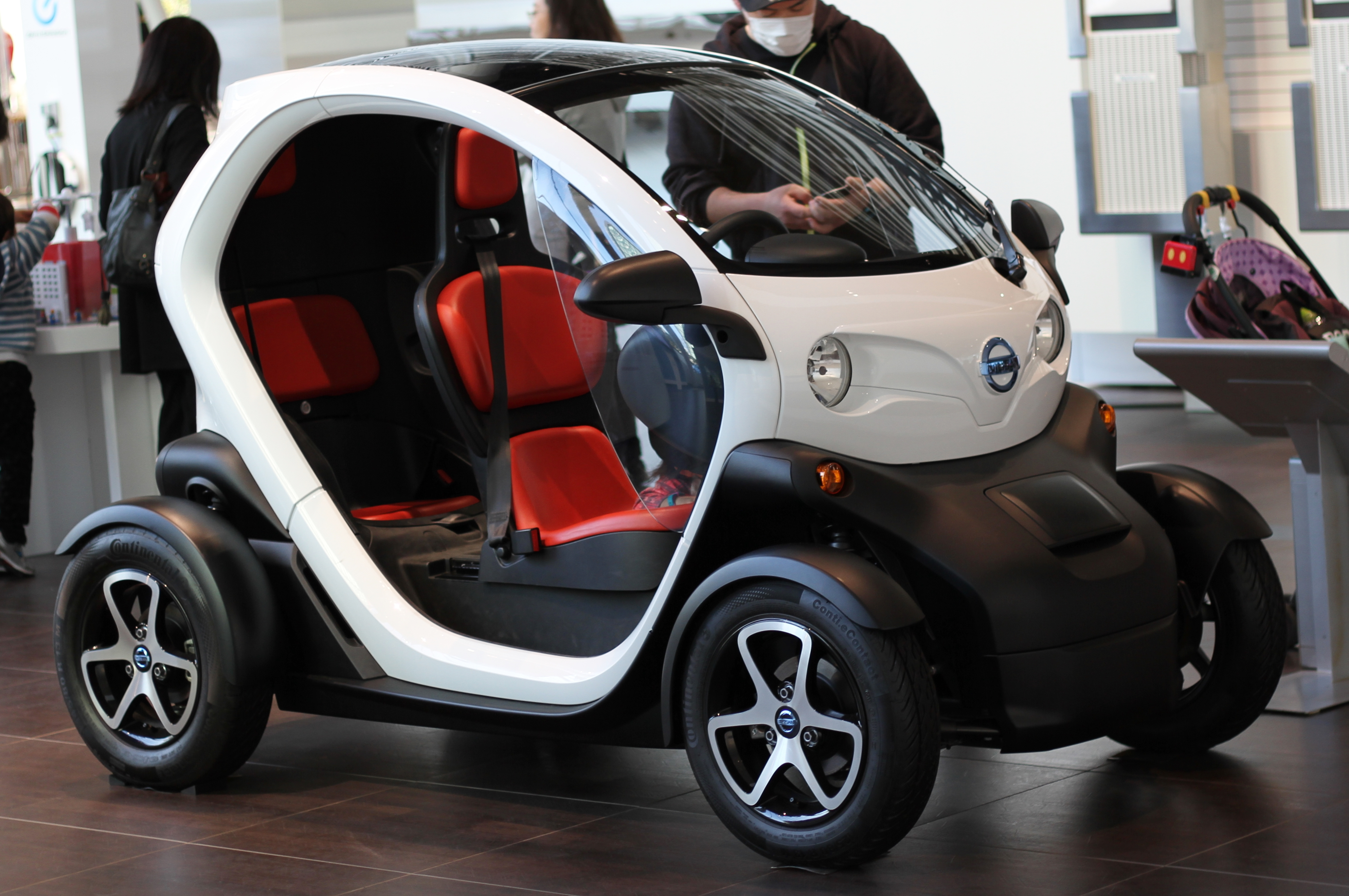
The Nissan New Mobility Concept, a rebadged version of the Twizy, was deployed for the "Choimobi Yokohama" carsharing program in Japan in 2013.

The Cargo 80 delivers a top speed of 80 km/h (50 mph).

==== Nissan NMC ====
A rebadged version of the Twizy was launched in Japan as the Nissan New Mobility Concept (NMC). The electric vehicle was deployed in Yokohama on 11 October 2013 for service on a one-way carsharing program called "Choimobi Yokohama" (Choimobi means "easy mobility" in Japanese). During its first month on the market, over 2700 customers signed up for the service. A total of 45 units were registered through the end of October 2013. The NMC is classified as a kei car due to the car's dimensions and as such is equipped with yellow license plates.

The Nissan-badged version was also used by Scoot, an American scooter sharing company, as a pilot for car-sharing operation in San Francisco.

==== Twizy F1 ====
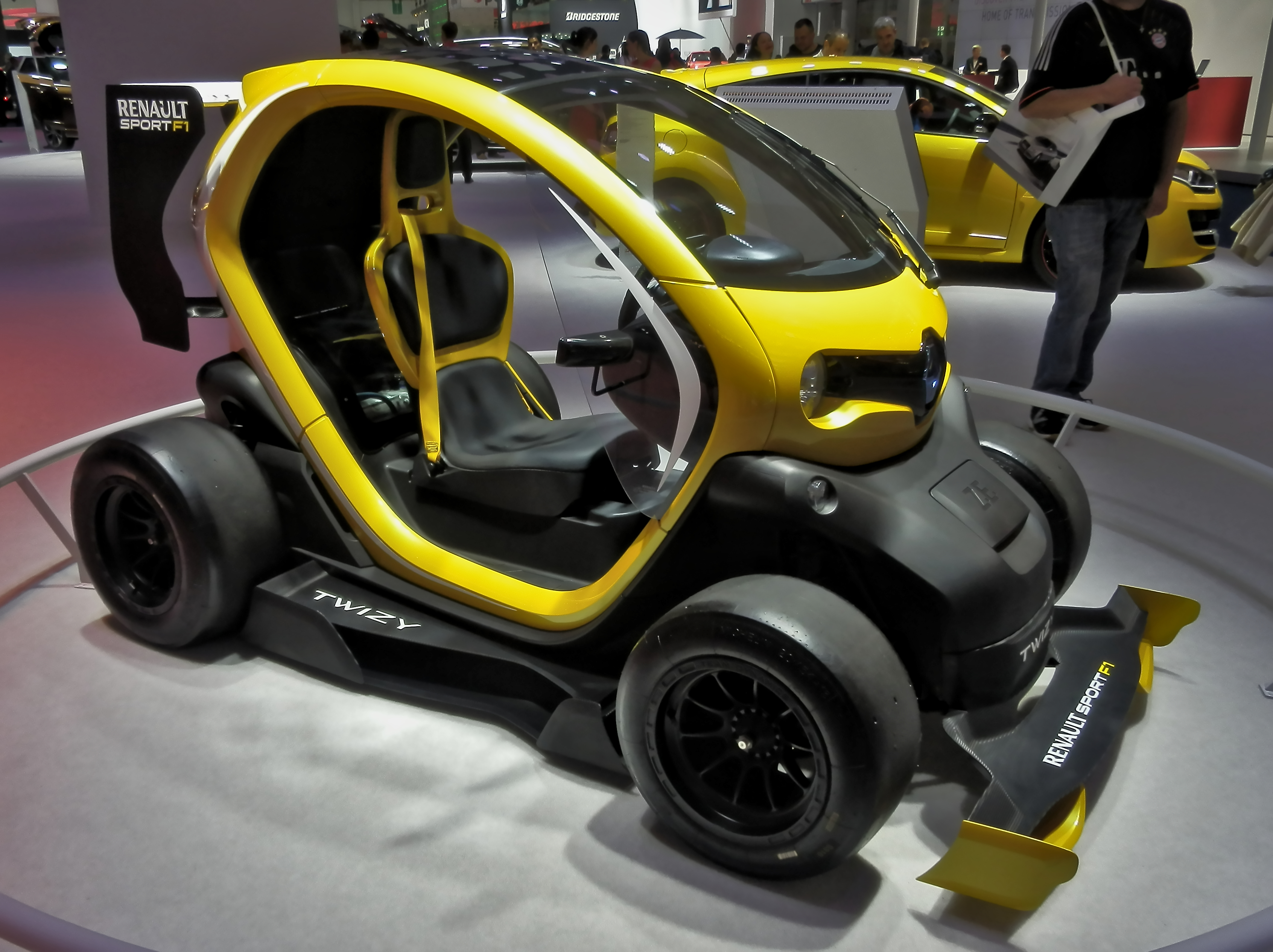
2013 Twizy F1

Following the footsteps of Renault Espace F1, in April 2013, Renault Sport exhibited the Twizy F1, a concept version of the car that featured Formula One technologies such as KERS. The KERS system and an upgraded electric motor boosted the car's power to 72 kW (97.9 PS), allowing to accelerate at comparable times with the Renault Sport Mégane R.S. 265 and reaching speeds up to 109 km/h (68 mph). The car is equipped with various open-wheel aerodynamic and other racing parts, including tyres from a Formula Renault 2.0 car and steering wheel from a Formula Renault 3.5 car.

==== Twizy Delivery Concept ====
The Twizy Delivery Concept was developed from the VELUD project with École d'ingénieurs généralistes La Rochelle, Airparif, La Petite Reine Groupe Stars Service and the City of Paris for last-mile deliveries beginning in 2014. It consisted of a Twizy with shortened rear bodywork and an additional 2-wheeled trailer-like module for carrying containers sizing up to 1 cubic metre (35 cu ft), forming a six-wheeled box-truck like vehicle. It was used in experimental test phases in Paris.

=== Battery ===
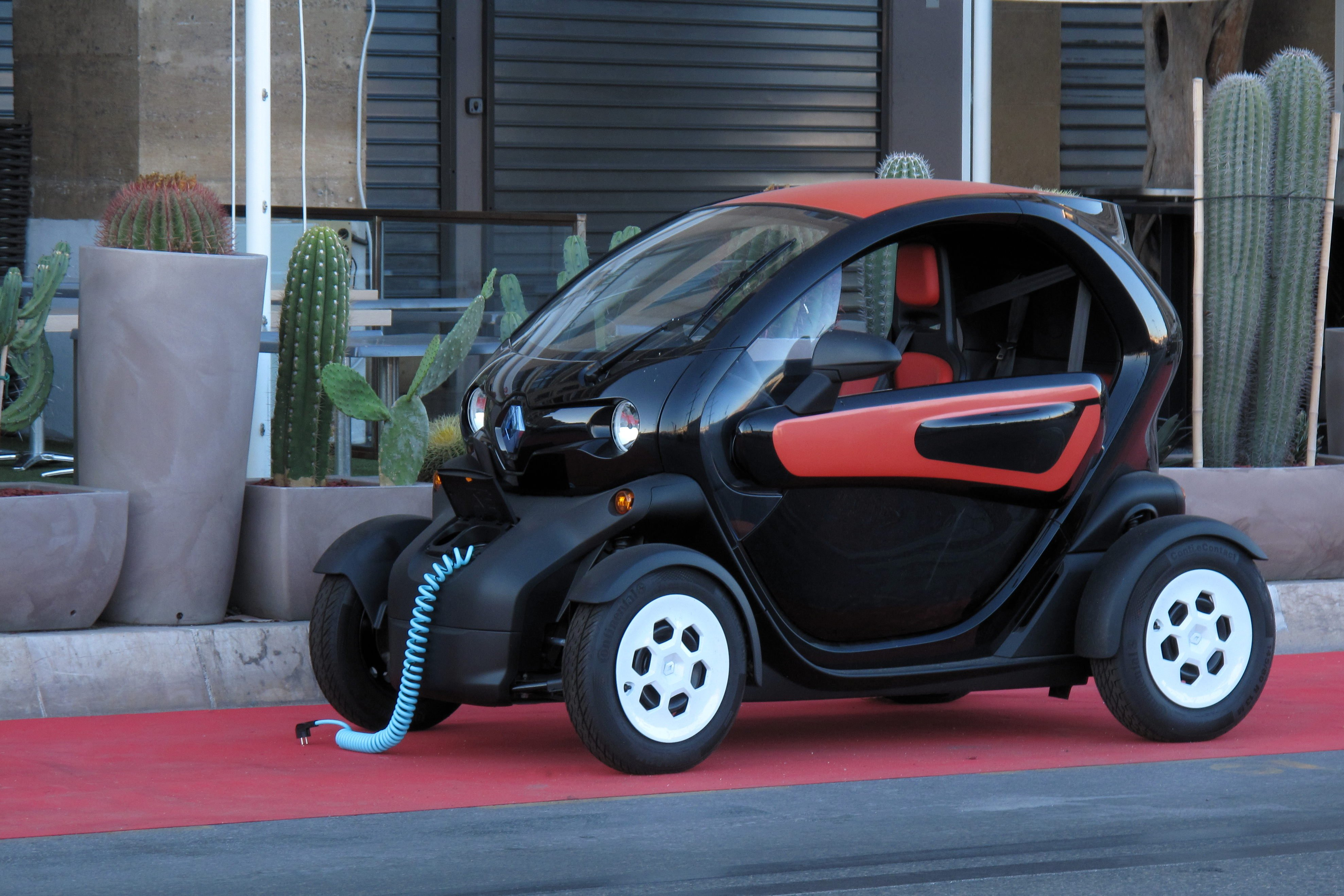
Twizy with charging wire out

The 6.1 kWh (22 MJ) lithium-ion battery is located underneath the front seat. Both motor variants carry the same weight of 474 kg (1,045 lb), including batteries of 100 kg (220 lb). The range is homologated at 100 km (62 mi). In real conditions, Renault announces around 80 km (50 mi). At high speed and no eco-driving the Twizy's range is about 50 km (31 mi).

The battery can be charged with an extendable spiral cable stored beneath a flap at the front of the vehicle. The integrated charger is compatible with roadside battery charging facilities as well as the standard 220-240 V 10 A household electrical supply. Charging an empty battery takes around three-and-a-half hours.

A planned Renault battery plant near Paris was delayed due to technical constraints. Construction will start in the second quarter of 2012 and production of batteries is expected to begin in 2014 or 2015. In the meantime Renault intends to buy batteries for its EV range from a joint venture between Nissan and NEC as well as LG Chem of South Korea.

Twizy is only supplied with LG Chem modules. Batteries are assembled in Renault Valladolid plant.

== Safety ==
The Twizy 80 in its standard European market configuration received two stars in the Euro NCAP Quadricycle Ratings in 2014.

== Sales ==
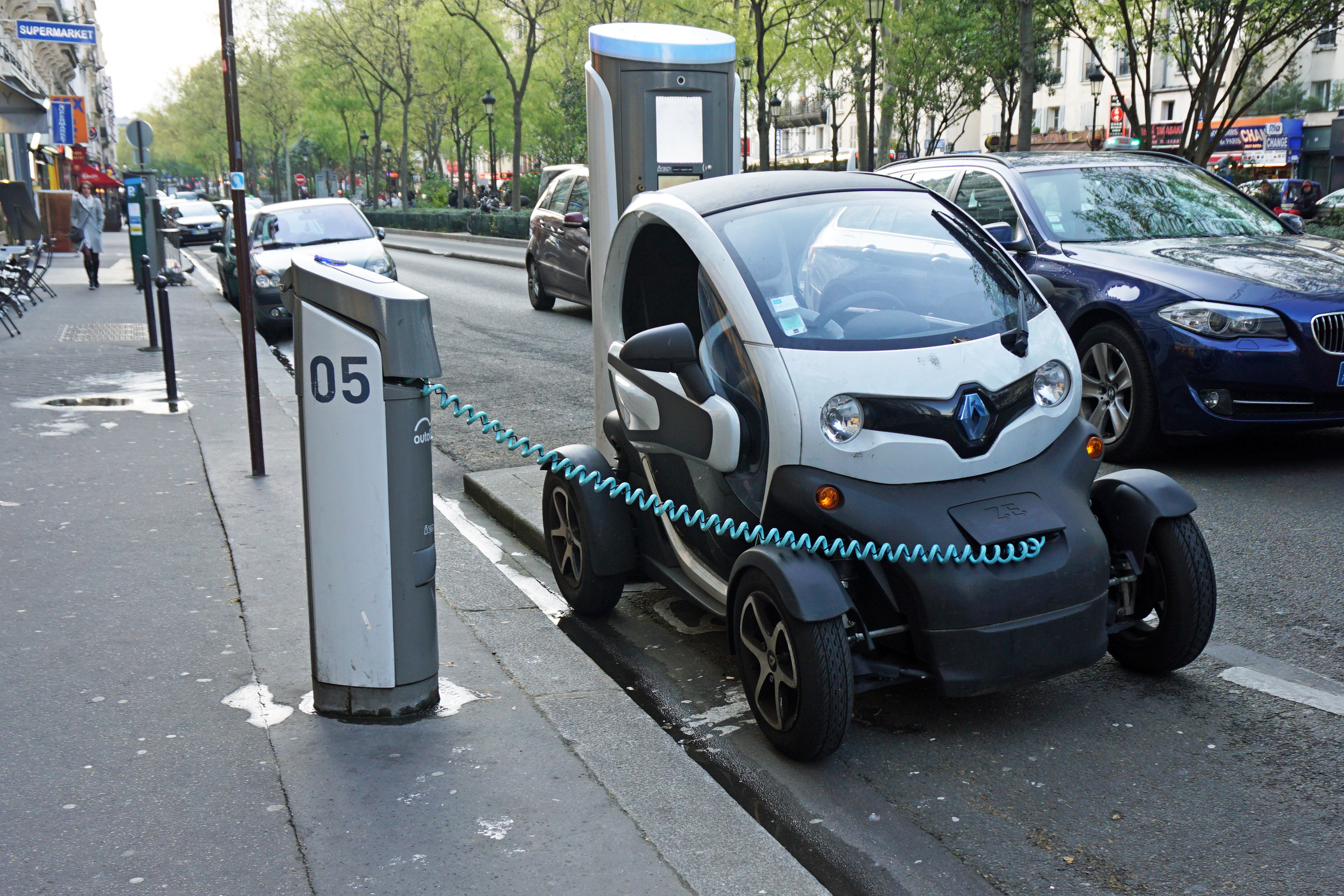
Twizy charging at an Autolib' carsharing station in Paris

Since its market launch in March 2012, global sales reached 9,020 units through the end of 2012, of which, 9,015 units were sold in Europe, making the Twizy the best-selling plug-in electric vehicle in the European market that year. In France, a total of 1,551 units were registered through June 2012, including 1,212 Twizy 80s and 339 Twizy 45s, representing a market share of 89% in the heavy quadricycle segment, and a market share of 28.5% among all categories of electric vehicles sold in France during the first half of 2012, surpassing the Bolloré Bluecar, the top selling highway-capable all-electric car during this time period.

Global sales fell 66.4% in 2013 from 2012, with 3,025 units delivered. Cumulative sales reached 14,160 units through October 2014. As of October 2014, the best-selling markets were Germany with 3,728 units and France with 3,276 units, followed by Italy with 2,265 units, Spain with 1,292, and Benelux with 1,137 units delivered since 2011. The milestone of 15,000 Twizys sold worldwide was achieved in April 2015.

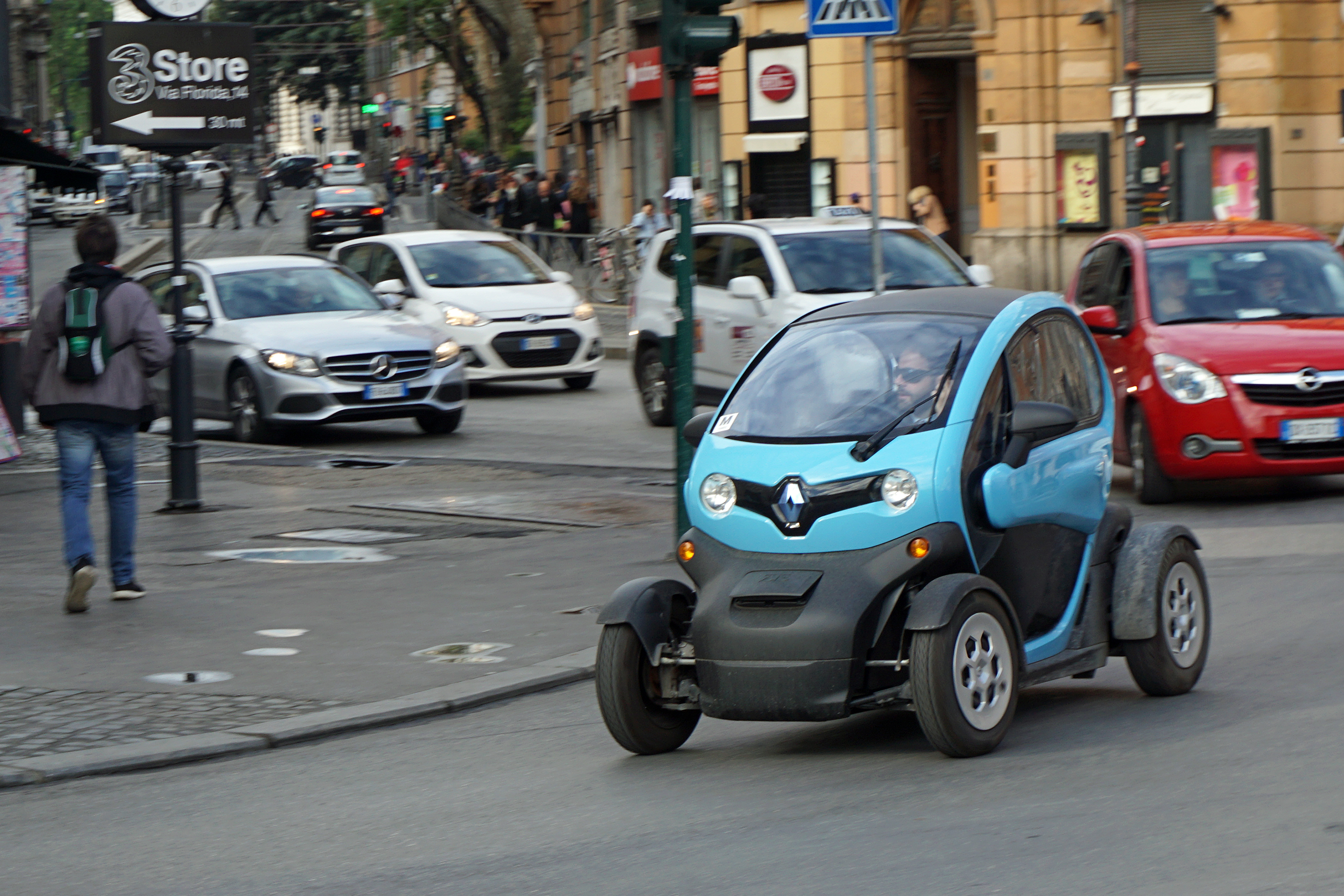
Renault Twizy in Rome's historical center (Centro Storico)

In 2016, Renault introduced the Twizy to Ecuador, along with the Renault Kangoo, expecting to import at least 150 to 200 units between the two models. The carmaker teamed with a shopping centre in Cumbayá (a suburb of Quito) and the Ecuadorean Production Ministry to hold a draw for two examples in an introductory campaign. The winners received their cars on 17 February. All subsequent units are scheduled to arrive in-country from June, 2016, and will retail from US$14,990. Sales in Latin America totaled 305 units through May 2016, with Colombia as the regional market leader with 252 units, followed by Brazil with 34 units. The Renault Twizy 40 was certified by Transport Canada in March 2016, and was scheduled to be released on the Canadian market by mid-2016.

As of May 2016, Twizy sales led by Germany with 4,404 units, followed by France with 4,048, Italy with 2,696, Spain with 1,551, Benelux with 1,355, and Switzerland with 1,141. Until December 2016, a total of 18,592 units had been sold in Europe, representing 96.1% of global sales. Global sales since inception totaled 29,118 units through December 2019.

In 2020, Renault India said they were considering offering a stripped-down version of the Twizy Cargo for the Indian market.

== Carsharing programs ==
Renault tested a carsharing program called Twizy Way in Saint-Quentin-en-Yvelines, France, beginning in late-June 2012. During the testing phase, the program operated with a fleet of 50 Renault Twizys distributed over a pilot area covering around 27 km^{2} (10 sq mi), and around 200 were allowed to sign up for testing. Twizy Way opened the service to the general public in December 2012.

In 2015, the Scoot scooter sharing company offered rides within San Francisco in the "Scoot Quad", a Twizy with Nissan badging.

== Exclusive Italian model ==
An exclusive Italian model in limited edition design by Italian architect Giansandro Schina was made in only 7 units.

== Chinese copy ==
In September 2014, the Chinese company Zhejiang Litong New Energy Automobile Corporation launched the Rayttle E28 which greatly resembles the Twizy in outside appearance, size and claimed performance.

== Culture ==
The Twizy was licensed to be included in the video game The Sims 3, appearing as free content for the game's online store. The Twizy appears in large numbers in the film Ready Player One by Steven Spielberg, released in 2018.

== Gallery ==
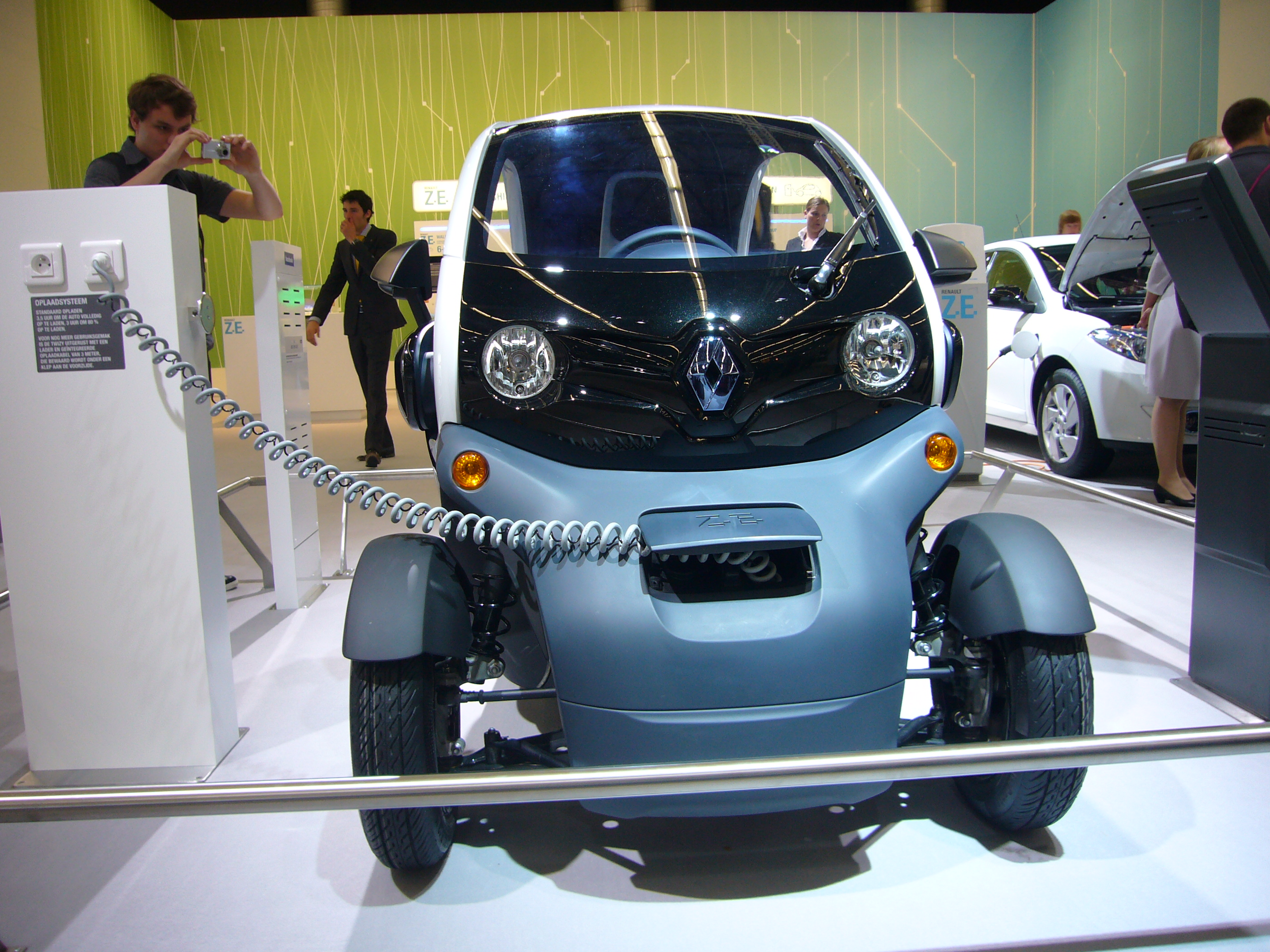
Revised concept of the Twizy for a close-to-production vehicle, 2010, seen at the AutoRAI in Amsterdam

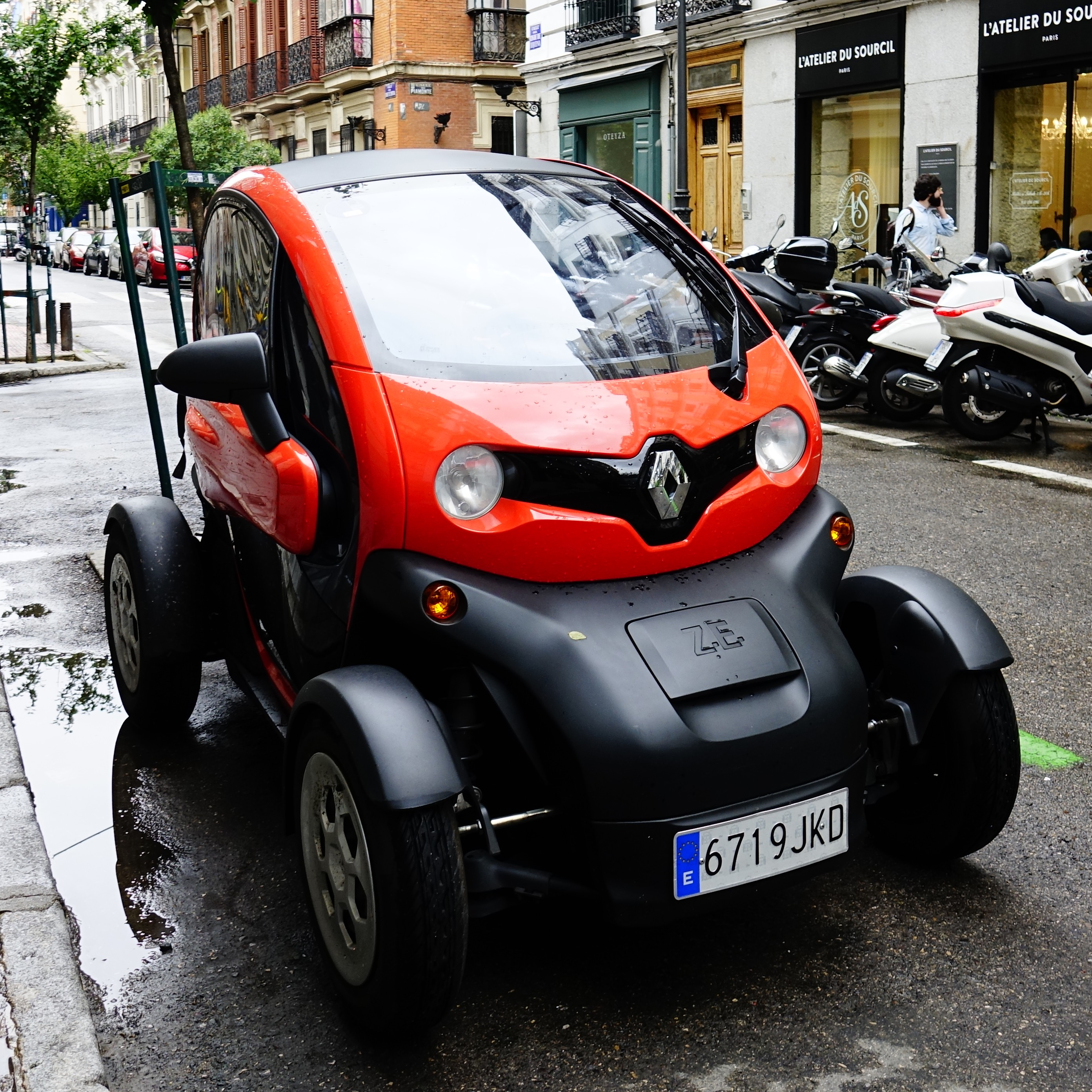
Twizy parked in Madrid city centre

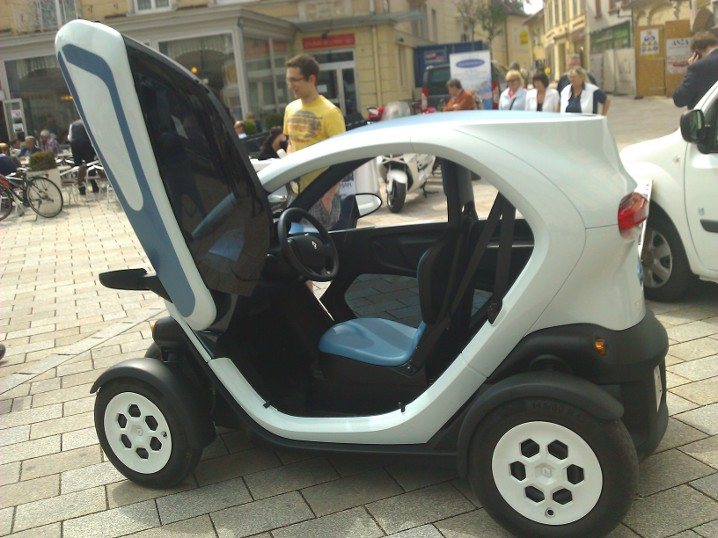
Side view from the back at the motor show in Baden, 2012-05-05

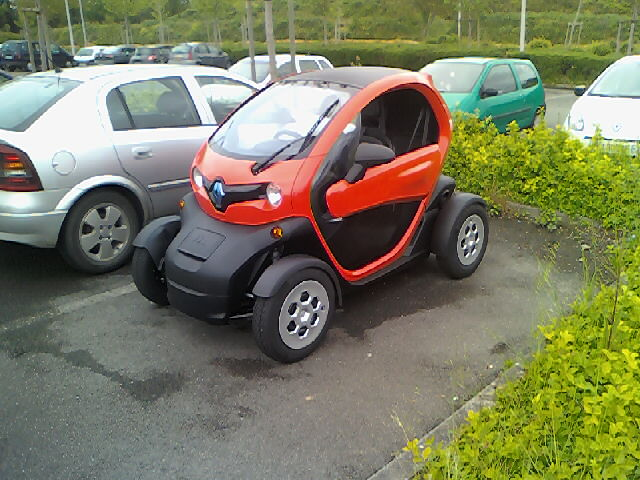
Renault Twizy compared to a regular-sized car

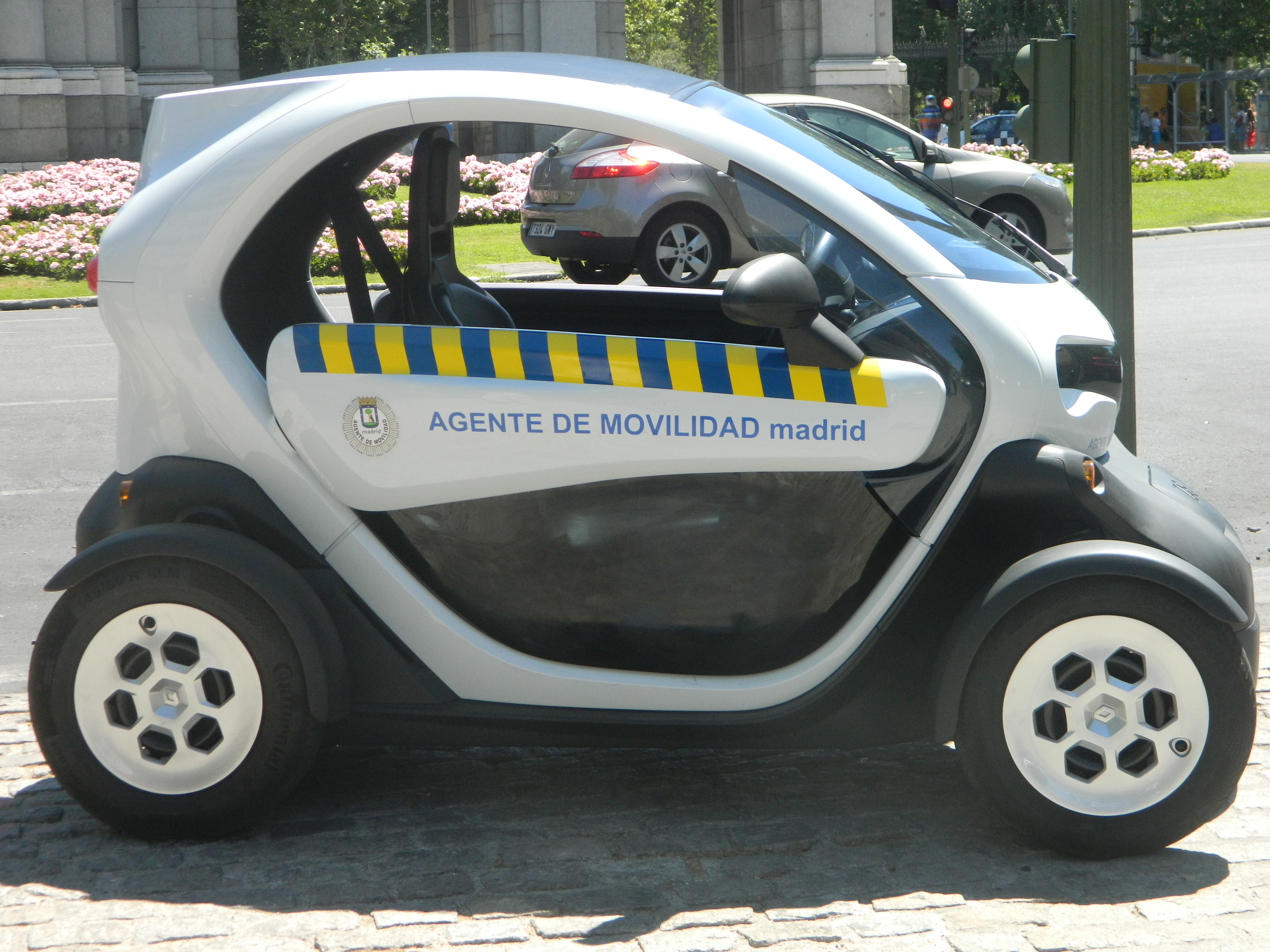
Renault Twizy of the Madrid traffic directors

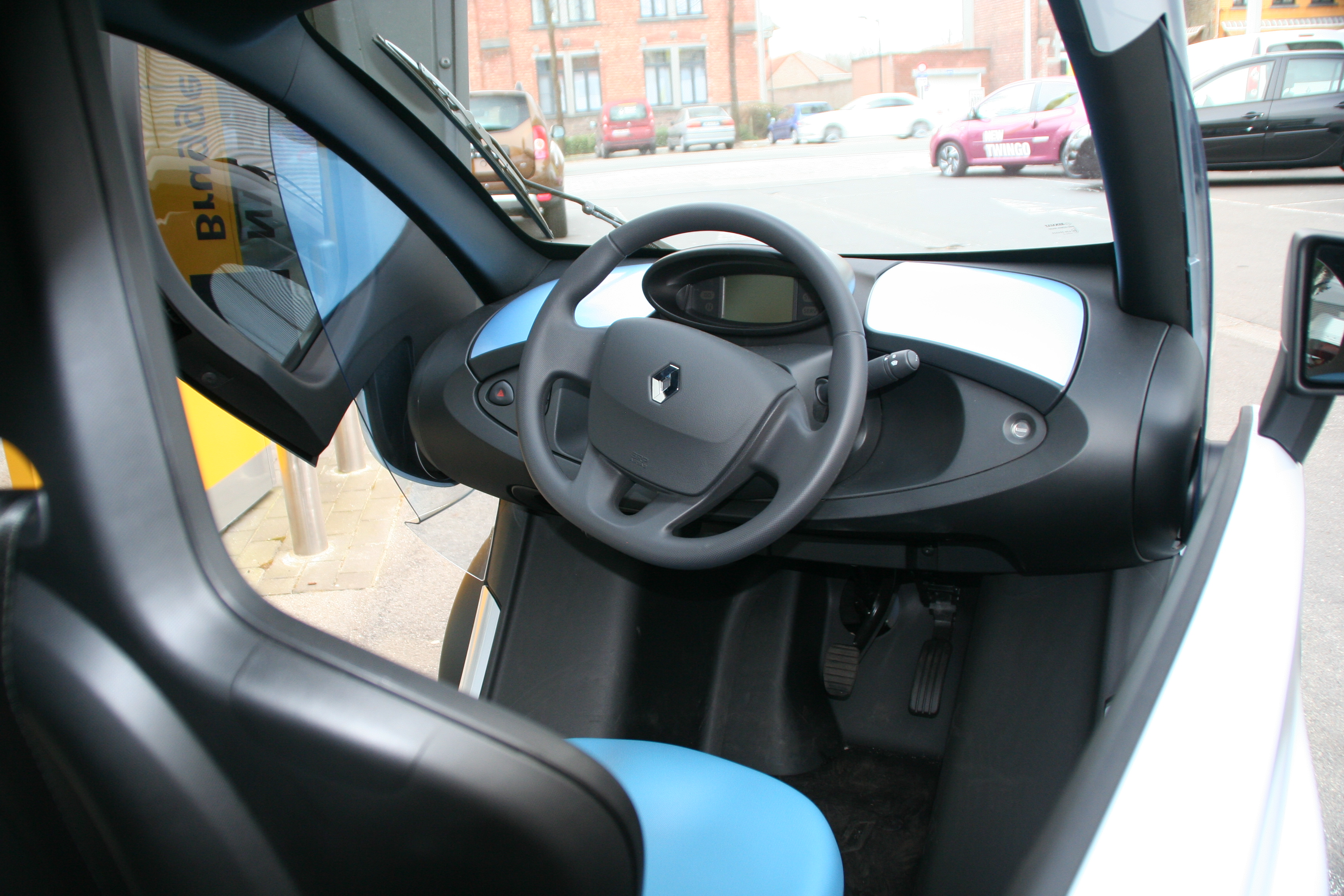
Interior

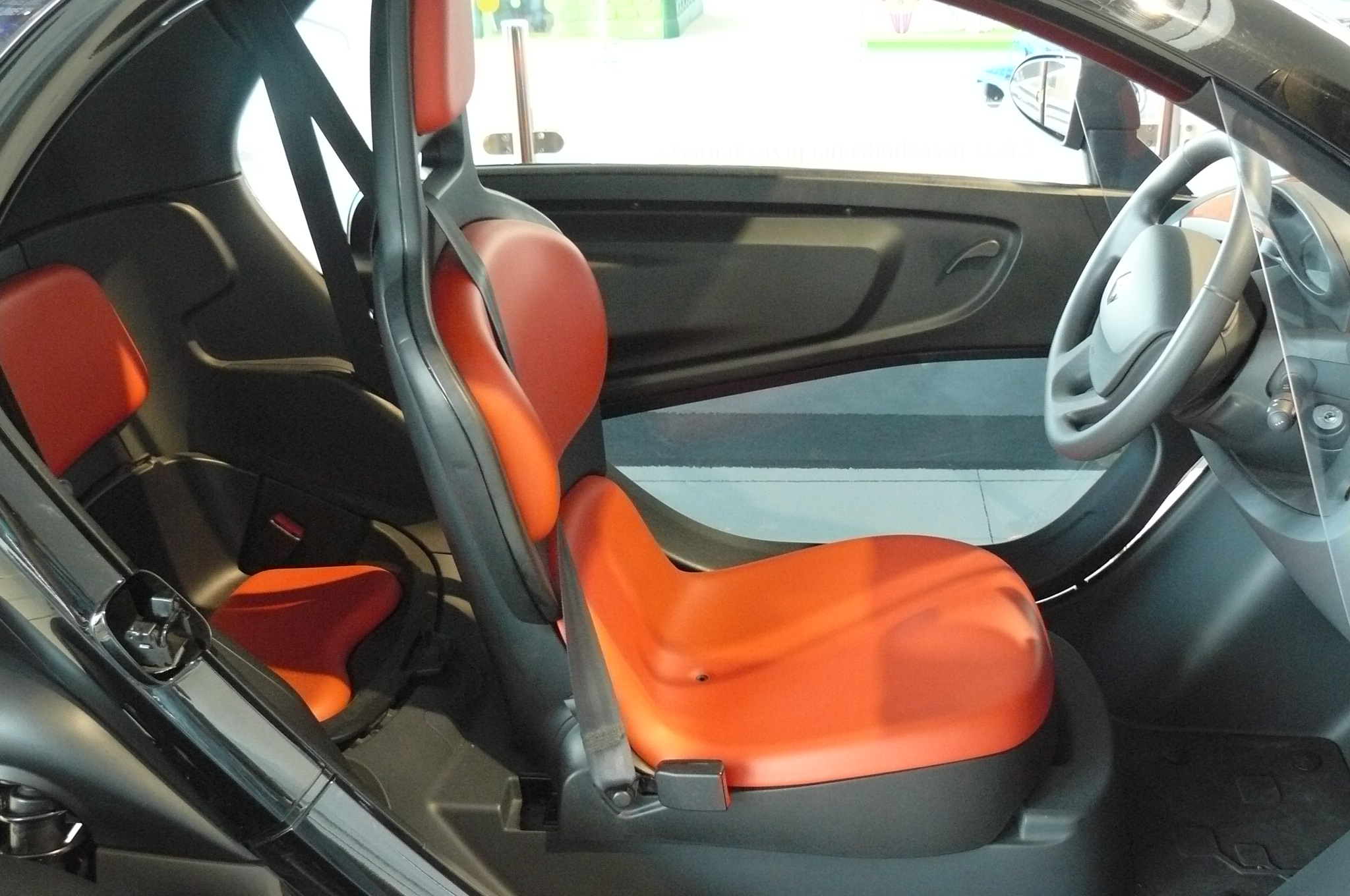
1+1 seating arrangement

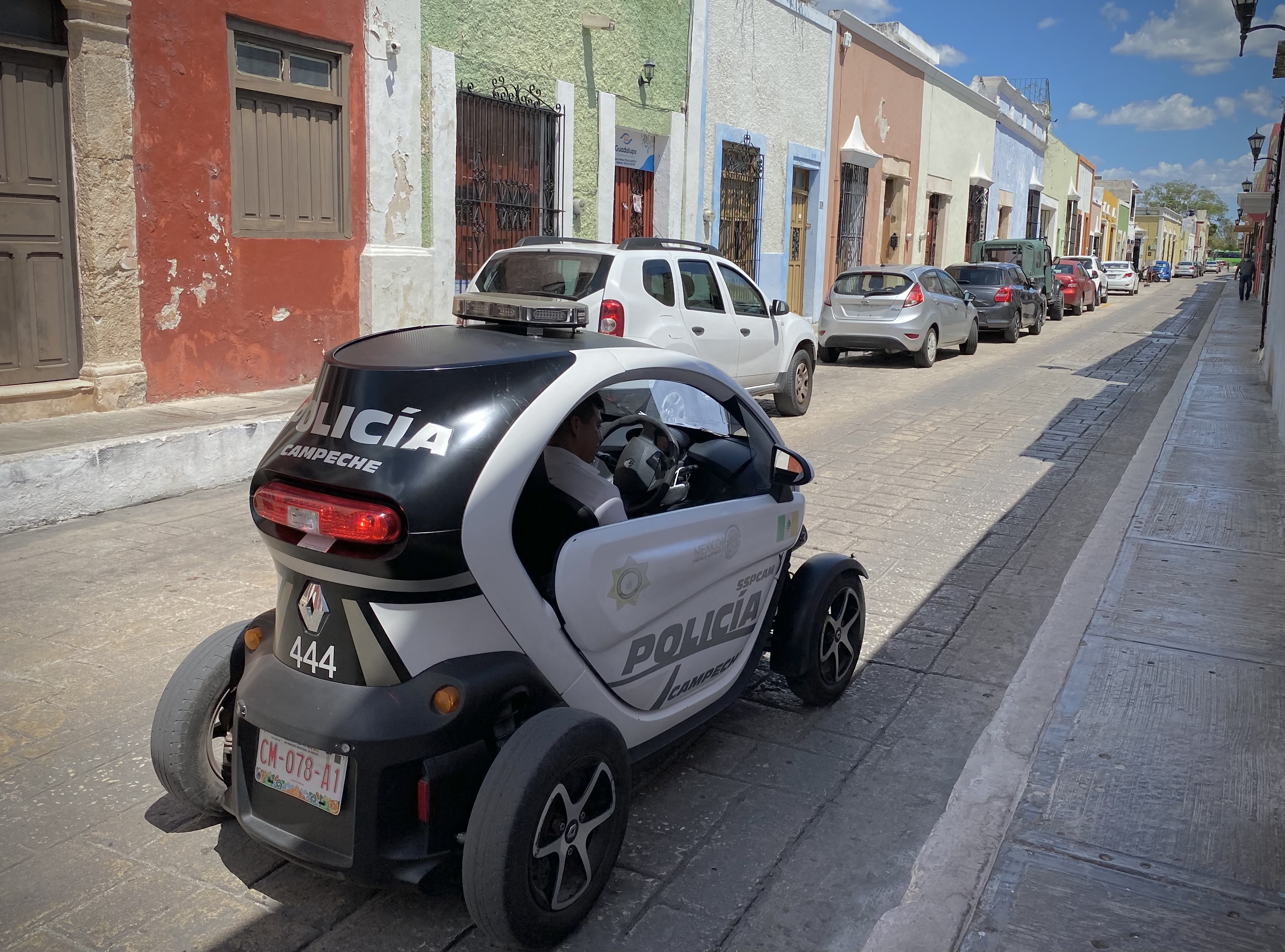
Twizy used by Mexican police in Campeche City

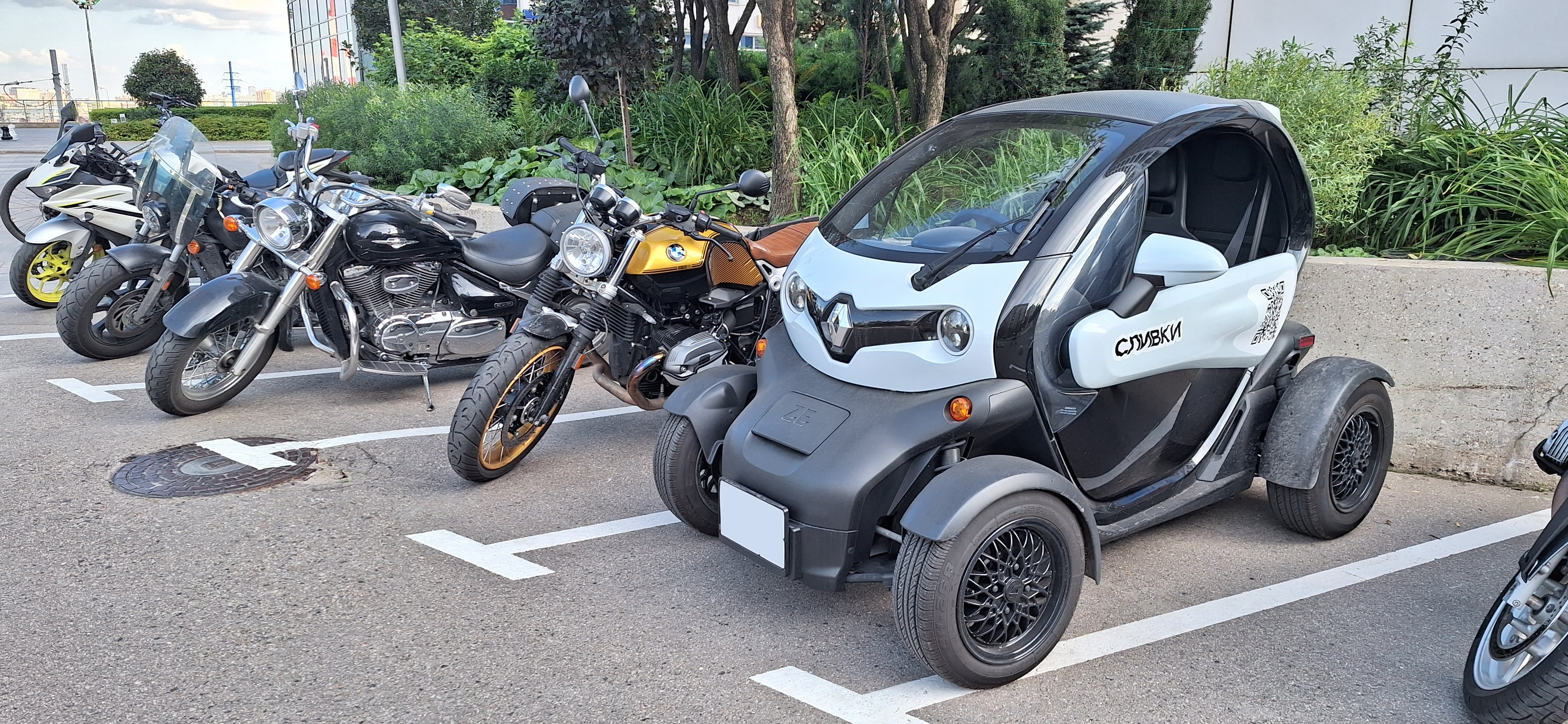
In comparison with motorcycles

== See also ==
- City car
- Electric car use by country
- Microcar
- Neighborhood electric vehicles (NEV)
- Nissan Leaf, another all-electric from Renault-Nissan.
- Renault Fluence Z.E.
- Renault Zoe
