= Quadricycle (EU vehicle classification) =

EU vehicle category for four-wheeled microcars

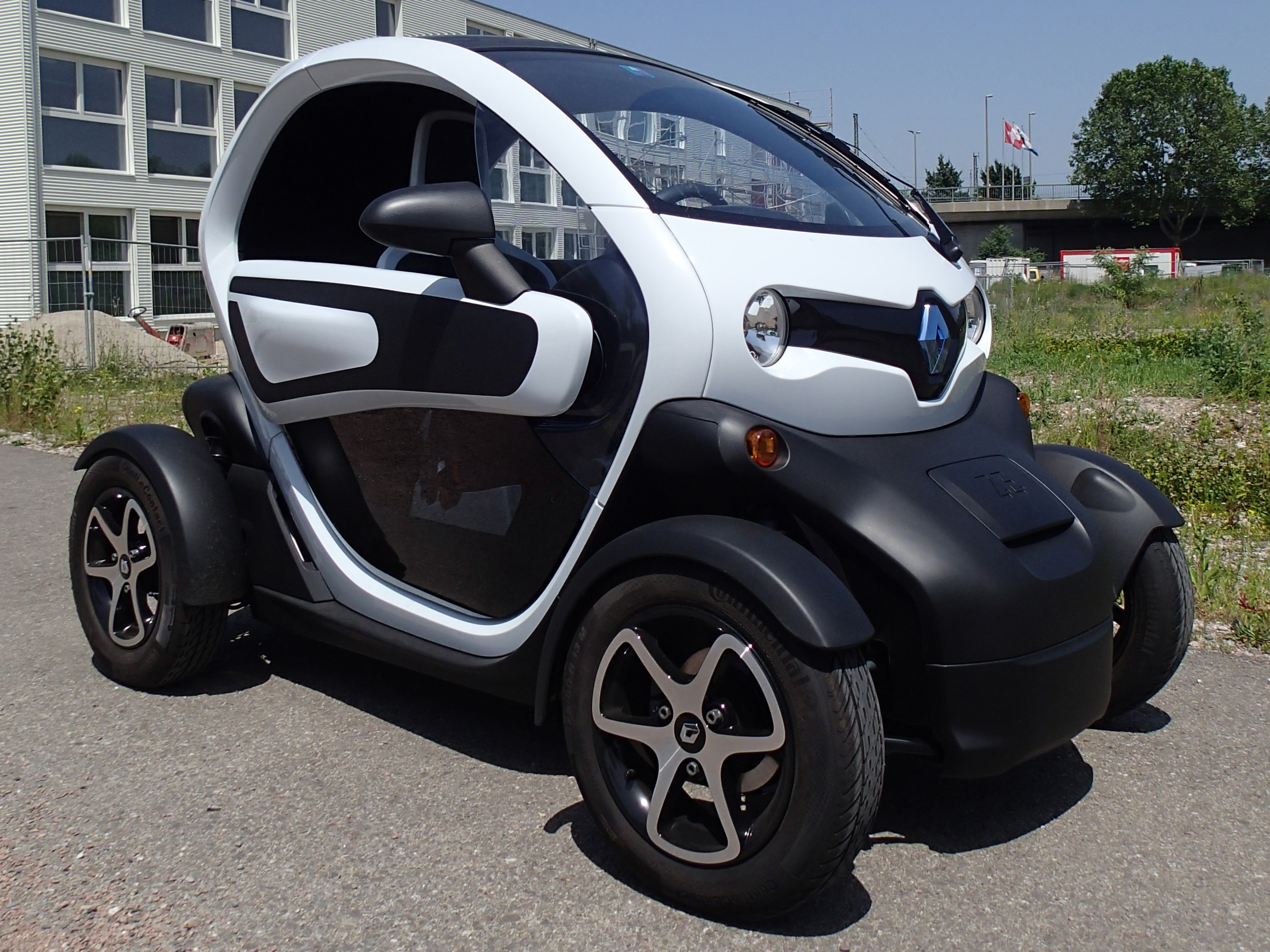
Renault Twizy is available in configurations that meet both Light and Heavy Quadricycle specifications.

The quadricycle is a European Union vehicle category for four-wheeled microcars, which allows these vehicles to be designed to less stringent requirements when compared to regular cars. Quadricycles are defined by limitations in terms of weight, engine power and speed.

There are two categories of quadricycles: light quadricycles (L6e) and heavy quadricycles (L7e).

== History ==
The quadricycle classification was officially created in 1992, when the European Union published Directive 92/61/EEC which decreed that quadricycles fell into the same category as mopeds. In 2002, Framework Directive 2002/24/EC then refined this definition by distinguishing between light and heavy quadricycles (L6e and L7e categories).

The framework for drivers licences of light quadricycles in the EU was released in 2006, with Directive 2006/126 (the third Driving Licence directive). This directive applies the same requirements for light quadricycles as for mopeds. This directive includes a recommendation to specify a minimum driving age of 16 years, although the age limit actually varies between 14 and 18 years between countries.

== Categories ==
=== Light quadricycles (L6e) ===
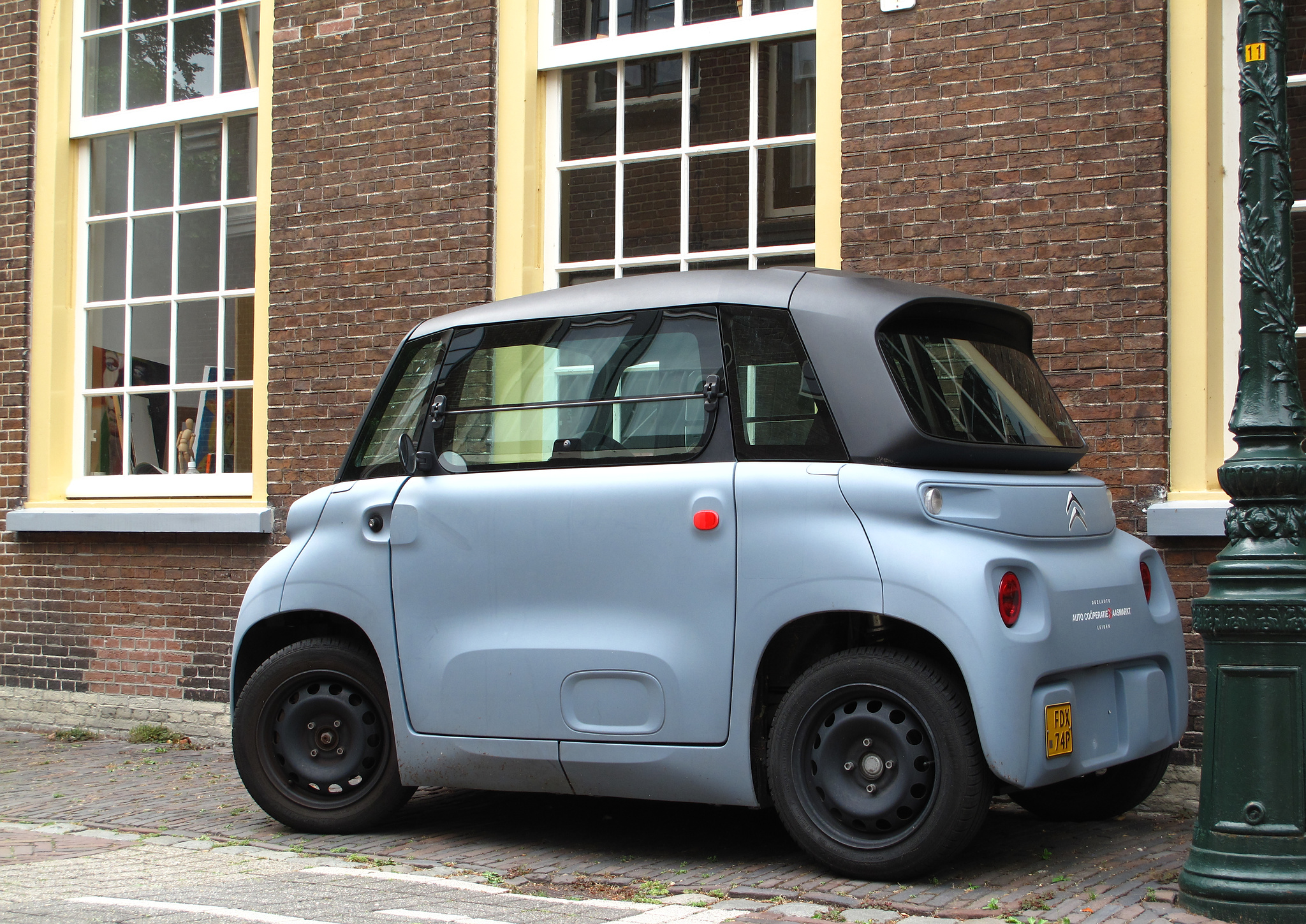
Citroën Ami, a popular light quadricycle, which sold over 30000 units

Light quadricycles (L6e) are defined by Framework Directive 2002/24/EC as: "motor vehicles with four wheels whose unladen mass is not more than 425 kg (937 lb), not including the mass of the batteries in case of electric vehicles, whose maximum design speed is not more than 45 km/h (28 mph), and:

1. whose engine cylinder capacity does not exceed 50 cm^{3} (3.1 in^{3}) for spark (positive) ignition engines, or
2. whose maximum net power output does not exceed 6 kW (8.0 hp) in the case of other (e.g. diesel fuelled) internal combustion engines, or
3. whose maximum continuous rated power does not exceed 4 kW (5.4 hp) in the case of an electric motor.

=== Heavy quadricycles (L7e) ===
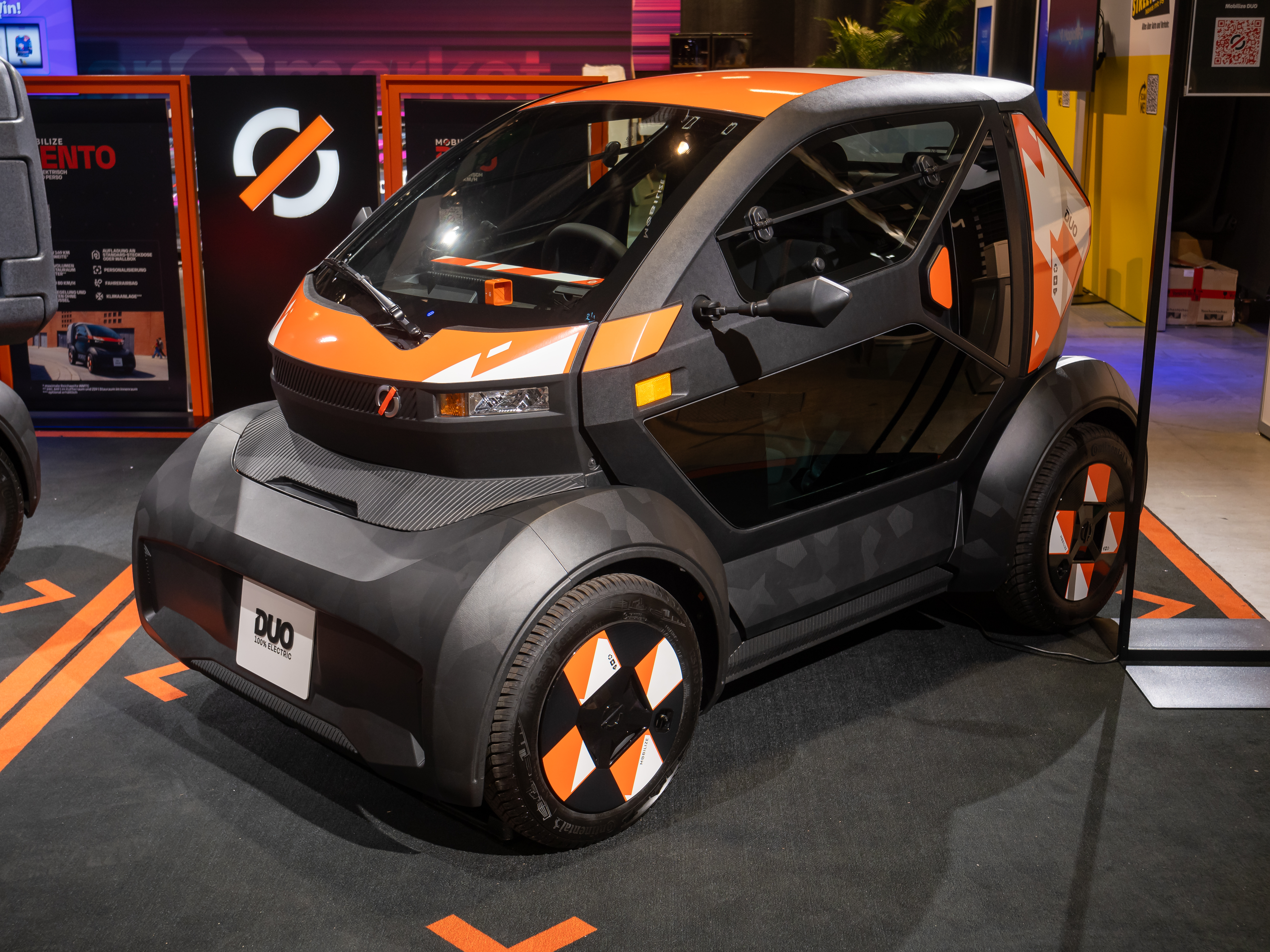
Mobilize Duo, a vehicle available in L7e configuration.

Quadricycles (L7e), also referred to as Heavy quadricycles, are defined by Framework Directive 2002/24/EC as motor vehicles with four wheels other than those referred to as light quadricycles, whose unladen mass is not more than 450 kg (990 lb) for passenger vehicles or 600 kg (1,300 lb) for vehicles intended for carrying goods not including the mass of batteries in the case of electric vehicles, whose maximum net engine power does not exceed 15 kW (20 hp) and a maximum design vehicle speed of 90 km/h (56 mph).

== Country-specific legislation ==
=== Finland ===
The age limit for light quadricycles is 15, while it is 18 years for cars in general. Mopeds have been traditionally popular in Finland among youth, and light quadricycles have been introduced into the same niche. Light quadricycles are locally called "moped cars". There is a licence category called AM-121, introduced in 2013, separately for quadricycles, although M-class (moped) licenses issued before 2013 qualify as well. Higher categories of licences (A1, A and B) automatically qualify for quadricycles, but age limits of A1, A and B are 16, 18 and 18, respectively.

Some have been concerned about the danger that quadricycles' low speed poses to other traffic. Over the past decade, Finland has been considering replacing quadricycles with cars with speed limiters; this topic became controversial in February 2017 after the Sastamala quadricycle accident in Sastamala, Pirkanmaa, Finland.

=== France ===
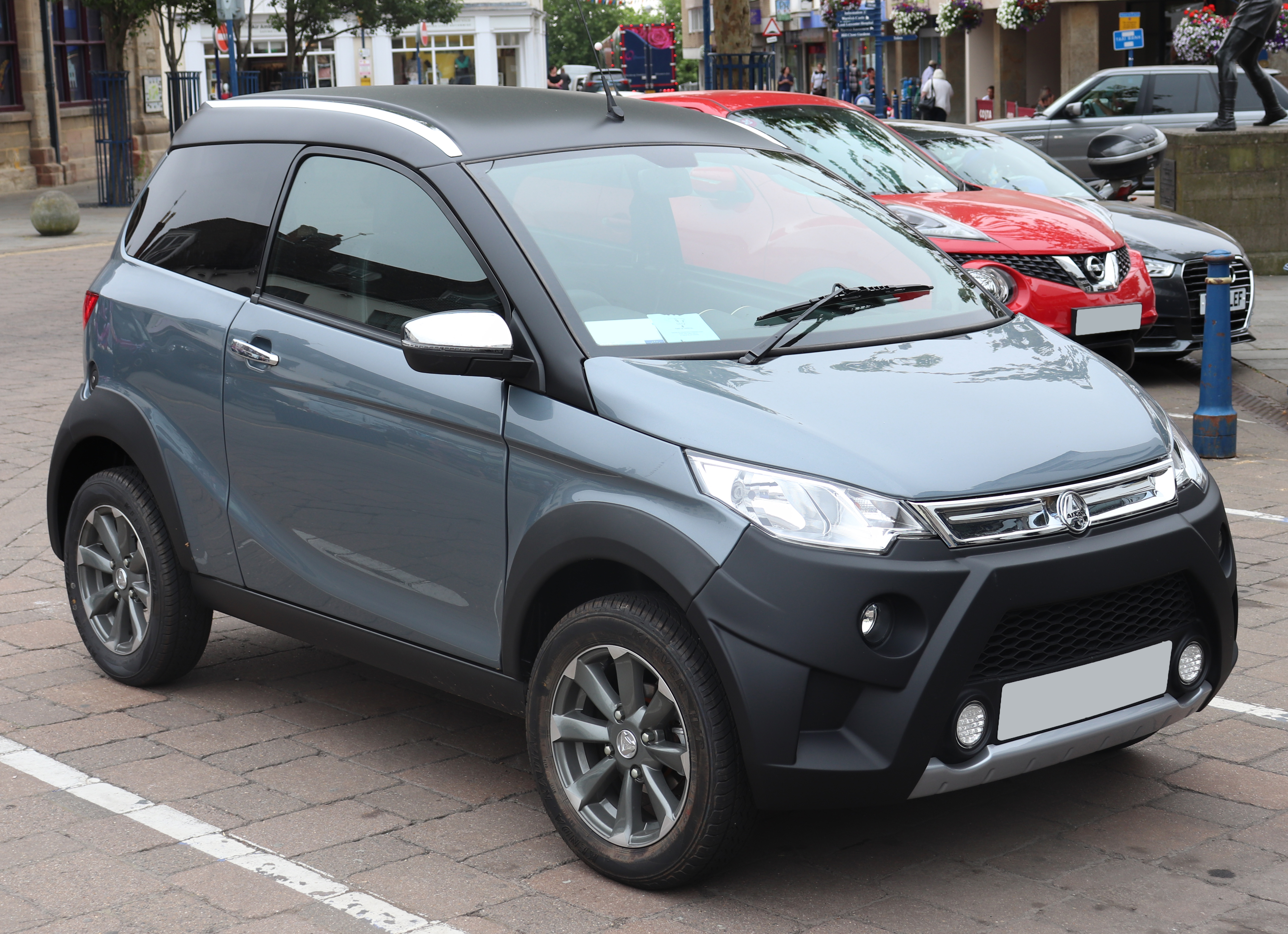
Aixam Crossline, an example of French voiture sans permis

In France, some small cars are commonly referred to as voiture sans permis ('vehicle without licence'), which now corresponds to light quadricycle (L6e). They can still be driven without a driving licence by drivers born before 1988.

Otherwise, they can be driven on a "road safety certificate" category of drivers licence, which is available to people 14 years or older. The quadricycle must be speed limited to 45 km/h (28 mph) and have a petrol motor up to 50 cc (3.1 cu in) or be electric or diesel powered up to 4 kW (5.4 hp).

Quadricycles are prohibited on motorways in France.

=== Italy ===
Light quadricylces can be driven from 14 years of age; Heavy quadricycles can be driven from 16 years of age and they require a driving licence A. Quadricycles are prohibited on motorways in Italy.

=== United Kingdom ===
In the UK before October 2000, a person who passed a motorcycle test was automatically granted a full sub-category B1 licence, allowing them to drive a lightweight car (an unladen weight of 550 kg (1,210 lb) or less), a motor quadricycle or a motor tricycle. Since 2000 these small cars have been split in two different classifications, light and heavy quadricycles.

A Light quadricycle, a micro car with less than 6 kW (8 hp) of power, and an unladen mass no more than 425 kg (940 lb) can be driven on a full bike licence. Anything more powerful or heavier requires a full car licence to be legally driven as a vehicle on UK roads.

== Manufacturers ==
- Acciona
- Aixam
- Austin Motor Company
- Casalini
- Chatenet
- Evetta
- Eli Electric
- Global Electric Motorcars
- Grecav
- Italcar
- Jonway
- Ligier
- Melex
- Micro
- Piaggio
- Renault (Renault Twizy)
- Stellantis (Citroën Ami, Opel Rocks-e, and Fiat Topolino)
- Tazzari
- Wink Motors
- Zhidou

== See also ==
- Car classification
- Vehicle category
- Neighborhood Electric Vehicle – US category of microcar
- Motorized quadcycle – Quadricycle without steering wheel
