= Power-to-weight ratio =

Calculation commonly applied to engines and mobile power sources

Power-to-weight ratio (PWR, also called specific power, or power-to-mass ratio) is a mass-specific quantity commonly applied to engines and mobile power sources to enable the comparison of one unit or design to another. Power-to-weight ratio is a measurement of the actual performance of any engine or power source. It is also used as a measurement of the performance of a vehicle as a whole, with the engine's power output being divided by the weight (or mass) of the vehicle, to give a metric that is independent of the vehicle's size. Manufacturers often quote power-to-weight at its peak value, but the actual value may vary in use, and these variations can affect performance.

The inverse of power-to-weight, the weight-to-power ratio (power loading), is a calculation commonly applied to aircraft, cars, and other vehicles to enable comparison of one vehicle's performance to another. Power-to-weight ratio is equal to thrust per unit mass multiplied by the velocity of any vehicle.

== Power-to-weight (specific power) ==
The power-to-weight ratio (specific power) is defined as the power generated by the engine(s) divided by the mass. In this context, the term "weight" is a misnomer, as it colloquially refers to mass. In a zero-gravity (weightless) environment, the power-to-weight ratio would not be considered infinite.

A typical turbocharged V8 diesel engine might have an engine power of 250 kW (340 hp) and a mass of 380 kg (840 lb), giving it a power-to-weight ratio of 0.65 kW/kg (0.40 hp/lb).

Examples of high power-to-weight ratios can often be found in turbines. This is because of their ability to operate at very high speeds. For example, the Space Shuttle's main engines used turbopumps (machines consisting of a pump driven by a turbine engine) to feed the propellants (liquid oxygen and liquid hydrogen) into the engine's combustion chamber. The original liquid hydrogen turbopump is similar in size to an automobile engine (weighing approximately 352 kilograms (775 lb)) and produces 72,000 hp (54 MW) for a power-to-weight ratio of 153 kW/kg (93 hp/lb).

=== Physical interpretation ===
In classical mechanics, instantaneous power is the limiting value of the average work done per unit time as the time interval Δt approaches zero (i.e., the derivative with respect to time of the work done).

$$P = \lim _{\Delta t\rightarrow 0} \tfrac{\Delta W(t)}{\Delta t} = \lim _{\Delta t\rightarrow 0} P_\mathrm{avg} = \frac{d}{dt}W(t)\,$$

The typically used metric unit of the power-to-weight ratio is $\tfrac{\text{W}}{\text{kg}}$ which equals $\tfrac{\text{m}^2}{\text{s}^3}$. This fact allows one to express the power-to-weight ratio purely by SI base units. A vehicle's power-to-weight ratio equals its acceleration times its velocity; so at twice the velocity, it experiences half the acceleration, all else being equal.

==== Propulsive power ====
If the work to be done is rectilinear motion of a body with constant mass $m$, whose center of mass is to be accelerated along a (possibly non-straight) line to a speed $|\mathbf{v}(t)|$ and angle $\phi$ with respect to the centre and radial of a gravitational field by an onboard powerplant, then the associated kinetic energy is

$$E_K =\tfrac{1}{2} m|\mathbf{v}(t)|^2$$

where:

$m$ is mass of the body
$|\mathbf{v}(t)|$ is speed of the center of mass of the body, changing with time.

The work–energy principle states that the work done to the object over a period of time is equal to the difference in its total energy over that period of time, so the rate at which work is done is equal to the rate of change of the kinetic energy (in the absence of potential energy changes).

The work done from time t to time t + Δt along the path C is defined as the line integral $\int_C \mathbf{F} \cdot d\mathbf{x} = \int_t^{t + \Delta t} \mathbf{F} \cdot \mathbf{v}(t) dt$, so the fundamental theorem of calculus has that power is given by $\mathbf{F}(t) \cdot \mathbf{v}(t) = m\mathbf{a}(t) \cdot \mathbf{v}(t) = \mathbf{\tau}(t) \cdot \mathbf{\omega}(t)$.

where:

$\mathbf{a}(t) = \frac{d}{dt}\mathbf{v}(t)$ is acceleration of the center of mass of the body, changing with time.
$\mathbf{F}(t)$ is linear force – or thrust – applied upon the center of mass of the body, changing with time.
$\mathbf{v}(t)$ is velocity of the center of mass of the body, changing with time.
$\mathbf{\tau}(t)$ is torque applied upon the center of mass of the body, changing with time.
$\mathbf{\omega}(t)$ is angular velocity of the center of mass of the body, changing with time.

In propulsion, power is only delivered if the powerplant is in motion, and is transmitted to cause the body to be in motion. It is typically assumed here that mechanical transmission enables the power plant to operate at peak power output. This assumption allows engine tuning to trade power band width and engine mass for transmission complexity and mass. Electric motors do not suffer from this tradeoff, instead trading their high torque for traction at low speed. The power advantage or power-to-weight ratio is then

$$\mbox{P-to-W} = |\mathbf{a}(t)||\mathbf{v}(t)|$$

where:

$|\mathbf{v}(t)|$ is linear speed of the center of mass of the body.

==== Engine power ====
The useful power of an engine with shaft power output can be calculated using a dynamometer to measure torque and rotational speed, with maximum power reached when torque multiplied by rotational speed is a maximum. For jet engines, the useful power is equal to the flight speed of the aircraft multiplied by the force, known as net thrust, required to make it go at that speed. It is used when calculating propulsive efficiency.

== Examples ==
=== Engines ===
==== Heat engines and heat pumps ====
Thermal energy is made up from molecular kinetic energy and latent phase energy. Heat engines can convert thermal energy in the form of a temperature gradient between a hot source and a cold sink into other desirable mechanical work. Heat pumps take mechanical work to regenerate thermal energy in a temperature gradient. Standard definitions should be used when interpreting the transfer of a jet or rocket engine's propulsive power to its vehicle.

Heat engine/Heat pump type	Peak power output		Power-to-weight ratio		Example use
Heat engine/Heat pump type	SI	English	SI	English	Example use
Wärtsilä RTA96-C 14-cylinder two-stroke diesel engine	80,080 kW	108,920 hp	0.03 kW/kg	0.02 hp/lb	Emma Mærsk container ship
ROTAX 900 ACE 60 900 cc, 3-cylinder, 4-stroke, naturally-aspirated marine engine	45 kW	60 hp	0.24 kW/kg	0.15 hp/lb	Sea-Doo SPARK 2 UP 2021
Suzuki 538 cc V-2 four-stroke petrol outboard motor	19 kW	25 hp	0.27 kW/kg	0.16 hp/lb	Runabout boats
DOE/NASA/0032-28 Mod 2 502 cc petrol Stirling engine	62.3 kW	83.5 hp	0.30 kW/kg	0.18 hp/lb	Chevrolet Celebrity 1985 ('one-off' prototype)
Yamaha TR-1 3-cylinder, 4-stroke, marine engine, 1049 cc	74.5 kW	100 hp	0.44 kW/kg	0.27 hp/lb	Yamaha SuperJet 2021
Kawasaki 1498 cc supercharged, intercooled, 4-stroke, 4-cylinder, DOHC	231 kW	310 hp	0.47 kW/kg	0.29 hp/lb	Kawasaki ULTRA 310LX Jet Ski
GM Duramax LMM V-8 6.6 L turbo-diesel	246 kW	330 hp	0.65 kW/kg	0.40 hp/lb	Chevrolet Kodiak, GMC Topkick
Junkers Jumo 205A two-stroke, diesel, opposed-piston engine	647 kW	867 hp	1.1 kW/kg	0.66 hp/lb	Ju 86C-1 airliner, B&V Ha 139 floatplane
GE LM2500+ marine turboshaft	30,200 kW	40,500 hp	1.31 kW/kg	0.80 hp/lb	GTS Millennium cruise ship, QM2 ocean liner
Mazda 13B-MSP Renesis 1.3 L Wankel engine	184 kW	247 hp	1.5 kW/kg	0.92 hp/lb	Mazda RX-8
PW R-4360 71.5 L 28-cylinder Radial engine (supercharged)	3,210 kW	4,300 hp	1.83 kW/kg	1.11 hp/lb	B-50, B-36, C-97, C-119, H-4
Wright R-3350 54.57 L 18-Cylinder Turbo-compound radial engine	2,535 kW	3,400 hp	2.09 kW/kg	1.27 hp/lb	B-29, DC-7
O.S. Engines 49-PI Type II 4.97 cc Wankel engine	0.934 kW	1.252 hp	2.8 kW/kg	1.7 hp/lb	UAV, Model aircraft, RC Aircraft
Aston Martin-Cosworth RA V-12 6.5 L N/A	746 kW	1,000 hp	3.62 kW/kg	2.20 hp/lb	Aston Martin Valkyrie, sports car
JetCat SPT10-RX-H turboshaft engine	9 kW	12 hp	3.67 kW/kg	2.24 hp/lb	UAV Model aircraft, RC Aircraft
GE LM6000 marine turboshaft engine	44,700 kW	59,900 hp	5.67 kW/kg	3.38 hp/lb	Peaking power plant
BMW V-10 3 L P84/5 2005 petrol engine N/A	708 kW	950 hp	7.96 kW/kg	4.84 hp/lb	Williams FW27 car, Formula One auto racing
BMW I-4 1.49 L M12 1986 turbo engine	1030 kW	1,500 hp	8.93 kW/kg	5.43 hp/lb	Arrows A9 car, Formula One auto racing
Rolls-Royce T406/AE1107C turboshaft engine	4,586 kW	6,150 hp	10.42 kW/kg	6.33 hp/lb	V-22
Top Fuel supercharged V-8 (nitromethane) engine	8203 kW	11,000 hp	36.46 kW/kg	22.2 hp/lb	U.S. Army Top Fuel Dragster
PWR RS-24 (SSME) Block I H_{2} turbopump	53,690 kW	72,000 hp	153 kW/kg	93 hp/lb	Space Shuttle

1. Full vehicle power-to-weight ratio shown below

==== Electric motors and electromotive generators ====
An electric motor uses electrical energy to provide mechanical work, usually through the interaction of a magnetic field and current-carrying conductors. By the interaction of mechanical work on an electrical conductor in a magnetic field, electrical energy can be generated.

Electric motor type	Weight		Peak power output		Power-to-weight ratio		Example use
Electric motor type	SI	English	SI	English	kW/kg	hp/lb	Example use
Kawak 4 kW 28 VDC brushless DC motor	11.8 kg	26 lb	4 kW	5.4 hp	0.29 kW/kg	0.18 hp/lb	Flight-rated motor for aircraft auxiliary systems (fuel pumps, etc.)
Panasonic MSMA202S1G AC servo motor	6.5 kg	14 lb	2 kW	2.7 hp	0.31 kW/kg	0.19 hp/lb	Conveyor belts, robotics
Kawak 7.5 kW 208 VAC 400 Hz 3-phase synchronous motor	11.8 kg	26 lb	7.5 kW	10.1 hp	0.47 kW/kg	0.29 hp/lb	Flight-rated motor for aircraft auxiliary systems (fuel pumps, etc.)
Toshiba 660 MVA water cooled 23 kV AC turbo generator	1,342 t	2,959,000 lb	660 MW	890,000 hp	0.49 kW/kg	0.30 hp/lb	Bayswater, Eraring coal-fired power stations
Canopy Tech. Cypress 32 MW 15 kV AC PM generator	33,557 kg	73,981 lb	32 MW	43,000 hp	0.95 kW/kg	0.58 hp/lb	Electric power stations
Turncircles AF24PM–S axial flux motor	0.29 kg	0.64 lb	0.39 kW	0.52 hp	1.34 kW/kg	0.52 hp/lb	Electric aircraft
Toyota brushless AC NdFeB PM motor	36.3 kg	80 lb	50 kW	67 hp	1.37 kW/kg	0.84 hp/lb	Toyota Prius 2004
Himax HC6332-250 brushless DC motor	0.45 kg	0.99 lb	1.7 kW	2.3 hp	3.78 kW/kg	2.30 hp/lb	Radio-controlled cars
Hi-Pa Drive HPD40 brushless DC wheel hub motor	25 kg	55 lb	120 kW	160 hp	4.8 kW/kg	2.92 hp/lb	Mini QED HEV, Ford F150 HEV
ElectriFly GPMG4805 brushless DC	1.48 kg	3.3 lb	8.4 kW	11.3 hp	5.68 kW/kg	3.45 hp/lb	Radio-controlled aircraft
Rolls-Royce SP260D-A brushless DC	44 kg	97 lb	260 kW	350 hp	5.9 kW/kg	3.6 hp/lb	Electric aircraft
Tesla Model 3	40.1 kg	88 lb	250 kW	340 hp	6.26 kW/kg	3.82 hp/lb	Electric Vehicle
YASA-400 brushless AC	24 kg	53 lb	165 kW	221 hp	6.875 kW/kg	4.18 hp/lb	Electric vehicles, Drive eO
Porsche Taycan	47 kg	104 lb	350 kW	470 hp	7.5 kW/kg	4.55 hp/lb	Electric Vehicle
ElectriFly GPMG5220 brushless DC motor	0.133 kg	0.29 lb	1.035 kW	1.388 hp	7.78 kW/kg	4.73 hp/lb	Radio-controlled aircraft
Remy HVH250-090-POC3 brushless DC motor	33.5 kg	74 lb	297 kW	398 hp	8.87 kW/kg	5.39 hp/lb	Electric vehicles
TP POWER TP100XL brushless DC motor	7 kg	15 lb	75 kW	101 hp	9.0 kW/kg	5.5 hp/lb	Electric vehicles
MAD V118 IPE V2.0	1.420 kg	3.13 lb	15.885 kW	21.302 hp	11.187 kW/kg	6.805 hp/lb	UAV
Emrax 268 brushless AC motor	19.9 kg	44 lb	230 kW	310 hp	11.56 kW/kg	7.03 hp/lb	Electric aircraft
Lucid Motors brushless DC motor	31.4 kg	69 lb	500 kW	670 hp	15.8 kW/kg	9.68 hp/lb	Electric vehicle
H3X HPDM-250, direct drive	13 kg	29 lb	250 kW	340 hp	19.23 kW/kg	11.70 hp/lb	Electric aircraft
eHelix SPM177-165, direct drive	25.7 kg	57 lb	650 kW	870 hp	25.29 kW/kg	15.38 hp/lb	Electric vehicle

1. Full vehicle power-to-weight ratio shown below

==== Fluid engines and fluid pumps ====
Fluids (liquid and gas) can be used to transmit and/or store energy using pressure and other fluid properties. Hydraulic (liquid) and pneumatic (gas) engines convert fluid pressure into other desirable mechanical or electrical work. Fluid pumps convert mechanical or electrical work into movement or pressure changes of a fluid, or storage in a pressure vessel.

Fluid powerplant type	Dry weight		Peak power output		Power-to-weight ratio		Example use
Fluid powerplant type	SI	English	SI	English	SI	English	
PlatypusPower Q2/200 hydroelectric turbine	43 kg	95 lb	2 kW	2.7 hp	0.047 kW/kg	0.029 hp/lb	
PlatypusPower PP20/200 hydroelectric turbine	330 kg	728 lb	20 kW	27 hp	0.060 kW/kg	0.037 hp/lb	
Atlas Copco LZL 35 pneumatic motor	20 kg	44.1 lb	6.5 kW	8.7 hp	0.33 kW/kg	0.20 hp/lb	
Atlas Copco LZB 14 pneumatic motor	0.30 kg	0.66 lb	0.16 kW	0.22 hp	0.53 kW/kg	0.33 hp/lb	
Bosch 0 607 954 307 pneumatic motor	0.32 kg	0.71 lb	0.1 kW	0.13 hp	0.31 kW/kg	0.19 hp/lb	
Atlas Copco LZB 46 pneumatic motor	1.2 kg	2.65 lb	0.84 kW	1.13 hp	0.7 kW/kg	0.43 hp/lb	
Bosch 0 607 957 307 pneumatic motor	1.7 kg	3.7 lb	0.74 kW	0.99 hp	0.44 kW/kg	0.26 hp/lb	
SAI GM7 radial piston hydraulic motor	300 kg	661 lb	250 kW	335 hp	0.83 kW/kg	0.50 hp/lb	
SAI GM3 radial piston hydraulic motor	15 kg	33 lb	15 kW	20 hp	1 kW/kg	0.61 hp/lb	
Denison GOLD CUP P14 axial piston hydraulic motor	110 kg	250 lb	384 kW	509 hp	3.5 kW/kg	2.0 hp/lb	
Denison TB vane pump	7 kg	15 lb	40.2 kW	53.9 hp	5.7 kW/kg	3.6 hp/lb	
Rexroth A2FM 16cc/rev, bent axis hydraulic motor (continuous output)	5.4 kg	11.9 lb	81.8 kW	109.7 hp	15.1 kW/kg	9.21 hp/lb	Concrete mixers, combine harvesters
Hydroleduc M18, bent axis hydraulic motor (continuous output)	5.5 kg	12.1 lb	92 kW	123 hp	16.7 kW/kg	10.2 hp/lb	Vehicle transmissions, forestry equipment

==== Thermoelectric generators and electrothermal actuators ====
A variety of effects can be harnessed to produce thermoelectricity, thermionic emission, pyroelectricity and piezoelectricity. The Electrical resistance and ferromagnetism of materials can be harnessed to convert electrical current into thermoacoustic energy.

=== Electrochemical (galvanic) and electrostatic cell systems ===
==== (Closed cell) batteries ====
All electrochemical cells deliver a changing voltage as their chemistry shifts from "charged" to "discharged". A battery's manufacturer typically specifies a nominal output voltage and a cutoff voltage. The output voltage falls to the cutoff voltage when the battery becomes "discharged". The nominal output voltage is always less than the open-circuit voltage produced when the battery is "charged". A battery's temperature can affect its power output, with lower temperatures reducing it. Total energy delivered over a single charge cycle is affected by both the battery temperature and the power delivered. If the temperature lowers or the power demand increases, the total energy delivered at the point of "discharge" is also reduced.

Battery discharge profiles are often described in terms of a factor of battery capacity. For example, a battery with a nominal capacity quoted in ampere-hours (Ah) at a C/10 rated discharge current (derived in amperes) may safely provide a higher discharge current – and therefore higher power-to-weight ratio – but only with a lower energy capacity. Power-to-weight ratio for batteries is therefore less meaningful without reference to the corresponding energy-to-weight ratio and cell temperature. This relationship is known as Peukert's law.

Battery type	Volts	Temp.	Energy-to-weight ratio	Power-to-weight ratio
Energizer 675 Mercury Free zinc–air battery	1.4 V	21 °C	1,645 kJ/kg to 0.9 V	1.65 W/kg 2.24 mA
GE Durathon NaMx A2 UPS molten-salt battery	54.2 V	-40–65 °C	342 kJ/kg to 37.8 V	15.8 W/kg C/6 (76 A)
Panasonic R03 AAA Zinc–carbon battery	1.5 V	20±2 °C	47 kJ/kg 20 mA to 0.9 V	3.3 W/kg 20 mA
Panasonic R03 AAA Zinc–carbon battery	1.5 V	20±2 °C	88 kJ/kg 150 mA to 0.9 V	24 W/kg 150 mA
Eagle-Picher SAR-10081 60 Ah 22-cell nickel–hydrogen battery	27.7 V	10 °C	192 kJ/kg C/2 to 22 V	23 W/kg C/2
Eagle-Picher SAR-10081 60 Ah 22-cell nickel–hydrogen battery	27.7 V	10 °C	165 kJ/kg C/1 to 22 V	46 W/kg C/1
ClaytonPower 400 Ah lithium-ion battery	12 V		617 kJ/kg	85.7 W/kg C/1 (175 A)
Energizer 522 Prismatic Zn–MnO_{2} alkaline battery	9 V	21 °C	444 kJ/kg 25 mA to 4.8 V	4.9 W/kg 25 mA
Energizer 522 Prismatic Zn–MnO_{2} alkaline battery	9 V	21 °C	340 kJ/kg 100 mA to 4.8 V	19.7 W/kg 100 mA
Energizer 522 Prismatic Zn–MnO_{2} alkaline battery	9 V	21 °C	221 kJ/kg 500 mA to 4.8 V	99 W/kg 500 mA
Panasonic HHR900D 9.25 Ah nickel–metal hydride battery	1.2 V	20 °C	209.65 kJ/kg to 0.7 V	11.7 W/kg C/5
Panasonic HHR900D 9.25 Ah nickel–metal hydride battery	1.2 V	20 °C	209.65 kJ/kg to 0.7 V	58.2 W/kg C/1
Panasonic HHR900D 9.25 Ah nickel–metal hydride battery	1.2 V	20 °C	209.65 kJ/kg to 0.7 V	116 W/kg 2C
URI 1418 Ah replaceable anode aluminium–air battery model	244.8 V	60 °C	4680 kJ/kg	130.3 W/kg (142 A)
LG Chemical/CPI E2 6 Ah LiMn_{2}O_{4} Lithium-ion polymer battery	3.8 V	25 °C	530.1 kJ/kg C/2 to 3.0 V	71.25 W/kg
LG Chemical/CPI E2 6 Ah LiMn_{2}O_{4} Lithium-ion polymer battery	3.8 V	25 °C	513 kJ/kg 1C to 3.0 V	142.5 W/kg
Saft 45E Fe Super-Phosphate Lithium iron phosphate battery	3.3 V	25 °C	581 kJ/kg C to 2.5 V	161 W/kg
Saft 45E Fe Super-Phosphate Lithium iron phosphate battery	3.3 V	25 °C	560 kJ/kg 1.14 C to 2.0 V	183 W/kg
Saft 45E Fe Super-Phosphate Lithium iron phosphate battery	3.3 V	25 °C	0.73 kJ/kg 2.27 C to 1.5 V	367 W/kg
Energizer CH35 C 1.8 Ah nickel–cadmium battery	1.2 V	21 °C	152 kJ/kg C/10 to 1 V	4 W/kg C/10
Energizer CH35 C 1.8 Ah nickel–cadmium battery	1.2 V	21 °C	147.1 kJ/kg 5C to 1 V	200 W/kg 5 C
Firefly Energy Oasis FF12D1-G31 6-cell 105Ah VRLA battery	12 V	25 °C	142 kJ/kg C/10 to 7.2 V	4 W/kg C/10
Firefly Energy Oasis FF12D1-G31 6-cell 105Ah VRLA battery	12 V	-1 8 °C	7 kJ/kg CCA to 7.2 V	234 W/kg CCA (625 A)
Firefly Energy Oasis FF12D1-G31 6-cell 105Ah VRLA battery	12 V	0 °C	9 kJ/kg CA to 7.2 V	300 W/kg CA (800 A)
Panasonic CGA103450A 1.95 Ah LiCoO_{2} Lithium-ion battery	3.7 V	20 °C	666 kJ/kg C/5.3 to 2.75 V	35 W/kg C/5.3
Panasonic CGA103450A 1.95 Ah LiCoO_{2} Lithium-ion battery	3.7 V	0 °C	633 kJ/kg C/1 to 2.75 V	176 W/kg C/1
Panasonic CGA103450A 1.95 Ah LiCoO_{2} Lithium-ion battery	3.7 V	20 °C	655 kJ/kg C/1 to 2.75 V	182 W/kg C/1
Panasonic CGA103450A 1.95 Ah LiCoO_{2} Lithium-ion battery	3.7 V	20 °C	641 kJ/kg 2C to 2.75 V	356 W/kg 2C
Electric Fuel Battery Corp. UUV 120 Ah zinc–air fuel cell			630 kJ/kg	500 W/kg C/1
Sion Power 2.5 Ah lithium–sulfur battery	2.15 V	25 °C	1260 kJ/kg	70 W/kg C/5
Sion Power 2.5 Ah lithium–sulfur battery	2.15 V	25 °C	1209 kJ/kg	672 W/kg 2C
Stanford Prussian Blue durable Potassium-ion battery	1.35 V	room	54 kJ/kg	13.8 W/kg C/1
Stanford Prussian Blue durable Potassium-ion battery	1.35 V	room	50 kJ/kg	138 W/kg 10C
Stanford Prussian Blue durable Potassium-ion battery	1.35 V	room	39 kJ/kg	693 W/kg 50C
Maxell / Yuasa / AIST nickel–metal hydride lab prototype		45 °C		980 W/kg
Toshiba SCiB cell 4.2 Ah Li_{2}TiO_{3} lithium-ion battery	2.4 V	25 °C	242 kJ/kg	67.2 W/kg C/1
Ionix Power Systems LiMn_{2}O_{4} lithium-ion battery lab model		lab	270 kJ/kg	1700 W/kg
Ionix Power Systems LiMn_{2}O_{4} lithium-ion battery lab model		lab	29 kJ/kg	4900 W/kg
A123 Systems 26650 Cell 2.3 Ah LiFePO_{4} lithium-ion battery	3.3 V	-20 °C	347 kJ/kg C/1 to 2 V	108 W/kg C/1
A123 Systems 26650 Cell 2.3 Ah LiFePO_{4} lithium-ion battery	3.3 V	0 °C	371 kJ/kg C/1 to 2 V	108 W/kg C/1
A123 Systems 26650 Cell 2.3 Ah LiFePO_{4} lithium-ion battery	3.3 V	25 °C	390 kJ/kg C/1 to 2 V	108 W/kg C/1
A123 Systems 26650 Cell 2.3 Ah LiFePO_{4} lithium-ion battery	3.3 V	25 °C	390 kJ/kg 27C to 2 V	3300 W/kg 27C
A123 Systems 26650 Cell 2.3 Ah LiFePO_{4} lithium-ion battery	3.3 V	25 °C	57 kJ/kg 32C to 2 V	5657 W/kg 32C
Saft VL 6 Ah lithium-ion battery	3.65 V	-20 °C	154 kJ/kg 30C to 2.5 V	41.4 W/kg 30C (180 A)
Saft VL 6 Ah lithium-ion battery	3.65 V	-20 °C	182 kJ/kg 1C to 2.5 V	67.4 W/kg 1C
Saft VL 6 Ah lithium-ion battery	3.65 V	25 °C	232 kJ/kg 1C to 2.5 V	64.4 W/kg 1C
Saft VL 6 Ah lithium-ion battery	3.65 V	25 °C	233 kJ/kg 58.3C to 2.5 V	3289 W/kg 58.3C (350 A)
Saft VL 6 Ah lithium-ion battery	3.65 V	25 °C	34 kJ/kg 267C to 2.5 V	7388 W/kg 267C (1.6 kA)
Saft VL 6 Ah lithium-ion battery	3.65 V	25 °C	4.29 kJ/kg 333C to 2.5 V	9706 W/kg 333C (2 kA)

==== Electrostatic, electrolytic, and electrochemical capacitors ====
Capacitors store electric charge on two electrodes separated by an electric field in a semi-insulating (dielectric) medium. Electrostatic capacitors feature planar electrodes onto which electric charge accumulates. Electrolytic capacitors use a liquid electrolyte as one of the electrodes, and the electric double-layer effect at the dielectric-electrolyte boundary to increase the amount of charge stored per unit volume. Electric double-layer capacitors extend both electrodes with a nanoporous material such as activated carbon to significantly increase the surface area upon which electric charge can accumulate, reducing the dielectric medium to nanopores and a very thin high permittivity separator.

While capacitors tend not to be as temperature-sensitive as batteries, they are significantly capacity-constrained and, lacking the strength of chemical bonds, suffer from self-discharge. The power-to-weight ratio of capacitors is usually higher than that of batteries because the charge carriers in capacitors are smaller (electrons rather than ions); however, the energy-to-weight ratio is usually lower.

Capacitor type	Capacitance	Voltage	Temp.	Energy-to-weight ratio	Power-to-weight ratio
ACT Premlis lithium-ion capacitor	2000 F	4.0 V	25 °C	54 kJ/kg to 2.0 V	44.4 W/kg @ 5 A
ACT Premlis lithium-ion capacitor	2000 F	4.0 V	25 °C	31 kJ/kg to 2.0 V	850 W/kg @ 10 A
Nesccap Electric double-layer capacitor	5000 F	2.7 V	25 °C	19.58 kJ/kg to 1.35 V	5.44 W/kg C/1 (1.875 A)
Nesccap Electric double-layer capacitor	5000 F	2.7 V	25 °C	5.2 kJ/kg to 1.35 V	5,200 W/kg @ 2,547 A
EEStor EESU barium titanate supercapacitor	30.693 F	3500 V	85 °C	1471.98 kJ/kg	80.35 W/kg C/5
EEStor EESU barium titanate supercapacitor	30.693 F	3500 V	85 °C	1471.98 kJ/kg	8,035 W/kg 20 C
General Atomics 3330CMX2205 High Voltage Capacitor	20.5 mF	3300 V	(unknown)	2.3 kJ/kg	(unknown)

==== Fuel cell stacks and flow cell batteries ====
Fuel cells and flow cells, although perhaps using similar chemistry to batteries, do not contain the energy storage medium or fuel. With a continuous flow of fuel and oxidant, available fuel cells and flow cells continue to convert the energy storage medium into electric energy and waste products. Fuel cells contain a fixed electrolyte, whereas flow cells require a continuous flow of electrolyte. Flow cells typically have the fuel dissolved in the electrolyte.

Fuel cell type	Dry weight	Power-to-weight ratio	Example use
Redflow Power+BOS ZB600 10kWh ZBB	900 kg	5.6 W/kg (9.3 W/kg peak)	Rural Grid support
Ceramic Fuel Cells BlueGen MG 2.0 CHP SOFC	200 kg	10 W/kg	
Ceramic Fuel Cells BlueGen MG 2.0 CHP SOFC	200 kg	15 W/kg CHP	
MTU Friedrichshafen 240 kW MCFC HotModule 2006	20,000 kg	12 W/kg	
Smart Fuel Cell Jenny 600S 25 W DMFC	1.7 kg	14.7 W/kg	Portable military electronics
UTC Power PureCell 400 kW PAFC	27,216 kg	14.7 W/kg	
GEFC 50V50A-VRB Vanadium redox battery	80 kg	31.3 W/kg (125 W/kg peak)	
Ballard Power Systems Xcellsis HY-205 205 kW PEMFC	2,170 kg	94.5 W/kg	Mercedes-Benz Citaro O530BZ
UTC Power/NASA 12 kW AFC	122 kg	98 W/kg	Space Shuttle orbiter
Ballard Power Systems FCgen-1030 1.2 kW CHP PEMFC	12 kg	100 W/kg	Residential cogeneration
Ballard Power Systems FCvelocity-HD6 150 kW PEMFC	400 kg	375 W/kg	Bus and heavy-duty
NASA Glenn Research Center 50 W SOFC	0.071 kg	700 W/kg	
Honda 2003 43 kW FC Stack PEMFC	43 kg	1000 W/kg	Honda FCX Clarity
Lynntech PEMFC lab prototype	0.347 kg	1,500 W/kg	
PowerCell S3 125 kW commercial PEMFC	43 kg	2,900 W/kg	

1. Full vehicle power-to-weight ratio shown below

=== Photovoltaics ===
Photovoltaic Panel type	Power-to-weight ratio
Thyssen-Solartec 128 W nanocrystalline Si triple-junction PV module	6 W/kg
Suntech/UNSW HiPerforma PLUTO220-Udm 220 W Ga-F22 polycrystalline Si PERC PV module	13.1 W/kg STP
Suntech/UNSW HiPerforma PLUTO220-Udm 220 W Ga-F22 polycrystalline Si PERC PV module	9.64 W/kg nominal
Global Solar PN16015A 62 W CIGS polycrystalline thin-film PV module	40 W/kg
Able (AEC) PUMA 6 kW GaInP2/GaAs/Ge-on-Ge Triplejunction PV array	65 W/kg
Current spacecraft grade	~77 W/kg

=== Vehicles ===
Power-to-weight ratios for vehicles are usually calculated using curb weight (for cars) or wet weight (for motorcycles), i.e., excluding the driver and any cargo. This could be slightly misleading, especially for motorcycles, where the driver might weigh 1/3 to 1/2 of the vehicle's weight. In the sport of competitive cycling, an athlete's performance is increasingly being expressed in VAMs and thus as a power-to-weight ratio in W/kg. This can be measured using a bicycle power meter or calculated from the road's incline and the rider's time to ascend it.

==== Locomotives ====
A locomotive generally must be heavy to develop enough adhesion on the rails to start a train. As the coefficient of friction between steel wheels and rails seldom exceeds 0.25, improving a locomotive's power-to-weight ratio is often counterproductive. However, the choice of power transmission system, such as a variable-frequency drive versus a direct-current drive, may enable a higher power-to-weight ratio by better managing propulsion power.

Vehicle	Year	Power	Vehicle weight	Power-to-weight ratio
Stephenson's Rocket 0-2-2 steam locomotive with tender	1829	15 kW (20 bhp)	4,320 kg (9,520 lb)	3.5 W/kg / 0.002 hp/lb
Chicago, Burlington & Quincy Zephyr streamliner diesel locomotive with railcars	1934	492 kW (660 bhp)	94 t / 208,000 lb	5.21 W/kg / 0.003 hp/lb
Pennsylvania Railroad Q2 class 4-4-6-4 steam locomotive with tender	1944	5,956 kW (7,987 bhp)	475.9 t / 1,049,100 lb	12.5 W/kg / 0.0076 hp/lb
British Rail Class 43 high-speed diesel electric locomotive	1975	1,678 kW (2,250 bhp)	70.25 t / 154,875 lb	23.9 W/kg / 0.014 hp/lb
GE AC6000CW diesel electric locomotive	1996	4,660 kW (6,250 bhp)	192 t / 423,000 lb	24.3 W/kg / 0.015 hp/lb
British Rail Class 55 Napier Deltic diesel electric locomotive	1961	2,460 kW (3,300 bhp)	101 t / 222,667 lb	24.4 W/kg / 0.015 hp/lb
Bombardier JetTrain high-speed gas turbine-electric locomotive	2000	3,750 kW (5,030 bhp)	90,750 kg (200,070 lb)	41.2 W/kg / 0.025 hp/lb

==== Utility and practical vehicles ====
Most vehicles are designed to meet passenger comfort and cargo-carrying requirements. Vehicle designs trade off power-to-weight ratio to increase comfort, cargo space, fuel economy, emissions control, energy security, and endurance. Reduced drag and lower rolling resistance in a vehicle design can enable increased cargo space without increasing the (zero-cargo) power-to-weight ratio. This increases the vehicle's role flexibility. Energy security considerations can trade off power (typically decreased) and weight (typically increased), and therefore power-to-weight ratio, for fuel flexibility or drive-train hybridisation. Some utility and practical vehicle variants, such as hot hatches and sports-utility vehicles reconfigure power (typically increased) and weight to provide the perception of sports car like performance or for other psychological benefit.

===== Notable low ratio =====
Vehicle	Year	Power	Vehicle weight	Power-to-weight ratio
Alberto Contador's Verbier climb 2009 Tour de France on Specialized bike	2009	420 W (0.56 bhp)	62 kg (137 lb)	6.7 W/kg / 0.004 hp/lb
Force Motors Minidor Diesel 499 cc auto rickshaw	2008	6.6 kW (8.9 bhp)	700 kg (1,500 lb)	9 W/kg / 0.0054 hp/lb
Mercedes-Benz Citaro O530BZ H_{2} fuel cell bus	2002	205 kW (275 bhp)	14,500 kg (32,000 lb)	14.1 W/kg / 0.0085 hp/lb
Mazda-Go	1931	10.1 kW (13.5 bhp)	580 kg (1,280 lb)	17.6 W/kg / 0.01 hp/lb
U.S. presidential state car	-	224 kW (300 bhp)	9,000 kg (20,000 lb)	24.7 W/kg / 0.015 hp/lb
International CXT	2004	164 kW (220 bhp)	6,577 kg (14,500 lb)	25 W/kg / 0.015 hp/lb
Amphicar	1965	28.5 kW (38.2 bhp)	1,050 kg (2,310 lb)	27 W/kg / 0.016 hp/lb
Th!nk City	2008	30 kW (40 bhp)	1,038 kg (2,288 lb)	28.9 W/kg / 0.017 hp/lb
Mazda R360	1960	12 kW (16 bhp)	380 kg (840 lb)	31 W/kg / 0.019 hp/lb
Mitsubishi i MiEV	2009	47 kW (63 bhp)	1,080 kg (2,380 lb)	43.5 W/kg / 0.026 hp/lb
Chevrolet Kodiak/GMC Topkick LYE 6.6 L	2005	246 kW (330 bhp)	5,126 kg (11,301 lb)	48 W/kg / 0.029 hp/lb
Yamaha PW50 minibike	2019	2 kW (2.7 bhp)	41 kg (90 lb)	49 W/kg / 0.03 hp/lb
Mazda Porter (E360)	1975	24 kW (32 hp)	470 kg (1,040 lb)	51 W/kg / 0.03 hp/lb
Honda Beat	1991	47 kW (63 hp)	760 kg (1,680 lb)	62 W/kg / 0.04 hp/lb
Honda Z series "Monkey Bike"	2018	6.9 kW (9.3 bhp)	107 kg (236 lb)	65 W/kg / 0.04 hp/lb
Autozam AZ-1	1992	47 kW (63 hp)	720 kg (1,590 lb)	65 W/kg / 0.04 hp/lb
Subaru 360	1971	27 kW (36 hp)	410 kg (900 lb)	65.5 W/kg / 0.04 hp/lb
Honda N600	1968	34 kW (46 hp)	508 kg (1,120 lb)	66 W/kg / 0.04 hp/lb
Gibbs Aquada	2004	130.5 kW (175.0 hp)	1,750 kg (3,860 lb)	75 W/kg / 0.045 hp/lb

===== Common power =====
Vehicle	Date	Power	Vehicle weight	Power-to-weight ratio
Toyota Prius 1.8 (petrol only)	2010	73 kW (98 bhp)	1,380 kg (3,040 lb)	53 W/kg / 0.03 hp/lb
Bajaj Platina Naked 100	cc 2006	6 kW (8.0 bhp)	113 kg (249 lb)	53 W/kg / 0.03 hp/lb
Nissan Leaf electric car	2013	80 kW (110 hp)	1,493 kg (3,292 lb)	55 W/kg / 0.03 hp/lb
Subaru R2 type S	2003	47 kW (63 bhp)	830 kg (1,830 lb)	57 W/kg / 0.03 hp/lb
Ford Fiesta ECOnetic 1.6 L TDCi 5dr	2009	66 kW (89 bhp)	1,155 kg (2,546 lb)	57 W/kg / 0.03 hp/lb
Volvo C30 1.6D DRIVe S/S 3dr Hatch	2010	80 kW (110 bhp)	1,347 kg (2,970 lb)	59.4 W/kg / 0.04 hp/lb
Ford Focus ECOnetic 1.6 L TDCi 5dr Hatch	2009	81 kW (109 bhp)	1,357 kg (2,992 lb)	59.7 W/kg / 0.04 hp/lb
Ford Focus 1.8 L Zetec S TDCi 5dr Hatch	2009	84 kW (113 bhp)	1,370 kg (3,020 lb)	61 W/kg / 0.04 hp/lb
Honda FCX Clarity 4 kg Hydrogen	2008	100 kW (130 bhp)	1,600 kg (3,500 lb)	63 W/kg / 0.04 hp/lb
Hummer H1 6.6 L V8	2006	224 kW (300 bhp)	3,559 kg (7,846 lb)	63 W/kg / 0.04 hp/lb
Audi A2 1.4 L TDI 90 type S	2003	66 kW (89 bhp)	1,030 kg (2,270 lb)	64 W/kg / 0.04 hp/lb
Opel/Vauxhall/Holden/Chevrolet Astra 1.7 L CTDi 125	2010	92 kW (123 bhp)	1,393 kg (3,071 lb)	66 W/kg / 0.04 hp/lb
Mini (new) Cooper 1.6D	2007	81 kW (109 bhp)	1,185 kg (2,612 lb)	68 W/kg / 0.04 hp/lb
Volkswagen XL1	2013	55 kW (74 bhp)	795 kg (1,753 lb)	69 W/kg / 0.04 hp/lb
Toyota Prius 1.8 & L (electric boost)	2010	100 kW (130 bhp)	1,380 kg (3,040 lb)	72 W/kg / 0.04 hp/lb
Ford Focus 2.0 L Zetec S TDCi 5dr Hatch	2009	100 kW (130 bhp)	1,370 kg (3,020 lb)	73 W/kg / 0.04 hp/lb
Dodge RAM 1500	2021	194 kW (260 hp)	2,601 kg (5,734 lb)	74.5 W/kg / 0.04 hp/lb
Toyota Venza I4 2.7 L FWD	2009	136 kW (182 bhp)	1,706 kg (3,761 lb)	80 W/kg / 0.05 hp/lb
Ford Focus 2.0 L Zetec S 5dr Hatch	2009	107 kW (143 bhp)	1,327 kg (2,926 lb)	81 W/kg / 0.05 hp/lb
Fiat Grande Punto 1.6 L Multijet 120 2005	2005	88 kW (118 bhp)	1,075 kg (2,370 lb)	82 W/kg / 0.05 hp/lb
Kia Forte	2021	110 kW (150 hp)	1,314 kg (2,897 lb)	83 W/kg / 0.05 hp/lb
Hyundai i20	2014	88 kW (118 hp)	1,045 kg (2,304 lb)	84 W/kg / 0.05 hp/lb
Opel/Vauxhall/Holden/Chevrolet Astra 2.0 L CTDi 160	2010	118 kW (158 bhp)	1,393 kg (3,071 lb)	85 W/kg / 0.05 hp/lb
Hyundai Getz	2008	81 kW (109 hp)	930 kg (2,050 lb)	87 W/kg / 0.05 hp/lb
Ford Focus 2.0 auto	2007	104.4 kW (140.0 bhp)	1,198 kg (2,641 lb)	87.1 W/kg / 0.05 hp/lb
Subaru Legacy/Liberty 2.0R	2005	121 kW (162 bhp)	1,370 kg (3,020 lb)	88 W/kg / 0.05 hp/lb
Kia Sportage 2.4 L 4-cyl. FWD	2021	135 kW (181 hp)	1,499 kg (3,305 lb)	90 W/kg / 0.055 hp/lb
Subaru Outback 2.5i	2008	130.5 kW (175.0 bhp)	1,430 kg (3,150 lb)	91 W/kg / 0.05 hp/lb
Smart Fortwo 1.0 L Brabus	2009	72 kW (97 bhp)	780 kg (1,720 lb)	92 W/kg / 0.05 hp/lb
Honda Odyssey 3.5 L V6	2001	179 kW (240 hp)	1,920 kg (4,230 lb)	93 W/kg / 0.06 hp/lb
Tesla Model 3	2021	165 kW (221 hp)	1,768 kg (3,898 lb)	93 W/kg / 0.06 hp/lb
Nissan Leaf	2018	160 kW (210 hp)	1,580 kg (3,480 lb)	99 W/kg / 0.06 hp/lb
BMW i3	2021	135 kW (181 hp)	1,348 kg (2,972 lb)	100 W/kg / 0.06 hp/lb
Ford Crown Victoria	2004	186 kW (249 hp)	1,840 kg (4,060 lb)	101 W/kg / 0.06 hp/lb
Hyundai Sonata 2.4 L 4-cyl.	2011	147 kW (197 hp)	1,451 kg (3,199 lb)	101 W/kg / 0.06 hp/lb
Mercedes-Benz E 320 CDI	2003	167 kW (224 hp)	1,649 kg (3,635 lb)	101.3 W/kg / 0.06 hp/lb
Acura TSX	2006	153 kW (205 hp)	1,505 kg (3,318 lb)	102 W/kg / 0.06 hp/lb
Hyundai Santa Fe 3.3 L V6	2007	180 kW (240 hp)	1,744.5 kg (3,846 lb)	103 W/kg / 0.06 hp/lb
Chevrolet Express	2021	299 kW (401 hp)	2,858 kg (6,301 lb)	105 W/kg / 0.06 hp/lb
Volvo XC90 4.4 L V8 AWD 4dr	2011	232 kW (311 hp)	2,194 kg (4,837 lb)	106 W/kg / 0.06 hp/lb
Toyota Venza V6 3.5 L AWD	2009	200 kW (270 bhp)	1,835 kg (4,045 lb)	109 W/kg / 0.07 hp/lb
Toyota Venza I4 2.7 L FWD with Lotus mass reduction	2009	136 kW (182 bhp)	1,210 kg (2,670 lb)	112.2 W/kg / 0.07 hp/lb
Toyota Hilux V6 DOHC 4 L 4×2 Single Cab Pickup ute	2009	175 kW (235 bhp)	1,555 kg (3,428 lb)	112.5 W/kg / 0.07 hp/lb
Dodge RAM 2500 6.4 L V8 Hemi	2018	306 kW (410 hp)	2,694 kg (5,939 lb)	113.5 W/kg / 0.07 hp/lb
Toyota Venza V6 3.5 L FWD	2009	200 kW (270 bhp)	1,755 kg (3,869 lb)	114 W/kg / 0.07 hp/lb
Toyota Tacoma 3.5 L V6	2016	207 kW (278 hp)	1,805 kg (3,979 lb)	115 W/kg / 0.07 hp/lb
Toyota Tundra 4.7 L V8	2005	210 kW (280 hp)	1,785 kg (3,935 lb)	118 W/kg / 0.07 hp/lb
Dodge Ram 1500 8.0 L Magnum V10	2002	224 kW (300 hp)	1,885 kg (4,156 lb)	119 W/kg / 0.07 hp/lb
Volkswagen Golf GTI 2.0 L 4-cyl.	2010	157 kW (211 hp)	1,315 kg (2,899 lb)	119 W/kg / 0.07 hp/lb
Toyota Tundra 5.7 L V8	2021	284 kW (381 hp)	2,377 kg (5,240 lb)	119.5 W/kg / 0.07 hp/lb
Nissan Titan	2021	298 kW (400 hp)	2,495 kg (5,501 lb)	120 W/kg / 0.07 hp/lb
Honda Civic Si Coupe	2020	153 kW (205 hp)	1,242 kg (2,738 lb)	123 W/kg / 0.075 hp/lb
Dodge Ram 2500 5.7 L V8 Hemi	2009	291 kW (390 hp)	2,338 kg (5,154 lb)	124 W/kg / 0.075 hp/lb
Acura TL	2004	201 kW (270 hp)	1,579 kg (3,481 lb)	127.5 W/kg / 0.08 hp/lb
Ford Taurus SHO	2009	272 kW (365 hp)	1,990 kg (4,390 lb)	137 W/kg / 0.08 hp/lb
Chevrolet Silverado 6.2 L V8	2021	313 kW (420 hp)	1,996 kg (4,400 lb)	157 W/kg / 0.09 hp/lb
Ford F-150 XL SuperCab 3.5 L PowerBoost V6 twin-turbo hybrid	2021	321 kW (430 hp)	2,090 kg (4,610 lb)	153 W/kg / 0.09 hp/lb
Toyota Tacoma TRD 3.4 L V6	1996	189 kW (253 hp)	1,161 kg (2,560 lb)	163 W/kg / 0.1 hp/lb

===== Performance luxury, roadsters and mild sports =====
Increased engine performance is a consideration, as are other features associated with luxury vehicles. Longitudinal engines are common. Bodies vary from hot hatches, sedans (saloons), coupés, convertibles and roadsters. Mid-range dual-sport and cruiser motorcycles tend to have similar power-to-weight ratios.

Vehicle	Year	Power	Vehicle weight	Power-to-weight ratio
eRuf Model A electric car	2008	150 kW (200 hp)	1,910 kg (4,210 lb)	78.5 W/kg / 0.047 hp/lb
Morgan 3-Wheeler	2021	61 kW (82 hp)	525 kg (1,157 lb)	116.5 W/kg / 0.07 hp/lb
BMW 2002 Turbo	1973	127 kW (170 hp)	1,080 kg (2,380 lb)	117 W/kg / 0.071 hp/lb
Honda Accord sedan V6	2011	202 kW (271 bhp)	1,630 kg (3,590 lb)	124 W/kg / 0.075 hp/lb
Toyota 86/Subaru BRZ	2020	153 kW (205 hp)	1,190 kg (2,620 lb)	128.5 W/kg / 0.078 hp/lb
Mini (new) Cooper 1.6T S JCW	2008	155 kW (208 bhp)	1,205 kg (2,657 lb)	129 W/kg / 0.078 hp/lb
Nissan IDx NISMO	2013	172 kW (231 hp)	1,315 kg (2,899 lb)	130 W/kg / 0.079 hp/lb
Mazda RX-8 1.3 L Wankel	2003	173 kW (232 bhp)	1,309 kg (2,886 lb)	132 W/kg / 0.08 hp/lb
Holden Statesman/Caprice / Buick Park Avenue / Daewoo Veritas 6 L V8	2007	270 kW (360 bhp)	1,891 kg (4,169 lb)	143 W/kg / 0.09 hp/lb
Kawasaki KLR650 Gasoline DualSport 650 cc		26 kW (35 bhp)	182 kg (401 lb)	143 W/kg / 0.09 hp/lb
NATO HTC M1030M1 Diesel/Jet fuel DualSport 670 cc		26 kW (35 bhp)	182 kg (401 lb)	143 W/kg / 0.09 hp/lb
Harley-Davidson FLSTF Softail Fat Boy Cruiser 1,584 cc	2009	47 kW (63 bhp)	324 kg (714 lb)	145 W/kg / 0.09 hp/lb
BMW 7 Series 760Li 6 L V12	2006	327 kW (439 bhp)	2,250 kg (4,960 lb)	145 W/kg / 0.09 hp/lb
Subaru Impreza WRX STi 2.0 L	2008	227 kW (304 bhp)	1,530 kg (3,370 lb)	148 W/kg / 0.09 hp/lb
Kia Stinger GT	2021	272 kW (365 hp)	1,737 kg (3,829 lb)	157 W/kg / 0.095 hp/lb
Opel Speedster	2000	149 kW (200 hp)	930 kg (2,050 lb)	160 W/kg / 0.10 hp/lb
Ginetta G40	2010	130 kW (170 hp)	795 kg (1,753 lb)	164 W/kg / 0.10 hp/lb
Honda Civic Type R	2020	235 kW (315 hp)	1,395 kg (3,075 lb)	169 W/kg / 0.10 hp/lb
GMH HSV Clubsport / GMV VXR8 / GMC CSV CR8 / Pontiac G8 6 L V8	2006	317 kW (425 bhp)	1,831 kg (4,037 lb)	173 W/kg / 0.10 hp/lb
Tesla Roadster	2011	215 kW (288 bhp)	1,235 kg (2,723 lb)	174 W/kg / 0.10 hp/lb
Mercedes-Benz SLK 32 AMG	2001	260 kW (350 hp)	1,495 kg (3,296 lb)	174 W/kg / 0.10 hp/lb
Maserati GranSport	2004	294 kW (394 hp)	1,680 kg (3,700 lb)	175 W/kg / 0.11 hp/lb
Pontiac GTO	2005	298 kW (400 hp)	1,690 kg (3,730 lb)	176.5 W/kg / 0.11 hp/lb
Nissan Fairlady Z NISMO	2013	261 kW (350 hp)	1,466 kg (3,232 lb)	178 W/kg / 0.11 hp/lb

==== Sports vehicles ====
Power-to-weight ratio is an important vehicle characteristic that affects the acceleration of sports vehicles.

Vehicle	Year	Power	Vehicle weight	Power-to-weight ratio
Saleen S331 Supercab	2008	336 kW (451 hp)	2,495 kg (5,501 lb)	134.5 W/kg / 0.08 hp/lb
Lamborghini 63 speedboat	2020	2,983 kW (4,000 hp)	21,172 kg (46,676 lb)	137 W/kg / 0.08 hp/lb
Mercedes-Benz #24 Tankpool24 European Truck Racing Championship racing truck	2015	783 kW (1,050 hp)	5,500 kg (12,100 lb)	142 W/kg / 0.09 hp/lb
Top Gear Track-Tor	2018	373 kW (500 hp)	2,495 kg (5,501 lb)	149.5 W/kg / 0.09 hp/lb
Nissan 350Z	2007	228 kW (306 hp)	1,515 kg (3,340 lb)	151 W/kg / 0.09 hp/lb
Mazda RX-7 Spirit R (Type A)	2002	206 kW (276 hp)	1,270 kg (2,800 lb)	162 W/kg / 0.10 hp/lb
Jaguar XJ	2003	298 kW (400 hp)	1,790 kg (3,950 lb)	167 W/kg / 0.10 hp/lb
BMW 1M Coupé	2011	250 kW (340 hp)	1,495 kg (3,296 lb)	167 W/kg / 0.10 hp/lb
Porsche Boxster	2007	217 kW (291 hp)	1,295 kg (2,855 lb)	167.5 W/kg / 0.10 hp/lb
Dodge Ram Rebel TRX	2021	523.5 kW (702.0 hp)	3,114 kg (6,865 lb)	168 W/kg / 0.10 hp/lb
BMW Z3 BMW M Coupé and Roadster	2002	239 kW (321 hp)	1,420 kg (3,130 lb)	168.5 W/kg / 0.10 hp/lb
Nissan 370Z NISMO	2009	261 kW (350 hp)	1,466 kg (3,232 lb)	178 W/kg / 0.11 hp/lb
BMW i8	2020	275 kW (369 hp)	1,539 kg (3,393 lb)	179 W/kg / 0.11 hp/lb
Lotus Elise SC	2008	163 kW (219 hp)	910 kg (2,010 lb)	179 W/kg / 0.11 hp/lb
Mitsubishi Lancer Evolution WRC	2001	221 kW (296 hp)	1,230 kg (2,710 lb)	179 W/kg / 0.11 hp/lb
Lotus Evora S	2010	258 kW (346 hp)	1,437 kg (3,168 lb)	179.5 W/kg / 0.11 hp/lb
Aussie Racing Cars silhouette race car		93 kW (125 hp)	515 kg (1,135 lb)	181 W/kg / 0.11 hp/lb
Audi TT RS plus	2012	265 kW (355 hp)	1,450 kg (3,200 lb)	183 W/kg / 0.11 hp/lb
Can-Am Spyder RT		86 kW (115 hp)	464 kg (1,023 lb)	185 W/kg / 0.11 hp/lb
Hennessey VelociRaptor 6x6	2020	565 kW (758 hp)	3,038 kg (6,698 lb)	186 W/kg / 0.11 hp/lb
Bentley Bentayga	2020	467 kW (626 hp)	2,440 kg (5,380 lb)	191 W/kg / 0.12 hp/lb
KF1 kart racing go-kart		30 kW (40 hp)	154 kg (340 lb)	193.4 W/kg / 0.12 hp/lb
Citroën DS3 WRC rally car	2011	235 kW (315 hp)	1,200 kg (2,600 lb)	196 W/kg / 0.12 hp/lb
Alpine A110S	2017	221 kW (296 hp)	1,114 kg (2,456 lb)	198 W/kg / 0.12 hp/lb
Lotus 340R	2000	139 kW (186 hp)	701 kg (1,545 lb)	199 W/kg / 0.12 hp/lb
Alfa Romeo 4C	2013	177 kW (237 hp)	895 kg (1,973 lb)	199 W/kg / 0.12 hp/lb
Artega GT		220 kW (300 hp)	1,100 kg (2,400 lb)	200 W/kg / 0.12 hp/lb
Suzuki GSX-R/4	2001	129 kW (173 hp)	640 kg (1,410 lb)	202 W/kg / 0.12 hp/lb
BMW M5	2004	373 kW (500 hp)	1,848 kg (4,074 lb)	202 W/kg / 0.12 hp/lb
Mastretta MXT	2011	184 kW (247 hp)	900 kg (2,000 lb)	205 W/kg / 0.12 hp/lb
Audi R8 Spyder 4.2 FSI Quattro	2011	319 kW (428 hp)	1,560 kg (3,440 lb)	205 W/kg / 0.12 hp/lb
Monster Jam monster trucks		1,118.5 kW (1,499.9 hp)	5,443 kg (12,000 lb)	205.5 W/kg / 0.125 hp/lb
Lotus Exige GT3	2006	202.1 kW (271.0 hp)	980 kg (2,160 lb)	206 W/kg / 0.12 hp/lb
Mercedes-Benz E 63 AMG	2009	378 kW (507 hp)	1,830 kg (4,030 lb)	207 W/kg / 0.125 hp/lb
Ligier JS F4 Formula 4	2016	119 kW (160 hp)	570 kg (1,260 lb)	209 W/kg / 0.13 hp/lb
BMW M3 GTR	2001	285 kW (382 hp)	1,350 kg (2,980 lb)	211 W/kg / 0.13 hp/lb
Porsche 718 Cayman GT4	2019	309 kW (414 hp)	1,451 kg (3,199 lb)	213 W/kg / 0.13 hp/lb
FPV FG GT-F 351	2014	404 kW (542 hp)	1,880 kg (4,140 lb)	215 W/kg / 0.13 hp/lb
Gibbs Quadski		130.5 kW (175.0 hp)	605 kg (1,334 lb)	216 W/kg / 0.13 hp/lb
Porsche Cayman GT4	2015	283 kW (380 hp)	1,310 kg (2,890 lb)	216 W/kg / 0.13 hp/lb
Alfa Romeo Giulia Quadrifolio	2021	377 kW (506 hp)	1,734 kg (3,823 lb)	217 W/kg / 0.13 hp/lb
Lamborghini Urus	2019	478 kW (641 hp)	2,200 kg (4,900 lb)	217 W/kg / 0.13 hp/lb
Audi e-tron GT	2020	482 kW (646 hp)	2,200 kg (4,900 lb)	219 W/kg / 0.13 hp/lb
Ferrari 360 Challenge Stradale	2003	313 kW (420 hp)	1,430 kg (3,150 lb)	219 W/kg / 0.13 hp/lb
Mercedes-Benz C 63 AMG Coupé Black Series	2011	380 kW (510 hp)	1,748 kg (3,854 lb)	220.5 W/kg / 0.13 hp/lb
Chevrolet Corvette C6	2008	321 kW (430 hp)	1,441 kg (3,177 lb)	223 W/kg / 0.13 hp/lb
Spark-Renault SRT_01E Formula E	2014	201 kW (270 hp)	898 kg (1,980 lb)	224 W/kg / 0.14 hp/lb
Bentley Continental Supersports	2017	522 kW (700 hp)	2,320 kg (5,110 lb)	225 W/kg / 0.14 hp/lb
Nissan GT-R R35 3.8 L Turbo V6		406 kW (544 hp)	1,779 kg (3,922 lb)	228 W/kg / 0.14 hp/lb
Aston Martin DB9 GT	2015	402 kW (539 hp)	1,760 kg (3,880 lb)	229 W/kg / 0.14 hp/lb
Mygale FB02 Formula BMW	2001	100 kW (130 hp)	455 kg (1,003 lb)	229.5 W/kg / 0.14 hp/lb
Dirt Modified US Legend Cars		104 kW (139 hp)	454 kg (1,001 lb)	230 W/kg / 0.14 hp/lb
Aston Martin Vantage N24	2006	306 kW (410 hp)	1,330 kg (2,930 lb)	230 W/kg / 0.14 hp/lb
Tesla Model S P85D 85kWh AWD Performance		515 kW (691 hp)	2,239 kg (4,936 lb)	230 W/kg / 0.14 hp/lb
Ford Mustang Shelby GT350R	2020	392 kW (526 hp)	1,686 kg (3,717 lb)	233 W/kg / 0.14 hp/lb
Vauxhall VXR8	2017	438 kW (587 hp)	1,880 kg (4,140 lb)	233 W/kg / 0.14 hp/lb
Ford Fiesta WRC	2017	283 kW (380 hp)	1,200 kg (2,600 lb)	236 W/kg / 0.14 hp/lb
Bowler EXR-S	2013	410 kW (550 hp)	1,730.5 kg (3,815 lb)	237 W/kg / 0.14 hp/lb
Hyundai i20 WRC	2021	283 kW (380 hp)	1,190 kg (2,620 lb)	238 W/kg / 0.14 hp/lb
Ferrari California T	2014	412 kW (553 hp)	1,730 kg (3,810 lb)	238 W/kg / 0.14 hp/lb
Spyker C8 Laviolette	2001	298 kW (400 hp)	1,250 kg (2,760 lb)	239 W/kg / 0.145 hp/lb
BMW X5 LM	2000	522 kW (700 hp)	2,170 kg (4,780 lb)	240.5 W/kg / 0.15 hp/lb
Spark ODYSSEY 21 Extreme E	2021	400 kW (540 hp)	1,650 kg (3,640 lb)	242 W/kg / 0.15 hp/lb
TVR Tamora	2002	261 kW (350 hp)	1,050 kg (2,310 lb)	248.5 W/kg / 0.15 hp/lb
Jaguar XKR-S	2011	404 kW (542 hp)	1,595 kg (3,516 lb)	253 W/kg / 0.15 hp/lb
Porsche Taycan Turbo S		560 kW (750 hp)	2,295 kg (5,060 lb)	244 W/kg / 0.15 hp/lb
Jeep Trailcat	2016	527 kW (707 hp)	2,087 kg (4,601 lb)	253 W/kg / 0.15 hp/lb
Aston Martin V12 Vantage S	2013	421 kW (565 hp)	1,665 kg (3,671 lb)	253 W/kg / 0.15 hp/lb
Ford GT	2005	410 kW (550 hp)	1,581 kg (3,486 lb)	259.5 W/kg / 0.16 hp/lb
Ferrari 430 Scuderia	2007	375 kW (503 hp)	1,429 kg (3,150 lb)	262.5 W/kg / 0.16 hp/lb
Tatuus USF-17 U.S. F2000	2017	130.5 kW (175.0 hp)	497 kg (1,096 lb)	263 W/kg / 0.16 hp/lb
Mercedes-Benz SL65 AMG Black Series	2008	493 kW (661 hp)	1,870 kg (4,120 lb)	264 W/kg / 0.16 hp/lb
Jaguar F-Type SVR	2016	423 kW (567 hp)	1,597 kg (3,521 lb)	265 W/kg / 0.16 hp/lb
Chevrolet Corvette C6 Z06		376 kW (504 hp)	1,421 kg (3,133 lb)	265 W/kg / 0.16 hp/lb
Porsche 911 GT3 RS	2018	382 kW (512 hp)	1,430 kg (3,150 lb)	267.5 W/kg / 0.16 hp/lb
Porsche 911 (996) GT2	2002	355 kW (476 hp)	1,317 kg (2,903 lb)	269.5 W/kg / 0.16 hp/lb
Porsche 911 GT2	2007	390 kW (520 hp)	1,440 kg (3,170 lb)	271 W/kg / 0.16 hp/lb
Spark SRT05e Formula E	2018	250 kW (340 hp)	900 kg (2,000 lb)	278 W/kg / 0.17 hp/lb
Lexus LF-A	2010	412 kW (553 hp)	1,480 kg (3,260 lb)	278 W/kg / 0.17 hp/lb
Lotus 2-Eleven	2007	188 kW (252 hp)	670 kg (1,480 lb)	280.5 W/kg / 0.17 hp/lb
TVR Sagaris	2005	303 kW / 406 kW	1,078 kg (2,377 lb)	281 W/kg / 0.17 hp/lb
KTM X-Bow R	2011	224 kW (300 hp)	790 kg (1,740 lb)	283 W/kg / 0.17 hp/lb
Ferrari 458 Speciale	2013	445 kW (597 hp)	1,565 kg (3,450 lb)	284.5 W/kg / 0.17 hp/lb
Dodge Charger Hellcat Redeye	2021	594 kW (797 hp)	2,086.5 kg (4,600 lb)	285 W/kg / 0.17 hp/lb
Jeep Hurricane	2005	500 kW (670 hp)	1,746 kg (3,849 lb)	286 W/kg / 0.17 hp/lb
Chevrolet Corvette C7.R GT3	2014	366 kW (491 hp)	1,245 kg (2,745 lb)	294 W/kg / 0.18 hp/lb
Caterham Aero 7	2013	177 kW (237 hp)	600 kg (1,300 lb)	294.5 W/kg / 0.18 hp/lb
Bugatti 16C Galibier	2009	735 kW (986 hp)	2,495 kg (5,501 lb)	295 W/kg / 0.18 hp/lb
TVR Tuscan Speed Six	2003	328 kW (440 hp)	1,100 kg (2,400 lb)	298 W/kg / 0.18 hp/lb
Mercedes-Benz SLS AMG Black Series	2013	464 kW (622 hp)	1,549 kg (3,415 lb)	299 W/kg / 0.18 hp/lb
Chevrolet Corvette C8.R GT3	2020	373 kW (500 hp)	1,240 kg (2,730 lb)	301 W/kg / 0.18 hp/lb
Westfield Megabusa	2005	132 kW (177 hp)	440 kg (970 lb)	302 W/kg / 0.18 hp/lb
Honda ST1300 sport touring motorcycle	2013	87 kW (117 hp)	286 kg (631 lb)	305 W/kg / 0.185 hp/lb
Dallara F312 Formula 3	2012	179 kW (240 hp)	580 kg (1,280 lb)	308.5 W/kg / 0.19 hp/lb
Mercedes-Benz C-Coupé DTM touring car	2012	343 kW (460 hp)	1,110 kg (2,450 lb)	309 W/kg / 0.19 hp/lb
Maserati MC20	2021	464 kW (622 hp)	1,500 kg (3,300 lb)	309 W/kg / 0.19 hp/lb
McLaren 570S	2020	419 kW (562 hp)	1,356 kg (2,989 lb)	309 W/kg / 0.19 hp/lb
Ascari KZ1-R	2005	388 kW (520 hp)	1,250 kg (2,760 lb)	310 W/kg / 0.19 hp/lb
Lamborghini Gallardo LP 570-4 Superleggera	2010	419 kW (562 hp)	1,340 kg (2,950 lb)	313 W/kg / 0.19 hp/lb
BMW R1200RT sport touring motorcycle	2005	81 kW (109 hp)	259 kg (571 lb)	314 W/kg / 0.19 hp/lb
McLaren 620R	2020	456 kW (612 hp)	1,453 kg (3,203 lb)	314 W/kg / 0.19 hp/lb
Fiat X1/9 Polini 04 Evo	-	174 kW (233 hp)	550 kg (1,210 lb)	316 W/kg / 0.19 hp/lb
Honda NSX GT500	2005	370 kW (500 hp)	1,180 kg (2,600 lb)	316 W/kg / 0.19 hp/lb
Callaway C16	2007	485 kW (650 hp)	1,531 kg (3,375 lb)	317 W/kg / 0.19 hp/lb
Saleen S5S Raptor	2008	485 kW (650 hp)	1,526 kg (3,364 lb)	317.5 W/kg / 0.19 hp/lb
Lamborghini Murciélago LP 670-4 SV	2009	493 kW (661 hp)	1,550 kg (3,420 lb)	318 W/kg / 0.19 hp/lb
Formula Renault 2.0 Eurocup car	2016	157 kW (211 hp)	490 kg (1,080 lb)	319.5 W/kg / 0.19 hp/lb
McLaren MP4-12C	2012	459 kW (616 hp)	1,434 kg (3,161 lb)	320 W/kg / 0.195 hp/lb
Ruf Turbo R Limited	2016	462 kW (620 hp)	1,440 kg (3,170 lb)	321 W/kg / 0.195 hp/lb
Dodge Viper	2015	481 kW (645 hp)	1,495 kg (3,296 lb)	321.6 W/kg / 0.195 hp/lb
Vemac RD320R Super GT GT300	2002	283 kW (380 hp)	880 kg (1,940 lb)	322 W/kg / 0.20 hp/lb
Ford Mustang Shelby GT500 Super Snake	2020	615 kW (825 hp)	1,905 kg (4,200 lb)	323 W/kg / 0.20 hp/lb
Ford GT	2020	492 kW (660 hp)	1,521 kg (3,353 lb)	323.5 W/kg / 0.20 hp/lb
Westfield XTR2	2005	132 kW (177 hp)	410 kg (900 lb)	324 W/kg / 0.20 hp/lb
Dodge Challenger SRT Demon	2018	626 kW (839 hp)	1,930 kg (4,250 lb)	324.5 W/kg / 0.20 hp/lb
Audi Rosemeyer	2000	522 kW (700 hp)	1,607 kg (3,543 lb)	325 W/kg / 0.20 hp/lb
BMW M3 DTM	2012	358 kW (480 hp)	1,100 kg (2,400 lb)	325 W/kg / 0.20 hp/lb
Porsche Carrera GT	2004	450 kW (600 hp)	1,380 kg (3,040 lb)	326 W/kg / 0.20 hp/lb
Audi A4 DTM	2005	343 kW (460 hp)	1,050 kg (2,310 lb)	327 W/kg / 0.20 hp/lb
Cadillac Sixteen	2003	746 kW (1,000 hp)	2,270 kg (5,000 lb)	328.5 W/kg / 0.20 hp/lb
Ferrari 458 Italia GT3	2011	410 kW (550 hp)	1,245 kg (2,745 lb)	329 W/kg / 0.20 hp/lb
Mercedes-Benz AMG C-Class DTM	2007	343 kW (460 hp)	1,040 kg (2,290 lb)	330 W/kg / 0.20 hp/lb
Dallara GP3/10 GP3 Series	2010	209 kW (280 hp)	630 kg (1,390 lb)	331 W/kg / 0.20 hp/lb
Ginetta G50Z	2008	365 kW (489 hp)	1,100 kg (2,400 lb)	332 W/kg/ 0.20 hp/lb
Peugeot 206 2K8-4	-	291 kW (390 hp)	850 kg (1,870 lb)	333 W/kg / 0.20 hp/lb
McLaren Artura	2021	500 kW (670 hp)	1,498 kg (3,303 lb)	334 W/kg / 0.20 hp/lb
Alpine A110-50	2012	294.5 kW (394.9 hp)	880 kg (1,940 lb)	335 W/kg / 0.20 hp/lb
Ferrari F430 GT3	2006	410 kW (550 hp)	1,219 kg (2,687 lb)	336.5 W/kg / 0.20 hp/lb
Sierra RX3	2020	149 kW (200 hp)	442.25 kg (975.0 lb)	337 W/kg / 0.20 hp/lb
Caterham 7 CSR-260	2005	194 kW (260 hp)	575 kg (1,268 lb)	337 W/kg / 0.20 hp/lb
Ferrari 812 Superfast	2017	588 kW (789 hp)	1,744 kg (3,845 lb)	337 W/kg / 0.20 hp/lb
NASCAR Camping World Truck Series pickup trucks		522 kW (700 hp)	1,542 kg (3,400 lb)	338.5 W/kg / 0.20 hp/lb
Rage R180 dune buggy	-	134 kW (180 hp)	395 kg (871 lb)	340 W/kg / 0.21 hp/lb
Stadium Super Truck		450 kW (600 hp)	1,300 kg (2,900 lb)	340 W/kg / 0.21 hp/lb
Lamborghini Huracán LP 640-4 Performanté	2017	470.5 kW (631.0 hp)	1,382 kg (3,047 lb)	340.5 W/kg / 0.21 hp/lb
KTM 450 EXC-F	2021	38 kW (51 hp)	111 kg (245 lb)	342 W/kg / 0.21 hp/lb
Aston Martin One-77	2009	559 kW (750 hp)	1,630 kg (3,590 lb)	343 W/kg / 0.21 hp/lb
Renault Mégane RS RX1 Supercar	-	450 kW (600 hp)	1,300 kg (2,900 lb)	344 W/kg / 0.21 hp/lb
Bentley Continental GT3	2013	450 kW (600 hp)	1,300 kg (2,900 lb)	344 W/kg / 0.21 hp/lb
Dallara Stradale	2017	294 kW (394 hp)	855 kg (1,885 lb)	344.5 W/kg / 0.21 hp/lb
Australian V8 Supercars		485 kW (650 hp)	1,395 kg (3,075 lb)	347.5 W/kg / 0.21 hp/lb
Maserati Birdcage 75th	2005	522 kW (700 hp)	1,500 kg (3,300 lb)	349 W/kg / 0.21 hp/lb
Chevrolet Corvette C7 ZR-1	2019	563 kW (755 hp)	1,615 kg (3,560 lb)	349 W/kg / 0.21 hp/lb
Joss JT1	2004	328 kW (440 hp)	940 kg (2,070 lb)	349 W/kg / 0.21 hp/lb
Porsche 911 GT2 RS	2017	515 kW (691 hp)	1,470 kg (3,240 lb)	350.5 W/kg / 0.21 hp/lb
Chevrolet Corvette C6.R GT1	2005	440 kW (590 hp)	1,245 kg (2,745 lb)	353 W/kg / 0.21 hp/lb
Touring Superlegrra Arese RH95	2021	530 kW (710 hp)	1,497 kg (3,300 lb)	354 W/kg / 0.21 hp/lb
Sector111 Drakan Spyder		321 kW (430 hp)	907 kg (2,000 lb)	354 W/kg / 0.21 hp/lb
Verge TS electric motorcycle	2019	80 kW (110 hp)	225 kg (496 lb)	356 W/kg / 0.22 hp/lb
Enzo Ferrari	2002	485 kW (650 hp)	1,365 kg (3,009 lb)	356 W/kg / 0.22 hp/lb
Ligier JS P320 LMP3	2019	339 kW (455 hp)	950 kg (2,090 lb)	357 W/kg / 0.22 hp/lb
Ginetta G61-LT-P3 LMP3	2019	339 kW (455 hp)	950 kg (2,090 lb)	357 W/kg / 0.22 hp/lb
Ruf Rt 12 R	2011	537 kW (720 hp)	1,500 kg (3,300 lb)	358 W/kg / 0.22 hp/lb
Ferrari 599XX Evoluzione	2011	544 kW (730 hp)	1,504 kg (3,316 lb)	362 W/kg / 0.22 hp/lb
Ascari A10	2006	466 kW (625 hp)	1,280 kg (2,820 lb)	364 W/kg / 0.22 hp/lb
Superkart		75 kW (101 hp)	200 kg (440 lb)	365 W/kg / 0.22 hp/lb
Volkswagen W-12 Nardò	2001	441 kW (591 hp)	1,200 kg (2,600 lb)	367 W/kg / 0.22 hp/lb
Ferrari F8	2019	530 kW (710 hp)	1,435 kg (3,164 lb)	369 W/kg / 0.22 hp/lb
Ducati Monster 696	2008	59 kW (79 hp)	161 kg (355 lb)	370.5 W/kg / 0.225 hp/lb
Lamborghini Aventador SVJ LP770-4	2018	566 kW (759 hp)	1,525 kg (3,362 lb)	372 W/kg / 0.23 hp/lb
Lamborghini Asterion	2014	670 kW (900 hp)	1,800 kg (4,000 lb)	372 W/kg / 0.23 hp/lb
Drako GTE	2020	895 kW (1,200 hp)	2,404 kg (5,300 lb)	372 W/kg / 0.23 hp/lb
Cadillac Cien	2002	559 kW (750 hp)	1,500 kg (3,300 lb)	373 W/kg / 0.23 hp/lb
Zenos E10 R	2016	261 kW (350 hp)	700 kg (1,500 lb)	373 W/kg / 0.23 hp/lb
R.J. Anderson #37 Polaris RZR-Rockstar Energy Pro 2 trophy truck	2016	634 kW (850 hp)	1,701 kg (3,750 lb)	373 W/kg / 0.23 hp/lb
McLaren 675LT	2016	497 kW (666 hp)	1,328 kg (2,928 lb)	374 W/kg / 0.23 hp/lb
Tesla Model S Plaid+	2021	820 kW (1,100 hp)	2,162 kg (4,766 lb)	379 W/kg / 0.23 hp/lb
Lucid Air Dream Edition	2021	805 kW (1,080 hp)	2,100 kg (4,600 lb)	383.5 W/kg / 0.23 hp/lb
Lotus 3-Eleven	2015	343 kW (460 hp)	890 kg (1,960 lb)	385 W/kg / 0.23 hp/lb
Bugatti Veyron 16.4	2005	736 kW (987 hp)	1,888 kg (4,162 lb)	390 W/kg / 0.24 hp/lb
Honda Project 2&4	2015	158 kW (212 hp)	405 kg (893 lb)	390 W/kg / 0.24 hp/lb
Canepa Design Porsche 959	2018	569 kW (763 hp)	1,450 kg (3,200 lb)	392 W/kg / 0.24 hp/lb
BAC Mono	2011	213 kW (286 hp)	540 kg (1,190 lb)	394 W/kg / 0.24 hp/lb
Ruf RTR	2013	590 kW (790 hp)	1,490 kg (3,280 lb)	396 W/kg / 0.24 hp/lb
Lamborghini Sián FKP 37	2020	602 kW (807 hp)	1,520 kg (3,350 lb)	396 W/kg / 0.24 hp/lb
SEMOG GSX-R750 Crosskart	-	119 kW (160 hp)	300 kg (660 lb)	398 W/kg / 0.24 hp/lb
Aston Martin DBR9 GT1	2005	466 kW (625 hp)	1,170 kg (2,580 lb)	398 W/kg / 0.24 hp/lb
Ferrari Monza SP1	2019	596.5 kW (799.9 hp)	1,500 kg (3,300 lb)	398 W/kg / 0.24 hp/lb
Volvo Iron Knight	2016	1,790 kW (2,400 hp)	4,500 kg (9,900 lb)	398 W/kg / 0.24 hp/lb
Porsche 918 Spyder	2015	661 kW (886 hp)	1,656 kg (3,651 lb)	399 W/kg / 0.24 hp/lb
Mercedes-Benz Vision EQ Silver Arrow	2018	559 kW (750 hp)	1,400 kg (3,100 lb)	399.5 W/kg / 0.24 hp/lb
Donkervoort D8 GTO	2013	280 kW (380 hp)	695 kg (1,532 lb)	402 W/kg / 0.24 hp/lb
Venturi Buckeye Bullet 3 land speed record electric vehicle	2016	1,480 kW (1,980 hp)	3,629 kg (8,001 lb)	408 W/kg / 0.25 hp/lb
Tatuus PM-18 Pro Mazda	2018	205 kW (275 hp)	500 kg (1,100 lb)	410 W/kg / 0.25 hp/lb
Ferrari P4/5	2006	492 kW (660 hp)	1,200 kg (2,600 lb)	410 W/kg / 0.25 hp/lb
Caterham SP/300.R	2012	224 kW (300 hp)	545 kg (1,202 lb)	410.5 W/kg / 0.25 hp/lb
Pagani Zonda Cinque	2009	499 kW (669 hp)	1,210 kg (2,670 lb)	412 W/kg / 0.25 hp/lb
Ferrari 488 GT Modificata	2020	515 kW (691 hp)	1,245 kg (2,745 lb)	413 W/kg / 0.25 hp/lb
Audi e-tron Vision Gran Turismo	2018	600 kW (800 hp)	1,450 kg (3,200 lb)	413.5 W/kg / 0.25 hp/lb
JCB Dieselmax land speed record streamliner	2006	1,118.5 kW (1,499.9 hp)	2,700 kg (6,000 lb)	414 W/kg / 0.25 hp/lb
Energica Ego+ electric motorcycle	2019	107 kW (143 hp)	258 kg (569 lb)	415 W/kg / 0.25 hp/lb
Ferrari 296 GTB	2022	610 kW (820 hp)	1,470 kg (3,240 lb)	415 W/kg / 0.25 hp/lb
Ruf CTR3 Clubsport	2012	571 kW (766 hp)	1,377 kg (3,036 lb)	415 W/kg / 0.25 hp/lb
Koenigsegg CC8S	2002	488 kW (654 hp)	1,175 kg (2,590 lb)	416 W/kg / 0.25 hp/lb
Hennessey CTS-V	2020	746 kW (1,000 hp)	1,792 kg (3,951 lb)	416 W/kg / 0.25 hp/lb
Aston Martin Victor	2020	623 kW (835 hp)	1,497 kg (3,300 lb)	416.5 W/kg / 0.25 hp/lb
Lamborghini Sesto Elemento	2010	419 kW (562 hp)	999 kg (2,202 lb)	419.5 W/kg / 0.25 hp/lb
McLaren 765LT	2020	563 kW (755 hp)	1,339 kg (2,952 lb)	420.5 W/kg / 0.25 hp/lb
Dallara F3 2019 Formula 3	2019	283 kW (380 hp)	673 kg (1,484 lb)	421 W/kg / 0.26 hp/lb
W Motors Lykan HyperSport	2014	581.6 kW (779.9 hp)	1,380 kg (3,040 lb)	421.5 W/kg / 0.26 hp/lb
Edo Competition Porsche Carrera GT	-	574 kW (770 hp)	1,362 kg (3,003 lb)	422 W/kg / 0.26 hp/lb
Honda NSF250R Moto3	2021	35.5 kW (47.6 hp)	84 kg (185 lb)	423 W/kg / 0.26 hp/lb
Praga R1	2021	272 kW (365 hp)	643 kg (1,418 lb)	423 W/kg / 0.26 hp/lb
Ariel Atom 3S	2014	272 kW (365 hp)	639 kg (1,409 lb)	426 W/kg / 0.26 hp/lb
Scuderia Cameron Glickenhaus SCG 003	2014	559 kW (750 hp)	1,300 kg (2,900 lb)	430 W/kg / 0.26 hp/lb
unrestricted NASCAR Sprint Cup Series stock cars		671 kW (900 hp)	1,542 kg (3,400 lb)	435 W/kg / 0.26 hp/lb
Hennessey Exorcist Camaro	2021	746 kW (1,000 hp)	1,705.5 kg (3,760 lb)	437 W/kg / 0.26 hp/lb
Ken Block's Gymkhana Ford Fiesta RS	-	485 kW (650 hp)	1,100 kg (2,400 lb)	441 W/kg / 0.27 hp/lb
W Motors Fenyr SuperSport	2019	596 kW (799 hp)	1,350 kg (2,980 lb)	441 W/kg / 0.27 hp/lb
Lamborghini Essenza SCV12	2020	610 kW (820 hp)	1,376 kg (3,034 lb)	444 W/kg / 0.27 hp/lb
Elemental RP1	2021	276 kW (370 hp)	620 kg (1,370 lb)	445 W/kg / 0.27 hp/lb
LaFerrari	2015	708 kW (949 hp)	1,585 kg (3,494 lb)	447 W/kg / 0.27 hp/lb
Volkswagen I.D. R	2018	507 kW (680 hp)	1,100 kg (2,400 lb)	447 W/kg / 0.27 hp/lb
Fittipaldi EF7	2018	450 kW (600 hp)	1,000 kg (2,200 lb)	447 W/kg / 0.27 hp/lb
Mosler MT900S	2003	450 kW (600 hp)	998 kg (2,200 lb)	448 W/kg / 0.27 hp/lb
Dallara GP3/16 GP3 Series	2016	298 kW (400 hp)	661 kg (1,457 lb)	451 W/kg / 0.27 hp/lb
VUHL 05RR	2016	298 kW (400 hp)	660 kg (1,460 lb)	452 W/kg / 0.27 hp/lb
McLaren P1	2013	673 kW (903 hp)	1,490 kg (3,280 lb)	452 W/kg / 0.27 hp/lb
Aston Martin Vulcan	2015	611 kW (819 hp)	1,350 kg (2,980 lb)	453 W/kg / 0.27 hp/lb
KTM RC250R	2013	37 kW (50 hp)	82 kg (181 lb)	455 W/kg / 0.28 hp/lb
McLaren Elva	2021	600 kW (800 hp)	1,315 kg (2,899 lb)	456 W/kg / 0.28 hp/lb
Hulme F1	2020	450 kW (600 hp)	980 kg (2,160 lb)	456.5 W/kg / 0.28 hp/lb
Formula E Gen3	2022	350 kW (470 hp)	760 kg (1,680 lb)	460.5 W/kg / 0.28 hp/lb
Mercedes-AMG ONE	2022	782 kW (1,049 hp)	1,695 kg (3,737 lb)	461 W/kg / 0.281 hp/lb
Arc Vector electric motorcycle	2018	102 kW (137 hp)	220 kg (490 lb)	464 W/kg / 0.28 hp/lb
Apollo Intensa Emozione	2019	582 kW (780 hp)	1,250 kg (2,760 lb)	465 W/kg / 0.28 hp/lb
Audi RS5 Turbo DTM	2020	500 kW (670 hp)	1,070 kg (2,360 lb)	467 W/kg / 0.28 hp/lb
Honda CBR600RR	2021	89 kW (119 hp)	194 kg (428 lb)	467 W/kg / 0.28 hp/lb
Ferrari SF90 Stradale	2019	735 kW (986 hp)	1,570 kg (3,460 lb)	468 W/kg / 0.285 hp/lb
Dallara GP3/13 GP3 Series	2013	298 kW (400 hp)	630 kg (1,390 lb)	473.5 W/kg / 0.29 hp/lb
Hennessey Viper Venom 1000 Twin Turbo	2005	746 kW (1,000 hp)	1,574 kg (3,470 lb)	474 W/kg / 0.29 hp/lb
De Tomaso P72	2020	522 kW (700 hp)	1,100 kg (2,400 lb)	474.5 W/kg / 0.29 hp/lb
Fiat Abarth 500 twin-Hayabusa V8	-	261 kW (350 hp)	550 kg (1,210 lb)	475 W/kg / 0.29 hp/lb
Acura ARX-01b Le Mans Prototype	2008	380 kW (510 hp)	800 kg (1,800 lb)	475 W/kg / 0.29 hp/lb
Ginetta G58 sports prototype	2018	429 kW (575 hp)	900 kg (2,000 lb)	476 W/kg / 0.29 hp/lb
Lotus Elise GT1		453 kW (607 hp)	950 kg (2,090 lb)	476.5 W/kg / 0.29 hp/lb
Bugatti Veyron 16.4 Super Sport	2010	882 kW (1,183 hp)	1,834 kg (4,043 lb)	481 W/kg / 0.29 hp/lb
Zenvo ST1	2009	812 kW (1,089 hp)	1,688 kg (3,721 lb)	481 W/kg / 0.29 hp/lb
Acura ARX-05 DPi sports prototype	2018	450 kW (600 hp)	930 kg (2,050 lb)	481 W/kg / 0.29 hp/lb
Chrysler ME Four-Twelve	2004	634 kW (850 hp)	1,310 kg (2,890 lb)	484 W/kg / 0.29 hp/lb
Oreca 07 Le Mans Prototype	2017	450 kW (600 hp)	930 kg (2,050 lb)	484 W/kg / 0.29 hp/lb
Aprilia RSV 1000 R	2004	104 kW (139 hp)	214 kg (472 lb)	484 W/kg / 0.29 hp/lb
BRM 1000 SuperQuad "Quadzilla"	2002	107 kW (143 hp)	220 kg (490 lb)	485 W/kg / 0.295 hp/lb
Bristol Fighter T	2006	755 kW (1,012 hp)	1,543 kg (3,402 lb)	489 W/kg / 0.30 hp/lb
Maserati MC12 Versione Corse	2006	563 kW (755 hp)	1,150 kg (2,540 lb)	489.5 W/kg / 0.30 hp/lb
McLaren Senna	2019	588 kW (789 hp)	1,198 kg (2,641 lb)	491 W/kg / 0.30 hp/lb
Rimac Concept One	2013	913 kW (1,224 hp)	1,850 kg (4,080 lb)	493.5 W/kg / 0.30 hp/lb
Gumpert Apollo Enraged	2012	582 kW (780 hp)	1,175 kg (2,590 lb)	495 W/kg / 0.30 hp/lb
Pagani Huayra Imola	2020	617 kW (827 hp)	1,246 kg (2,747 lb)	495 W/kg / 0.30 hp/lb
Mazda Furai	2008	336 kW (451 hp)	675 kg (1,488 lb)	497 W/kg / 0.30 hp/lb
Ascari A410 Le Mans Prototype	2000	450 kW (600 hp)	900 kg (2,000 lb)	497 W/kg / 0.30 hp/lb
Courage C60 Le Mans Prototype	2005	450 kW (600 hp)	900 kg (2,000 lb)	497 W/kg / 0.30 hp/lb
Radical SR8LM	2007	339 kW (455 hp)	680 kg (1,500 lb)	498.5 W/kg / 0.30 hp/lb
Thunderbolt land speed record car		3,504 kW (4,699 hp)	7,000 kg (15,000 lb)	500 W/kg / 0.30 hp/lb
Trans-Am Series sports cars		634 kW (850 hp)	1,261 kg (2,780 lb)	503 W/kg / 0.31 hp/lb
Hispano-Suiza Carmen Boulogne	2021	820 kW (1,100 hp)	1,630 kg (3,590 lb)	503 W/kg / 0.31 hp/lb
DS X E-Tense	2018	1,000 kW (1,300 hp)	2,000 kg (4,400 lb)	507 W/kg / 0.31 hp/lb
Ferrari FXX	2005	588 kW (789 hp)	1,155 kg (2,546 lb)	509 W/kg / 0.31 hp/lb
Koenigsegg CCR	2004	601 kW (806 hp)	1,180 kg (2,600 lb)	509 W/kg / 0.31 hp/lb
Radical SR9 LMP2	2006	395 kW (530 hp)	775 kg (1,709 lb)	510 W/kg / 0.31 hp/lb
BUB Seven Streamliner land speed record streamlined motorcycle	2006	373 kW (500 hp)	730 kg (1,610 lb)	514 W/kg / 0.31 hp/lb
Suzuki Hayabusa	2007	128.4 kW (172.2 hp)	250 kg (550 lb)	514 W/kg / 0.31 hp/lb
Naran Naran	2021	781 kW (1,047 hp)	1,500 kg (3,300 lb)	514 W/kg / 0.31 hp/lb
Acura ARX-02a Le Mans Prototype	2009	466 kW (625 hp)	900 kg (2,000 lb)	518 W/kg / 0.31 hp/lb
Hyundai i20 AP4++	-	596.5 kW (799.9 hp)	1,150 kg (2,540 lb)	519 W/kg / 0.31 hp/lb
Tramontana XTR	2013	662 kW (888 hp)	1,268 kg (2,795 lb)	522 W/kg / 0.32 hp/lb
Tesla Roadster	2023	1,044 kW (1,400 hp)	2,000 kg (4,400 lb)	522 W/kg / 0.32 hp/lb
Gordon Murray Automotive T.50	2022	488 kW (654 hp)	986 kg (2,174 lb)	522 W/kg / 0.32 hp/lb
Radical RXC Turbo 500R	2016	522 kW (700 hp)	1,000 kg (2,200 lb)	522 W/kg / 0.32 hp/lb
Polaris Industries Assault Snowmobile	2009	115 kW (154 hp)	221 kg (487 lb)	523 W/kg / 0.32 hp/lb
Praga Bohema	2023	515 kW (691 hp)	982 kg (2,165 lb)	524 W/kg / 0.32 hp/lb
Pescarolo 01 Le Mans Prototype	2007	485 kW (650 hp)	925 kg (2,039 lb)	524 W/kg / 0.32 hp/lb
Ford Mustang Mach-E 1400	2020	1,044 kW (1,400 hp)	1,993 kg (4,394 lb)	524 W/kg / 0.32 hp/lb
Audi R10 TDI Le Mans Prototype	2006	485 kW (650 hp)	925 kg (2,039 lb)	524 W/kg / 0.32 hp/lb
Ginetta-Zytek GZ09S Le Mans Prototype	2009	473.5 W/kg / 635 hp	900 kg (2,000 lb)	526 W/kg / 0.32 hp/lb
Cadillac Northstar LMP Le Mans Prototype	2001/2002	485 kW (650 hp)	916 kg (2,019 lb)	529 W/kg / 0.32 hp/lb
Kawasaki Ninja ZX-14	2012	143 kW (192 hp)	269 kg (593 lb)	532 W/kg / 0.32 hp/lb
Porsche Mission R	2021	800 kW (1,100 hp)	1,500 kg (3,300 lb)	533 W/kg / 0.32 hp/lb
McLaren P1 LM	2016	735 kW (986 hp)	1,380 kg (3,040 lb)	533 W/kg / 0.32 hp/lb
Porsche RS Spyder Evo	2007	375 kW (503 hp)	775 kg (1,709 lb)	533.5 W/kg / 0.325 hp/lb
Brabham BT62	2018	522 kW (700 hp)	972 kg (2,143 lb)	537 W/kg / 0.33 hp/lb
Dome S102 Le Mans Prototype	2008	485 kW (650 hp)	900 kg (2,000 lb)	538.5 W/kg / 0.33 hp/lb
Bentley Speed 8 Le Mans Prototype	2003	485 kW (650 hp)	900 kg (2,000 lb)	538.5 W/kg / 0.33 hp/lb
Lola-Aston Martin B09/60 Le Mans Prototype	2008	485 kW (650 hp)	900 kg (2,000 lb)	539 W/kg / 0.33 hp/lb
McLaren Speedtail	2020	772 kW (1,035 hp)	1,430 kg (3,150 lb)	540 W/kg / 0.33 hp/lb
Travis Pastrana's Gymkhana Subaru WRX STI	2021	643 kW (862 hp)	1,190 kg (2,620 lb)	540 W/kg / 0.33 hp/lb
MG-Lola EX257 Le Mans Prototype	2002	373 kW (500 hp)	686 kg (1,512 lb)	543.5 W/kg / 0.33 hp/lb
Ferrari FXX Evoluzione	2009	633 kW (849 hp)	1,155 kg (2,546 lb)	547.5 W/kg / 0.33 hp/lb
Dodge Tomahawk	2003	373 kW (500 hp)	680 kg (1,500 lb)	548 W/kg / 0.33 hp/lb
Aria FXE	2019	858 kW (1,151 hp)	1,565 kg (3,450 lb)	548 W/kg / 0.33 hp/lb
Audi R8 Le Mans Prototype	2002	500 kW (670 hp)	909 kg (2,004 lb)	550 W/kg / 0.33 hp/lb
Pagani Zonda Revolución	2012	588 kW (789 hp)	1,070 kg (2,360 lb)	550 W/kg / 0.33 hp/lb
Aston Martin Valhalla	2023	746 kW (1,000 hp)	1,350 kg (2,980 lb)	552 W/kg / 0.34 hp/lb
Bugatti Chiron	2016	1,103 kW (1,479 hp)	1,995 kg (4,398 lb)	553 W/kg / 0.34 hp/lb
Ariel HIPERCAR	2020	880 kW (1,180 hp)	1,587.5 kg (3,500 lb)	554 W/kg / 0.34 hp/lb
Zenvo TSR-S	2018	878 kW (1,177 hp)	1,580 kg (3,480 lb)	555.5 W/kg / 0.34 hp/lb
Bugatti Divo	2019	1,103 kW (1,479 hp)	1,941 kg (4,279 lb)	568 W/kg / 0.34 hp/lb
NIO EP9	2016	1,000 kW (1,300 hp)	1,735 kg (3,825 lb)	576 W/kg / 0.35 hp/lb
Gardner Douglas GD T70 Spyder	2010	522 kW (700 hp)	900 kg (2,000 lb)	580 W/kg / 0.35 hp/lb
Porsche LMP2000 Le Mans Prototype	2000	522 kW (700 hp)	900 kg (2,000 lb)	580 W/kg / 0.35 hp/lb
Lightfighter v2.0 electric motorcycle	2020	105 kW (141 hp)	181 kg (399 lb)	581 W/kg / 0.35 hp/lb
Ultima GTR 720	2006	536.9 kW (720.0 hp)	920 kg (2,030 lb)	583 W/kg / 0.35 hp/lb
Honda CBR954RR	2002	115 kW (154 hp)	195 kg (430 lb)	589 W/kg / 0.36 hp/lb
Swift 017.n Formula Nippon	2009	395 kW (530 hp)	670 kg (1,480 lb)	590 W/kg / 0.36 hp/lb
Dallara T08 World Series Formula V8 3.5	2008	373 kW (500 hp)	628 kg (1,385 lb)	593.5 W/kg / 0.36 hp/lb
Rebellion R13 Le Mans Prototype		496 kW (665 hp)	833 kg (1,836 lb)	595 W/kg / 0.36 hp/lb
Pagani Huayra R	2021	625 kW (838 hp)	1,050 kg (2,310 lb)	595 W/kg / 0.36 hp/lb
Bugatti Centodieci	2020	1,176 kW (1,577 hp)	1,976 kg (4,356 lb)	595.5 W/kg / 0.36 hp/lb
Dallara IL-15 Indy Lights	2015	373 kW (500 hp)	626 kg (1,380 lb)	596 W/kg / 0.36 hp/lb
Iconic GTR Roadster	2009	597 kW (801 hp)	998 kg (2,200 lb)	598 W/kg / 0.36 hp/lb
Dallara SP1 Le Mans Prototype	2001	544 kW (730 hp)	909 kg (2,004 lb)	599 W/kg / 0.36 hp/lb
Aston Martin Valkyrie	2022	865 kW (1,160 hp)	1,435 kg (3,164 lb)	602 W/kg / 0.367 hp/lb
Dallara SF19 Super Formula	2019	405 kW (543 hp)	670 kg (1,480 lb)	604 W/kg / 0.37 hp/lb
Late Model modified stock cars		630 kW (840 hp)	1,043 kg (2,299 lb)	607.5 W/kg / 0.37 hp/lb
Ferrari F50 GT	1996	551 kW (739 hp)	909.4 kg (2,005 lb)	605.89 W/kg / 0.37 hp/lb
Delage D12	2020	828 kW (1,110 hp)	1,361 kg (3,000 lb)	608 W/kg / 0.37 hp/lb
Lotus 38 USAC Indy car		373 kW (500 hp)	612 kg (1,349 lb)	609 W/kg / 0.37 hp/lb
Rimac Nevera	2022	1,408 kW (1,888 hp)	2,300 kg (5,100 lb)	612 W/kg / 0.38 hp/lb
Dallara SF14 Super Formula	2014	405 kW (543 hp)	660 kg (1,460 lb)	613.5 W/kg / 0.37 hp/lb
MV Agusta F3 800 RC	2021	114 kW (153 hp)	184 kg (406 lb)	621 W/kg / 0.38 hp/lb
Williams JPH1 FIA Formula Two Championship	2010	358 kW (480 hp)	570 kg (1,260 lb)	628 W/kg / 0.38 hp/lb
Gordon Murray Automotive T.50s Niki Lauda	2022	541 kW (725 hp)	852 kg (1,878 lb)	635 W/kg / 0.39 hp/lb
Pininfarina Battista	2022	1,408 kW (1,888 hp)	2,200 kg (4,900 lb)	636 W/kg / 0.39 hp/lb
Coloni Motorsport FA1 x 2-seater	2017	410 kW (550 hp)	640 kg (1,410 lb)	641 W/kg / 0.39 hp/lb
Dallara T12 World Series Formula V8 3.5	2012	395 kW (530 hp)	616 kg (1,358 lb)	642 W/kg / 0.39 hp/lb
Dallara F2 2018 Formula 2	2018	462 kW (620 hp)	720 kg (1,590 lb)	642 W/kg / 0.39 hp/lb
Leblanc Mirabeau	2005	522 kW (700 hp)	812 kg (1,790 lb)	643 W/kg / 0.39 hp/lb
Honda Mean Mower v2.0	2018	142 kW (190 hp)	219 kg (483 lb)	647 W/kg / 0.39 hp/lb
Falcon F7 Twin Turbo	2021	820 kW (1,100 hp)	1,263 kg (2,784 lb)	649 W/kg / 0.39 hp/lb
Ferrari FXX-K	2015	772 kW (1,035 hp)	1,165 kg (2,568 lb)	663 W/kg / 0.40 hp/lb
Dallara GP2/11 GP2 Series	2011	456 kW (612 hp)	688 kg (1,517 lb)	663 W/kg / 0.40 hp/lb
Lola B05/52 A1 Grand Prix	2005	410 kW (550 hp)	615 kg (1,356 lb)	667 W/kg / 0.40 hp/lb
Lightning LS-218 electric motorcycle	2014	150 kW (200 hp)	225 kg (496 lb)	667 W/kg / 0.40 hp/lb
Honda CBR1000RR	2009	133 kW (178 hp)	199 kg (439 lb)	668 W/kg / 0.40 hp/lb
Dallara GP2/08 GP2 Series	2008	462 kW (620 hp)	688 kg (1,517 lb)	671.5 W/kg / 0.41 hp/lb
Toyota GR010 Hybrid Le Mans Hypercar sports prototype	2021	700 kW (940 hp)	1,040 kg (2,290 lb)	673 W/kg / 0.41 hp/lb
Kawasaki Ninja ZX-12R	2000	140 kW (190 hp)	210 kg (460 lb)	675 W/kg / 0.41 hp/lb
Ariel Atom 500 V8	2011	372 kW (499 hp)	550 kg (1,210 lb)	676.3 W/kg / 0.41 hp/lb
Suzuki GSX-R1000	2017	138 kW (185 hp)	202 kg (445 lb)	683 W/kg / 0.41 hp/lb
G-Force GF09 IndyCar	2003	485 kW (650 hp)	710 kg (1,570 lb)	683 W/kg / 0.41 hp/lb
MV Agusta F4 1000 Senna	2006	129.75 kW (174.00 hp)	190 kg (420 lb)	683 W/kg / 0.41 hp/lb
Koenigsegg Gemera	2024	1,268 kW (1,700 hp)	1,850 kg (4,080 lb)	685 W/kg / 0.42 hp/lb
Miss GEICO Mystic #113 offshore powerboat	2006	3,132 kW (4,200 hp)	4,536 kg (10,000 lb)	690.5 W/kg / 0.42 hp/lb
BMW S1000RR	2009	144 kW (193 hp)	207.7 kg (458 lb)	693.3 W/kg / 0.42 hp/lb
RAESR Tachyon Speed	2019	932 kW (1,250 hp)	1,338 kg (2,950 lb)	697 W/kg / 0.42 hp/lb
Lotec Sirius	2000	895 kW (1,200 hp)	1,280 kg (2,820 lb)	699 W/kg / 0.42 hp/lb
Bugatti Vision Gran Turismo Sport	2015	1,214 kW (1,628 hp)	1,724 kg (3,801 lb)	704 W/kg / 0.43 hp/lb
Lola B02/50 Formula 3000	2002	388 kW (520 hp)	545 kg (1,202 lb)	711 W/kg / 0.43 hp/lb
Kawasaki Ninja ZX-10R	2016	147 kW (197 hp)	206 kg (454 lb)	713 W/kg / 0.43 hp/lb
Weber F1	2013	895 kW (1,200 hp)	1,250 kg (2,760 lb)	716 W/kg / 0.435 hp/lb
Dallara IR-03 IndyCar	2003	522 kW (700 hp)	726 kg (1,601 lb)	719 W/kg / 0.44 hp/lb
Aprilia RSV4	2009	150 kW (200 hp)	208 kg (459 lb)	721 W/kg / 0.44 hp/lb
A1 Grand Prix car	2008	450 kW (600 hp)	615 kg (1,356 lb)	727.5 W/kg / 0.44 hp/lb
Midget cars		298 kW (400 hp)	410 kg (900 lb)	731 W/kg / 0.44 hp/lb
Lotus T125	2010	477 kW (640 hp)	650 kg (1,430 lb)	734 W/kg / 0.45 hp/lb
Lamborghini V12 Vision Gran Turismo	2019	602 kW (807 hp)	819 kg (1,806 lb)	735 W/kg / 0.45 hp/lb
Koenigsegg One:1	2015	1,000 kW (1,300 hp)	1,360 kg (3,000 lb)	735 W/kg / 0.45 hp/lb
Mansory Carbonado GT	2014	1,176 kW (1,577 hp)	1,622 kg (3,576 lb)	736 W/kg / 0.45 hp/lb
Boba Motoring Volkswagen Golf Mk2		919.5 kW (1,233.1 hp)	1,240 kg (2,730 lb)	741.5 W/kg / 0.45 hp/lb
Peugeot 208 T16 Pikes Peak	2013	652 kW (874 hp)	875 kg (1,929 lb)	745 W/kg / 0.45 hp/lb
Quantum GP700	2016	522 kW (700 hp)	700 kg (1,500 lb)	746 W/kg / 0.45 hp/lb
RCCO eX ZERO	2021	746 kW (1,000 hp)	1,000 kg (2,200 lb)	746 W/kg / 0.45 hp/lb
Czinger 21C	2023	932 kW (1,250 hp)	1,250 kg (2,760 lb)	746 W/kg / 0.45 hp/lb
Saleen S7 Le Mans	2017	969 kW (1,299 hp)	1,300 kg (2,900 lb)	746 W/kg / 0.45 hp/lb
Panoz DP09 Superleague Formula	2008	559 kW (750 hp)	748 kg (1,649 lb)	747 W/kg / 0.45 hp/lb
SSC Ultimate Aero XT	2013	969 kW (1,299 hp)	1,270 kg (2,800 lb)	763 W/kg / 0.46 hp/lb
Vanda Dendrobium D-1	2019	1,342 kW (1,800 hp)	1,750 kg (3,860 lb)	767 W/kg / 0.47 hp/lb
Dallara DW12-Honda IndyCar	2018	559 kW (750 hp)	721 kg (1,590 lb)	775 W/kg / 0.47 hp/lb
RUF 9ff GT9 Vmax	2007	1,030 kW (1,380 hp)	1,326 kg (2,923 lb)	777 W/kg / 0.47 hp/lb
Aspark Owl	2020	1,480 kW (1,980 hp)	1,900 kg (4,200 lb)	779 W/kg / 0.47 hp/lb
Honda CBR1000RR-R Fireblade SP	2021	160 kW (210 hp)	201 kg (443 lb)	798 W/kg / 0.485 hp/lb
Ducati 1098R	2008	134 kW (180 hp)	165 kg (364 lb)	813 W/kg / 0.49 hp/lb
Ducati Desmosedici RR	2008	149 kW (200 hp)	180 kg (400 lb)	822 W/kg / 0.50 hp/lb
Triumph Rocket land speed record streamliner motorcycle	2013	750 kW (1,010 hp)	907 kg (2,000 lb)	822 W/kg / 0.50 hp/lb
Glickenhaus 007S	2021	1,044 kW (1,400 hp)	1,270 kg (2,800 lb)	822 W/kg / 0.50 hp/lb
Toyota TS050 Hybrid	2016	735 kW (986 hp)	868 kg (1,914 lb)	837 W/kg / 0.51 hp/lb
Koenigsegg Jesko	2020	1,195 kW (1,603 hp)	1,420 kg (3,130 lb)	841.5 W/kg / 0.51 hp/lb
Chris Rado's Scion TC	2010	1,044 kW (1,400 hp)	1,225 kg (2,701 lb)	852 W/kg / 0.52 hp/lb
Elation Freedom	2022	1,419 kW (1,903 hp)	1,650 kg (3,640 lb)	859.5 W/kg / 0.52 hp/lb
Hennessey Venom GT Spyder	2016	1,082 kW (1,451 hp)	1,258 kg (2,773 lb)	860 W/kg / 0.52 hp/lb
Saleen S7 LM	2019	1,118.5 kW (1,499.9 hp)	1,300 kg (2,900 lb)	861 W/kg / 0.52 hp/lb
Wolf GB08 TSC-Honda Pikes Peak	2018	450 kW (600 hp)	518 kg (1,142 lb)	864 W/kg / 0.52 hp/lb
Red Bull RB9 Formula One	2013	560 kW (750 hp)	642 kg (1,415 lb)	872 W/kg / 0.53 hp/lb
McLaren MP4-26 Formula One	2011	560 kW (750 hp)	640 kg (1,410 lb)	874 W/kg / 0.53 hp/lb
Lotus Evija	2021	1,470 kW (1,970 hp)	1,680 kg (3,700 lb)	875 W/kg / 0.53 hp/lb
Sierra Alpha Crosskart	-	448 kW (601 hp)	499 kg (1,100 lb)	897 W/kg / 0.54 hp/lb
Weineck Cobra 780cui		890 kW (1,190 hp)	989 kg (2,180 lb)	905 W/kg / 0.55 hp/lb
MV Agusta F4 Claudio	2018	158 kW (212 hp)	174.5 kg (385 lb)	906 W/kg / 0.55 hp/lb
Caparo T1	2006	429 kW (575 hp)	470 kg (1,040 lb)	912 W/kg / 0.55 hp/lb
Ducati 1199 Panigale R (WSB)	2012	151 kW (202 hp)	165 kg (364 lb)	915 W/kg / 0.56 hp/lb
Mercedes F1 W05 Hybrid Formula One	2014	630 kW (840 hp)	691 kg (1,523 lb)	917 W/kg / 0.56 hp/lb
Dodson Motorsport Nissan GT-R hillclimb	-	1,193 kW (1,600 hp)	1,300 kg (2,900 lb)	918 W/kg / 0.56 hp/lb
Vector WX-8	2008	1,379.5 kW (1,849.9 hp)	1,500 kg (3,300 lb)	920 W/kg / 0.56 hp/lb
KillaCycle Drag racing electric motorcycle		260 kW (350 hp)	281 kg (619 lb)	925 W/kg / 0.56 hp/lb
BMW Sauber F1.06 Formula One	2006	567 kW (760 hp)	600 kg (1,300 lb)	944.5 W/kg / 0.57 hp/lb
Fahlke Larea GT1 S12	2014	940 kW (1,260 hp)	980 kg (2,160 lb)	959 W/kg / 0.58 hp/lb
Ultima RS	2020	895 kW (1,200 hp)	921 kg (2,030 lb)	972 W/kg / 0.59 hp/lb
Ferrari 248 F1 Formula One	2006	585 kW (784 hp)	600 kg (1,300 lb)	975 W/kg / 0.59 hp/lb
Hennessey Venom F5	2021	1,355 kW (1,817 hp)	1,385 kg (3,053 lb)	978 W/kg / 0.59 hp/lb
Vyrus 987 C3 4V V supercharged motorcycle	2010	157.3 kW (210.9 hp)	158 kg (348 lb)	996 W/kg / 0.60 hp/lb
McLaren MP4-22 Formula One	2007	604 kW (810 hp)	605 kg (1,334 lb)	998 W/kg / 0.61 hp/lb
Jaguar Vision Gran Turismo SV	2020	1,400 kW (1,900 hp)	1,400 kg (3,100 lb)	1000 W/kg / 0.61 hp/lb
Panoz DP01 Champ Car	2007	708 kW (949 hp)	703 kg (1,550 lb)	1008 W/kg / 0.61 hp/lb
Twin-turbocharged Twin-engine Volkswagen Golf Mk3		1,193 kW (1,600 hp)	1,180 kg (2,600 lb)	1011 W/kg / 0.615 hp/lb
Ferrari F1-2000 Formula One	2000	608 kW (815 hp)	600 kg (1,300 lb)	1013 W/kg / 0.62 hp/lb
Estrema Fulminea	2021	1,521 kW (2,040 hp)	1,500 kg (3,300 lb)	1014 W/kg / 0.62 hp/lb
TOP 1 Ack Attack land speed record streamlined motorcycle	2010	750 kW (1,010 hp)	733 kg (1,616 lb)	1017 W/kg / 0.62 hp/lb
Porsche 919 EVO	2018	865 kW (1,160 hp)	849 kg (1,872 lb)	1019 W/kg / 0.62 hp/lb
Mercedes-AMG F1 EQ Power+ Formula One	2017	746 kW (1,000 hp)	728 kg (1,605 lb)	1024 W/kg / 0.62 hp/lb
Funco Motorsports F-9 sandrail		1,305 kW (1,750 hp)	1,270 kg (2,800 lb)	1027.5 W/kg / 0.625 hp/lb
Jason Joren's Corvette C6	2005	1,491 kW (1,999 hp)	1,451.5 kg (3,200 lb)	1027.5 W/kg / 0.625 hp/lb
Mercedes W12 Formula One	2021	780 kW (1,050 hp)	752 kg (1,658 lb)	1041 W/kg / 0.63 hp/lb
Sprint cars		670 kW (900 hp)	640 kg (1,410 lb)	1046 W/kg / 0.64 hp/lb
SSC Tuatara	2020	1,305 kW (1,750 hp)	1,247 kg (2,749 lb)	1046.5 W/kg / 0.64 hp/lb
Kawasaki Ninja H2R	2015	230 kW (310 hp)	216 kg (476 lb)	1065 W/kg / 0.65 hp/lb
Ferrari F2004 Formula One	2004	645 kW (865 hp)	605 kg (1,334 lb)	1066 W/kg / 0.65 hp/lb
Speed Demon land speed record car	2010	2,353 kW (3,155 hp)	2,159 kg (4,760 lb)	1090 W/kg / 0.66 hp/lb
Bugatti Bolide	2021	1,361 kW (1,825 hp)	1,240 kg (2,730 lb)	1097.5 W/kg / 0.67 hp/lb
Renault R25 Formula One	2005	671 kW / 900 hp	600 kg (1,300 lb)	1118.5 W/kg / 0.68 hp/lb
Suzuki GSV-R	2002	165.5 kW (221.9 hp)	150 kg (330 lb)	1121 W/kg / 0.68 hp/lb
Suzuki GSX-RR	2016	177 kW (237 hp)	157 kg (346 lb)	1127 W/kg / 0.69 hp/lb
Ducati Superleggera V-4	2020	174.5 kW (234.0 hp)	152.2 kg (336 lb)	1146.5 W/kg / 0.70 hp/lb
Suzuki RGV500 Grand Prix motorcycle	2001	149 kW (200 hp)	130 kg (290 lb)	1147 W/kg / 0.70 hp/lb
Yamaha YZR-M1	2002	183 kW (245 hp)	157 kg (346 lb)	1165.6 W/kg / 0.71 hp/lb
Williams FW25 Formula One	2003	701 kW (940 hp)	600 kg (1,300 lb)	1168 W/kg / 0.71 hp/lb
BMW Williams FW27 Formula One	2005	713 kW (956 hp)	600 kg (1,300 lb)	1181 W/kg / 0.72 hp/lb
Ducati Desmosedici MotoGP	2021	186 kW (249 hp)	157 kg (346 lb)	1188 W/kg / 0.72 hp/lb
BAR 007	2005	746 kW (1,000 hp)	605 kg (1,334 lb)	1189 W/kg / 0.72 hp/lb
Honda RC211V MotoGP	2004	176.73 kW (237.00 hp)	148 kg (326 lb)	1194 W/kg / 0.73 hp/lb
Corbellati Missile	2019	1,342 kW (1,800 hp)	1,100 kg (2,400 lb)	1220 W/kg / 0.74 hp/lb
Aprilia RS Cube	2002	168 kW (225 hp)	135 kg (298 lb)	1243 W/kg / 0.755 hp/lb
KTM RC16	2020	198 kW (266 hp)	157 kg (346 lb)	1259 W/kg / 0.77 hp/lb
Borowski Race Engines LSX-powered Chevrolet Camaro	1967	2,043 kW (2,740 hp)	1,587.5 kg (3,500 lb)	1287 W/kg / 0.78 hp/lb
Arash AF10	2016	1,551 kW (2,080 hp)	1,200 kg (2,600 lb)	1293 W/kg / 0.79 hp/lb
Scott Cooper's Honda CBR1000-powered drag kart	-	336 kW (451 hp)	250 kg (550 lb)	1342 W/kg / 0.82 hp/lb
MTT Street Fighter	2006	313 kW (420 hp)	227 kg (500 lb)	1381 W/kg / 0.84 hp/lb
Ford GT 300 MPH		2,237 kW (3,000 hp)	1,581 kg (3,486 lb)	1415 W/kg / 0.86 hp/lb
Alpha Logic's Nissan GT-R	2013	2,535 kW (3,399 hp)	1,587.5 kg (3,500 lb)	1597 W/kg / 0.97 hp/lb
Devel Sixteen		3,734 kW (5,007 hp)	2,300 kg (5,100 lb)	1623 W/kg / 0.99 hp/lb
Rapom V8 motorcycle	2007	746 kW (1,000 hp)	454 kg (1,001 lb)	1644 W/kg / 1.0 hp/lb
Mosler MT900 GT-R XX Twin-Turbo 'Land Shark'	2009	1,864 kW (2,500 hp)	861 kg (1,898 lb)	2165 W/kg / 1.32 hp/lb
NHRA C6 Corvette	-	2,983 kW (4,000 hp)	1,270 kg (2,800 lb)	2348.5 W/kg / 1.43 hp/lb
Drag bike V-twin nitromethane		1,491.4 kW (2,000.0 hp)	454 kg (1,001 lb)	3288 W/kg / 2.0 hp/lb
John Force Racing Funny Car NHRA Drag Racing	2008	5,965.5 kW (7,999.9 hp)	1,043 kg (2,299 lb)	5717 W/kg / 3.50 hp/lb
FireForce 5 jet dragster		3,372 kW (4,522 hp)	544 kg (1,199 lb)	6195 W/kg / 3.77 hp/lb
Top Fuel dragster		8,203 kW (11,000 hp)	1,057 kg (2,330 lb)	7761 W/kg / 4.72 hp/lb

==== Vehicles in order of power to weight ratio ====
Vehicle	Year	Power	Vehicle weight	Power-to-weight ratio
Benz Patent Motorwagen 954 cc	1886	560 W (0.75 hp)	265 kg (584 lb)	2.1 W/kg / 0.0013 hp/lb
Panzerkampfwagen VIII Maus V.2	1944	895 kW (1,200 hp)	188,000 kg (414,000 lb)	4.8 W/kg / 0.0029 hp/lb
Force Motors Minidor Diesel 499 cc auto rickshaw		6.6 kW (8.9 hp)	700 kg (1,500 lb)	9 W/kg / 0.0054 hp/lb
TGV BR Class 373 high-speed Eurostar Trainset	1993	12,240 kW (16,410 hp)	816 t / 1,798,972 lb	15 W/kg / 0.0091 hp/lb
Mercedes-Benz Unimog 1500	1975	110 kW (150 hp)	5,940 kg (13,100 lb)	19 W/kg / 0.011 hp/lb
Fiat 500	1957	10 kW (13 hp)	499 kg (1,100 lb)	19.4 W/kg / 0.011 hp/lb
General Dynamics M1 Abrams Main battle tank	1980	1,119 kW (1,501 hp)	55.7 t / 122,800 lb	20.1 W/kg / 0.012 hp/lb
Peel Trident	1965	3.1 kW (4.2 hp)	150 kg (330 lb)	21 W/kg / 0.013 hp/lb
BMW Isetta	1955	10 kW (13 hp)	417 kg (919 lb)	23.2 W/kg / 0.014 hp/lb
Ford Model T 2.9 L flex-fuel	1908	15 kW (20 hp)	540 kg (1,190 lb)	28 W/kg / 0.017 hp/lb
Messerschmitt KR200 Kabinenroller 191 cc	1955	6 kW (8.0 hp)	230 kg (510 lb)	30 W/kg / 0.018 hp/lb
Wright Flyer	1903	9 kW (12 hp)	274 kg (604 lb)	33 W/kg / 0.02 hp/lb
Citroën 2CV	1948-1990	22 kW (30 hp)	600 kg (1,300 lb)	36 W/kg / 0.022 hp/lb
Hildebrand & Wolfmüller motorcycle	1894	1.9 kW (2.5 hp)	50 kg (110 lb)	37 W/kg / 0.022 hp/lb
Volkswagen Beetle	1963	30 kW (40 hp)	798 kg (1,759 lb)	37.4 W/kg / 0.022 hp/lb
Volkswagen Type 2	1967	40 kW (54 hp)	1,048 kg (2,310 lb)	38.4 W/kg / 0.023 hp/lb
Willys Jeep	1941	45 kW (60 hp)	1,113 kg (2,454 lb)	40.3 W/kg / 0.0245 hp/lb
Suzuki MightyBoy 543 cc	1988	23 kW (31 hp)	550 kg (1,210 lb)	42 W/kg / 0.025 hp/lb
Bond Minicar	1949	6 kW (8.0 hp)	140 kg (310 lb)	42.4 W/kg / 0.026 hp/lb
Holden FJ 2,160 cc	1953	44.7 kW (59.9 hp)	1,021 kg (2,251 lb)	43.8 W/kg / 0.026 hp/lb
Phantom Corsair	1938	93 kW (125 hp)	2,070 kg (4,560 lb)	45 W/kg / 0.027 hp/lb
Morris Minor	1962	36 kW (48 hp)	775 kg (1,709 lb)	46 W/kg / 0.028 hp/lb
DOE/NASA/0032-28 Chevrolet Celebrity 502 cc ASE Mod II	1985	62.3 kW (83.5 hp)	1,297 kg (2,859 lb)	48 W/kg / 0.029 hp/lb
Land Rover Defender 2.4	1990	90 kW (120 hp)	1,837 kg (4,050 lb)	49 W/kg / 0.03 hp/lb
Mercury Eight	1949	82 kW (110 hp)	1,531 kg (3,375 lb)	54 W/kg / 0.03 hp/lb
Peel P50 50 cc single-cylinder	1962	3.1 kW (4.2 hp)	56 kg (123 lb)	56 W/kg / 0.03 hp/lb
U.S. Army HMMWV LUV	1983	142 kW (190 hp)	2,359 kg (5,201 lb)	60 W/kg / 0.036 hp/lb
Suzuki Cappuccino	1991	47 kW (63 hp)	725 kg (1,598 lb)	65 W/kg / 0.039 hp/lb
Reliant Robin	1973	29 kW (39 hp)	450 kg (990 lb)	64.6 W/kg / 0.04 hp/lb
Bentley 8-Litre	1930	160 kW (210 hp)	2,500 kg (5,500 lb)	66 W/kg / 0.04 hp/lb
Bugatti Royale	1927	224 kW (300 hp)	3,175 kg (7,000 lb)	70.5 W/kg / 0.04 hp/lb
DeLorean DMC-12	1981	97 kW (130 hp)	1,233 kg (2,718 lb)	79 W/kg / 0.05 hp/lb
Reliant Scimitar GT SE4	1964	89.5 kW (120.0 hp)	1,080 kg (2,380 lb)	83 W/kg / 0.05 hp/lb
Bowler Wildcat	1998	163 kW (219 hp)	1,825 kg (4,023 lb)	89 W/kg / 0.054 hp/lb
Bandolero US Legend Cars		22 kW (30 hp)	249.5 kg (550 lb)	90 W/kg / 0.054 hp/lb
Fast Five "Mongo" Heist Truck	-	373 kW (500 hp)	4,082 kg (8,999 lb)	91 W/kg / 0.055 hp/lb
Suzuki LT-125D QuadRunner	1982	8.3 kW (11.1 hp)	87 kg (192 lb)	95 W/kg / 0.06 hp/lb
Hudson Hornet	1954	157 kW (211 hp)	1,610 kg (3,550 lb)	97 W/kg / 0.06 hp/lb
Reliant Sabre Six	1962	81 kW (109 hp)	816 kg (1,799 lb)	99.6 W/kg / 0.06 hp/lb
"Blower" Bentley	1929	180 kW (240 hp)	1,625 kg (3,583 lb)	111 W/kg / 0.07 hp/lb
Cadillac Eldorado	1959	257 kW (345 hp)	2,295 kg (5,060 lb)	112 W/kg / 0.07 hp/lb
Meyers Manx dune buggy	1965	67 kW (90 hp)	576 kg (1,270 lb)	118 W/kg / 0.07 hp/lb
Honda RC110 50cc Grand Prix motorcycle	1962	7.1 kW (9.5 hp)	60 kg (130 lb)	120 W/kg / 0.07 hp/lb
Chevrolet Bel Air	1957	208 kW (279 hp)	1,587.5 kg (3,500 lb)	133 W/kg / 0.08 hp/lb
Lotus Elan Sprint	1970	94 kW (126 hp)	680 kg (1,500 lb)	138 W/kg / 0.084 hp/lb
Ford Thunderbird	1959	261 kW (350 hp)	1,795 kg (3,957 lb)	145 W/kg / 0.09 hp/lb
Suzuki RE5 wankel engine motorcycle	1974	46.2 kW (62.0 hp)	230 kg (510 lb)	201 W/kg / 0.12 hp/lb
Toyota Previa S/C	1994	118 kW (158 hp)	1,703 kg (3,754 lb)	69 W/kg / 0.04 hp/lb
General Motors EV1 electric car Gen II	1998	102.2 kW (137.1 hp)	1,400 kg (3,100 lb)	73 W/kg / 0.04 hp/lb
Mini (classic) 1275GT	1969	57 kW (76 hp)	686 kg (1,512 lb)	83 W/kg / 0.05 hp/lb
Ford Windstar	1996	149 kW (200 hp)	1,724 kg (3,801 lb)	86.5 W/kg / 0.05 hp/lb
Toyota Sienna	1998	157 kW (211 hp)	1,802 kg (3,973 lb)	87 W/kg / 0.05 hp/lb
Chevrolet Suburban 5.7 L V8	1998	190 kW (250 hp)	2,189 kg (4,826 lb)	87 W/kg / 0.05 hp/lb
Chevrolet/Geo Prizm	1992	97 kW (130 hp)	1,104.5 kg (2,435 lb)	87.8 W/kg / 0.05 hp/lb
Chevrolet C/K 3500	1998	216 kW (290 hp)	2,194.5 kg (4,838 lb)	98.5 W/kg / 0.06 hp/lb
Toyota Tacoma TRD 3.4 L V6	1996	189 kW (253 hp)	1,161 kg (2,560 lb)	163 W/kg / 0.1 hp/lb
Purvis Eureka	1974	52 kW (70 hp)	700 kg (1,500 lb)	74.5 W/kg / 0.045 hp/lb
Datsun 510	1969	81 kW (109 hp)	965 kg (2,127 lb)	84 W/kg / 0.051 hp/lb
Triumph TR8	1981	110 kW (150 hp)	1,204 kg (2,654 lb)	92 W/kg / 0.055 hp/lb
Triumph TR6	1968	110 kW (150 hp)	1,130 kg (2,490 lb)	99 W/kg / 0.06 hp/lb
Mazda MX-5 Miata	1996	99 kW (133 hp)	960 kg (2,120 lb)	103 W/kg / 0.063 hp/lb
Honda CR-X del Sol	1992	125 kW (168 hp)	1,041 kg (2,295 lb)	120 W/kg / 0.073 hp/lb
Lotus Elite SE	1960	63 kW (84 hp)	503.5 kg (1,110 lb)	126 W/kg / 0.076 hp/lb
Lamborghini Jalpa	1981	190 kW (250 hp)	1,510 kg (3,330 lb)	126 W/kg / 0.077 hp/lb
Honda S2000 roadster	1999	183.88 kW (246.59 bhp)	1,250 kg (2,760 lb)	150 W/kg / 0.09 hp/lb
Toyota MR2	1994	180 kW (240 hp)	1,205 kg (2,657 lb)	150 W/kg / 0.09 hp/lb
Lamborghini Urraco P300	1974	195 kW (261 hp)	1,280 kg (2,820 lb)	152 W/kg / 0.092 hp/lb
Lamborghini Silhouette	1976	198 kW (266 hp)	1,240 kg (2,730 lb)	159 W/kg / 0.097 hp/lb
Lamborghini Espada	1970	261 kW (350 hp)	1,630 kg (3,590 lb)	160 W/kg / 0.10 hp/lb
Nissan Skyline 2000GT-R	1969	119 kW (160 hp)	1,100 kg (2,400 lb)	108.5 W/kg / 0.065 hp/lb
Jaguar XK120 SE	1951	157 kW (211 hp)	1,368 kg (3,016 lb)	114.5 W/kg / 0.07 hp/lb
Porsche 356 B/2000GS Carrera 2	1962	96.9 kW (129.9 hp)	825 kg (1,819 lb)	117.5 W/kg / 0.07 hp/lb
Mercedes-Benz 300 SL Coupe	1954	180 kW (240 hp)	1,500 kg (3,300 lb)	120 W/kg / 0.07 hp/lb
Bugatti Type 35C grand prix	1926	95 kW (127 hp)	750 kg (1,650 lb)	127 W/kg / 0.08 hp/lb
BMW 3.0 CSL	1973	152 kW (204 hp)	1,165 kg (2,568 lb)	130 W/kg / 0.08 hp/lb
Chevrolet Camaro Z-28	1991	183 kW (245 hp)	1,400 kg (3,100 lb)	130.5 W/kg / 0.08 hp/lb
Mercedes-Benz SSK	1928	220 kW (300 hp)	1,700 kg (3,700 lb)	131 W/kg / 0.08 hp/lb
SEAT Formula 1430		46 kW (62 hp)	420 kg (930 lb)	133 W/kg / 0.08 hp/lb
Mitsubishi FTO	1994	147 kW (197 hp)	1,100 kg (2,400 lb)	133.5 W/kg / 0.08 hp/lb
Porsche 911 Carrera RS	1973	154 kW (207 hp)	1,111 kg (2,449 lb)	139 W/kg / 0.08 hp/lb
Toyota Supra	1990	206 kW (276 hp)	1,460 kg (3,220 lb)	141 W/kg / 0.085 hp/lb
Mitsubishi 3000GT VR-4	1994	238.4 kW (319.7 hp)	1,695 kg (3,737 lb)	141 W/kg / 0.09 hp/lb
Nissan Skyline GT-R R32	1989	206 kW (276 hp)	1,430 kg (3,150 lb)	144 W/kg / 0.09 hp/lb
Jaguar XJR-S	1988	245 kW (329 hp)	1,755 kg (3,869 lb)	144 W/kg / 0.09 hp/lb
Nissan 300ZX	1989	224 kW (300 hp)	1,552 kg (3,422 lb)	144 W/kg / 0.09 hp/lb
Pontiac Banshee IV	1988	171.5 kW (230.0 hp)	1,186 kg (2,615 lb)	144.5 W/kg / 0.09 hp/lb
Buick Regal GNX	1987	224 kW (300 hp)	1,608 kg (3,545 lb)	146 W/kg / 0.09 hp/lb
Nissan Skyline GT-R R33	1993	224 kW (300 hp)	1,530 kg (3,370 lb)	147 W/kg / 0.09 hp/lb
Ferrari Dino	1967	132 kW (177 hp)	900 kg (2,000 lb)	147.5 W/kg / 0.09 hp/lb
Renault Alpine A110	1973	104 kW (139 hp)	706 kg (1,556 lb)	148 W/kg / 0.09 hp/lb
Jaguar E-Type	1961	198 kW (266 hp)	1,315 kg (2,899 lb)	150 W/kg / 0.09 hp/lb
Lotus Eleven	1956	62 kW (83 hp)	412 kg (908 lb)	150 W/kg / 0.09 hp/lb
BMW E30 M3 Sport Evolution	1989	175 kW (235 hp)	1,165 kg (2,568 lb)	150 W/kg / 0.09 hp/lb
AMC Rebel "The Machine"	1970	254 kW (341 hp)	1,656 kg (3,651 lb)	153 W/kg / 0.09 hp/lb
Maserati 5000 GT	1959	250 kW (340 hp)	1,652 kg (3,642 lb)	153.5 W/kg / 0.09 hp/lb
Lotus Seven	1973	78 kW (105 hp)	499 kg (1,100 lb)	157 W/kg / 0.095 hp/lb
BMW M1	1978	203.6 kW (273.0 hp)	1,300 kg (2,900 lb)	157 W/kg / 0.095 hp/lb
Ferrari 166MM Barchetta	1948	103 kW (138 hp)	650 kg (1,430 lb)	158 W/kg / 0.10 hp/lb
Nissan Skyline GT-R R34	1999	244 kW (327 hp)	1,540 kg (3,400 lb)	158 W/kg / 0.10 hp/lb
Aston Martin DB5 Vantage	1964	242 kW (325 hp)	1,502 kg (3,311 lb)	161 W/kg / 0.10 hp/lb
Toyota Supra	1993	243 kW (326 hp)	1,490 kg (3,280 lb)	163 W/kg / 0.10 hp/lb
Mercury Cyclone Spoiler II 429 BOSS	1969	280 kW (380 hp)	1,712 kg (3,774 lb)	163 W/kg / 0.10 hp/lb
Chevrolet Impala Super Sport	1967	287 kW (385 hp)	1,739 kg (3,834 lb)	165 W/kg / 0.10 hp/lb
Legend Car US Legend Cars		98 kW (131 hp)	590 kg (1,300 lb)	167 W/kg / 0.10 hp/lb
Acura/Honda NSX-R	1992	206 kW (276 hp)	1,230 kg (2,710 lb)	167 W/kg / 0.10 hp/lb
Chevrolet Corvette Grand Sport	1996	246 kW (330 hp)	1,469 kg (3,239 lb)	167.5 W/kg / 0.10 hp/lb
Mercury Cyclone	1968	291 kW (390 hp)	1,729 kg (3,812 lb)	168 W/kg / 0.10 hp/lb
Chevrolet Impala Super Sport	1966	317 kW (425 hp)	1,867 kg (4,116 lb)	169.75 W/kg / 0.10 hp/lb
Thor24 Detroit Diesel two-stroke V-24 Peterbilt 359 semi-truck	1979	2,553 kW (3,424 hp)	14,968.5 kg (33,000 lb)	170 W/kg / 0.10 hp/lb
Lotus Esprit	1978	157 kW (211 hp)	900 kg (2,000 lb)	174 W/kg / 0.10 hp/lb
Porsche 914/6 GT	1970	157 kW (211 hp)	898 kg (1,980 lb)	174 W/kg / 0.11 hp/lb
De Tomaso Pantera GT5-S	1988	257 kW (345 hp)	1,474 kg (3,250 lb)	174.5 W/kg / 0.11 hp/lb
Honda RC143 125cc Grand Prix motorcycle	1960	17 kW (23 hp)	98 kg (216 lb)	175 W/kg / 0.11 hp/lb
De Tomaso Mangusta	1967	227 kW (304 hp)	1,300 kg (2,900 lb)	175 W/kg / 0.11 hp/lb
Oldsmobile Hurst/Olds 442	1968	291 kW (390 hp)	1,650 kg (3,640 lb)	176 W/kg / 0.11 hp/lb
Aussie Racing Cars silhouette race car		93 kW (125 hp)	515 kg (1,135 lb)	181 W/kg / 0.11 hp/lb
Subaru Impreza WRC	1997-2008	224 kW (300 hp)	1,230 kg (2,710 lb)	182 W/kg / 0.11 hp/lb
Plymouth Road Runner Superbird	1970	317 kW (425 hp)	1,742 kg (3,840 lb)	182 W/kg / 0.11 hp/lb
Mercury Cougar	1967	250 kW (340 hp)	1,365 kg (3,009 lb)	183 W/kg / 0.11 hp/lb
Ferrari 250 California	1957	195 kW (261 hp)	1,050 kg (2,310 lb)	186 W/kg / 0.11 hp/lb
Bugatti EB 112	1993	335 kW (449 hp)	1,800 kg (4,000 lb)	186 W/kg / 0.11 hp/lb
Sunbeam 1000 HP "Slug"	1926	670 kW (900 hp)	3,533 kg (7,789 lb)	190 W/kg / 0.11 hp/lb
Aston Martin DB4 GT Zagato	1961	234 kW (314 hp)	1,225 kg (2,701 lb)	191 W/kg / 0.11 hp/lb
Mercedes-Benz C112	1991	300 kW (400 hp)	1,569 kg (3,459 lb)	191 W/kg / 0.12 hp/lb
Jaguar D-Type	1954	183 kW (245 hp)	953 kg (2,101 lb)	192 W/kg / 0.12 hp/lb
Dodge Challenger R/T	1970	317 kW (425 hp)	1,650 kg (3,640 lb)	192 W/kg / 0.12 hp/lb
Ferrari 456M GT	1998	325 kW (436 hp)	1,690 kg (3,730 lb)	192 W/kg / 0.12 hp/lb
Chevrolet El Camino SS	1970	336 kW (451 hp)	1,742 kg (3,840 lb)	193 W/kg / 0.12 hp/lb
Ferrari Testarossa	1984	291 kW (390 hp)	1,506 kg (3,320 lb)	193 W/kg / 0.12 hp/lb
Dodge Charger R/T	1969	280 kW (380 hp)	1,633 kg (3,600 lb)	194 W/kg / 0.12 hp/lb
Pontiac GTO	1969	276 kW (370 hp)	1,397.5 kg (3,081 lb)	197 W/kg / 0.12 hp/lb
Ford Mustang Boss 429	1969	280 kW (380 hp)	1,416 kg (3,122 lb)	197.5 W/kg / 0.12 hp/lb
Golden Arrow land speed record car	1928	690 kW (930 hp)	3,490 kg (7,690 lb)	198 W/kg / 0.12 hp/lb
Shelby Series 1	1999	239 kW (321 hp)	1,202 kg (2,650 lb)	198.5 W/kg / 0.12 hp/lb
Lamborghini Miura	1966	257 kW (345 hp)	1,292 kg (2,848 lb)	199 W/kg / 0.12 hp/lb
Ford Galaxie 427	1963	317 kW (425 hp)	1,592 kg (3,510 lb)	199 W/kg / 0.12 hp/lb
Dodge Viper	1991	298 kW (400 hp)	1,490 kg (3,280 lb)	200 W/kg / 0.12 hp/lb
Plymouth Barracuda	1970	317 kW (425 hp)	1,540 kg (3,400 lb)	206 W/kg / 0.12 hp/lb
Monster Jam monster trucks		1,118.5 kW (1,499.9 hp)	5,443 kg (12,000 lb)	205.5 W/kg / 0.125 hp/lb
Ferrari F355	1994	280 kW (380 hp)	1,350 kg (2,980 lb)	207 W/kg / 0.13 hp/lb
De Tomaso Guarà	1994	235 kW (315 hp)	1,134 kg (2,500 lb)	208 W/kg / 0.13 hp/lb
Napier-Railton	1933	432.5 kW (580.0 hp)	2,049 kg (4,517 lb)	211 W/kg / 0.13 hp/lb
Chevrolet Corvette (C2) Stingray 427	1967	324 kW (434 hp)	1,525 kg (3,362 lb)	213 W/kg / 0.13 hp/lb
Chevrolet 'COPO' Camaro	1969	321 kW (430 hp)	1,498 kg (3,303 lb)	214 W/kg / 0.13 hp/lb
Ford Fairlane Thunderbolt	1964	317 kW (425 hp)	1,453 kg (3,203 lb)	218 W/kg / 0.13 hp/lb
Thunder Roadster US Legend Cars		149 kW (200 hp)	680 kg (1,500 lb)	219 W/kg / 0.13 hp/lb
Campagna T-Rex	1988	119 kW (160 hp)	544 kg (1,199 lb)	219 W/kg / 0.13 hp/lb
Vector M12	1995	367 kW (492 hp)	1,633 kg (3,600 lb)	225 W/kg / 0.14 hp/lb
Lamborghini Countach LP-5000 QV	1985	339 kW (455 hp)	1,488 kg (3,280 lb)	228 W/kg / 0.14 hp/lb
Chevrolet Corvette Stingray	1970	343 kW (460 hp)	1,496 kg (3,298 lb)	229 W/kg / 0.14 hp/lb
Dirt Modified US Legend Cars		104 kW (139 hp)	454 kg (1,001 lb)	230 W/kg / 0.14 hp/lb
Lamborghini Diablo	1990	362 kW (485 hp)	1,576 kg (3,474 lb)	230 W/kg / 0.14 hp/lb
Porsche 959	1986	335 kW (449 hp)	1,450 kg (3,200 lb)	231 W/kg / 0.14 hp/lb
Ford GT-70	1970	179 kW (240 hp)	765 kg (1,687 lb)	234 W/kg / 0.14 hp/lb
Mercedes-Benz C111	1970	261 kW (350 hp)	1,100 kg (2,400 lb)	237 W/kg / 0.14 hp/lb
Aston Martin DBR1	1956	190 kW (250 hp)	801 kg (1,766 lb)	237.5 W/kg / 0.14 hp/lb
TVR Griffith	1993	254 kW (341 hp)	1,060 kg (2,340 lb)	239 W/kg / 0.145 hp/lb
TVR Chimaera	1992	254 kW (341 hp)	1,060 kg (2,340 lb)	239 W/kg / 0.145 hp/lb
Honda RC116 50cc Grand Prix motorcycle	1966	12 kW (16 hp)	50 kg (110 lb)	239 W/kg / 0.145 hp/lb
Cizeta-Moroder V16T	1989	403 kW (540 hp)	1,678 kg (3,699 lb)	240 W/kg / 0.14 hp/lb
Austin MiniBusa	-	149 kW (200 hp)	620 kg (1,370 lb)	240.5 W/kg / 0.15 hp/lb
Fiat 600/Zastava 750 GSX-R1000 hillclimb	-	149 kW (200 hp)	620 kg (1,370 lb)	240.5 W/kg / 0.15 hp/lb
Bugatti 18/3 Chiron	1999	414 kW (555 hp)	1,700 kg (3,700 lb)	243 W/kg / 0.15 hp/lb
Porsche Taycan Turbo S		560 kW (750 hp)	2,295 kg (5,060 lb)	244 W/kg / 0.15 hp/lb
Mini Proto Hayabusa		142 kW (190 hp)	575 kg (1,268 lb)	246 W/kg / 0.15 hp/lb
Alpine A110 ZX-12R Proto	-	149 kW (200 hp)	600 kg (1,300 lb)	248.5 W/kg / 0.15 hp/lb
Ferrari 288 GTO	1984	294 kW (394 hp)	1,160 kg (2,560 lb)	254 W/kg / 0.15 hp/lb
Dodge Charger SRT Hellcat 6.2 L Hemi V8		527 kW (707 hp)	2,075 kg (4,575 lb)	254 W/kg / 0.15 hp/lb
Ferrari 250 GTO	1962	224 kW (300 hp)	880 kg (1,940 lb)	254.5 W/kg / 0.15 hp/lb
Cooper T51 Formula One	1959	179 kW (240 hp)	701 kg (1,545 lb)	255 W/kg / 0.15 hp/lb
Porsche 911 GT2 (993)	1994	331 kW (444 hp)	1,295 kg (2,855 lb)	256 W/kg / 0.15 hp/lb
Corvette Stingray	1959	235 kW (315 hp)	907 kg (2,000 lb)	259 W/kg / 0.16 hp/lb
Yamaha OX99-11 sports car	1992	300 kW (400 hp)	1,150 kg (2,540 lb)	259 W/kg / 0.16 hp/lb
Aidan Barret's Mazda RX-7 hillclimb	-	246 kW (330 hp)	940 kg (2,070 lb)	262 W/kg / 0.16 hp/lb
Mercedes-Benz 300 SLR	1955	230 kW (310 hp)	880 kg (1,940 lb)	263 W/kg / 0.16 hp/lb
Mercedes-Benz SL65 AMG Black Series	2008	493 kW (661 hp)	1,870 kg (4,120 lb)	264 W/kg / 0.16 hp/lb
Chevrolet Corvette C6 Z06		376 kW (504 hp)	1,421 kg (3,133 lb)	265 W/kg / 0.16 hp/lb
Fiat 600 ZX-12R Proto hillclimb	-	149 kW (200 hp)	550 kg (1,210 lb)	271 W/kg / 0.16 hp/lb
Lamborghini Zagato Raptor	1996	367 kW (492 hp)	1,350 kg (2,980 lb)	272 W/kg / 0.16 hp/lb
BMW 2002 M12/7	-	227 kW (304 hp)	835 kg (1,841 lb)	272 W/kg / 0.16 hp/lb
Ferrari F50	1995	382 kW (512 hp)	1,397 kg (3,080 lb)	273 W/kg / 0.16 hp/lb
Jaguar XJ220	1992	404 kW (542 hp)	1,470 kg (3,240 lb)	275 W/kg / 0.17 hp/lb
Ford Thunderbird NASCAR stock car	1987	460 kW (620 hp)	1,678 kg (3,699 lb)	278 W/kg / 0.17 hp/lb
Shelby Daytona Coupe	1964	291 kW (390 hp)	1,043 kg (2,299 lb)	279 W/kg / 0.17 hp/lb
Ferrari 250 TR	1957	224 kW (300 hp)	800 kg (1,800 lb)	280 W/kg / 0.17 hp/lb
BMW Nazca C2 Spider	1993	280 kW (380 hp)	1,000 kg (2,200 lb)	280 W/kg / 0.17 hp/lb
Ferrari F40	1987	352 kW (472 hp)	1,254 kg (2,765 lb)	281 W/kg / 0.17 hp/lb
Reynard 903 Formula Three	1990	132 kW (177 hp)	470 kg (1,040 lb)	282.5 W/kg / 0.17 hp/lb
Jurgen Halbartschlager's Volkswagen Golf Mk1 hillclimb	-	220 kW (300 hp)	790 kg (1,740 lb)	283 W/kg / 0.17 hp/lb
Honda NSR250R	1987	43 kW (58 hp)	150 kg (330 lb)	284 W/kg / 0.17 hp/lb
Alfa Romeo 33 Stradale	1967	201 kW (270 hp)	700 kg (1,500 lb)	287 W/kg / 0.17 hp/lb
Chevrolet Monte Carlo NASCAR stock car	1987	485 kW (650 hp)	1,678 kg (3,699 lb)	289 W/kg 0.175 hp/lb
Ferrari 512 BB LM	1974	350 kW (470 hp)	1,200 kg (2,600 lb)	292 W/kg / 0.18 hp/lb
Mercedes-Benz W196 Formula One	1954	192 kW (257 hp)	650 kg (1,430 lb)	295 W/kg / 0.18 hp/lb
Ford GT-40 Mk II	1966	362 kW (485 hp)	1,217 kg (2,683 lb)	297 W/kg / 0.18 hp/lb
Honda RC149 125cc Grand Prix motorcycle	1966	25 kW (34 hp)	85 kg (187 lb)	298 W/kg / 0.18 hp/lb
Campbell-Napier-Railton Blue Bird land speed record car	1931	1,081 kW (1,450 hp)	3,607 kg (7,952 lb)	300 W/kg / 0.18 hp/lb
NSU Delphin III land speed record streamliner motorcycle	1956	80.3 kW (107.7 hp)	273 kg (602 lb)	300.5 W/kg / 0.18 hp/lb
Maserati 250F Formula One	1954	201 kW (270 hp)	640 kg (1,410 lb)	300.5 W/kg / 0.18 hp/lb
Ferrari 156 F1	1961	140 kW (190 hp)	460 kg (1,010 lb)	303 W/kg / 0.18 hp/lb
White Triplex land speed record car	1928	1,118.5 kW (1,499.9 hp)	3,629 kg (8,001 lb)	308 W/kg / 0.19 hp/lb
Reinhard Hartel's Alpine A110	-	201 kW (270 hp)	650 kg (1,430 lb)	310 W/kg / 0.19 hp/lb
Maserati Tipo 61 "Birdcage"	1959	186 kW (249 hp)	600 kg (1,300 lb)	311 W/kg / 0.19 hp/lb
Ford Indigo	1996	324 W/kg / 435 hp	1,043 kg (2,299 lb)	311 W/kg / 0.19 hp/lb
Bugatti EB 110	1991	450 kW (600 hp)	1,418 kg (3,126 lb)	317 W/kg / 0.19 hp/lb
Ruf CTR2	1997	433 kW (581 hp)	1,358 kg (2,994 lb)	318.6 W/kg / 0.19 hp/lb
Fiat 500 Proto 4x4 Hayabusa hillclimb	-	186 kW (249 hp)	585 kg (1,290 lb)	319 W/kg / 0.19 hp/lb
Light Car Company Rocket	1991	123 kW (165 hp)	385 kg (849 lb)	319 W/kg / 0.19 hp/lb
Jaguar XJR-15	1990	336 kW (451 hp)	1,050 kg (2,310 lb)	319.5 W/kg / 0.19 hp/lb
Ruf CTR Yellowbird	1987	368 kW (493 hp)	1,150 kg (2,540 lb)	320 W/kg / 0.19 hp/lb
Mercedes-Benz CLK GTR	1998	464 kW (622 hp)	1,440 kg (3,170 lb)	322 W/kg / 0.20 hp/lb
Ducati 888	1991	70 kW (94 hp)	217 kg (478 lb)	323 W/kg / 0.20 hp/lb
Aston Martin DBR4 Formula One	1959	190 kW (250 hp)	575 kg (1,268 lb)	324 W/kg / 0.20 hp/lb
Matra MS7 Formula Two	1967	164 kW (220 hp)	500 kg (1,100 lb)	328 W/kg / 0.20 hp/lb
Bentley Hunaudières	1999	465 kW (624 hp)	1,400 kg (3,100 lb)	332 W/kg / 0.20 hp/lb
Ferrari 158 Formula One	1964	157 kW (211 hp)	468 kg (1,032 lb)	334.5 W/kg / 0.20 hp/lb
Porsche 924 Carrera GTR	1981	313 kW (420 hp)	930 kg (2,050 lb)	337 W/kg / 0.20 hp/lb
Ferrari 156 F1 Formula One	1961	142 kW (190 hp)	420 kg (930 lb)	337 W/kg / 0.20 hp/lb
NASCAR Camping World Truck Series pickup trucks		522 kW (700 hp)	1,542 kg (3,400 lb)	338.5 W/kg / 0.20 hp/lb
Shelby Cobra 427 S/C	1965	362 kW (485 hp)	1,066 kg (2,350 lb)	339 W/kg / 0.20 hp/lb
Stadium Super Truck		447 kW (599 hp)	1,300 kg (2,900 lb)	340 W/kg / 0.21 hp/lb
Lancia D50 Formula One	1955	213 kW (286 hp)	620 kg (1,370 lb)	343 W/kg / 0.21 hp/lb
Maserati Tipo 151	1962	336 kW (451 hp)	973 kg (2,145 lb)	345 W/kg / 0.21 hp/lb
Ferrari 158 Formula One	1964	162 kW (217 hp)	468 kg (1,032 lb)	346 kg / 0.21 hp/lb
Australian V8 Supercars		485 kW (650 hp)	1,395 kg (3,075 lb)	347.5 W/kg / 0.21 hp/lb
Peugeot 205 T16 Pikes Peak	1987	316 kW (424 hp)	907 kg (2,000 lb)	348.5 W/kg / 0.21 vhp/lb
Chevrolet Corvette ZR-12	1989	512 kW (687 hp)	1,465 kg (3,230 lb)	349 W/kg / 0.21 hp/lb
Ford Taurus NASCAR stock car	1998	589 kW (790 hp)	1,678 kg (3,699 lb)	351 W/kg / 0.21 hp/lb
Campbell-Railton Blue Bird Land speed record car	1933	1,715 kW (2,300 hp)	4,826 kg (10,640 lb)	355 W/kg / 0.22 hp/lb
Porsche 910 Carrera 10	1966	205 kW (275 hp)	575 kg (1,268 lb)	356 W/kg / 0.22 hp/lb
Chevrolet Corvette C5-R GTS	1999	455 kW (610 hp)	1,277 kg (2,815 lb)	356 W/kg / 0.22 hp/lb
Rolls-Royce Merlin-powered V12 Rover SD1	1981	485 kW (650 hp)	1,360 kg (3,000 lb)	356 W/kg / 0.22 hp/lb
Ford RS200 Evolution Group B	1985	377 kW (506 hp)	1,050 kg (2,310 lb)	359 W/kg / 0.22 hp/lb
Peugeot Proxima	1986	507 kW (680 hp)	1,374 kg (3,029 lb)	369 W/kg / 0.22 hp/lb
Ford GT-90	1995	537 kW (720 hp)	1,451 kg (3,199 lb)	370 W/kg / 0.22 hp/lb
Ferrari 246 F1 Formula One	1958	209 kW (280 hp)	560 kg (1,230 lb)	373 W/kg / 0.23 hp/lb
Mercedes-Benz C-Class V6 DTM	1996	373 kW (500 hp)	980 kg (2,160 lb)	380 W/kg / 0.23 hp/lb
KF1 kart racing go-kart		30 kW (40 hp)	77 kg (170 lb)	387 W/kg / 0.235 hp/lb
Mercedes-Benz W154 Grand Prix race car	1939	360 kW (480 hp)	910 kg (2,010 lb)	396 W/kg / 0.24 hp/lb
Maserati 420M/58	1958	302 kW (405 hp)	758 kg (1,671 lb)	397.5 W/kg / 0.24 hp/lb
McLaren F1 GT	1997	467.6 kW (627.1 hp)	1,220 kg (2,690 lb)	403 W/kg / 0.24 hp/lb
Lotus 12 Formula One	1958	130.5 kW (175.0 hp)	320 kg (710 lb)	408 W/kg / 0.25 hp/lb
Lola T70	1969	343 kW (460 hp)	840 kg (1,850 lb)	408 W/kg / 0.25 hp/lb
Matra MS650	1969	306 kW (410 hp)	740 kg (1,630 lb)	413 W/kg / 0.25 hp/lb
Kremer K8 Spyder Le Mans Prototype	1994	395 kW (530 hp)	952.5 kg (2,100 lb)	415 W/kg / 0.25 hp/lb
Ferrari 330 P4	1967	331 kW (444 hp)	792 kg (1,746 lb)	418 W/kg / 0.25 hp/lb
Ford Mustang Boss 10.0L Concept	1994	637.5 kW (854.9 hp)	1,517 kg (3,344 lb)	420 W/kg / 0.25 hp/lb
Callaway SledgeHammer Corvette	1987	670 kW (900 hp)	1,589 kg (3,503 lb)	421 W/kg 0.26 hp/lb
Porsche 911 GT1-98 Group GT1	1998	400 kW (540 hp)	950 kg (2,090 lb)	421 W/kg / 0.26 hp/lb
Ducati 996	1999	82 kW (110 hp)	198 kg (437 lb)	421 W/kg / 0.26 hp/lb
Porsche 908 Group 6	1971	280 kW (380 hp)	650 kg (1,430 lb)	424.5 W/kg / 0.26 hp/lb
Auto Union Type D	1939	362 kW (485 hp)	850 kg (1,870 lb)	425.5 W/kg / 0.26 hp/lb
Schuppan 962CR	1992	447 kW (599 hp)	1,050 kg (2,310 lb)	426 W/kg / 0.26 hp/lb
Nissan R390 GT1 Group GT1	1997	478 kW (641 hp)	1,098 kg (2,421 lb)	435 W/kg / 0.26 hp/lb
Porsche Type 360 Cisitalia Grand Prix car	1946	287 kW (385 hp)	650 kg (1,430 lb)	442 W/kg / 0.27 hp/lb
Miss Britain III hydroplane	1933	1,007 kW (1,350 hp)	2,268 kg (5,000 lb)	444 W/kg / 0.27 hp/lb
Porsche WSC-95 Le Mans Prototype	1995	403 kW (540 hp)	890 kg (1,960 lb)	452.5 W/kg / 0.275 hp/lb
Aprilia RSV Mille	1998	95 kW (127 hp)	210 kg (460 lb)	454.5 W/kg / 0.28 hp/lb
Ferrari Modulo	1970	410 kW (550 hp)	900 kg (2,000 lb)	456 W/kg / 0.28 hp/lb
Mercedes-Benz W125 Rekordwagen	1938	541 kW (725 hp)	1,185 kg (2,612 lb)	456 W/kg / 0.28 hp/lb
Renault Espace F1	1995	596.5 kW (799.9 hp)	1,300 kg (2,900 lb)	459 W/kg / 0.28 hp/lb
Riley Stair's Pontiac Firebird Trans-Am	1970	746 kW (1,000 hp)	1,610 kg (3,550 lb)	463 W/kg / 0.28 hp/lb
Auto Union Type C	1936	382 kW (512 hp)	824 kg (1,817 lb)	464 W/kg / 0.28 hp/lb
Lamborghini Diablo GT1 Stradale	1996	488 kW (654 hp)	1,050 kg (2,310 lb)	465 W/kg / 0.28 hp/lb
Packard-Bentley	1930	1,118.5 kW (1,499.9 hp)	2,400 kg (5,300 lb)	466 W/kg / 0.28 hp/lb
Georg Plasa's BMW E36 M3 Judd V8 Hillclimbing	-	391.5 kW (525.0 hp)	895 kg (1,973 lb)	467 W/kg / 0.28 hp/lb
Ken Block Ford F-150 HOONITRUCK	-	682 kW (915 hp)	1,456 kg (3,210 lb)	468 W/kg / 0.28 hp/lb
Mercedes-Benz 190 Judd V8 hillclimb	-	410 kW (550 hp)	870 kg (1,920 lb)	471 W/kg / 0.29 hp/lb
Chaparral 2E Can-Am	1966	354 kW (475 hp)	749 kg (1,651 lb)	473 W/kg / 0.29 hp/lb
Lotus Elise V8	-	336 kW (451 hp)	700 kg (1,500 lb)	479 W/kg / 0.29 hp/lb
McLaren M4B Formula One	1967	206 kW (276 hp)	435.5 kg (960 lb)	479.5 W/kg / 0.29 hp/lb
BMW V12 LMR Le Mans Prototype	1999	432.5 kW (580.0 hp)	900 kg (2,000 lb)	480.5 W/kg / 0.29 hp/lb
Lancia Delta Integrale Evo	-	522 kW (700 hp)	1,080 kg (2,380 lb)	483 W/kg / 0.29 hp/lb
McLaren F1 LM	1995	500 kW (670 hp)	1,062 kg (2,341 lb)	483.5 W/kg / 0.29 hp/lb
Jaguar XJ220-S	1994	514.5 kW (690.0 hp)	1,052 kg (2,319 lb)	489 W/kg / 0.29 hp/lb
Hot Wheels Twin Mill	1969	1,045 kW (1,401 hp)	2,130 kg (4,700 lb)	491 W/kg / 0.30 hp/lb
Ferrari F40 Competizione	1989	515 kW (691 hp)	1,040 kg (2,290 lb)	495.5 W/kg / 0.30 hp/lb
Courage C41 sports prototype	1995	418 kW (561 hp)	841 kg (1,854 lb)	496.5 W/kg / 0.30 hp/lb
Panoz Esperante GTR-1	1997	447 kW (599 hp)	898 kg (1,980 lb)	498 W/kg / 0.30 hp/lb
Lancia LC1 Group 6 sports car	1982	343 kW (460 hp)	665 kg (1,466 lb)	516 W/kg / 0.31 hp/lb
CALSONIC Nissan Skyline R32 Group A	-	761 kW (1,021 hp)	1,430 kg (3,150 lb)	532 W/kg / 0.32 hp/lb
De Tomaso P70	1965	354 kW (475 hp)	660 kg (1,460 lb)	537 W/kg / 0.33 hp/lb
Koenig C62	1991	597 kW (801 hp)	1,100 kg (2,400 lb)	542 W/kg / 0.33 hp/lb
Alister McRae's Subaru Impreza WRC	1998	656 kW (880 hp)	1,200 kg (2,600 lb)	547 W/kg / 0.33 hp/lb
Lotus 29 USAC IndyCar	1963	281 kW (377 hp)	513 kg (1,131 lb)	547 W/kg / 0.33 hp/lb
McLaren M10A Formula 5000	1969	373 kW (500 hp)	680 kg (1,500 lb)	548 W/kg / 0.33 hp/lb
Ferrari Sigma Formula One show car	1969	325 kW (436 hp)	590 kg (1,300 lb)	551 W/kg / 0.335 hp/lb
Vector WX-3	1993	895 kW (1,200 hp)	1,620 kg (3,570 lb)	552 W/kg / 0.34 hp/lb
Ferrari 333 SP sports prototype	1994	478 kW (641 hp)	863 kg (1,903 lb)	554 W/kg / 0.34 hp/lb
Thunderbolt land speed record car	1937	3,504 kW (4,699 hp)	6,305 kg (13,900 lb)	556 W/kg / 0.34 hp/lb
Ferrari 512 M Group 5 sports car	1970	449 kW (602 hp)	815 kg (1,797 lb)	558 W/kg / 0.34 hp/lb
Lotus 72 Formula One	1970-1975	335.5 kW (449.9 hp)	600 kg (1,300 lb)	559 W/kg / 0.34 hp/lb
Arno XI hydroplane	1953	447 kW (599 hp)	800 kg (1,800 lb)	559 W/kg / 0.34 hp/lb
Zakspeed Ford Capri Turbo Group 5	1981	455 kW (610 hp)	795 kg (1,753 lb)	572 W/kg / 0.35 hp/lb
Ferrari 312 P Group 6 sports car	1969	331 kW (444 hp)	585 kg (1,290 lb)	574 W/kg / 0.35 hp/lb
Ford Transit Supervan 3	1994	522 kW (700 hp)	890 kg (1,960 lb)	586.5 W/kg / 0.36 hp/lb
McLaren M7A	1968	306 kW (410 hp)	517 kg (1,140 lb)	591 W/kg / 0.36 hp/lb
Porsche 956 Group C sports prototype	1982	474 kW (636 hp)	800 kg (1,800 lb)	592.5 W/kg / 0.36 hp/lb
Vector W8	1989	895 kW (1,200 hp)	1,506 kg (3,320 lb)	594 W/kg / 0.36 hp/lb
Aston Martin AMR1	1989	537 kW (720 hp)	902 kg (1,989 lb)	595 W/kg / 0.36 hp/lb
TVR Cerbera Speed 12	1996	597 kW (801 hp)	1,000 kg (2,200 lb)	596.5 W/kg / 0.36 hp/lb
Jaguar XJR-8 Group C sports prototype	1987	540 kW (720 hp)	900 kg (2,000 lb)	596.5 W/kg / 0.36 hp/lb
Mercedes-Benz Sauber C11 Group C sports prototype	1990	545 kW (731 hp)	905 kg (1,995 lb)	601.5 W/kg / 0.365 hp/lb
Lotus 78 Formula One	1977-1978	354 kW (475 hp)	588 kg (1,296 lb)	602 W/kg / 0.36 hp/lb
Porsche 962C sports prototype	1987	537 kW (720 hp)	890 kg (1,960 lb)	603 W/kg / 0.37 hp/lb
BRM Type 15 Formula One	1950	447 kW (599 hp)	737 kg (1,625 lb)	607 W/kg / 0.37 hp/lb
Tyrrell P34 Formula One	1976	362 kW (485 hp)	595 kg (1,312 lb)	608 W/kg / 0.37 hp/lb
Brabham BT43 Formula 5000	1974	373 kW (500 hp)	612 kg (1,349 lb)	609 W/kg / 0.37 hp/lb
Mazda MXR-01 Group C sports prototype	1992	462 kW (620 hp)	750 kg (1,650 lb)	616 W/kg / 0.375 hp/lb
Lola T332 Formula 5000	1976	410 kW (550 hp)	665 kg (1,466 lb)	617 W/kg / 0.375 hp/lb
Honda RA301 Formula One	1968	328 kW (440 hp)	530 kg (1,170 lb)	619 W/kg / 0.38 hp/lb
Brabham BT24 Formula One	1969	321 kW (430 hp)	517 kg (1,140 lb)	620 W/kg / 0.38 hp/lb
Mazda RX-792P IMSA GTP	1992	515 kW (691 hp)	830 kg (1,830 lb)	620 W/kg / 0.38 hp/lb
Lechner Spyder SC91 sports prototype	1991	559 kW (750 hp)	900 kg (2,000 lb)	621 W/kg / 0.38 hp/lb
Lotus 49B Formula One	1968	313 kW (420 hp)	501 kg (1,105 lb)	625 W/kg / 0.38 hp/lb
Mazda 787B Group C	1990	522 kW (700 hp)	830 kg (1,830 lb)	629 W/kg / 0.38 hp/lb
Lola T92/10 Group C sports prototype	1992	485 kW (650 hp)	771 kg (1,700 lb)	629 W/kg / 0.38 hp/lb
Mercedes-Benz W125 Grand Prix race car	1937	475 kW (637 hp)	750 kg (1,650 lb)	633 W/kg / 0.38 hp/lb
Jaguar XJR-9 Group C sports prototype	1988	560 kW (750 hp)	880 kg (1,940 lb)	634 W/kg / 0.38 hp/lb
McLaren M6A Can-Am	1967	392 kW (526 hp)	615 kg (1,356 lb)	636.5 W/kg / 0.39 hp/lb
Desmond Gutzeit's Nissan Skyline R32 GT-R hillclimb	-	895 kW (1,200 hp)	1,400 kg (3,100 lb)	639 W/kg / 0.39 hp/lb
Ferrari F50 GT	1996	552 kW (740 hp)	860 kg (1,900 lb)	641 W/kg / 0.39 hp/lb
Jaguar XJR-14 Group C sports prototype	1991	485 kW (650 hp)	750 kg (1,650 lb)	646 W/kg / 0.39 hp/lb
Porsche 935 Group 5	1981	630 kW (840 hp)	970 kg (2,140 lb)	650 W/kg / 0.395 hp/lb
Nova Engineering R91CK Group C	1991	588 kW (789 hp)	900 kg (2,000 lb)	653 W/kg / 0.40 hp/lb
Liam Doran's Ford RS200 hillciimb	-	686 kW (920 hp)	1,050 kg (2,310 lb)	653 W/kg / 0.40 hp/lb
Reynard 93D-Mugen Formula 3000	1993	350.5 kW (470.0 hp)	535 kg (1,179 lb)	655 W/kg / 0.40 hp/lb
Kremer K4	1981	671 kW (900 hp)	1,025 kg (2,260 lb)	655 W/kg / 0.40 hp/lb
Williams FW07C Formula One	1981	354 kW (475 hp)	540 kg (1,190 lb)	656 W/kg / 0.40 hp/lb
JAWA motorcycle speedway bike	1996	56 kW (75 hp)	85 kg (187 lb)	659 W/kg / 0.40 hp/lb
Facetti 308 Carma FF	1979	626 kW (839 hp)	950 kg (2,090 lb)	659 W/kg / 0.40 hp/lb
Ferrari 612 Can-Am	1968	456 kW (612 hp)	700 kg (1,500 lb)	660.5 W/kg / 0.40 hp/lb
Brabham BT46 Formula One	1978	388 kW (520 hp)	585 kg (1,290 lb)	663 W/kg / 0.40 hp/lb
Alfa Romeo 33SC12 Turbo Group 6	1976	477 kW (640 hp)	720 kg (1,590 lb)	663 W/kg / 0.40 hp/lb
Railton Special land speed record car	1938	2,013 kW (2,699 hp)	3,000 kg (6,600 lb)	671 W/kg / 0.40 hp/lb
Mercedes-Benz Sauber C9 Group C	1989	611 kW (819 hp)	905 kg (1,995 lb)	675 W/kg / 0.41 hp/lb
Ralt RT24-Mugen Formula 3000	1992	365 kW (489 hp)	535 kg (1,179 lb)	683 W/kg / 0.41 hp/lb
Peugeot 905B EVO	1991	533 kW (715 hp)	780 kg (1,720 lb)	683.3 W/kg / 0.41 hp/lb
Lotec C1000	1995	746 kW (1,000 hp)	1,080 kg (2,380 lb)	690.5 W/kg / 0.42 hp/lb
Reynard 92D-Cosworth Formula 3000	1992	373 kW (500 hp)	535 kg (1,179 lb)	697 W/kg / 0.42 hp/lb
Lancia LC2 Group C sports prototype	1983	597 kW (801 hp)	850 kg (1,870 lb)	702 W/kg / 0.43 hp/lb
Ferrari 312T	1975-1980	380 kW (510 hp)	540 kg (1,190 lb)	704 W/kg / 0.43 hp/lb
Toyota TS010 Group C sports prototype 1992	1992	537 kW (720 hp)	750 kg (1,650 lb)	716 W/kg / 0.435 hp/lb
Rod Millen's Toyota Celica Pikes Peak Hillclimb	1994	634 kW (850 hp)	850 kg (1,870 lb)	716 W/kg / 0.44 hp/lb
Lotus 56 Formula One	1971	447 kW (599 hp)	600 kg (1,300 lb)	746 W/kg / 0.45 hp/lb
Toyota WRC Group S 222D MR2 Prototype rally car	1986	559 kW (750 hp)	750 kg (1,650 lb)	746 W/kg / 0.45 hp/lb
Chevrolet Corvette GTP	1985	671 kW (900 hp)	884.5 kg (1,950 lb)	759 W/kg / 0.46 hp/lb
BMW E30 M3 2JZ-GTE hillclimb	-	974 kW (1,306 hp)	1,280 kg (2,820 lb)	761 W/kg / 0.46 hp/lb
Ken Block Hoonigan "Hoonicorn" Ford Mustang RTR v2	1965	1,044 kW (1,400 hp)	1,360 kg (3,000 lb)	768 W/kg / 0.47 hp/lb
Mercedes-Benz T80	1939	2,237 kW (3,000 hp)	2,896 kg (6,385 lb)	772 W/kg / 0.47 hp/lb
Miss America X speedboat	1932	5,667 kW (7,600 hp)	7,257.5 kg (16,000 lb)	781 W/kg / 0.475 hp/lb
McLaren M8D	1970	507 kW (680 hp)	634 kg (1,398 lb)	800 W/kg / 0.49 hp/lb
Reynard 94D-Cosworth Formula 3000	1994	429 kW (575 hp)	535 kg (1,179 lb)	801 W/kg / 0.49 hp/lb
Lotus 64 USAC IndyCar	1969	522 kW (700 hp)	635 kg (1,400 lb)	822 W/kg / 0.50 hp/lb
Chaparral 2K CART Indy car	1979	582 kW (780 hp)	703 kg (1,550 lb)	827 W/kg / 0.50 hp/lb
Nissan R90C Group C	1990	746 kW (1,000 hp)	900 kg (2,000 lb)	829 W/kg / 0.50 hp/lb
Nissan GTP ZX-Turbo IMSA GTP	1985	716 kW (960 hp)	860 kg (1,900 lb)	832 W/kg / 0.51 hp/lb
Lancia Delta S4 Group B rally car	1985	746 kW (1,000 hp)	890 kg (1,960 lb)	838 W/kg / 0.51 hp/lb
Toyota Tacoma Pikes Peak	1998	746 kW (1,000 hp)	885 kg (1,951 lb)	843 W/kg / 0.51 hp/lb
Benetton B195 Formula One	1995	503 kW (675 hp)	595 kg (1,312 lb)	846 W/kg / 0.51 hp/lb
Penske PC-18 CART IndyCar	1989	596.5 kW (799.9 hp)	703 kg (1,550 lb)	848.5 W/kg / 0.52 hp/lb
Penske PC-25 CART IndyCar	1996	596.5 kW (799.9 hp)	703 kg (1,550 lb)	848.5 W/kg / 0.52 hp/lb
McLaren M20 Can-Am	1972	587 kW (787 hp)	690 kg (1,520 lb)	850.5 W/kg / 0.52 hp/lb
The Fate of the Furious Plymouth GTX	1971	1,491 kW (1,999 hp)	1,724 kg (3,801 lb)	865 W/kg / 0.53 hp/lb
March 84C USAC IndyCar	1984	596.5 kW (799.9 hp)	685 kg (1,510 lb)	871 W/kg / 0.53 hp/lb
F1 Experiences 2-Seater car	1998	559 kW (750 hp)	640 kg (1,410 lb)	873 W/kg / 0.53 hp/lb
Ferrari 412 T2 Formula One	1995	522 kW (700 hp)	595 kg (1,312 lb)	877 W/kg / 0.53 hp/lb
Reynard 94I CART Indy car	1994	619 kW (830 hp)	703 kg (1,550 lb)	880 W/kg / 0.53 hp/lb
Dallara F189 Formula One	1989	444 kW (595 hp)	500 kg (1,100 lb)	887 W/kg / 0.54 hp/lb
March 881 Formula One	1988	447 kW (599 hp)	500 kg (1,100 lb)	895 W/kg / 0.54 hp/lb
Toyota Eagle MkIII sports prototype	1993	746 kW (1,000 hp)	830 kg (1,830 lb)	898 W/kg / 0.55 hp/lb
Reynard 99I CART Indy car	1999	634 kW (850 hp)	703 kg (1,550 lb)	901.5 W/kg / 0.55 hp/lb
Rahal-Hogan R/H-001 CART Indy car	1993	634 kW (850 hp)	703 kg (1,550 lb)	901.5 W/kg / 0.55 hp/lb
Honda NSR500 Grand Prix motorcycle racing	1994–1997	149 kW (200 hp)	165 kg (364 lb)	904 W/kg / 0.55 hp/lb
Nissan R383 Group 7 sports prototype	1970	671 kW (900 hp)	740 kg (1,630 lb)	907 W/kg / 0.55 hp/lb
Bluebird CN7 land speed record car	1964	3,320 kW (4,450 hp)	3,658 kg (8,065 lb)	907 W/kg / 0.55 hp/lb
Lotus 101 Formula One	1989	455 kW (610 hp)	500 kg (1,100 lb)	909.75 W/kg / 0.55 hp/lb
Suzuki Escudo Pikes Peak International Hillclimb	1996	734.5 kW (985.0 hp)	800 kg (1,800 lb)	918 W/kg / 0.56 hp/lb
McLaren MP4/4 Formula One	1988	522 kW (700 hp)	540 kg (1,190 lb)	967 W/kg / 0.59 hp/lb
Benetton B190 Formula One	1990	485 kW (650 hp)	500 kg (1,100 lb)	969 W/kg / 0.59 hp/lb
McLaren M12 Can-Am	1969	567 kW (760 hp)	590 kg (1,300 lb)	974 W/kg / 0.59 hp/lb
Benetton B192 Formula One	1992	507 kW (680 hp)	505 kg (1,113 lb)	1003 W/kg / 0.61 hp/lb
McLaren MP4/14 Formula One	1999	604 kW (810 hp)	600 kg (1,300 lb)	1007 W/kg / 0.61 hp/lb
Ferrari 641 Formula One	1990	507 kW (680 hp)	503 kg (1,109 lb)	1008 W/kg / 0.61 hp/lb
Tyrrell 022 Formula One	1994	522 kW (700 hp)	515 kg (1,135 lb)	1014 W/kg / 0.62 hp/lb
Oldsmobile Aerotech	1987	746 kW (1,000 hp)	726 kg (1,601 lb)	1027.5 W/kg / 0.625 hp/lb
McLaren MP4/5B	1990	514.5 kW (690.0 hp)	500 kg (1,100 lb)	1029 W/kg / 0.626 hp/lb
McLaren MP4/8 Formula One	1993	522 kW (700 hp)	505 kg (1,113 lb)	1034 W/kg / 0.63 hp/lb
McLaren MP4/6 Formula One	1991	541 kW (725 hp)	505 kg (1,113 lb)	1070.5 W/kg / 0.65 hp/lb
Lotus 107C	1994	541 kW (725 hp)	505 kg (1,113 lb)	1071 W/kg / 0.65 hp/lb
Benetton B194 Formula One	1994	552 kW (740 hp)	515 kg (1,135 lb)	1086 W/kg / 0.66 hp/lb
Penske PC-23 CART Indy car	1994	764 kW (1,025 hp)	703 kg (1,550 lb)	1087 W/kg / 0.66 hp/lb
McLaren MP4/7A Formula One	1992	582 kW (780 hp)	506 kg (1,116 lb)	1149.5 W/kg / 0.70 hp/lb
BMW GTP IMSA GTP	1986	1,044 kW (1,400 hp)	908 kg (2,002 lb)	1150 W/kg / 0.70 hp/lb
Bluebird K7 jet-engined hydroplane	1955	2,610 kW (3,500 hp)	2,268 kg (5,000 lb)	1151 W/kg / 0.70 hp/lb
Williams FW15C Formula One	1993	582 kW (780 hp)	505 kg (1,113 lb)	1152 W/kg / 0.70 hp/lb
Williams FW16 Formula One	1994	619 kW (830 hp)	505 kg (1,113 lb)	1226 W/kg / 0.74 hp/lb
Ferrari 412 T1 Formula One	1994	634 kW (850 hp)	505 kg (1,113 lb)	1255 W/kg / 0.76 hp/lb
Ferrari F1/87 Formula One	1987	708 kW (949 hp)	540 kg (1,190 lb)	1312 W/kg / 0.80 hp/lb
Furious 7 Dodge Charger 'Maximus'	1968	2,237 kW (3,000 hp)	1,590 kg (3,510 lb)	1407 W/kg / 0.855 hp/lb
Porsche 917/30 Can-Am Spyder	1972-1973	1,178 kW (1,580 hp)	800 kg (1,800 lb)	1473 W/kg / 0.896 hp/lb
Red Victor 2 Vauxhall Victor	1972	1,715 kW (2,300 hp)	1,052 kg (2,319 lb)	1630 W/kg / 0.99 hp/lb
Lotus 98T Formula One	1986	895 kW (1,200 hp)	540 kg (1,190 lb)	1657 W/kg / 1.0 hp/lb
BMW Brabham BT52 Formula One	1983	954.5 kW (1,280.0 hp)	540 kg (1,190 lb)	1767.5 W/kg / 1.07 hp/lb
BMW Benetton B186, Brabham BT55, & Arrows A9 Formula One	1986	1,118.5 kW (1,499.9 hp)	540 kg (1,190 lb)	2071 W/kg / 1.26 hp/lb
Thrust2 land speed record car	1983	22,000 kW (30,000 hp)	10,600 kg (23,400 lb)	2321.5 W/kg / 1.41 hp/lb
Thrust SSC land speed record car	1997	76,000 kW (102,000 hp)	10,600 kg (23,400 lb)	7176 W/kg / 4.36 hp/lb
Shockwave jet-powered Peterbilt 359 semi-truck	1985	26,845 kW (36,000 hp)	3,084 kg (6,799 lb)	8703.5 W/kg / 5.29 hp/lb
Blue Flame land speed record car	1970	43,000 kW (58,000 hp)	1,800 kg (4,000 lb)	23,838 W/kg / 14.5 hp/lb

==== Aircraft ====
Propeller aircraft depend on high power-to-weight ratios to generate sufficient thrust to achieve sustained flight, and then for speed.

Aircraft	Power	MTOW	Power-to-weight ratio
Hughes H-4 Hercules Spruce Goose	21,120 kW / 24,000 hp	180,000 kg (400,000 lb)	117 W/kg / 0.06 hp/lb
Boeing B-29 Superfortress	6,400 kW / 8,800 hp	60,555 kg (133,501 lb)	106 W/kg / 0.07 hp/lb
Boeing B-17 Flying Fortress	3,580 kW / 4,800 hp	29,700 kg (65,500 lb)	121 W/kg / 0.07 hp/lb
Cessna 337D Super Skymaster	320 kW (430 hp)	1,996 kg (4,400 lb)	160 W/kg / 0.1 hp/lb
Antonov An-22	44,744 kW / 60,000 hp	250,000 kg (550,000 lb)	179 W/kg / 0.11 hp/lb
Lockheed C-130 Hercules	13,691 kW (18,360 hp)	70,307 kg (155,000 lb)	195 W/kg / 0.12 hp/lb
Lockheed Martin C-130J Super Hercules	13,831 kW (18,548 hp)	70,307 kg (155,000 lb)	197 W/kg / 0.12 hp/lb
Antonov An-28	1,440 kW / 1,920 hp	6,500 kg (14,300 lb)	222 W/kg / 0.13 hp/lb
Airbus A400M Atlas	32,811 kW (44,000 hp)	141,000 kg (311,000 lb)	233 W/kg / 0.14 hp/lb
North American P-51 Mustang Fighter aircraft 1941	1,280 kW (1,720 hp)	5,488 kg (12,099 lb)	233 W/kg / 0.14 hp/lb
Tupolev Tu-95	44,000 kW (59,000 hp)	188,000 kg (414,000 lb)	234 W/kg / 0.14 hp/lb
Tupolev Tu-142	44,130 kW (59,180 hp)	185,000 kg (408,000 lb)	239 W/kg / 0.15 hp/lb
Lockheed P-38 Lightning	2,400 kW (3,200 hp)	7,938 kg (17,500 lb)	302 W/kg / 0.15 hp/lb
Bombardier Dash 8 Q400 turboprop airliner	7,562 kW (10,141 bhp)	30,481 kg (67,199 lb)	248 W/kg / 0.15 hp/lb
Mitsubishi A6M Zero Fighter aircraft 1939	710 kW (950 hp)	2,796 kg (6,164 lb)	254 W/kg / 0.15 hp/lb
Tupolev Tu-114	44,130 kW (59,180 hp)	177,000 kg (390,000 lb)	249 W/kg / 0.16 hp/lb
Messerschmitt Bf 109 Fighter aircraft 1935	1,085 kW (1,455 bhp)	3,400 kg (7,500 lb)	319 W/kg / 0.19 hp/lb
Bell Boeing V-22 Osprey	9,180 kW / 12,300 hp	27,400 kg (60,400 lb)	335 W/kg / 0.2 hp/lb
Supermarine Spitfire Fighter aircraft 1936	1,096 kW (1,470 bhp)	3,049 kg (6,722 lb)	359 W/kg / 0.22 hp/lb
Republic XF-84H Thunderscreech 1955	4,365 kW (5,854 bhp)	12,293 kg (27,101 lb)	355 W/kg / 0.22 hp/lb
de Havilland Hornet Fighter aircraft 1946	3,087 kW (4,140 hp)	8,278 kg (18,250 lb)	373 W/kg / 0.23 hp/lb
Supermarine S.6	1,400 kW (1,900 hp)	2,618 kg (5,772 lb)	535 W/kg / 0.33 hp/lb
Supermarine S.6B	1,750 kW (2,350 hp)	2,761 kg (6,087 lb)	634 W/kg / 0.39 hp/lb

===== Thrust-to-weight ratio =====
Jet aircraft produce thrust directly.

Aircraft	Thrust	MTOW	Thrust-to-weight ratio
Airbus A300-600F	2 × 61,000 lbf (270 kN)	170.5 t / 375,888 lb	0.325
McDonnell Douglas MD-11	3 × 62,000 lbf (280 kN)	273.3 t / 602,500 lb	0.309
Boeing 707-320B/C	4 × 19,000 lbf (85 kN)	151.3 t / 333,600 lb	0.228
Antonov An-225 Mriya	6 × 51,600 lbf (230 kN)	640 t / 1,410,958 lb	0.219
McDonnell Douglas DC-10-10	3 × 40,000 lbf (180 kN)	195 t / 430,000 lb	0.279
Messerschmitt Me 262	2 × 1,980 lbf (8.8 kN)	7.13 t / 15,719 lb	0.252
Airbus A380	4 × 80,210 lbf (356.8 kN)	575 t / 1,267,658 lb	0.253
Airbus A320	2 × 27,000 lbf (120 kN)	78 t / 172,000 lb	0.314
Lockheed P-80 Shooting Star	1 × 4,600 lbf (20 kN)	7.65 t / 16,856 lb	0.273
Boeing 737 MAX 7	2 × 29,317 lbf (130.41 kN)	80.29 t / 177,000 lb	0.331
Tupolev Tu-154M	3 × 23,000 lbf (100 kN)	102 t / 225,000 lb	0.204
Northrop Grumman B-2 Spirit	4 × 77 kN (17,000 lbf)	170.6 t / 376,000 lb	0.184
Northrop YB-49	8 × 4,000 lbf (18 kN)	87.97 t / 193,938 lb	0.165
Boeing 757-200	2 × 193 kN (43,000 lbf)	115.66 t / 255,000 lb	0.341
Boeing 747-300	4 × 247 kN (56,000 lbf)	378 t / 833,000 lb	0.273
Airbus A340-500	4 × 61,902 lbf (275.35 kN)	380 t / 840,000 lb	0.295
Boeing 777-300ER	2 × 115,300 lbf (513 kN)	351.53 t / 775,000 lb	0.298
McDonnell Douglas DC-9-15	2 × 15,500 lbf (69 kN)	41.14 t / 90,700 lb	0.342
Messerschmitt Me 163 Komet	1 × 3,307 lbf (14.71 kN)	4.31 t / 9,500 lb	0.348
Saunders-Roe SR.53	1 × 9,640 lbf (42.9 kN)	8.35 t / 18,400 lb	0.524
Lockheed T-33	1 × 4,600 lbf (20 kN)	6.832 t / 15,061 lb	0.611
Concorde	4 × 38,050 lbf (169.3 kN)	185.07 t / 408,010 lb	0.373
Lockheed SR-71 Blackbird	2 × 25,000 lbf (110 kN)	78 t / 172,000 lb	0.291
Saunders-Roe SR.A/1	2 × 3,850 lbf (17.1 kN)	8.63 t / 19,033 lb	0.405
Bell X-1E	1 × 6,000 lbf (27 kN)	6.69 t / 14,750 lb	0.407
Lockheed F-117A Nighthawk	2 × 10,600 lbf (47 kN)	23.813 t / 52,500 lb	0.404
Boeing 2707 SST	4 × 63,200 lbf (281 kN)	306.175 t / 675,000 lb	0.375
Lockheed L-2000 SST	4 × 65,000 lbf (290 kN)	267.62 t / 590,000 lb	0.441
McDonnell Douglas MD-83	2 × 21,000 lbf (93 kN)	72.6 t / 160,000 lb	0.263
Lockheed F-104 Starfighter	1 × 15,600 lbf (69 kN)	13.16 t / 29,027 lb	0.537
Lockheed Martin F-35 Lightning II	1 × 43,000 lbf (190 kN)	31.751 t / 70,000 lb	0.614
Grumman F-14 Tomcat	2 × 23,400 lbf (104 kN)	33.725 t / 74,350 lb	0.629
Boeing F/A-18E/F Super Hornet	2 × 22,000 lbf (98 kN)	29.937 t / 66,000 lb	0.667
General Dynamics F-16 Fighting Falcon	1 × 29,500 lbf (131 kN)	19.187 t / 42,300 lb	0.697
McDonnell Douglas F-15 Eagle	2 × 23,770 lbf (105.7 kN)	30.844 t / 68,000 lb	0.699
Eurofighter Typhoon	2 × 20,000 lbf (89 kN)	23.5 t / 51,809 lb	0.772
McDonnell Douglas F-15E Strike Eagle	2 × 23,770 lbf (105.7 kN)	36.741 t / 81,000 lb	0.587
Saunders-Roe SR.177	1 × 24,000 lbf (110 kN)	12.78 t / 28,174 lb	0.852
Hawker Siddeley P.1127	1 × 15,000 lbf (67 kN)	7.71 t / 17,000 lb	0.882
Lockheed Martin F-22 Raptor	2 × 37,000 lbf (160 kN)	38 t / 83,500 lb	0.886
Tupolev Tu-160	4 × 55,000 lbf (240 kN)	275 t / 606,271 lb	0.181
North American X-15	1 × 70,400 lbf (313 kN)	15.42 t / 34,000 lb	2.071

=== Human ===
Power-to-weight ratio is important in cycling, since it determines acceleration and speed during hill climbs. Since a cyclist's power-to-weight output decreases with fatigue, it is normally discussed in relation to the length of time that they maintain that power. A professional cyclist can produce over 20 W/kg (0.012 hp/lb) as a five-second maximum.

== See also ==
- Energy density – Energy per volume
- Engine power – Power output of an engine
- Propulsive efficiency – Measure of efficiency in aerospace engineering
- Specific output – Measure of internal combustion engine performance
- Thrust-to-weight ratio – Dimensionless ratio of thrust to weight of a propelled vehicle
- Vehicular metrics – Metrics that denote the relative capabilities of various vehicles
- von Kármán–Gabrielli diagram – Diagram which compares the efficiency of transportation methods
