= Hennessey =

Hennessey may refer to:

== Places ==
- Hennessey, Oklahoma, United States
- Hennessey Formation, Oklahoma, United States
- Lake Hennessey, California, United States

== Other uses ==
- Hennessey (surname), including a list of people with the name
- Hennessey Performance Engineering, a sports car company
  - Hennessey Venom GT
  - Hennessey Venom F5
  - Hennessey Blackbird
- Hennessey Monoplane, a special variant of the Curtiss JN Jenny

== See also ==
- Hennessy (disambiguation)
  - Hennessy, French cognac producer
- Hennesey, a 1959–1962 television series
