= Hennessy (surname) =

Hennessy is an Irish surname, being the anglicised form of Ó hAonghusa. A variant is Hennessey.

Notable people with the surname include:

- Arthur Hennessy (1876–1959), Australian pioneer rugby league identity
- Bill Hennessy (disambiguation), several people
- Carly Smithson (née Hennessy, born 1983), Irish singer
- Charles O'Connor Hennessy (1860–1936), American politician from New Jersey
- Christie Hennessy (1945-2007), Irish singer
- Claire Hennessy (born 1986), Irish novelist
- Clinton Hennessy (born 1977), Irish sportsperson
- David Hennessy (disambiguation), several people
- Esmé Frances Hennessy (1933–2023), South African botanist
- George Hennessy, 1st Baron Windlesham (1877, 1953), British soldier and Conservative politician
- Jean Hennessy (1874–1944), French politician and member of the Hennessy family
- Jacqueline Hennessy (born 1968), journalist
- Jill Hennessy (born 1968), film and television actress
- Joe Hennessy (born 1956), former Irish sportsperson
- John Hennessy (disambiguation), several people
- Josh Hennessy (born 1985), professional ice hockey player
- Kevin Hennessy (born 1961), Irish retired sportsperson
- Larry Hennessy (1929–2008), American basketball player
- Liv Hennessy, English playwright
- Matt Hennessy (born 1997), American football player
- Matthew Hennessy, Irish computer scientist
- Neil Hennessy (born 1978), musician and music producer/engineer
- Patrick Hennessy (disambiguation), several people
- Peter Hennessy (born 1947), English historian of government
- Ryan Hennessy (born 1995), Irish singer and musician
- Séamus Hennessy (hurler, born 1989), Irish sportsperson
- Swan Hennessy (1866–1929), Irish-American composer resident in Paris
- Thomas Hennessy (politician), Irish politician
- Thomas Hennessy (American football) (born 1994), American football player
- W. Louis Hennessy (born 1955), 4th Circuit Court Associate Judge in Maryland, former Maryland Delegate
- William Hennessy (disambiguation), several people
