= Hennessy (disambiguation) =

Hennessy is a French producer of cognac.

Hennessy may also refer to:

== People ==
- Hennessy (surname), including a list of people with the name
- Hennessy Carolina (born 1995), American media personality
- Hennessy Youngman, an alter ego of Jayson Musson

== Other uses ==
- Hennessy (constituency), in Hong Kong
- Hennessy (film), a 1975 British thriller
- Hennessy's, a defunct American department store
- Hennessy & Hennessy, a former architectural firm in Australia
- Hennessy Islands, in Antarctica

== See also ==
- Hennessey (disambiguation)
- Hennesey, a 1959–1962 TV series
- Hennessy–Milner logic, in computer science
- Hennessy Road, in Hong Kong
- Hours of Hennessy, a 1530 illuminated book of hours
