= Patrick Hennessey =

Patrick Hennessey may refer to:

- Patrick Hennessey (trade unionist)
- Patrick Hennessey (barrister)

== See also ==
- Patrick Hennessy (disambiguation)
