= John Hennessey =

John Hennessey or Hennessy may refer to:

== Religious figures ==
- John Hennessy (bishop) (1825–1900), American Roman Catholic archbishop of Dubuque, Iowa
- John Joseph Hennessy (1847–1920), Irish-born prelate of the Roman Catholic Church in Kansas

== Sportspeople ==
- John F. Hennessey (1900–1981), American tennis player
- John Hennessey (rugby league), Welsh rugby league footballer
- John Hennessy (American football) (born 1955), American football player
- Jackie Hennessy (born 1940), Irish footballer

== Politics ==
- Jack Hennessy (politician) (John F. Hennessy, 1951–2024), American Democratic Party politician member of the Connecticut House of Representatives
- John Pope Hennessy (1834–1891), Irish Westminster MP, Governor of Hong Kong, grandfather of John Pope-Hennessy

== Others ==
- John A. Hennessy (1859–1951), American special investigator
- John David Hennessey (1847–1935), English-Australian author, newspaper editor and Protestant minister
- John J. Hennessey (1921–2001), American four-star army general
- John L. Hennessy (born 1952), American computer scientist; former president of Stanford University
- John M. Hennessy (born 1936), American financier and philanthropist
- John Pope-Hennessy (1913–1994), British art historian and museum director, grandson of John Pope Hennessy
- John W. Hennessey Jr. (1925–2018), American academic and educator

== See also ==
- Jack Hennessy (disambiguation)
- Hennessey (disambiguation)
