= Ó hAonghusa =

Ó hAonghusa is the surname of at least two distinct Gaelic-Irish families. It is now anglicised as Hennessy and Hennessey.

One Ó hAonghusa family were located at Cill Bheagáin, in the Kingdom of Uí Failghe, in the Irish midlands.

Another family surnamed Ó hAonghusa were found at Ros Ailithir, in the Kingdom of Desmond. It is from this family that the founder of Hennessy brandy, Richard Hennessy of Killavulen, by Mallow, and Cognac (1720–1800), descended. Richard's descendants, Maurice Hennessy and his cousin Kilian Hennessy (1907–2010), were business magnates and patriarchs of the Hennessy cognac company.

According to historian C. Thomas Cairney, the O'Hennessys were one of the chiefly families of the Corca Laoghdne tribe who in turn came from the Erainn tribe who were the second wave of Celts to settle in Ireland from 500 to 100 BC. The same historian stated that another group of O'Hennessys were one of the chiefly families of the Ui Failghe who in turn were from the Dumnonii or Laigin were the third wave of Celts to settle in Ireland during the first century BC.

== See also ==
- Hennessey (surname)
- Hennessy (surname)
- Baron Windleshame
- Irish clans
