= Jean Martell =

French distiller (1694–1753)

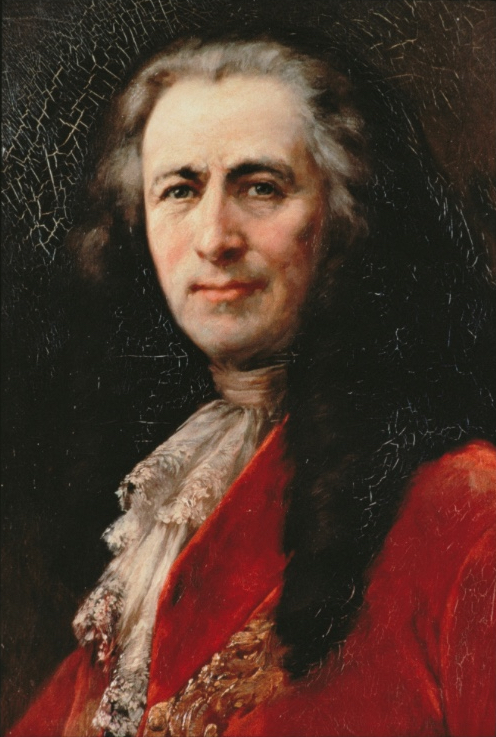
- Born: 1694; St Brelade, Jersey
- Died: 1753 (aged 58–59)
- Known for: Founder of Martell cognac distillery

Jean Martell (1694–1753) founded the French cognac distillery Martell. The company is based in the department of Charente and is nearly three centuries old – one of the oldest in France.

== Early life and education ==
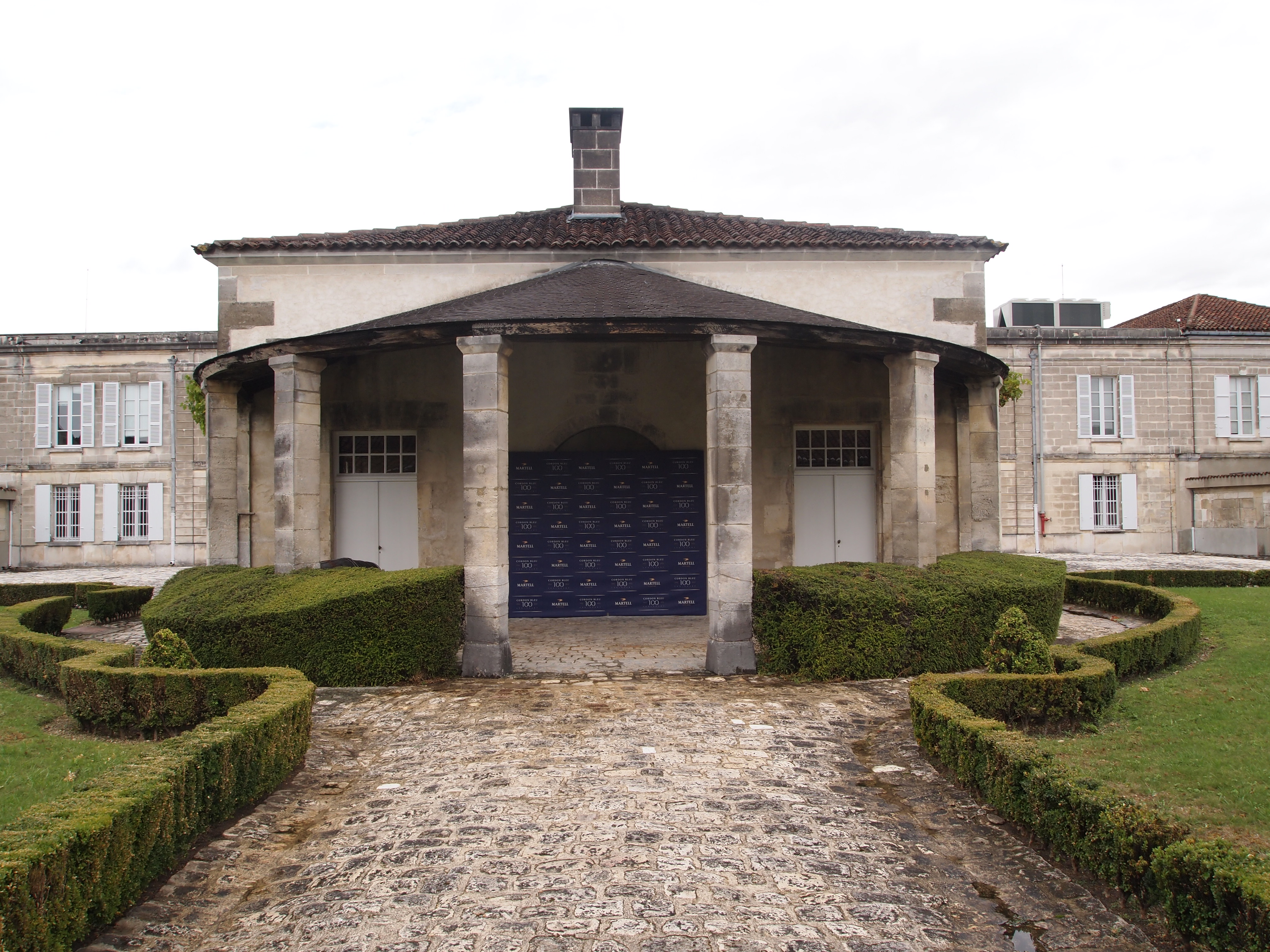
Maison Martell, in Cognac in Charente (France) (registered, 1995). The building in the middle of a square courtyard was the home of Jean Martell. This and the surrounding buildings were built in 1850 by the architect Eugène Demangeat.

Son of Thomas and Martha Martell Héraud, Jean Martell was born in 1694 in the parish of St Brelade, on the island of Jersey where the family of merchants had settled in the 11th century.

== Career ==
After working in Guernsey, he founded his trading house of spirits in 1715 at Gatebourse in Cognac, France, where he joined forces with a merchant from Bordeaux, Jean Hot. Originally they bought casks of cognac and wine for export to the Channel Islands and Europe. The company went bankrupt and then was revived. From 1721 Martell was exporting more than 200,000 litres of cognac to England, with the Duke of Orléans his most prestigious client, soon followed by George Washington and Benjamin Franklin.

Martell sold wines and spirits to the countries of northern Europe (England, the Netherlands, Germany) and to the colonies of North America. In 1869, his descendants, who took over and expanded the Martell business, established branches in the English factories of Hong Kong and Canton.

== Personal life ==
In 1726, he married Jeanne Brunet, daughter of a Cognac merchant. In 1737 he married his second wife, Rachel Lallemand, who was from a family of traders in Charente. At this time, he bought land along the Charente river where he developed his company.

== See also ==
- Richard Hennessy

== Bibliography ==
- Les Traces de la Nouvelle-France : au Québec et en Poitou-Charentes, by Marc St-Hilaire, Presses de l'Université Laval, 2008
- La Naissance d'une dynastie du cognac Richard Hennessy 1727 - 1800, by Monique Le Tac
- Le Choix de Cognac: l'établissement des négociants irlandais en eau-de-vie au XVIIIe siècle, by Louis Cullen
