= Saint-Brice, Charente =

Saint-Brice
- Commune
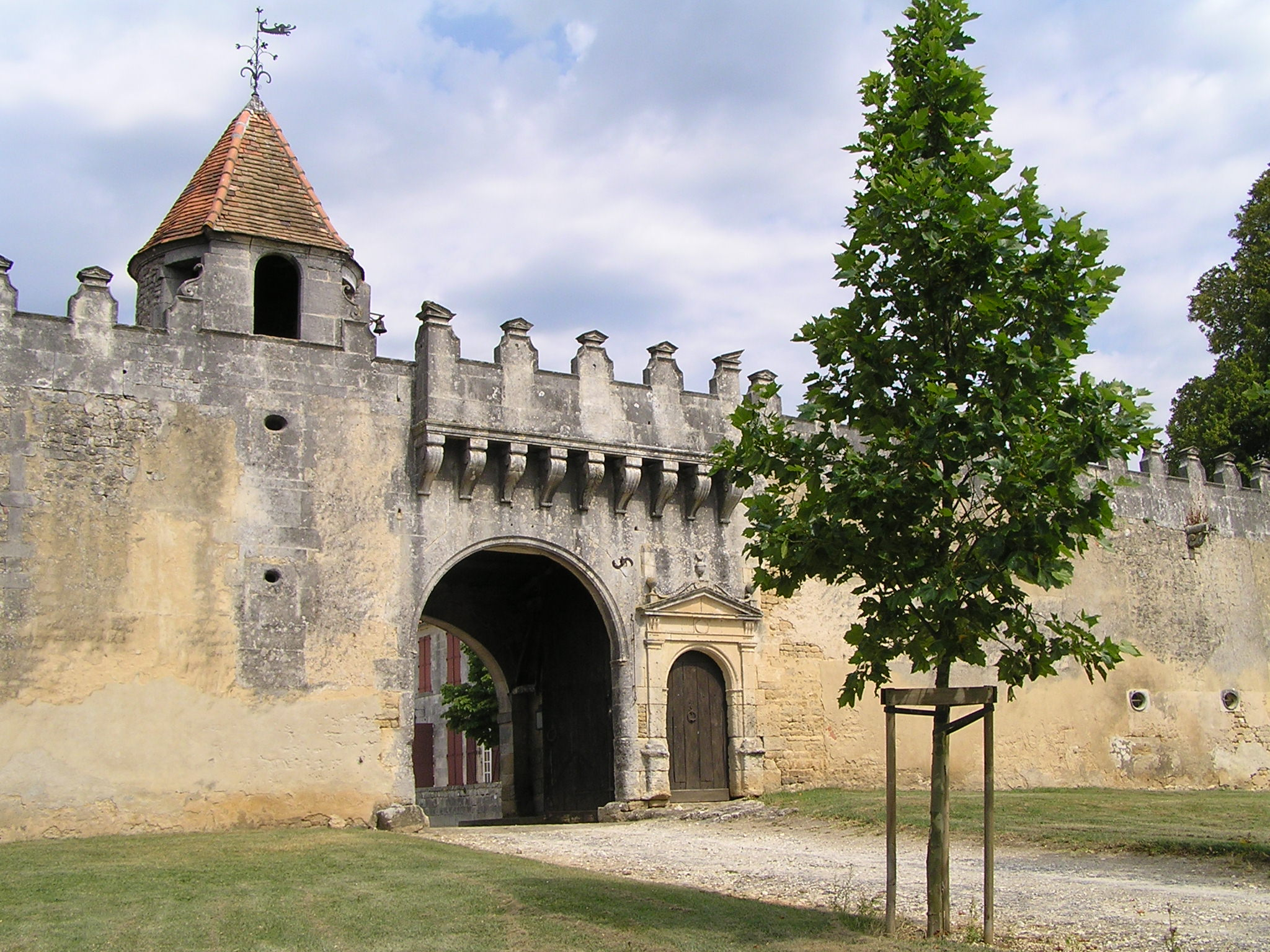
- The chateau in Saint-Brice

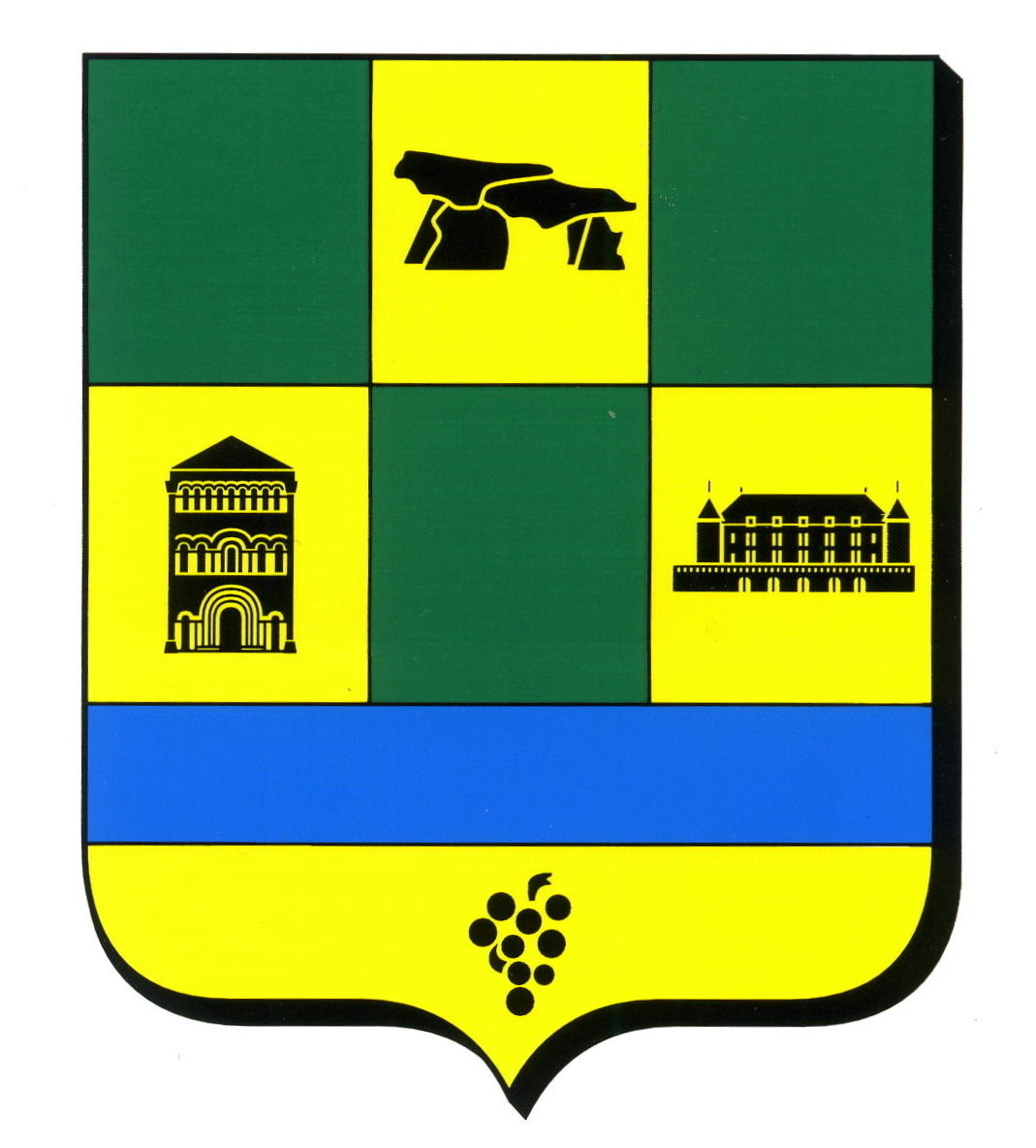
- Coat of arms
- Location of Saint-Brice
- Location within France Location within Nouvelle-Aquitaine
- Coordinates: 45°41′20″N 0°16′34″W
- Country: France
- Region: Nouvelle-Aquitaine
- Department: Charente
- Arrondissement: Cognac
- Canton: Cognac-1
- Intercommunality: CA Grand Cognac

Government
  - Mayor (2025–2026): Philippe Birolleau
- Area^{1}: 9.30 km^{2} (3.59 sq mi)
- Elevation: 54 m (177 ft)
- Highest elevation: 55 m (180 ft)
- Lowest elevation: 5 m (16 ft)
- Population (2023): 982
  - Density: 106/km^{2} (273/sq mi)
- Time zone: UTC+01:00 (CET)
  - Summer (DST): UTC+02:00 (CEST)
- INSEE/Postal code: 16304 /16100
- ^{1} French Land Register data, which excludes lakes, ponds, glaciers > 1 km^{2} (0.386 sq mi or 247 acres) and river estuaries.

Saint-Brice (French pronunciation: [sɛ̃ bʁis]) is a commune in the Charente department in southwestern France. It is named after Saint Brice of Tours.

== Population ==
Historical population
Year	Pop.	±% p.a.
1968	778	—
1975	950	+2.89%
1982	963	+0.19%
1990	1,002	+0.50%
1999	969	−0.37%
2007	1,072	+1.27%
2012	980	−1.78%
2017	965	−0.31%
2023	982	+0.29%
Source: INSEE

== Personalities ==
- Kilian Hennessy - Patriarch of the Hennessy cognac house

== Twin towns ==
- Radda in Chianti, Italy

== See also ==
- Communes of the Charente department
