= Patrick Hennessy =

Patrick Hennessy may refer to:

- Sir Patrick Hennessy (industrialist) (1898–1981), Irish-born British industrialist
- Patrick Hennessy (journalist) (born 1963), British journalist
- Patrick Hennessy (painter) (1915–1980), Irish artist
- Patrick Hennessey (trade unionist), Irish trade unionist and political radical
- Patrick Hennessey (barrister) (born 1982), British barrister and author

== See also ==
- Hennessy (surname)
- Hennessey (disambiguation)
