= Jack Hennessy =

Jack Hennessy may refer to:

- John Francis Hennessy (1853–1924), Australian architect
- John Francis (Jack) Hennessy (1887–1955), his son, Australian architect
- John M. Hennessy, American financier and philanthropist
- Jack Hennessy (politician) (1951–2024), member of the Connecticut House of Representatives

== See also ==
- Jackie Hennessy, Irish footballer
- John Hennessy (disambiguation)
