= Martell (cognac) =

Brand of cognac

- Founded: 1715; 311 years ago
- Founder: Jean Martell
- Headquarters: Cognac, France
- Products: Cognac
- Revenue: ▲€873.9 million (2022)
- Owner: Pernod Ricard
- Website: martell.com

Martell is a cognac house founded in 1715 by Jean Martell. It is the oldest of the "big four" cognac houses (the others are Hennessy, Rémy Martin and Courvoisier), who together produce most of the world's cognac. Formerly owned by the Seagram spirits empire, it is now part of the Martell Mumm Perrier-Jouët (MMPJ) subsidiary of the French wines and spirits conglomerate Pernod Ricard. Martell's flagship Cordon Bleu, introduced in 1912, was for many years the world's highest-selling premium cognac.

By 2015 Martell was producing around 14 million bottles of its cognacs a year, making it the world's second-largest cognac producer behind Hennessy.

== History ==
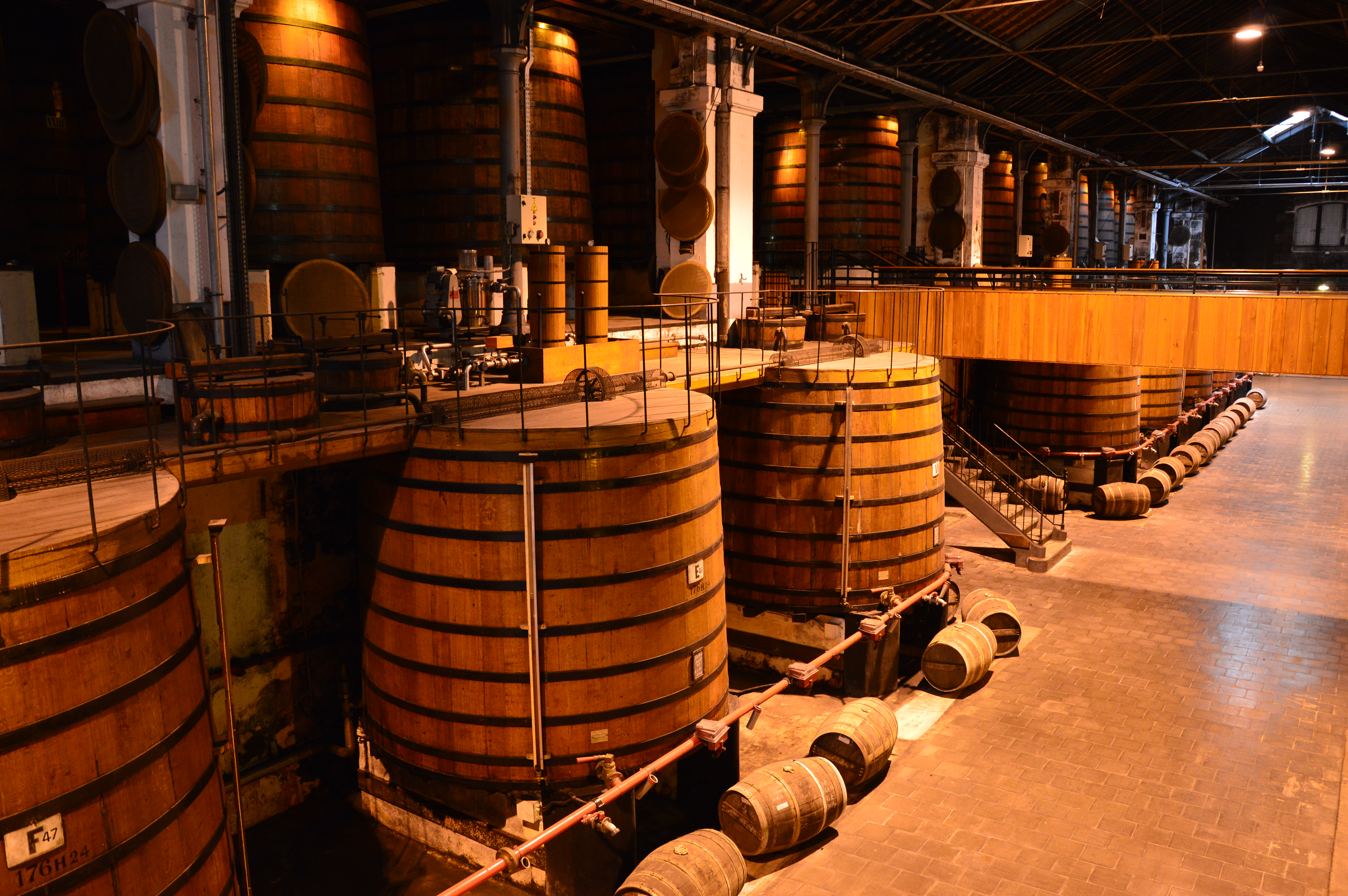
House and distillery of Martell

Jean Martell, a young merchant, was born on the island of Jersey in 1694. It was then a location known for smuggling, which may have led to his involvement in the liquor trade. In 1715 he began his own trading business at Gatebourse in Cognac, on the banks of the Charente, and thus founded one of the first cognac houses. Variations of the logo he chose, a swift in combination with the Martell family coat of arms, have been in use ever since.

Martell used grapes from the vineyards in the Borderie subregion for his eaux-de-vie, and Tronçais oak for its casks, a combination that resulted in an exceptionally smooth cognac. After Martell's death in 1753, his widow and then his two sons and grandson continued this tradition. They also developed an export business, and by 1814 Martell was the most consumed brandy in England. In 1831, Martell created its first V.S.O.P. cognac. The use of English-language designations like "very superior old pale" and "extra old" reflected aged cognac's status as primarily an export product.

In 1795 a marriage between the Hennessy and Martell families cemented a strategic alliance that created an effective duopoly in the cognac market. Another marriage followed in 1865. While still in competition, the two companies also made joint decisions, for example introducing the star grading system at the same time. This semi-formal relationship was dissolved in 1947 after the death of Maurice Firino-Martell.

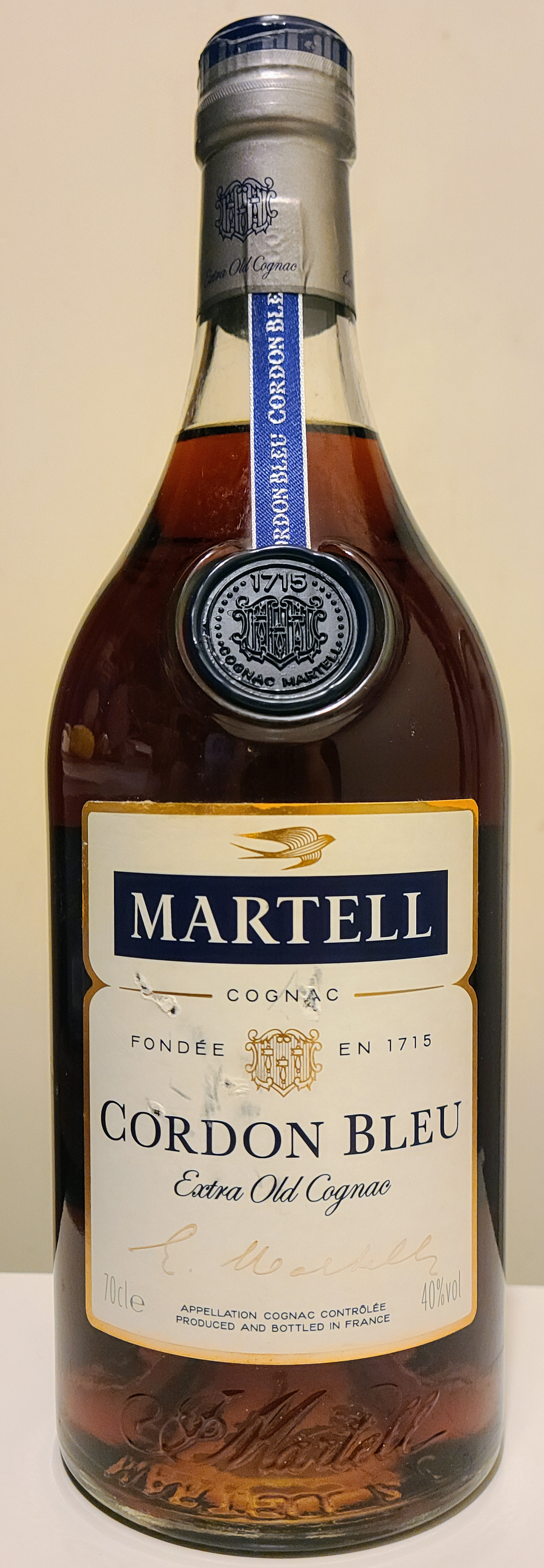
Cordon Bleu

In 1912 the marque launched Martell Cordon Bleu at the Hôtel de Paris, its first post-phylloxera cognac. While sold without designation (Martell XO is a distinct product), it is regarded as the oldest XO equivalent cognac still in production, and is widely credited as the first mass-market premium cognac. Martell Cordon Bleu was served at the coronation of George V, on the maiden voyage of the RMS Queen Mary, and on board the Concorde.

In 1987, Seagram took control of Martell in a deal worth around $600 million, reportedly attracted by cognac's high profit margin. According to the Wall Street Journal, Seagram largely neglected the brand, and while other cognac producers experienced a boom in the 1990s, driven by increased consumption among African Americans, Martell's sales declined. By 1998 it was selling less cognac in the United States than all of the other big four producers.

Seagram was broken up in 2001, and Martell was acquired by Pernod Ricard. Pernod repositioned the brand, making efforts to attract new consumers with multiple new product lines: Martell XO (released 2005), Martell Création Grand Extra (released 2007, in a bottle designed by the artist and glass designer Serge Mansau), L'Or de Jean Martell (released 2009). In 2011 the marque Martell expanded into an "ultra-prestige" range with Martell Chanteloup Perspective, a tribute to the know-how of the cellar masters and to the Domaine de Chanteloup.

In 2006, Martell joined the Comité Colbert, an association that promotes French luxury houses on an international scale.

In 2010, Martell renewed its sponsorship with the Palace of Versailles, which began in 2007, by supporting the restoration of the Queen's antechamber.

== Products ==
Map of the Cognac region

Martell selects crus from the Cognac region: Les Borderies, Grande Champagne, Petite Champagne and Fins Bois.

- Martell VSOP Médaillon
- Martell Noblige Cognac
- Martell Cordon Bleu
- Martell XO
- Martell Chanteloup
- Martell Création
- Martell Cohiba
- Martell L’Or de Jean
- Martell Blue Swift

== Marketing ==
Martell sponsored the Grand National horse race between 1992 and 2004.

Like its chief rival Hennessy, Martell has targeted African American consumers in the United States. In 2022, it teamed with Janelle Monáe in a campaign celebrating black mixologists.

== In popular culture ==
A bottle of Martell Cordon Bleu can be seen in the opening scene of Apocalypse Now (1979), on the bedside table of Captain Willard (played by Martin Sheen).

The "Poe Toaster" is the name given to a mysterious figure who, formerly, would visit the site of Edgar Allan Poe's original grave in Baltimore on the anniversary of the writer's death. He would pour a glass of Martell and raise a toast. He then would arrange three red roses on the monument in a distinctive configuration and depart, leaving the unfinished bottle. Several of the Martell bottles are kept at the Edgar Allan Poe House and Museum in Baltimore.

== See also ==
- Cognac
- Hennessy
- Pernod Ricard
- Cocktails made with cognac or brandy
