= William Hennessy =

William Hennessy may refer to:

- Bill Hennessy (Cork hurler) (1882–1954)
- Bill Hennessy (Kilkenny hurler) (born 1968)
- William Hennessy (violinist), Australian classical violinist
- William C. Hennessy, American civil servant and political figure
- William J. Hennessy Jr., American court sketch artist
- William John Hennessy, Irish artist
- William Maunsell Hennessy, Irish official and scholar
