= Kilian Hennessy =

French business magnate (1907–2010)

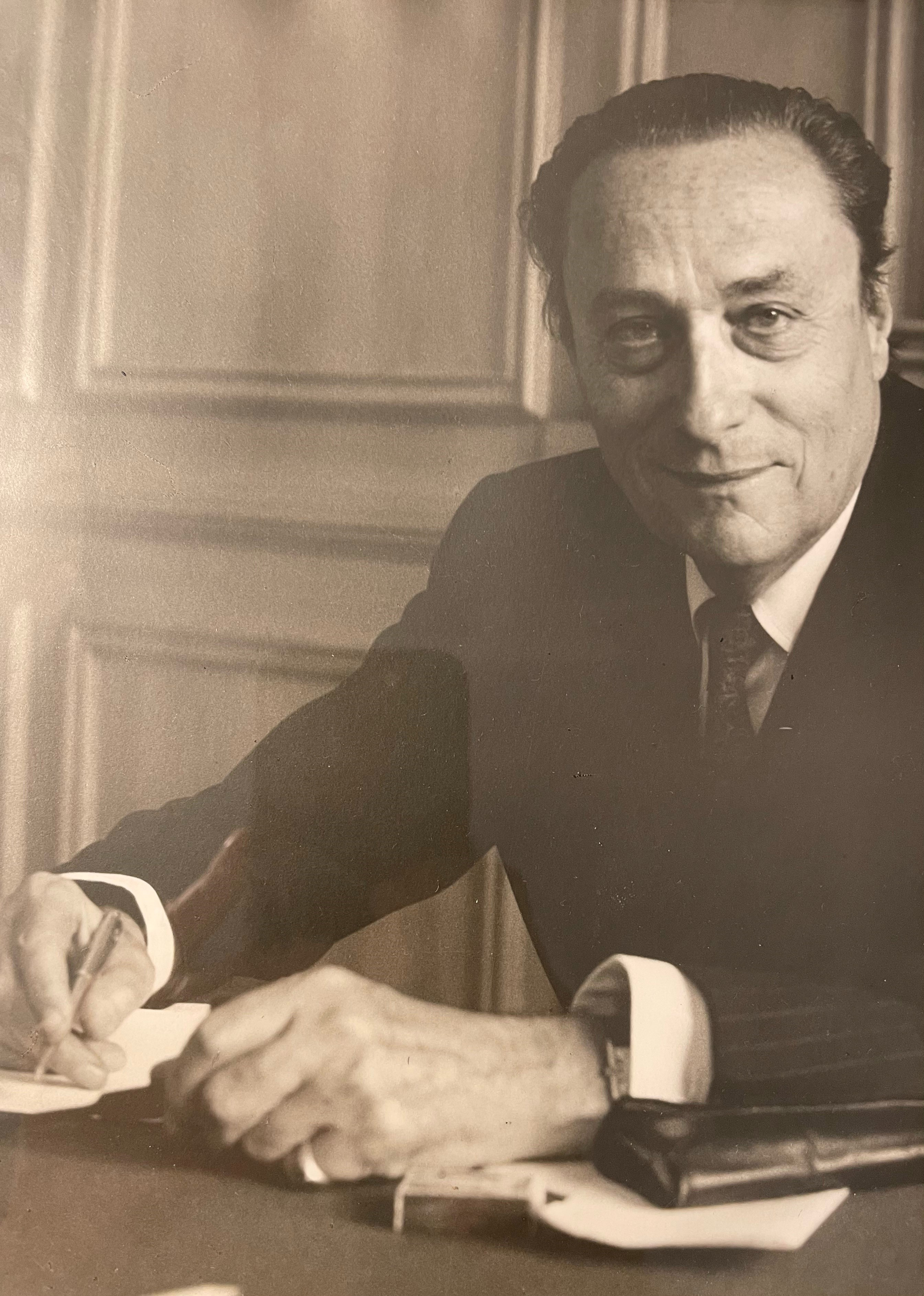

Kilian Hennessy (French pronunciation: [kiljɑ̃ ɛnɛsi]; 19 February 1907 – 1 October 2010) was a French business magnate of Irish extraction, and co-patriarch, with his first cousin Maurice, of the Hennessy cognac company.

Kilian Hennessy, the son of Jean Hennessy and Marguerite de Mun, was a direct, fifth-generation descendant of Richard Hennessy, who founded Hennessy in 1765. He became the CEO of Hennessy during the 1970s and spearheaded the 1971 merger with the Moët et Chandon champagne company. The merger resulted in the creation of Moët Hennessy, which in turn became a part of the new LVMH in 1987, becoming Moët-Hennessy • Louis Vuitton. Hennessy remained a member of the luxury group's advisory board until his death in 2010.

Hennessy's grandson, also named Kilian Henessy, founded a niche perfume line called By Kilian; in 2016, the younger Hennessy sold the line to Estée Lauder rather than LVMH.

== Death ==
Hennessy died in Switzerland on 1 October 2010, at the age of 103. He was a resident of Saint-Brice, Charente, France.
