= Hennessey Viper Venom 1000 Twin Turbo =

Overview
- Manufacturer: Hennessey
- Also called: Hennessey Venom 1000TT

Body and chassis
- Layout: FR layout
- Related: Dodge Viper

Powertrain
- Engine: 8.55 L (522 cu in) twin turbocharged V10
- Power output: 1,000 bhp (746 kW; 1,014 PS)

The Hennessey Viper Venom 1000TT (Twin Turbo) is an upgraded version of the Dodge Viper produced by Hennessey Performance Engineering, also known as HPE, that can be purchased as a complete car or as an upgrade package. The car can be had as a coupe or a convertible. It has a theoretical maximum production run of 24 vehicles.

As tested in 2006 by Motor Trend magazine, the coupe variant weighed 3,469 lb (1,574 kg), cost $187,710, and had a drag coefficient of 0.52.

== Performance ==
The Venom 1000TT is powered by an 8.5 liter V10 motor from a 2003 Viper that originally produced 368 kW (493 hp) and 525 lb⋅ft (712 N⋅m) of torque, but has been modified to produce 1,000 bhp (746 kW; 1,014 PS) and 1,100 lb⋅ft (1,491 N⋅m) of torque. The engine has been stroked from 8.3 to 8.55 liters, and has had the compression ratio lowered to 9.0:1. It also has been equipped with Twin Garrett ball bearing turbochargers and a front-mounted air-to-air intercooler.

== Body ==
- VenomAero body modifications (front air dam, rear diffuser & spoiler)
- Lowered suspension
- 2-way adjustable coilover shock absorbers
- Brembo upgraded braking system
- Adjustable traction control system
- Quaife differential
- Hennessey Venom 7R forged aluminum wheels (19x10 front, 20x13 rear)
- Michelin Pilot Sport 2 tyres: 275/30 YR19 front, 335/30 YR20 rear

== Interior ==
- Limited edition leather interior with custom embroidery
- Five-point harnesses
- HPE custom floor mats
- DVD navigation system

== Legality ==
According to testing by Motor Trend in 2005, the Venom failed California emissions testing due to excess carbon monoxide, but is legal in the other 49 states. However, the car was tuned for a standing mile race on a closed circuit, Motor Trend surprised Hennessey with this emissions test, and the car only failed by a very small threshold, which could have easily been remedied with a less aggressive tune.

== Performance ==
0-60 mph (97 km/h): 3.25 seconds

Top Speed: 255 mph (410 km/h)

Road & Track 0-200 Shootout (Sept 07) Article

- 0-200 mph: 25.3 s (street tires, not drag radials).
