= Hennessey (surname) =

Hennessey is an Irish surname, being the anglicised form of Ó hAonghusa. Families of this name were found in Kingdom of Uí Failghe and Kingdom of Desmond.

== People with the surname ==
Notable people with the surname include:

- Brad Hennessey (born 1980), baseball player
- Charlotte Hennessey (1873–1928), Canadian actress; mother of Mary Pickford (Gladys Louise Smith), Lottie Pickford and Jack Pickford
- Dan Hennessey (1942–2024), American-Canadian voice actor
- Dorothy Hennessey (1913–2008), Roman Catholic religious sister and activist
- Erin Hennessey (born 1976), American politician from New Hampshire
- Gwen Hennessey (born 1932), Roman Catholic religious sister and activist
- John Hennessey, founder of Hennessey Performance Engineering
- Keith Hennessey, director of the U.S. National Economic Council
- Martha Hennessey (born 1954), American politician from New Hampshire
- Terry Hennessey (1942–2025), Welsh footballer
- Wayne Hennessey (born 1987), Welsh footballer

== Fictional characters with the surname ==
- Alistair Hennessey, fictional rival to the eponymous character of The Life Aquatic with Steve Zissou

== See also ==
- Hennessy (surname)
