= Bill Hennessy =

Bill Hennessy may refer to:

- Bill Hennessy (Cork hurler) (1882–1954)
- Bill Hennessy (Kilkenny hurler) (born 1968)
