= Hennessey Venom F5 =

American sports car

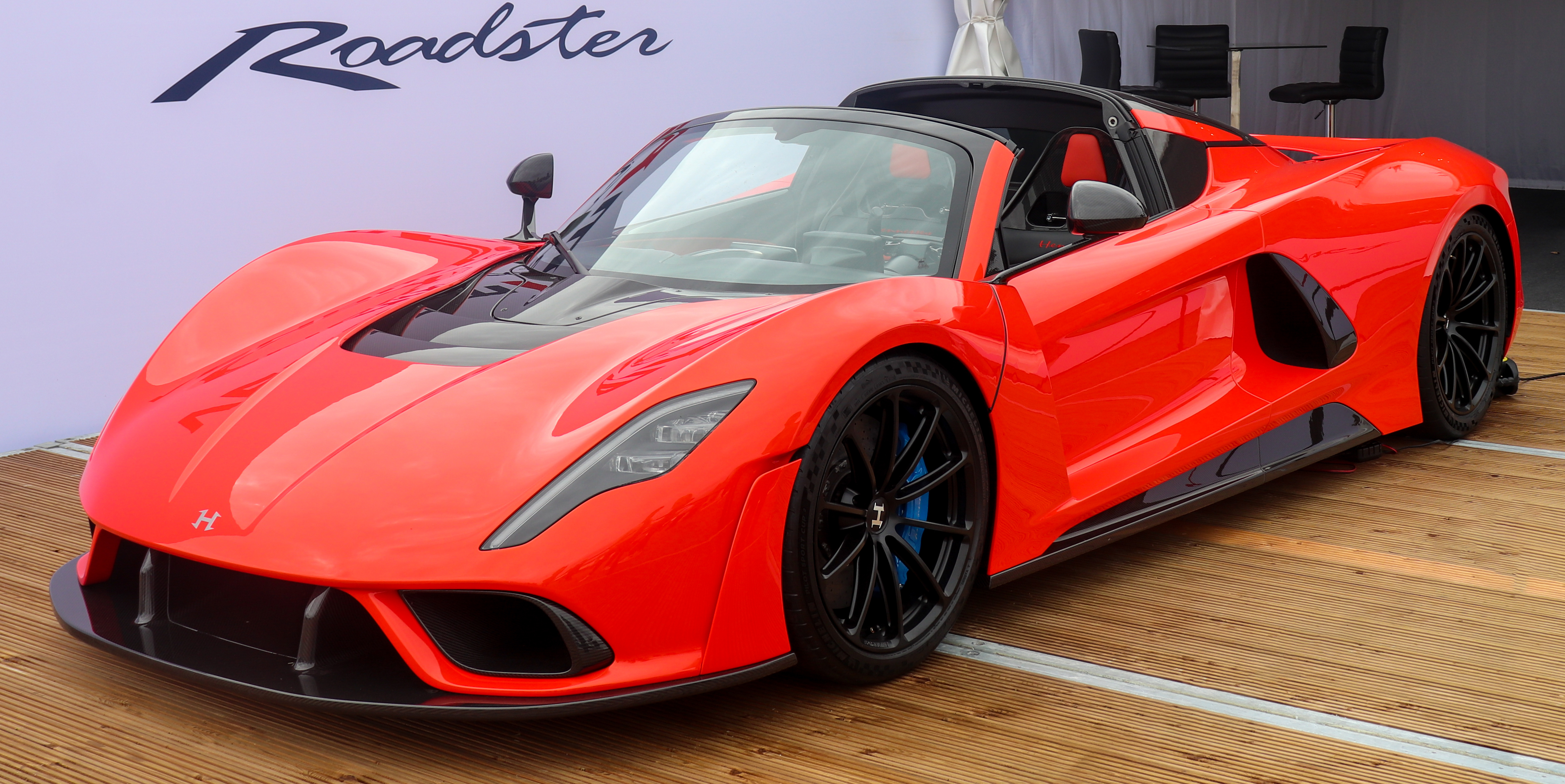

Overview
- Manufacturer: Hennessey Special Vehicles
- Production: 2020–present
- Model years: 2021–present
- Assembly: Sealy, Texas, U.S. (Hennessey Performance Engineering)
- Designer: Nathan Malinick

Body and chassis
- Class: Sports car (S)
- Body style: 2-door coupé; 2-door roadster
- Layout: Rear mid-engine, rear-wheel-drive
- Doors: Butterfly

Powertrain
- Engine: 6.6 L Fury twin-turbocharged V8
- Power output: 1,817 hp (1,842 PS; 1,355 kW) (1542 hp on 91 octane); 1,193 lb⋅ft (1,617 N⋅m); Evolution: 2,031 hp (2,059 PS; 1,515 kW); 1,445 lb⋅ft (1,959 N⋅m)
- Transmission: 7-speed CIMA single-clutch automated manual; 6-speed gated manual (F5-M Roadster, F5 Revolution LF)

Dimensions
- Wheelbase: 110.2 in (2,799 mm)
- Length: 183.7 in (4,666 mm)
- Width: 77.1 in (1,958 mm)
- Height: 44.5 in (1,130 mm)
- Curb weight: 3,053 lb (1,385 kg)

Chronology
- Predecessor: Hennessey Venom GT
- Successor: Hennessey Blackbird

The Hennessey Venom F5 is a sports car developed and manufactured by the American vehicle-manufacturing company Hennessey Special Vehicles which was established in 2017. Contracted with Delta Motorsport of Silverstone, England for the development of the vehicle, this is Hennessey's first all new proprietary vehicle as an accredited titled manufacturer. The F5 name is a reference to the highest rating on the Fujita scale: F5, designated to tornadoes that have attained wind speeds as high as 261–318 mph (420–512 km/h).

Hennessey aims to reach top speeds in excess of 311 mph (500 km/h) to attain the title of world's fastest production car.

== Initial release ==
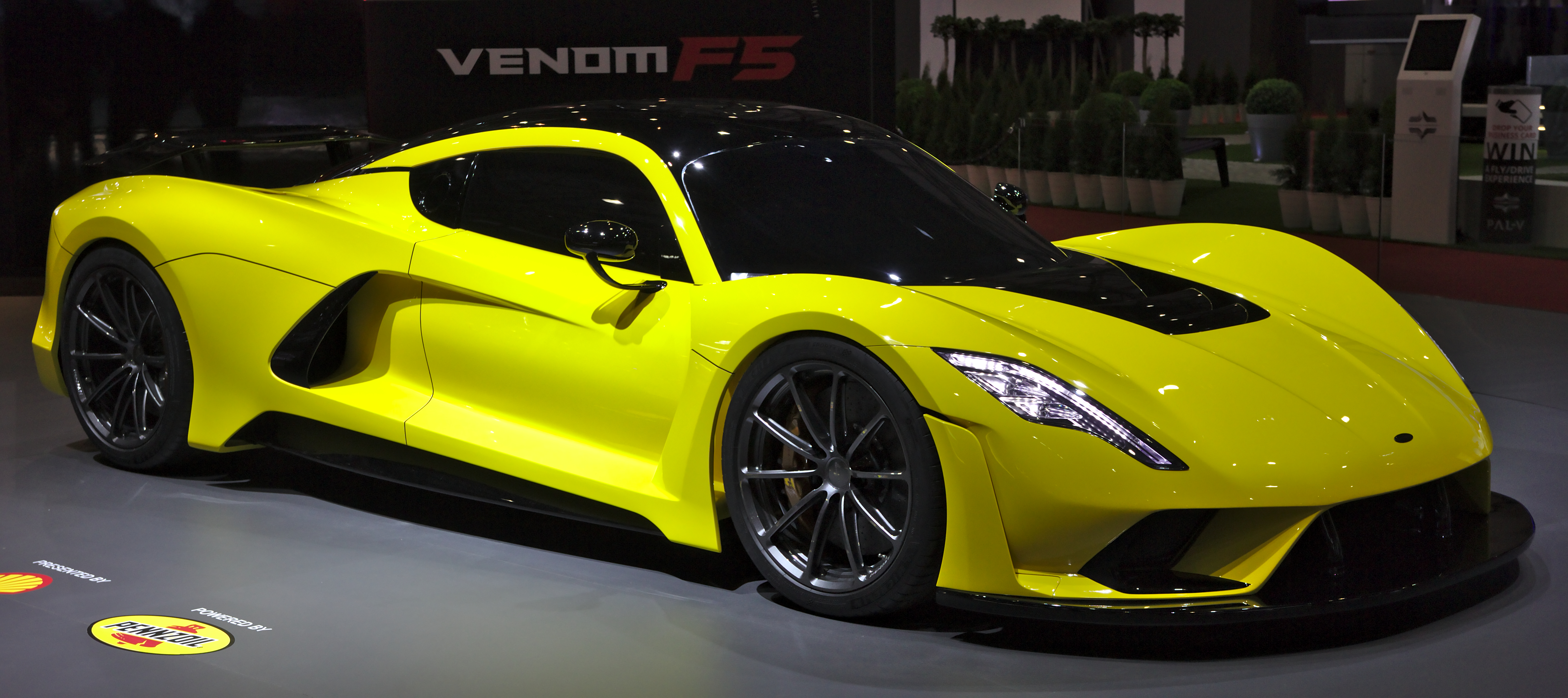
Concept model

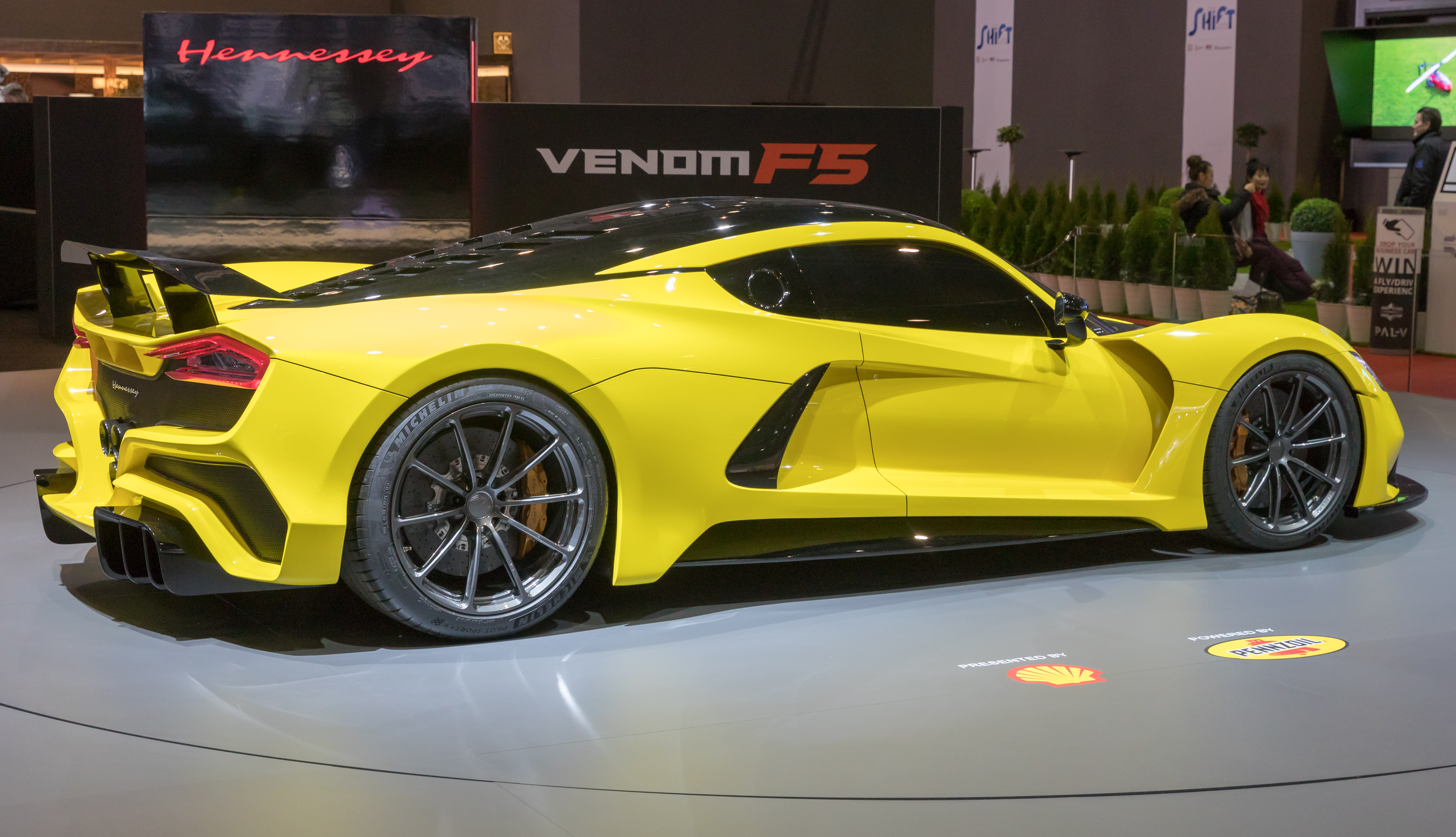
Concept model rear

The Hennessey Venom F5 was first revealed in August 2014. Subsequently, it was shown as an exterior mock-up at the American SEMA Show in Las Vegas on November 1, 2017. This concept model had three exhausts and active aero, which was later changed. This model did not contain an engine or an interior.

== Specifications ==
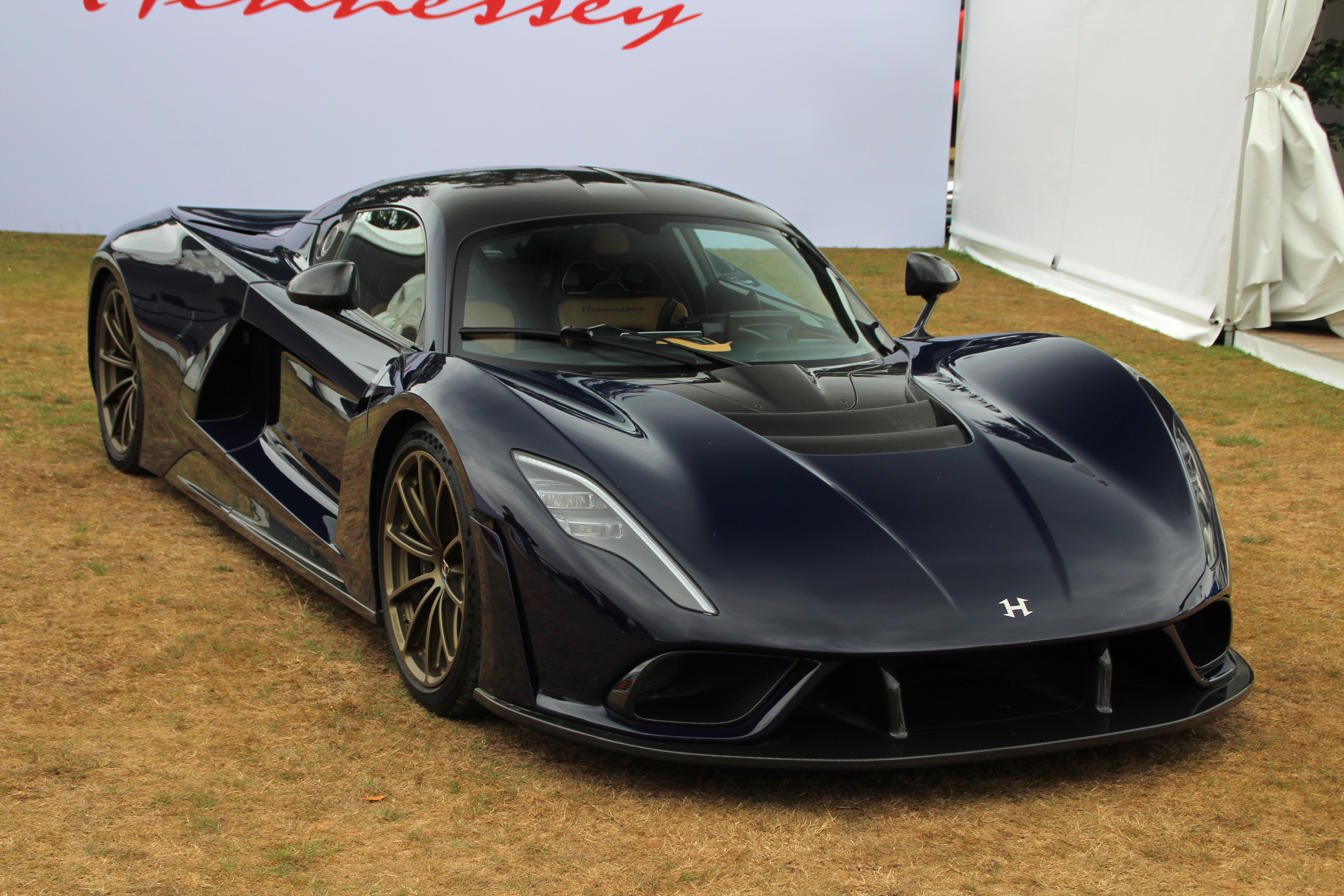

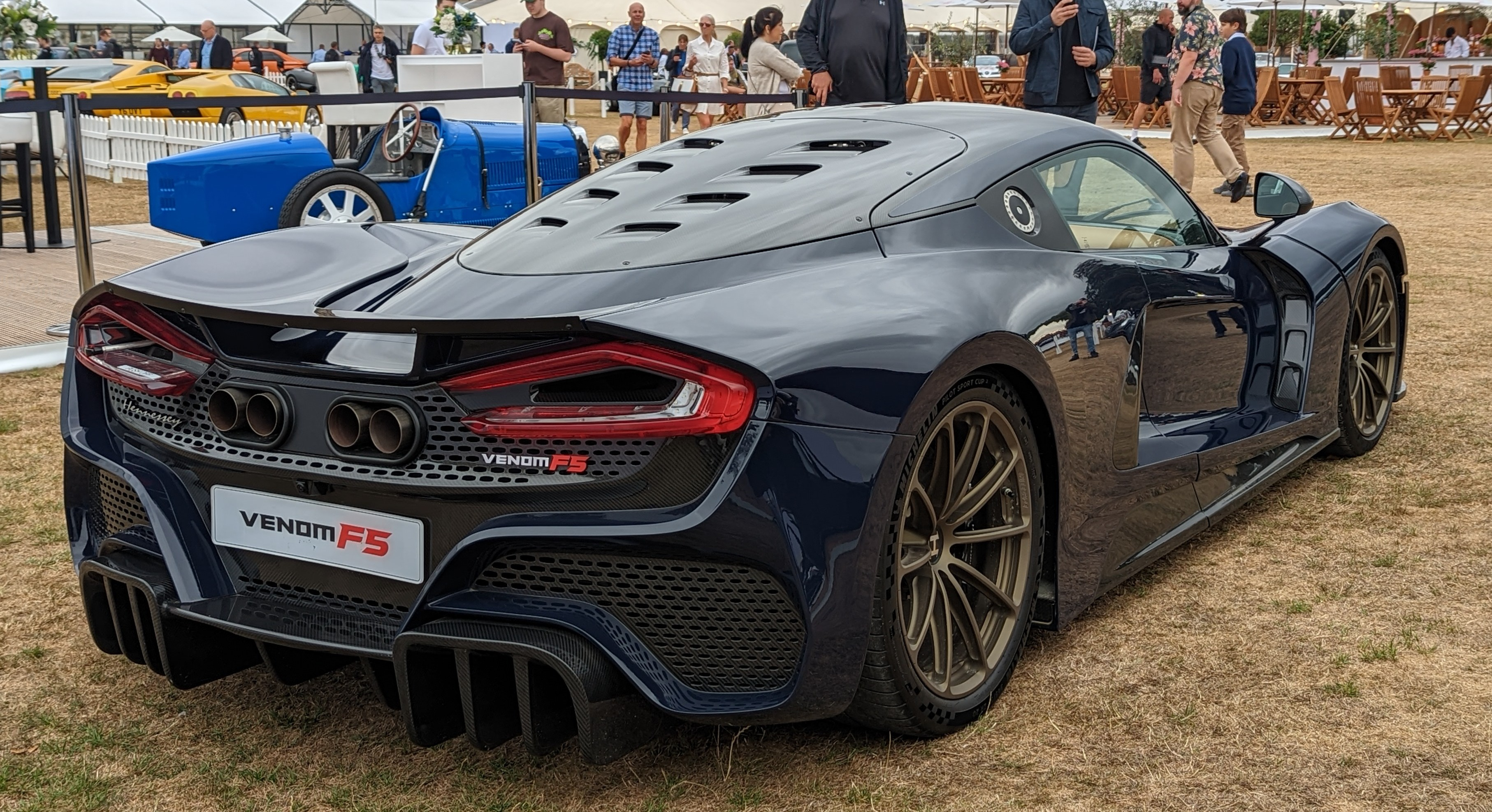
2022 Venom F5

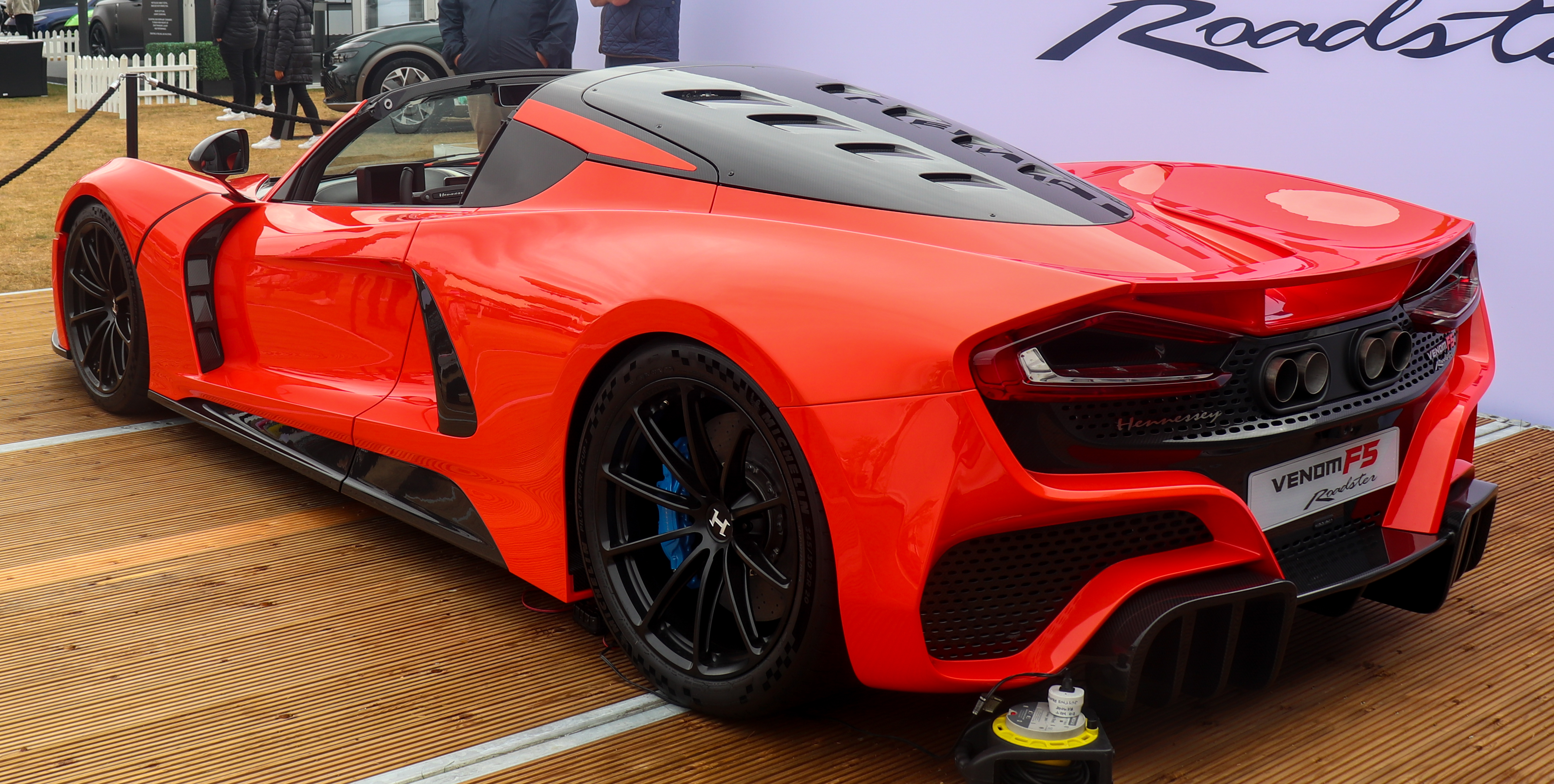
2022 Venom F5 Roadster

The engine used in the Venom F5 is the Fury designed and manufactured by Hennessey. The Fury is a twin-turbo 6.6 L V8, that produces up to 1,817 hp (1,842 PS; 1,355 kW) and 1,193 lb⋅ft (1,617 N⋅m). In April 2025, Hennessey released the Evolution package, costing an extra $285,000, which increases the power output to 2,031 hp (2,059 PS; 1,515 kW) by using E85 fuel. Cars fitted with this upgrade are claimed to be capable of accelerating from 0–200 mph (0–322 km/h) in 10.3 seconds.

Costruzione Italiana Macchine Attrezzi provides the available 7-speed single-clutch automated manual transmission with paddle-shifters and the limited-slip differential sending power to the rear wheels, making the car rear-wheel drive.

The chassis and body is made almost entirely of carbon fiber. Active aerodynamics are removed in the production car, replaced with a smaller fixed spoiler. The three exhausts in the concept model was changed to four exhausts. The car's weight reportedly stands at 2,950 lb (1,338 kg) with fluids, setting the power-to-weight ratio at 1,358 hp per ton. Because of the use of active aerodynamics and a sleek, new design in the concept model, the car has an estimated drag coefficient of Cd=0.33. The production variant is claimed to have an increased drag coefficient of Cd=0.39.

According to Hennessey, great emphasis was placed on interior space, quality and comfort, so that despite offering high performance, the vehicle would still offer a spacious and comfortable interior experience that can accommodate tall and large drivers and passengers. It was mentioned that an undisclosed NFL player, who has only been described as being 6'7" tall, has placed an order for one of the first models once full production has commenced.

Each Venom F5 comes with the "Treasure Chest", a giant aluminum box containing the key fob, a magnetic trickle charger, and a tow hook. The key fob's serial number plate is made from a metal component that was disposed from a Space Shuttle launch. Company founder John Hennessey was given the component by an astronaut and broke it into pieces to give Venom F5 owners "a piece of space".

== Production ==
The first production was limited to 24 units, 12 of which were already sold by December 2020. The price of the car in the United States was initially US$1.6 million, but later increased to US$2.1 million for the remaining 12 units. Eight cars are planned to be built and delivered in 2021. In August 2021 the company officially announced that it had customer orders for and had sold all planned 24 units of the F5.

The Hennessey Venom F5 Revolution was limited to 36 units, consisting of 24 Coupes and 12 Roadsters; Hennessey has stated that the Roadster allocations are sold out already. The Revolution variant undergoes extensive re-engineering for improved track capability, including revised aerodynamics, retuned suspension, lightweight wheels, a roof-mounted air intake, and onboard digital telemetry. With an approximate price of $2.7 million, the model focuses on enhanced handling and weight reduction compared to the standard Venom F5.

Development of the Venom F5 Revolution was led by John “Heinrocket” Heinricy, Hennessey's Chief Engineer and former General Motors performance specialist known for the Cadillac CTS-V and Chevrolet Corvette Z06. Heinricy stated that designing the Revolution surpassed his prior engineering projects, emphasizing its ultra-lightweight construction and extreme power. Hennessey's Maverick division built a one-of-one edition called the Venom F5 Revolution LF.

In April 2025 Hennessey revealed the 2,031 hp (1,515 kW) Venom F5 Evolution model.

== World record ==
On July 30, 2024, the Venom F5 broke the standing 1/2 mile (805 m) record for production cars with a time of 14.44 seconds at 219 mph (353 km/h). This record was set in Florida, United States driven by John Hennessey.

Record	Time
1/8 mile (201 m)	6.77 seconds at 121 mph (195 km/h)
1/4 mile (402 m)	9.82 seconds at 169 mph (272 km/h)
1/2 mile (804 m)	14.44 seconds at 219 mph (353 km/h)

== See also ==
- List of production cars by power output
