= Hennessey Venom GT =

American high performance sports car

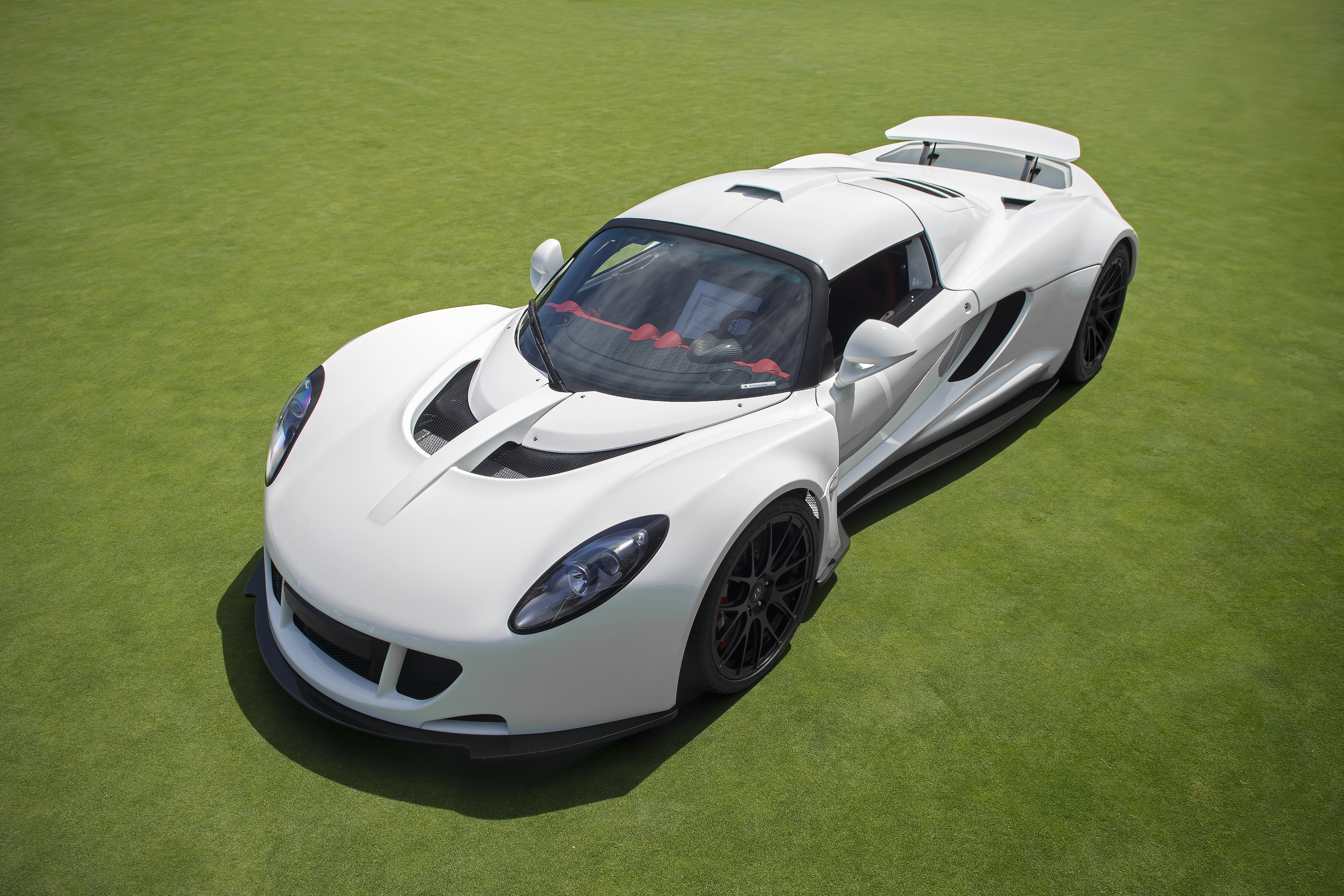

Overview
- Manufacturer: Hennessey Performance Engineering
- Production: 2010–2014; 8 units (4 Coupes (Counting the Prototype) and 4 Spyders)
- Model years: 2010–2014
- Assembly: Hethel, England (chassis components); Sealy, Texas, United States
- Designer: Steve Everitt

Body and chassis
- Class: Sports car (S)
- Body style: 2-door coupe; 2-door roadster (Spyder)
- Layout: Longitudinal rear mid-engine rear-wheel-drive
- Related: Lotus Elise; Lotus Exige

Powertrain
- Engine: 427 cu in (7.0 L) twin-turbocharged LS7 V8
- Transmission: 6-speed Ricardo manual

Dimensions
- Wheelbase: 110.2 in (2,799 mm)
- Length: 183.7 in (4,666 mm)
- Width: 77.2 in (1,961 mm)
- Height: 44.7 in (1,135 mm)
- Curb weight: 2,743 lb (1,244 kg) (Coupe); 2,773 lb (1,258 kg) (Spyder)

Chronology
- Successor: Hennessey Venom F5

The Hennessey Venom GT is a high performance sports car manufactured by US manufacturer Hennessey Performance Engineering. The Venom GT is based on the Lotus Elise/Exige.

== Specifications ==
=== Chassis ===
The Venom GT has a heavily modified Lotus Elise/Exige chassis. The Venom GT retains many Elise components including the roof, doors, side glass, windscreen, cockpit, floorpan, HVAC system, wiper and head lamps, although the manufacturer is not associated with Lotus Cars. For road use the car is registered as a Lotus Exige (modified) and is not a series production car.

The Venom GT has a curb weight of 2,743 lb (1,244 kg) aided by carbon fiber bodywork and carbon fiber wheels. The brakes have Brembo 6-piston calipers at the front and 4-piston calipers at the rear. The rotors are 15 in (380 mm) carbon ceramic units provided by Surface Transforms.

=== Drivetrain ===
The Venom GT is powered by a twin-turbocharged 376 cu in (6.2 L) GM LS9 V8 engine or 427 cu in (7.0 L) GM LSX V8 engine in either supercharged or twin-turbo-charged specification. The LS9 architecture incorporates specific design features such as reinforced internal components and additional head bolts with aluminum heads including twin Precision dual ball bearing turbochargers. The engine in twin-turbocharged specification has a power output of 1,244 hp (928 kW; 1,261 PS) at 6,600 rpm and 1,155 lb⋅ft (1,566 N⋅m) of torque at 4,400 rpm. Engine power output is adjustable by three settings: 800 hp (597 kW; 811 PS), 1,000 hp (746 kW; 1,014 PS) and 1,200 hp (895 kW; 1,217 PS). The engine has a redline of 7,200 rpm.

The mid-mounted engine is connected to the rear wheels by a Ricardo 6-speed manual transmission, as used in the Ford GT.

A programmable traction control system manages power output. Computational fluid dynamics tested bodywork and downforce also help keep the car stable. Under varying conditions on both the road and racetrack, an active aero system with adjustable rear wing will deploy. An adjustable suspension system allows ride height adjustments by 2.4 in (61 mm) according to speed and driving conditions. The car is fitted with Michelin Pilot Sport 2 tires.

The Venom GT was not produced to one completely fixed specification. The cars evolved throughout the program, with changes to the engine, aerodynamics, bodywork, structural components, exhaust system, and other areas appearing as development continued.

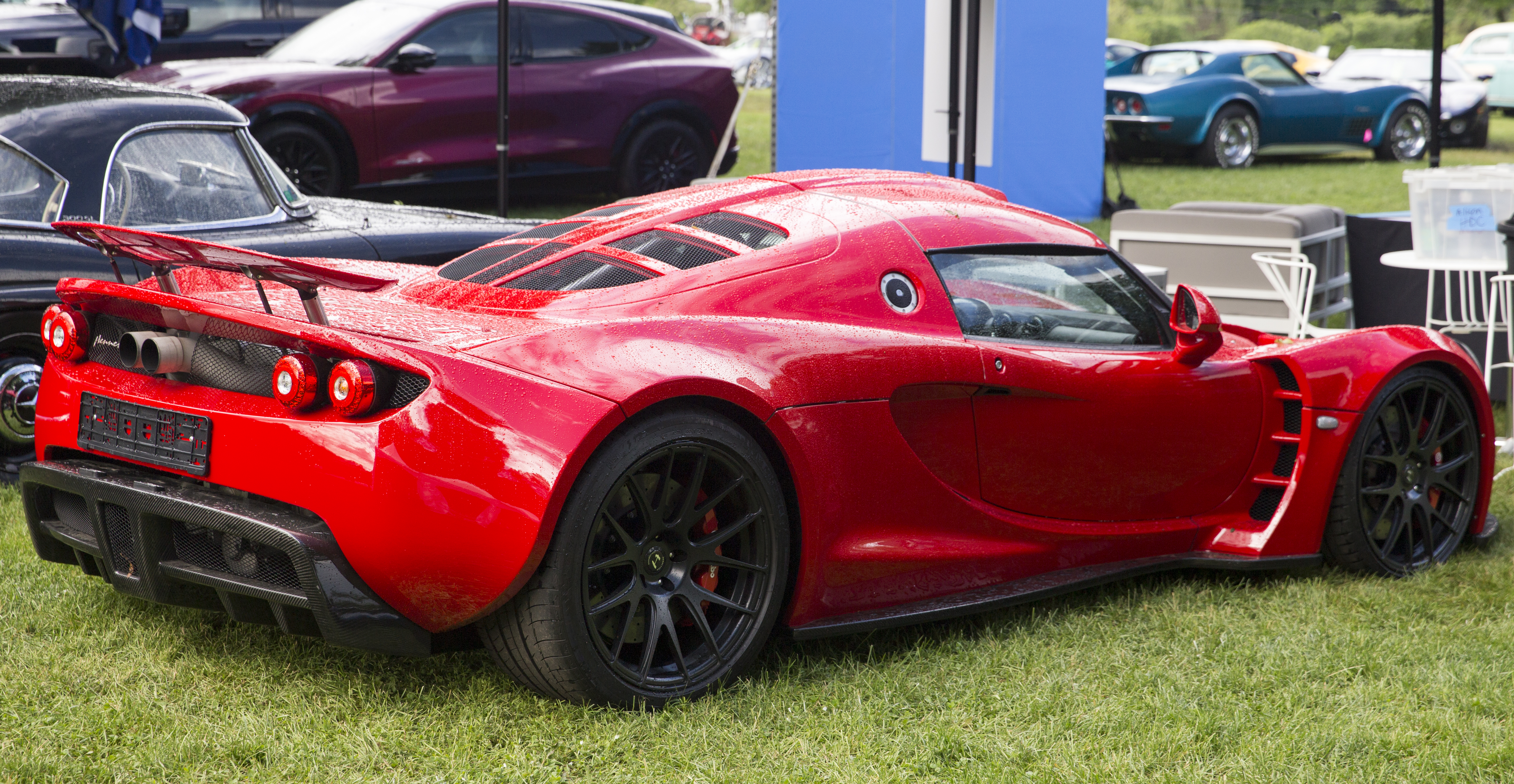
Rear view

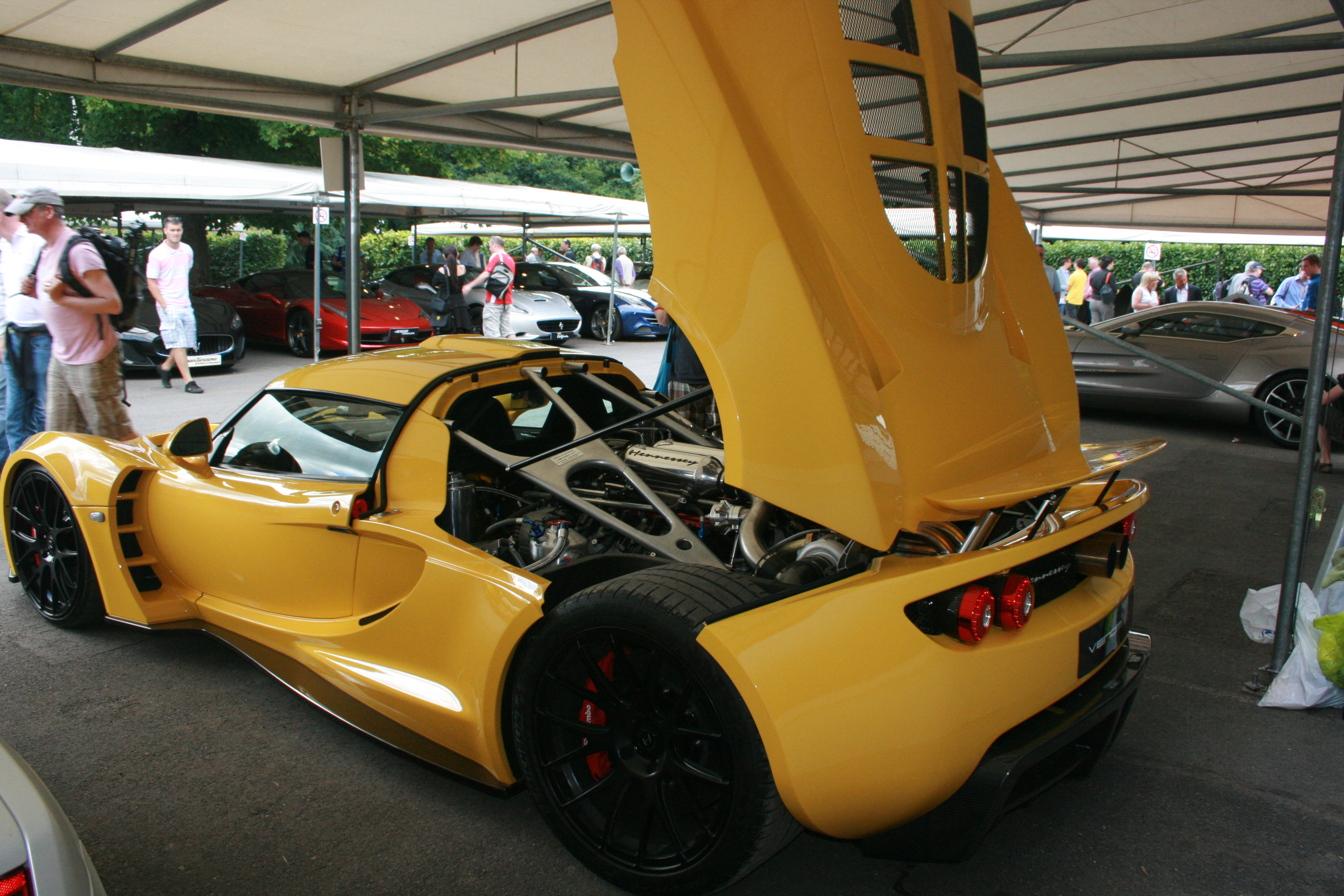
Rear view with engine displayed

=== Speed records ===
On January 21, 2013, the Venom GT set a Guinness World Record for the fastest road legal car from 0–186 mph (0–300 km/h) with an average acceleration time of 13.63 seconds. In addition, the car set an unofficial record for 0–200 mph (0–322 km/h) acceleration at 14.51 seconds, beating the Koenigsegg Agera R's time of 17.68 seconds, making it the unofficial fastest accelerating road legal car in the world.

On April 3, 2013, the Hennessey Venom GT reached 265.7 mph (427.6 km/h) over 2 miles (3.2 km) during testing at United States Naval Air Station Lemoore California. Hennessey used two VBOX 3i data logging systems to document the run and had VBOX officials on hand to certify the numbers.

On February 14, 2014, on the Kennedy Space Center's 3.22-mile (5.2 km) shuttle landing strip in Florida, the Hennessey team recorded a top speed of 270.49 mph (435.31 km/h) in a limited distance of 2.3 miles (3.7 km) with the Director of Miller Motorsport Park, Brian Smith, driving. As the run was in a single direction, and only 29 cars were produced (to qualify for Guinness World Records a minimum of 30 cars are required to be produced), it does not qualify as the world's fastest production car in the Guinness Book of Records.

On March 25, 2016 the Hennessey Venom GT Spyder recorded a top speed of 265.57 mph (427.4 km/h) at Naval Air Station Lemoore, celebrating Hennessey's 25th anniversary. As with previous speed tests, the run was independently verified by Racelogic as World Fastest road legal open-top sports car. In May, 2016, the Hennessey Team revealed that the car was about 300 hp (224 kW) down on power due to issues with one of the car's three high capacity fuel pumps. Normally, the forced induction 7.0-liter V8 engine in the Venom GT Spyder generates 1,451 hp (1,082 kW; 1,471 PS) and 1,287 lb⋅ft (1,745 N⋅m) of torque.

== Venom GT Spyder ==
The Venom GT Spyder is an open top version of the Venom GT. Having decided to order a Venom GT, Aerosmith lead singer Steven Tyler approached Hennessey in mid-late 2011 and asked if an open-top version could be created. This involved structural changes which added 30 lb (14 kg) to the curb weight. Tyler's was the first of five cars scheduled for the 2013 model year. The car was later put up for auction on January 20, 2017 and was sold by Barrett-Jackson in Scottsdale, Arizona for US$800,000.

For the 2016 model year, the Spyder gained 207 hp (154 kW) for a total of 1,451 hp (1,082 kW).

The production of the Spyder was supposed to be limited to five units with a one-off Spyder being produced as the "Final edition" model. Ultimately only 4 Spyders were completed, with the last 3 not officially being named as spyders, but do feature the structural reinforcements to allow it.

== Venom GT "World's Fastest Edition" (2014) ==
The Venom GT "World's Fastest Edition" is a version of the Venom GT coupe limited to 3 units. The model commemorates the Venom GT coupe's 0–300 km/h Guinness World Record.

The vehicle went on sale for US$1.25 million. All three units were reportedly sold to customers shortly after their production was announced by the manufacturer. However, none of the cars were built.

== Venom GT "Final Edition" (2017) ==
A single unit of the Venom GT Spyder, called the Final Edition, was produced to commemorate the car's six year production run and to mark an end to the production of the Venom GT. The engine output is the same but the curb weight has been decreased by 9 lb (4 kg). The car is painted "Glacier Blue" with double narrow white stripes. The vehicle was reported to be sold however the car was never built.

== Production Controversy ==
The production history of the Venom GT has been the subject of conflicting information. Contemporary Hennessey material stated that twelve road-going Venom GTs were produced alongside one prototype, for a total of thirteen vehicles. Hennessey's January 2017 announcement marking the end of production specifically described the final car as the thirteenth vehicle.

However, subsequent chassis-level research has identified seven production cars and one prototype, accounting for eight individual Venom GTs. The frequently repeated figure of thirteen therefore appears to reflect the production plan and/or historical reporting rather than thirteen individually identifiable completed cars.

Earlier Hennessey material also described plans for a considerably larger production run. In 2014, Hennessey stated that production would ultimately be limited to 29 cars, while earlier promotional material referenced substantially larger intended production numbers.

The distinction between planned production, reported production, and individually identifiable completed chassis is important when discussing the total number of Venom GTs.

== Successor ==
The Hennessey Venom GT was succeeded by the Hennessey Venom F5, which was unveiled in November 2017. Unlike its predecessor, the Venom F5 is a series production car, built completely from the ground up, including chassis and engine.
