= John Hennessey (rugby league) =

Wales international rugby league footballer

Personal information
- Full name: John Hennessey
- Born: Wales
- Died: unknown

Playing information
- Position: Second-row
Club
Years	Team	Pld	T	G	FG	P
1922–≥25	Rochdale Hornets
Representative
Years	Team	Pld	T	G	FG	P
1925	Wales	1

John Hennessey (birth unknown – death unknown) was a Welsh professional rugby league footballer who played in the 1920s. He played at representative level for Wales, and at club level for Rochdale Hornets, as a second-row.

== International honours ==
John Hennessey won a cap for Wales while at Rochdale Hornets in 1925.
