= Hennessey Blackbird =

American sports car

Overview
- Manufacturer: Hennessey Special Vehicles
- Production: 2029 (to commence); Limited to 71 units
- Model years: 2030 (planned)
- Assembly: Sealy, Texas, United States
- Designer: Nathan Malinick

Body and chassis
- Class: Sports car/grand tourer (S)
- Body style: 2-door coupé
- Layout: Rear mid-engine, rear-wheel-drive
- Doors: Gullwing

Powertrain
- Engine: 6.2 L naturally aspirated V8
- Power output: 800–850 hp (811–862 PS; 597–634 kW)
- Transmission: 6-speed manual transmission

Dimensions
- Curb weight: 3,000 lb (1,361 kg)

The Hennessey Blackbird is an upcoming mid-engine grand touring sports car developed and manufactured by American vehicle manufacturer Hennessey Special Vehicles. It is the successor to the Hennessey Venom F5 and is limited to 71 units worldwide.

== Overview ==
On June 20, 2026, Hennessey revealed a teaser image depicting a rear light. The next development project of the sports car lented, dubbed as Project Overlord. It was unveiled online on August 3, 2026, as the third production vehicle to be manufactured. The nameplate derives from the aircraft Lockheed SR-71 Blackbird; hence, it served as an inspiration for the vehicle. John Hennessey, the company founder and CEO of Hennessey Performance Engineering quoted:

“Blackbird isn’t just the next chapter in the Hennessey story, it represents the beginning of a new book. Our third hypercar, Blackbird, is unexpected by design, yet it’s exactly what I wanted to create and what our customers have been asking for. Challenging expectations has always been part of our DNA. From the beginning, Blackbird was guided by a simple idea: to deliver an analog experience where beauty and drama define every moment. This is not a numbers car. We set out to create an unparalleled emotional experience, from the first time you see it to the moment you take the wheel and feel the connection between driver and machine.”

As he stated, the Blackbird centers entirely on raw mechanical engagement and driver connection.

=== Design ===
The Blackbird features bodywork inspired by the styling of aerospace models, chine-line-like proportions, and two vertical stabilizers that serve as the spoilers. The quad exhaust arrangement is also influenced by the exhaust nozzles found on the experimental plane Bell X-1. The manufacturer claims that the vehicle will automatically deploy its spoilers, and they will pivot on a tilted angle of roughly 71 degrees upon reaching sustained speeds more than 71 mph (114 km/h).

The interior of the Blackbird features a modernized, fully analog instrument cluster, operated with various mechanical gear components to resemble an aerospace-like instrument cluster. The tachometer on the cluster incorporates a compass-like design integrated with a stylized red needle.

=== Specifications ===
The chassis and body are made entirely with carbon fiber, which is refined and slightly lighter than the predecessor. It also features an adaptive and firm suspension, ABS, traction control, NVH, six-speed manual-gated transmission and premade Michelin Pilot Sport tires.

The engine is equipped with a naturally-aspirated 6.2-liter V8 coproduced with Ilmor, providing an estimated output of 800–850 hp (811–862 PS; 597–634 kW) and revs more than 9,000 rpm. It accelerates from 0–60 mph (0–97 km/h) in 2.5 seconds, and has a claimed top speed of 220 mph (354 km/h).
