= David Hennessy (disambiguation) =

David Hennessy (1858–1890) was an American policeman and detective, police chief of New Orleans 1888–1890.

David Hennessy may also refer to:

- David Hennessy, 3rd Baron Windlesham (1932–2010), British politician and professor
- John David Hennessey (1847–1935), also known as David Hennessey, British-born journalist and author
- David Valentine Hennessy (1858–1923), Australian politician, lord mayor of Melbourne
