= Patrick Hennessey (trade unionist) =

Irish trade unionist

Patrick Hennessey was an Irish trade unionist and political radical. He was President of the Land and Labour League, 1869–1873, subsequently establishing the Metropolitan Home Rule Association and participating in the formation of the East End-based Labour Protection League.
