= Bill Hennessy (Cork hurler) =

Irish hurler

Personal information
- Native name: Liam Ó hAonasa (Irish)
- Born: 13 February 1882 Castlemartyr, County Cork, Ireland
- Died: 21 November 1954 (aged 72) Castlemartyr, County Cork, Ireland
- Occupation: Merchant

Sport
- Sport: Hurling
- Position: Forward
Club
- Years: Club
- Dungourney
Club titles
- Cork titles: 2
Inter-county
- Years: County
- 1902-1912: Cork
Inter-county titles
- Munster titles: 6
- All-Irelands: 2

William F. Hennessy (13 February 1882 – 21 November 1954) was an Irish hurler. His career included County Championship success with Dungourney and All-Ireland Championship titles with the Cork senior hurling team.

== Honours ==
Dungourney

- Cork Senior Hurling Championship (2): 1907, 1909

Cork

- All-Ireland Senior Hurling Championship (2): 1902, 1903
- Munster Senior Hurling Championship (5): 1903, 1904, 1905, 1907, 1912
