= John M. Hennessy =

American financier and philanthropist

John M. (Jack) Hennessy is an American financier and philanthropist. The son of John F. Hennessy and Octavia Tanksley, he was born on May 5, 1936, in Boston, Massachusetts.

He was educated at the Roxbury Latin School, Harvard University (where he graduated magna cum laude), and the MIT Sloan School of Management. He and his wife, Margarita, divide their time among Nassau, Bahamas, London, England, where their daughter and son-in-law live, and Tuxedo Park, New York, where their son, daughter-in-law, and three grandchildren live.

== Career ==
=== Citibank ===
After college in 1958, Hennessy joined The First National Citibank, working in New York and South America. He eventually became the head of the bank's West Coast of S.A. operations centered in Lima, Peru at the age of 28.

=== The U.S. Treasury ===
After returning to school at MIT for two years, in September 1970, Hennessy joined the United States Department of the Treasury as Deputy Assistant Security, responsible for International Economic Development. On May 2, 1972, he was sworn in as Assistant Secretary for International Affairs, a Presidential appointment requiring the consent and approval of the United States Senate.

=== The First Boston Corp, Credit Suisse First Boston (CSFB), Credit Suisse ===
In July 1974, Hennessy left the United States Department of the Treasury U.S. Treasury to join First Boston, one of wall street's leading investment banking firms at the time. He spent the rest of his career in the firm, which subsequently was acquired by Credit Suisse. In 1982, he became chairman and CEO of the joint venture CSFB, Ltd., London. In 1989, he became chairman of executive committee and CEO of the merged global bank, Credit Suisse First Boston. he retired from the bank to dedicate himself to philanthropic and not-for-profit activities, concentrating on education and programs in developing nations.

=== Other ===
- Board member, Corning Inc. and chairman of the finance committee, 1989–2008
- Member of the advisory board of the Federal Reserve Bank of New York, 1990–2001
- Member of the Twin Towers Fund to compensate the victims of 9/11/2001, 2001–2002
- Trustee, The Appeal of Conscience Foundation, (1992–2020)
- Chairman, The Economic Club of New York, 2004–2006
- Member, Massachusetts Institute of Technology | MIT Corporation, 1990–2000
- Trustee, George Bush Presidential Library | George H. W. Bush Presidential Library Foundation, 1994– Present
- Independent Inquiry (Volcker) Committee into United Nations Oil-for-Food Programme| Oil for Food Iraq program, led team to set up Baghdad office, May & August 2004
- Co-Chairman, Safe Water Network, Inc., founded by Paul Newman to provide clean water to villages in Africa and India, 2005–2010
- Advisory Board Member and Inaugural Speaker, The Legatum Center for Entrepreneurship and Development at Massachusetts Institute of Technology| MIT, 2008–2018
- Chairman, Care Corporate Council
- Member of the Visiting Committee, Harvard University, 1988–1993
- Trustee, Roxbury Latin School, 1975–1980; 1990–1995
- Board Member, American Friends of Eton College 2008–2018
- Trustee, Manhattan Institute for Policy Research| The Manhattan Institute, 1991–2001
- Co-Chairman, Shakespeare's Globe Centres| Shakespeare Globe Center USA, 1989

== Awards and Distinctions ==
- Exceptional Service Award United States Department of the Treasury| U.S. Treasury (1974)
- Corporate Leadership Award, Massachusetts Institute of Technology| MIT, (1987)
- Commencement Speaker, Yale School of Management|Yale University School of Management, (1994)
- Member of 5-man Blue-ribbon panel|Blue Ribbon Committee on Future of Asian Development Bank, Chair Amartya Sen, Nobel Laureate (1988)
- Honoree, New York Boy Scouts of America (1994)
- Honoree, first Annual Award Dinner of Student Sponsorship (program for mentoring and financing failing NYC public students in Catholic schools) (2000)

== Philanthropy ==
- Established scholarships for Latin American students at Harvard University (3 students each year) and Massachusetts Institute of Technology|MIT (4 students each year)
- Established International Exchange and Travel program, Jarvis international lecture series, and program for 1 student to attend Eton College for 1 year post graduate studies
- President, Margarita and John Hennessy Family Foundation – grants for education and related initiatives
