= Hennessey Performance Engineering =

American automobile modifier

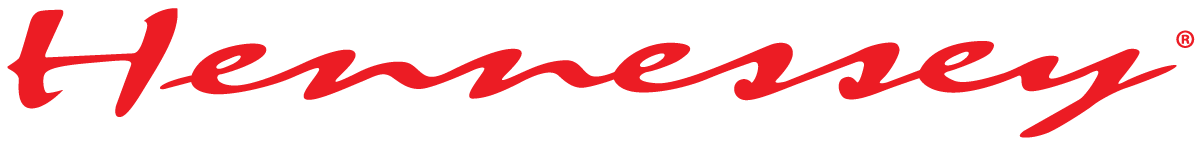
- Type: Private
- Industry: Automotive
- Founded: 1991; 35 years ago
- Founder: John Hennessey
- Headquarters: Sealy, Texas, United States
- Key people: John Hennessey (CEO)
- Products: Cars
- Divisions: Hennessey Special Vehicles
- Website: hennesseyperformance.com

Hennessey Performance Engineering (HPE) is an American automotive tuning company and sports car manufacturer.

In addition to building the Venom F5, the company specializes in modifying sports cars from several brands including Chevrolet, Dodge, Cadillac, Jeep, Ford, GMC, and Lincoln. Established in 1991 by John Hennessey, their main facility is located 45 minutes west of Houston in Sealy, Texas. Besides performance automobiles, they also tune pickup trucks and sport utility vehicles such as the Ford Raptor, the Ram TRX, the Jeep Grand Cherokee, and the Cadillac Escalade. They also work on muscle cars like the Ford Mustang, Chevy Camaro, Dodge Charger and Challenger.

== Tuner school ==
In 2008, Hennessey opened Tuner School, a private institution dedicated to train high performance vehicle tuner technicians over the course of 14 weeks, at the Lonestar Motorsports Park Complex adjacent to the Hennessey Main Headquarters.

== Notable cars ==
=== Hennessey Venom 650R ===
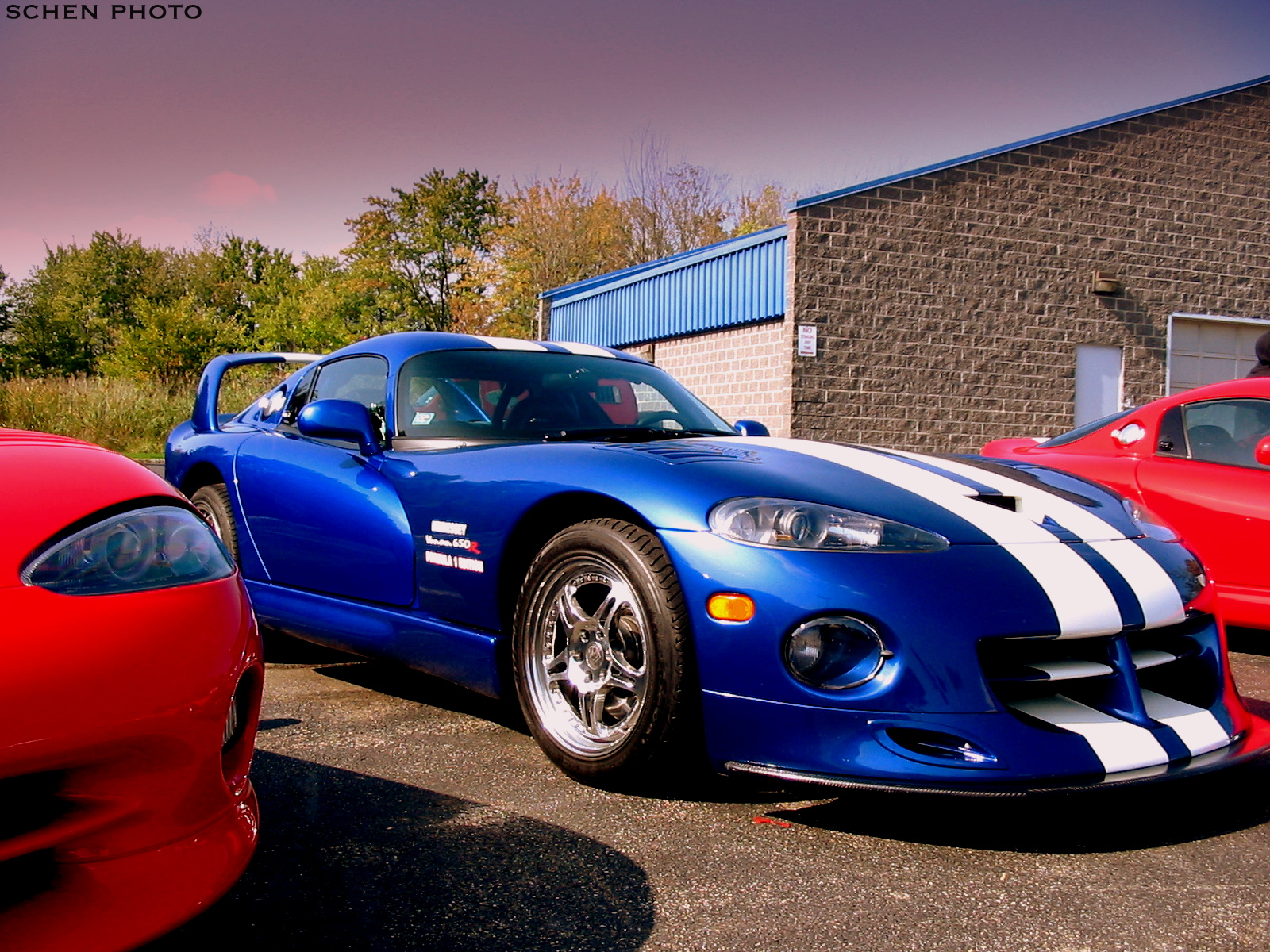
A Hennessey Venom 650R, based on a 1996 Dodge Viper GTS

The Hennessey Venom 650R is one of the first offerings provided from the tuning company. Available as a package to the 1996 Dodge Viper GTS, the Venom 650R was one of the fastest road legal cars in the world. Upgrades included a US$37,000 engine upgrade that utilised enlarged cylinder bores, and longer stroke to increase displacement from the stock 488 cu in (8.0 L) to 514 cu in (8.4 L) along with forged steel connecting rods (titanium rods were an extra $3,500) and forged aluminum pistons; the whole assembly was then balanced and blueprinted to bring the total power output to 650 hp (659 PS; 485 kW) at 5,800 rpm and 650 lb⋅ft (881 N⋅m) of torque at 4,500 rpm bumping the compression ratio up to 10.5:1. On the intake, a competition airbox feeds 70-millimeter billet throttle bodies and a port-matched intake manifold. On the exhaust, a set of tuned-length stainless steel headers sent spent gases back to a 3.0-inch stainless exhaust system that retained the stock catalytic converters, but allowed them to be easily bypassed for track day performance. New engine management software increased the idle to 1,000 rpm, disabled the 1-4 skip-shift transmission feature, turned the cooling fans on sooner, and packed recalibrated fuel and ignition curves. Completing the package was the VenomAero carbon fiber body upgrade that reduced weight, added functional brake cooling ducts along with a rear wing and optimized downforce. All of these modifications allowed the car to accelerate from 0–60 mph (0–97 km/h) in 3.3 seconds, complete the 1/4-mile in 10.8 seconds at a speed of 130.1 mph (209 km/h) and propel the car to a top speed of over 215 mph (346 km/h). A Brembo race spec braking system and a Penske adjustable suspension system with 30 variable damping settings were available as an option. The total cost of the package stood at US$108,500 excluding the price of a stock Viper GTS.

=== Hennessey Venom GT ===
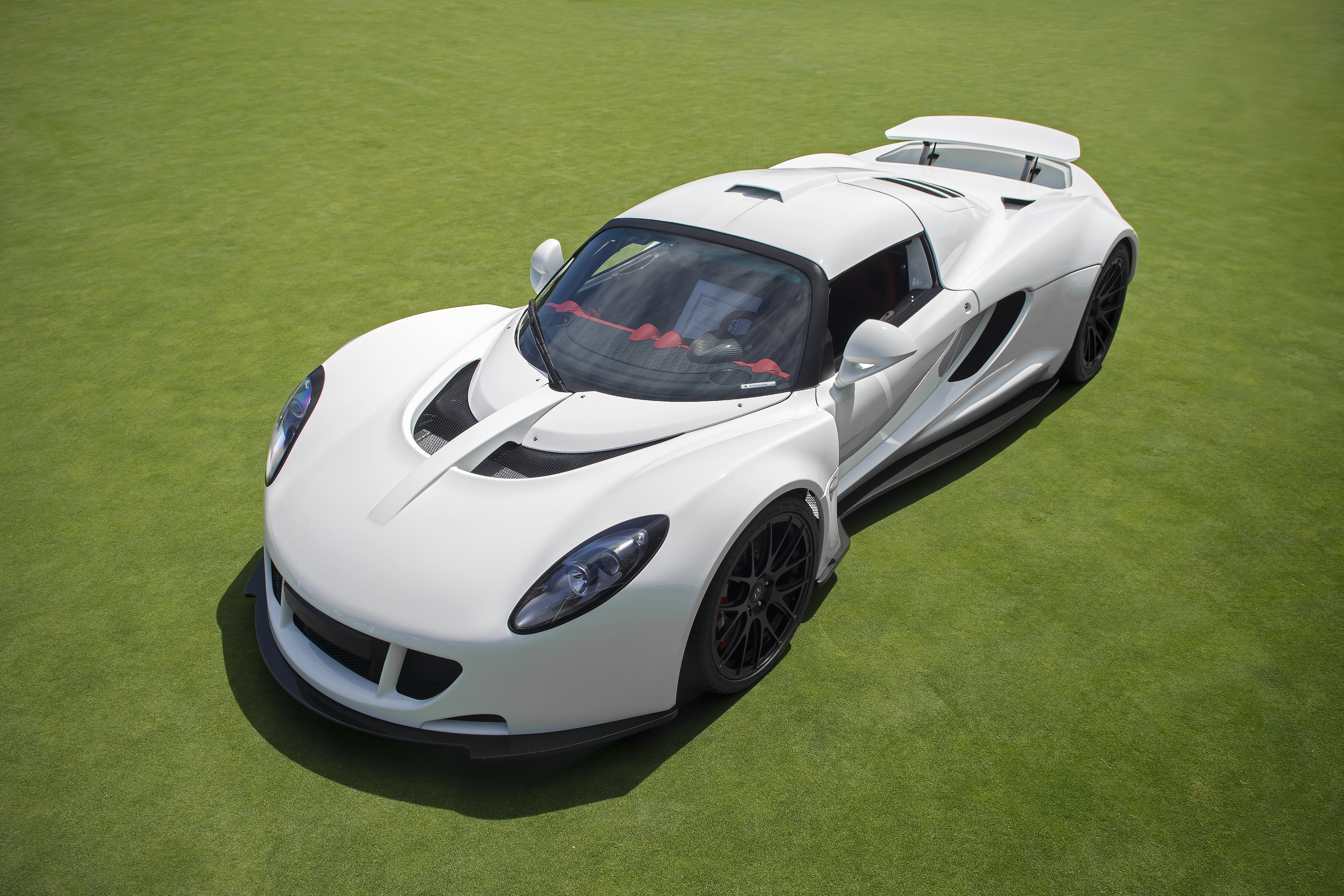
Hennessey Venom GT, based on a Lotus Exige

In 2010, Hennessey Performance revealed the Hennessey Venom GT. The Venom GT is based on the Lotus Exige and has a twin-turbocharged V8 engine that is rated at 1,244 hp (928 kW). The car weighs 1,244 kg (2,743 lb) and has a top speed of 270.49 mph (435.31 km/h). Three "World's Fastest Edition" Venom GT coupés were produced in 2014 to commemorate the car's speed record run.

A roadster variant dubbed the Venom GT Spyder was launched in 2012 on the request of Aerosmith lead singer Steven Tyler. It is based on the Lotus Elise and adds 30 lb (14 kg) to the curb weight due to structural changes.

=== Hennessey Venom F5 ===
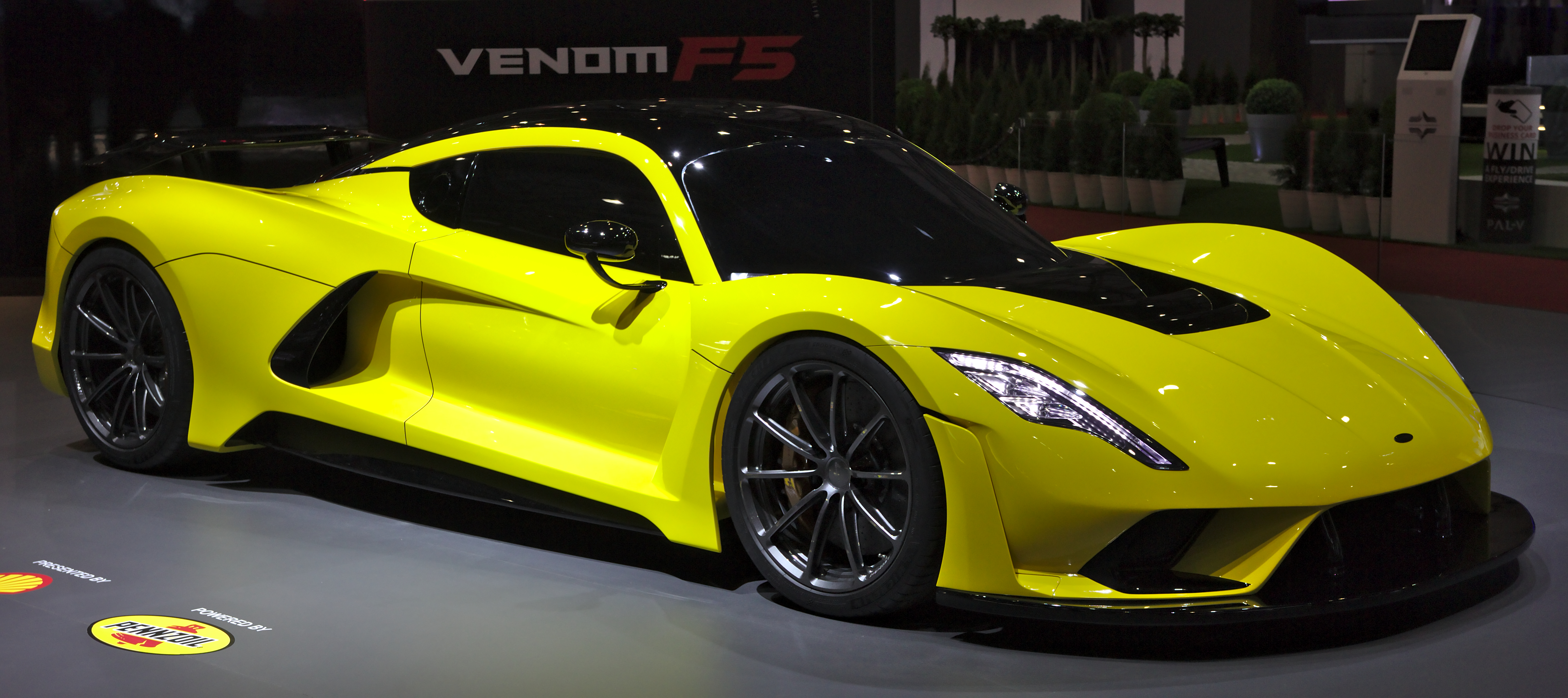
Hennessey Venom F5

The Hennessey Venom F5, successor to the Venom GT, was unveiled at the SEMA Show in Las Vegas, Nevada, on November 1, 2017, with high expectations of its intended world-beating speed record, having a projected 2.0 second 0–60 mph (0–97 km/h) acceleration time and 301 mph (484 km/h) top speed. The Venom F5 features a bespoke proprietary 6.6-liter twin-turbocharged V8 engine, making this the company's first in-house engine. It is rated at 1,817 hp (1,355 kW; 1,842 PS) and 1,193 lb⋅ft (1,617 N⋅m) of torque. Pennzoil and Shell are partners with Hennessey for the project to help reach the 300 mph (483 km/h) top speed mark. The top speed is claimed to be 301 mph (484 km/h) through a V-MAX speed-tracking system. Hennessey predicts the car can accelerate from 0–186 mph (0–300 km/h) in a time of under 10 seconds and 0–249 mph (0–400 km/h) in a time of under 20 seconds. Only 24 will be built with each car costing US$1.6 million.

=== Hennessey Blackbird ===
The Hennessey Blackbird, the successor to the Hennessey Venom F5, was announced on August 3, 2026, with design cues that parallel with the aerospace elements found on the SR-71 Blackbird and the Bell X-1 aircraft.

=== VelociRaptor SUV/Off-Road Truck ===
The Hennessey VelociRaptor SUV is a luxury off-road full-size SUV modified from the Ford SVT Raptor. The SUV is limited to 30 produced a year, however since its introduction over 400 versions have been made. It uses the same engine Ford uses for the pickup truck version. The second generation version is a Luxury off-road heavy-duty SUV modified from the 2015 Ford Super Duty Lariat Version, with design cues from the Ford Excursion.

As of 2015, the first generation model has been discontinued. In 2018 the Hennessey Ford VelociRaptor 6×6 option was made available, with a 30-inch extended frame and extra axle for a total of six driven wheels.

The Hennessey VelociRaptor is offered in two main variants:

- VelociRaptorR 1000 – based on the 2025 Ford Raptor R. This model features extensive performance enhancements, including upgraded air induction, a heavy-duty supercharger belt, and a revised supercharger system. These modifications significantly increase the output of the stock 5.2-liter supercharged V8 engine.
- VelociRaptorR 500 – developed from the Ford Bronco Raptor. This variant was introduced to meet growing customer demand for modified high-performance SUVs. It incorporates a dedicated performance upgrade package and is available with a distinctive livery. The model produces 500 bhp (373 kW) at 5,700 rpm and 550 lb⋅ft (746 N⋅m) of torque at 3,900 rpm.

=== Hennessey CTS-V ===
The Hennessey CTS-V is a 2016 Cadillac CTS-V tuned by Hennessey to produce 1000 horsepower.

=== Hennessey Exorcist ===
The Hennessey Exorcist is an upgrade package for the Chevrolet Camaro ZL1 offered by Hennessy Special Vehicles. The package includes a high-flow supercharger and intercooler providing 14 psi of boost pressure, custom camshaft, ported cylinder heads, upgraded valvetrain with new springs, lifters, pushrods and valves and long-tube stainless steel exhaust headers with high-flow catalytic converters. The cars equipped with the automatic transmission will require an upgraded transmission at the cost of US$9,950. The optional drag pack includes 315/30-20 rear tires, modifications to the drive shaft, floor jack and tool kit for faster acceleration at the drag strip at the cost of US$8,995. The optional road race pack includes a set of 20 inch light weight Hennessey wheels with Michelin Pilot Sport Cup 2 tires at the cost of US$6,995. The upgraded engine with the standard package is rated at 1,000 hp (1,014 PS; 746 kW) at 6,400 rpm and 1,310 N⋅m (966 lb⋅ft) of torque at 4,400 rpm, enabling the vehicle to accelerate from 0–60 mph (0–97 km/h) in 3.5 seconds, complete the quarter-mile in less than 10 seconds and attain a top speed of 217 mph (349 km/h), 19 mph (31 km/h) over that of the original ZL1. The package is available at an additional cost of US$57,455 over the cost of the standard ZL1 for both the manual and automatic versions of the car. The vehicle can directly be ordered from Hennessey Special Vehicles, Chevrolet dealers or the vehicle can be sent to Hennessey Special vehicles by the owners for conversion.

== Divisions ==
Hennessey established the Hennessey Special Vehicles division in 2017, in which it builds the Hennessey Venom GT sports car line-up. The division is tasked to learn from its experiences with the Venom GT and apply it to the newest variation, the Hennessey Venom F5, which will succeed the Venom GT.

== Special Vehicles line-up ==
- Venom GT
- Venom F5 Coupe
- Venom F5 Roadster
- Venom F5 Revolution Coupe
- Venom F5 Revolution Roadster
- Venom F5-M Roadster
- Blackbird

== Controversy ==
Hennessey has been the subject of numerous lawsuits and Better Business Bureau complaints throughout the years, with many BBB complaints left unresolved and, according to court records, many judgements entered against Hennessey. Jalopnik published an article outlining Hennessey's many customer service and potential fraud issues. Thetruthaboutcars also wrote a similar article where Hennessey stole a customer's money without producing a car.

== See also ==
- Hennessey Viper Venom 1000 Twin Turbo – Another car tuned by HPE
- Lingenfelter Performance Engineering – A similar company
- Shelby American
