= Richard Hennessy =

Irish Jacobite merchant

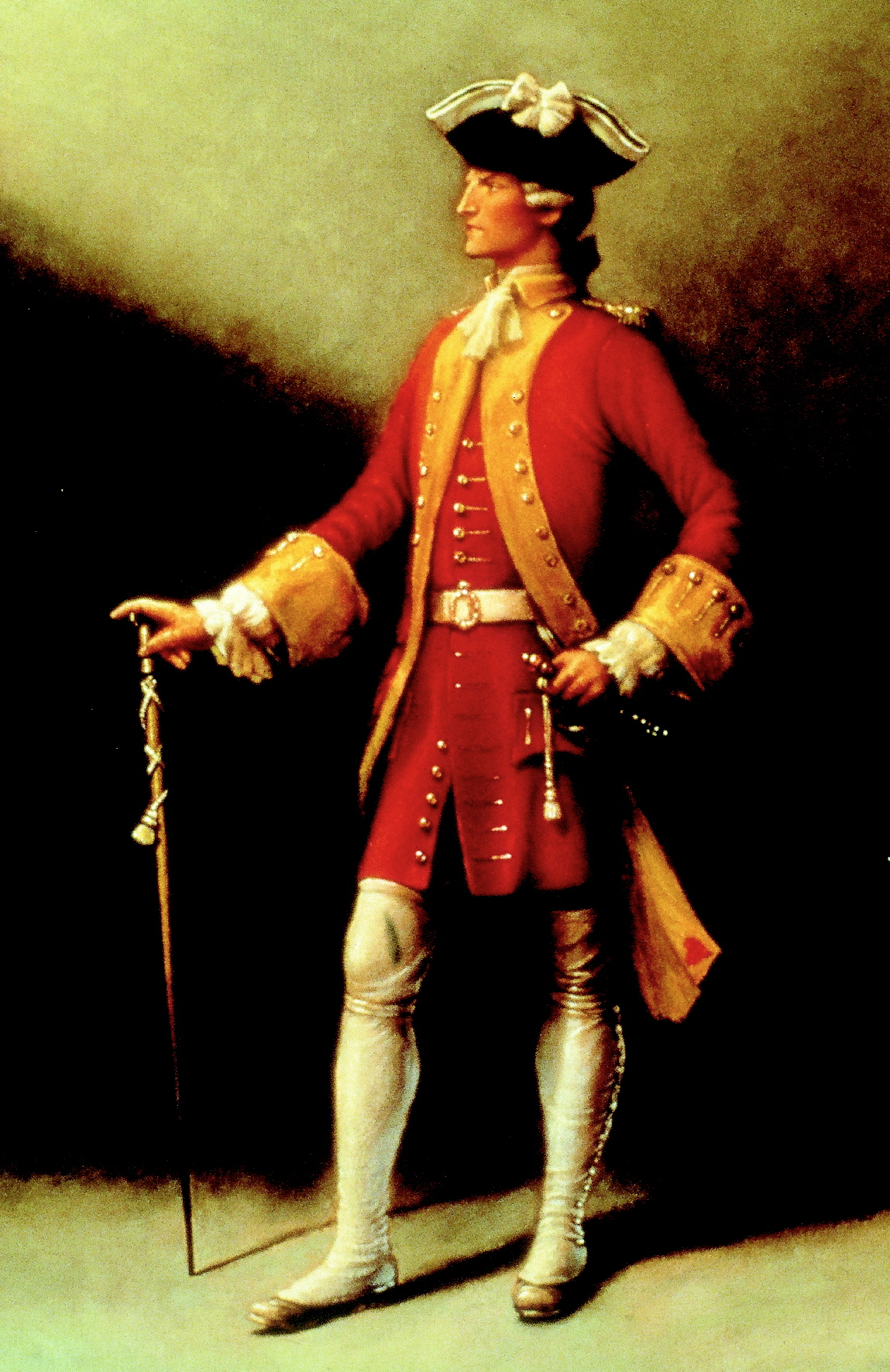
- Hennessy in the military uniform of an officer of the Clare's Regiment, Irish Brigade
- Born: 1720; Killavullen, County Cork, Ireland
- Died: 8 October 1800 (aged 79-80 years); Cognac, Charente, France
- Occupations: Officer, businessman
- Known for: Founder of Hennessy, cognac
- Spouse: Ellen Barrett
- Children: 2

Richard Hennessy (Irish: Risteárd Ó hAonghusa; 1720 — 8 October 1800) was an Irish military officer and businessman, best known for founding the Hennessy brand of cognac in Charente. He was from County Cork, and became exiled in France due to his Jacobitism.

== Biography ==
Richard Hennessy was born in 1720 to James Hennessy and Catherine Barrett at Ballymacmoy House, Killavullen, a small village on the Blackwater river, in County Cork, then part of the Kingdom of Ireland. His family were Irish Catholics, and Hennessy grew up supporting Jacobitism, which led him to seek exile in 1740 at the age of nineteen.

He went to Bourbon France, where he joined Dillon's Regiment in the Irish Brigade of the French Royal Army, serving as an officer in the service of King Louis XV. Hennessy fought at Fontenoy in 1745. In 1763, he married Ellen Barrett and, in 1765, founded the Hennessy cognac distillery in Charente.
