= Maserati Birdcage 75th =

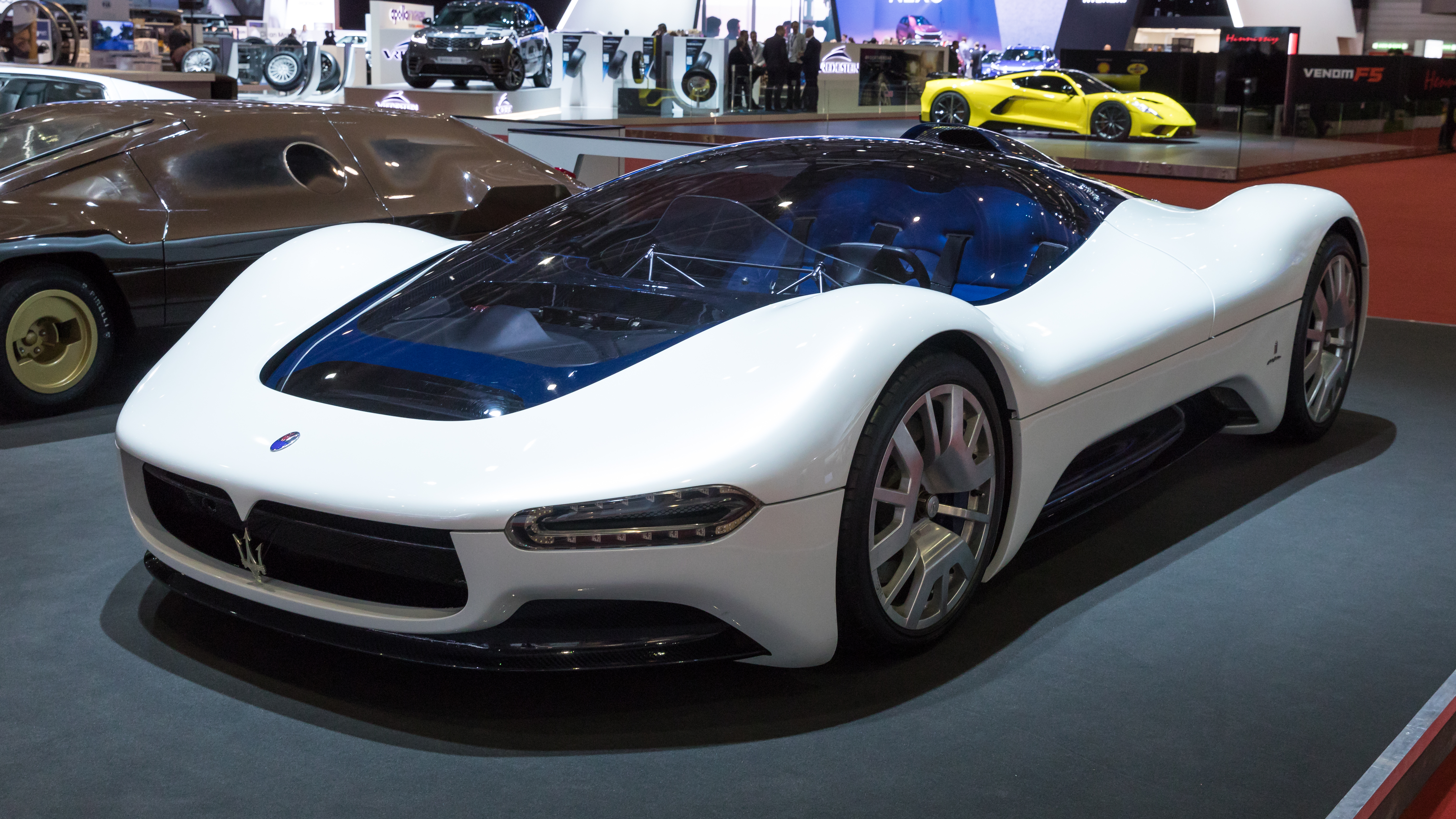
- The Maserati Birdcage 75th at the 2018 Geneva Motor Show

Overview
- Manufacturer: Pininfarina
- Production: 2005
- Designer: Lowie Vermeersch under Ken Okuyama at Pininfarina

Body and chassis
- Class: Concept car
- Body style: 1-door berlinetta
- Layout: Rear mid-engine, rear-wheel-drive
- Doors: Canopy
- Related: Maserati MC12; Ferrari Enzo

Powertrain
- Engine: 6.0 L Maserati M144A V12
- Transmission: 6-speed automated manual

Dimensions
- Wheelbase: 2,800 mm (110.2 in)
- Length: 4,656 mm (183.3 in)
- Width: 2,020 mm (79.5 in)
- Height: 1,090 mm (42.9 in)
- Kerb weight: 3,300 lb (1,500 kg)

The Maserati Birdcage 75th is a functional concept car designed and developed by a Pininfarina design team led by Lowie Vermeersch, including Jason Castriota and Giuseppe Randazzo under the direction of Ken Okuyama. It was first introduced at the 2005 Geneva Auto Show. It was named to honor the classic Maserati Birdcage race cars of the 1960s and Pininfarina's 75th anniversary. The Birdcage was the result of a collaboration between Maserati, Pininfarina and Motorola to showcase their technical expertise. The car was completed in just 2 months, following a fast pace design phase using 3D renderings.

== Chassis ==
The Birdcage 75th is built on the carbon fiber chassis of a Maserati MC12 GT1 race car and shares many components, most notably the engine. The Birdcage 75th is powered by the Ferrari/Maserati F140 V12 engine from the MC12 and the Enzo, mid mounted at 65 degrees. The engine is rated at 700 hp (522 kW; 710 PS).

== Bodywork ==
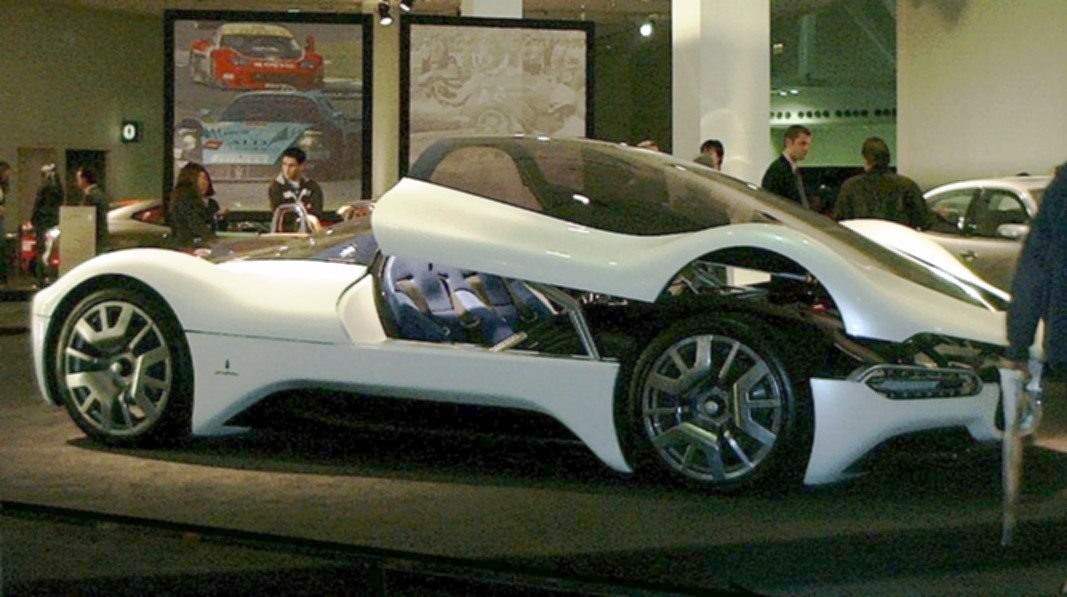
The Birdcage 75th with the canopy open

The car's body was designed by Pininfarina to celebrate the company's 75th anniversary. The exterior is made of carbon fibre with diffusers at the rear and two spoilers that automatically raise at speed. The windshield is made of perspex and extends nearly from the front to the back of the car. This design is necessary due to the driver's low seated position—if the windscreen ended higher, they would be unable to see the oncoming road. At the front, the low nose is characterised by the large grille bearing the Trident emblem, slim LED headlights enclosing two inlets and a splitter under the single lower air-intake. At the rear, the transparent engine cover continues the glasshouse effect of the windscreen, allowing a view of the mid-mounted V12 engine. The integrated roof scoop improves cooling and removes the need for air-intakes on the body panels. The dark plexiglass becomes thinner at the back, merging with the carbon-fibre diffuser and housing two centrally positioned and vertically arranged tailpipes. Two elongated LED tail-lights enclose air outlets, and the large opening on the rear bumper improves aerodynamics. The wheels, measuring 21 inches at the front and 22 inches at the rear, were designed specially for the car.

The Birdcage also lacks traditional doors; instead, a bubble canopy composed of much of the front bodywork can be raised, in a similar manner to the Bond Bug, Ferrari Modulo and Saab's 2006 Aero X concept car. However, the lone demonstrator model lacks air-conditioning or any form of climate control.

== Interior ==
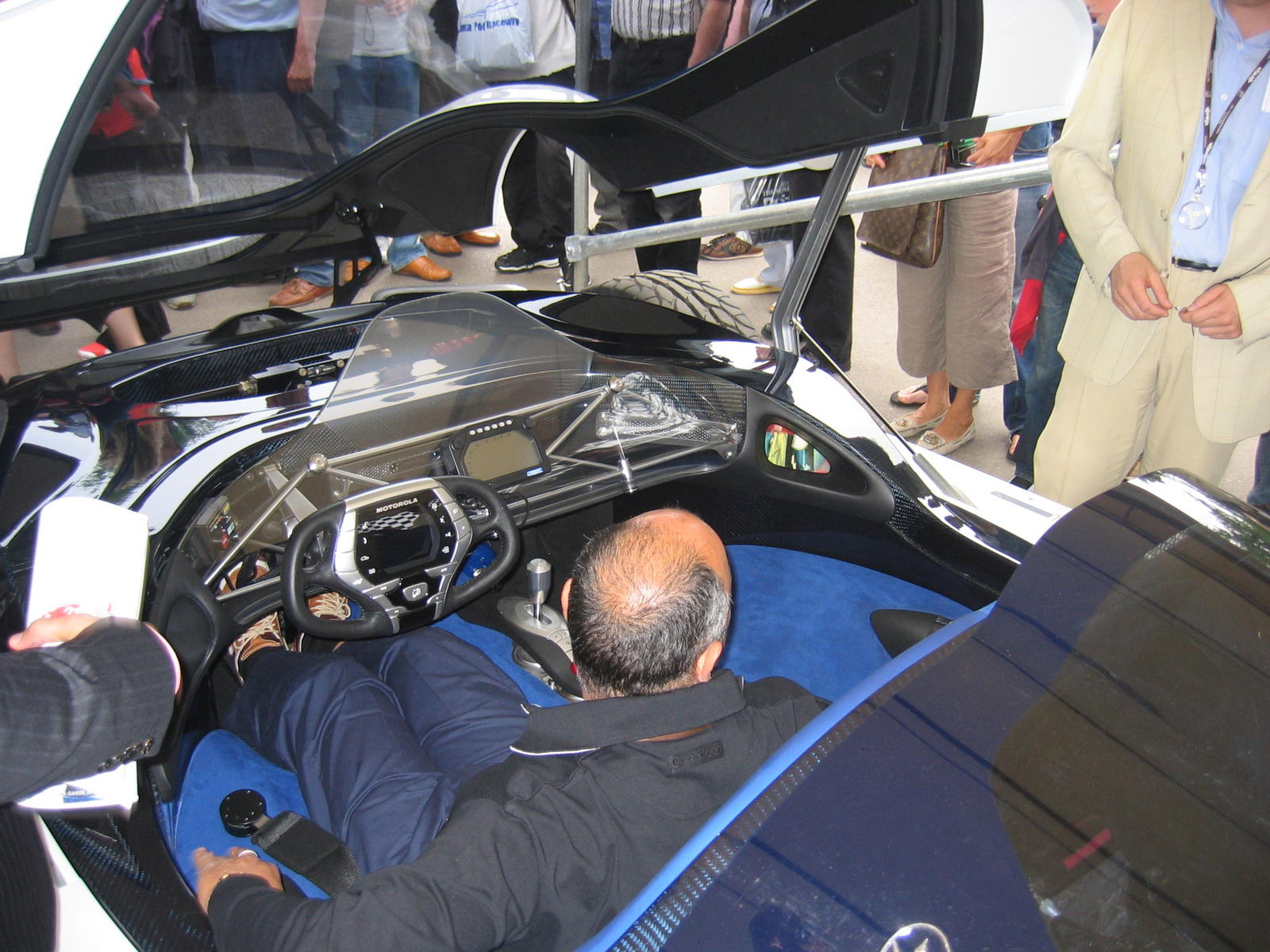
Interior

The interior was designed with input from Motorola, Pininfarina's technical partner at the time. The seats, which are upholstered in blue suede with three-point seatbelts, are integrated into the chassis. The central tunnel has a metal gear shifter and a few buttons to control various functions of the car. The cabin has a head up display (HUD) which is projected onto a clear panel raised in the centre of the dash. It shows information that would usually appear on dashboard instruments, including the tachometer and speedometer. Also projected is a digital image of Maserati's traditional analogue clock. The steering wheel has a centre mounted control device, similar to a cellphone. The interior features a dashboard which has a clear section to display a tubular frame design, as seen on the birdcage racing cars. The frame supports the secondary HUD screen. The car is equipped with rear view cameras instead of conventional wing mirrors.

== Design ==
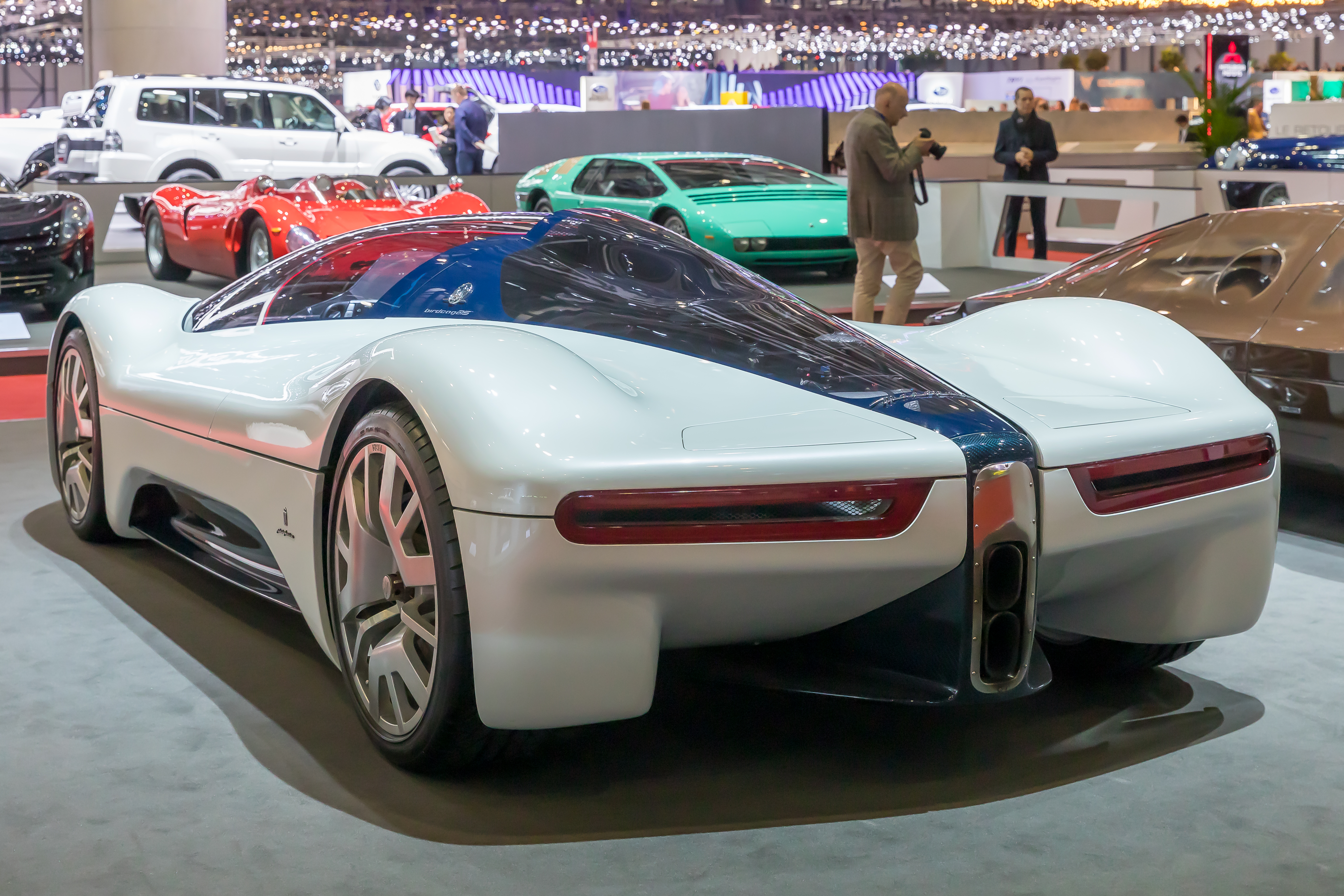
Rear view

The car's exterior, according to Okuyama, is intended to be smooth while showing supporting components from the outside, a feature seen on the Birdcage racing cars. The car has a clear engine cover from which the engine is visible, as well as a large greenhouse area on the canopy to allow for better outward visibility. The Birdcage's design, especially the canopy, was inspired by the Ferrari Modulo concept car along with the Birdcage racing cars which were known for their protruding wheel arches, unusually low body lines and tall but extremely raked windshields. The car has a Bluetooth headset for mobile phones designed by Motorola and several cameras so that the driver can "share [his/her] driving experience with others".

== Awards ==
The Birdcage concept won the following awards:

- Louis Vuitton Classic Concept Award (2006)
- Best Concept of the Geneva Motor Show (2005)
- L’automobile più bella del mondo (2005)

== See also ==
- Canopy door
