= Vehicle canopy =

Type of car door

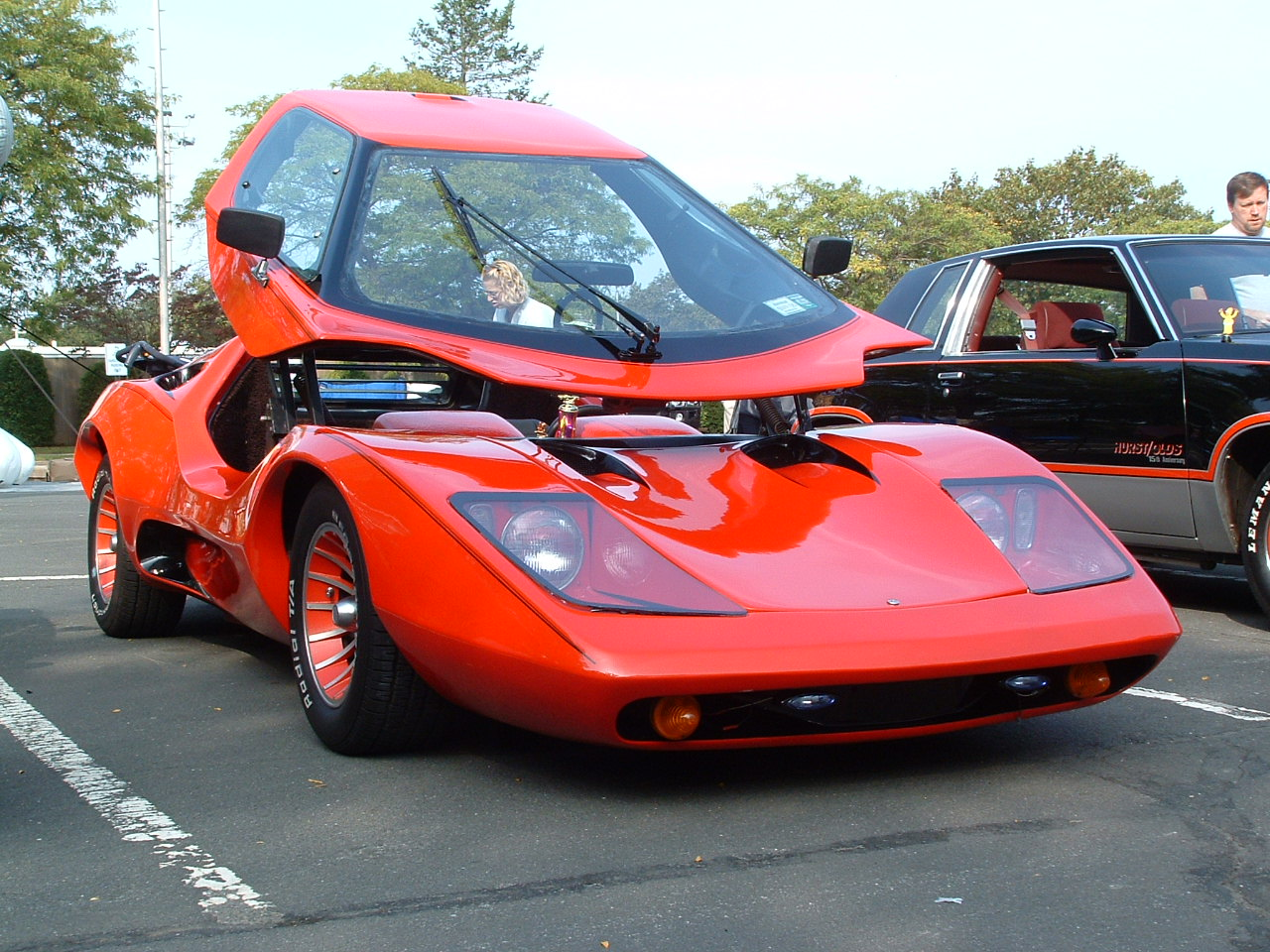
Lifting canopy on a Sterling Nova

A vehicle canopy is a rarely used type of door for cars. It has no official name so it is also known as an articulated canopy, bubble canopy, cockpit canopy, canopy door, or simply a canopy. A canopy is a type of door which sits on top of a car and lifts up in some way, to provide access for passengers. It is similar to an aircraft canopy. There are no established sub-types of canopies, so they can be hinged at the front, side, or back, although hinging at the front is most common. Canopy doors are rarely used on production cars, and are sometimes used on concept cars.

== Advantages ==
- Normal car doors open out of the car's track, so they can obstruct the road or pavement when opened. This is not an issue with canopies as they open vertically.
- A-pillars are not necessary as there are no side doors, so the windscreen can extend from the front to the back of the car, giving the driver a field of vision of more than 180 degrees and minimising blind spots. A-pillars are sometimes still added, such as in the Sterling Nova, to give the car a more conventional look.

== Disadvantages ==
- Air-conditioning or climate control is necessary with an all-glass canopy or with a wraparound windscreen because the canopy provides substantial 'greenhouse effect'.
- In the case of a rollover accident, exiting the vehicle would be impossible, short of breaking the glass.
- Entering and exiting the vehicle can be hard with a high sill and awkward roof positioning. This problem was overcome with the Saab Aero X, which has a 3 part canopy to fully open the interior.
- In situations of bad weather such as snow, rain, or hail, it is impossible to enter or exit the vehicle without getting the interior wet, unless under cover. Significant snow accumulation may also need to be removed from the roof to make it light enough to lift.

== Cars that use canopies ==
This is not an exhaustive list.

=== Messerschmitts ===
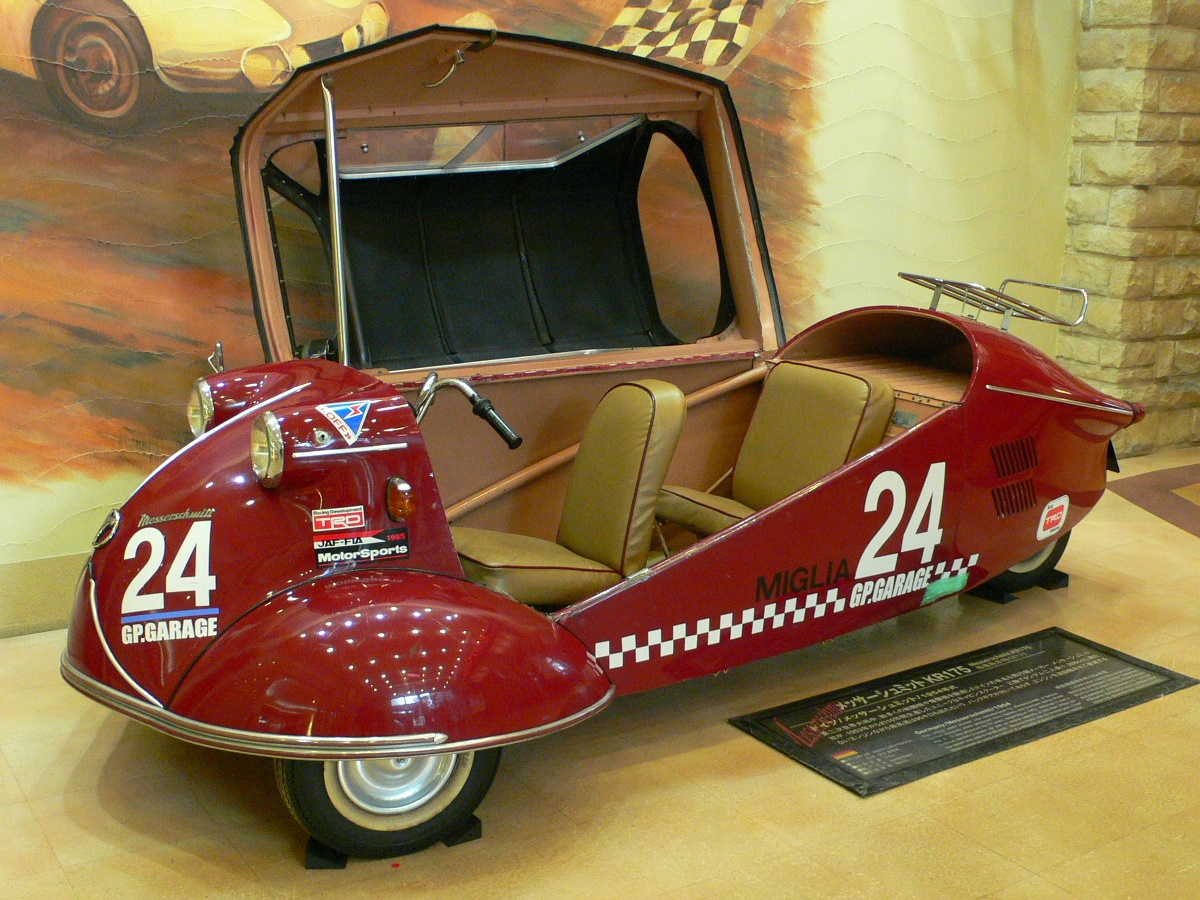
Messerschmitt KR175

The first vehicle canopy is thought to have been invented by Messerschmitt, the German aeroplane manufacturer that was not allowed to produce aircraft after World War II. Instead, they produced cars designed by aircraft engineer Fritz Fend. Unlike most later car canopies, the Messerschmitt canopies are hinged on the side, as was the canopy of many fighter planes. A problem with side hinging is that, for a car with typical side-by-side seating, the passengers sitting closest to the hinge must slide or climb across a seat to get out of the car. For that reason the side-hinging canopy is best suited for single-occupant or tandem-seat cars, and later canopies were usually hinged at the front or back.

==== 1953 Messerschmitt KR175 ====
The KR175 was the first car, production or concept, to have a canopy. In 1956, the model was changed to the Messerschmitt KR200.

==== 1956 Messerschmitt KR200 ====
The most noticeable thing about the KR200 is its distinctive bubble canopy, which gave rise to the term 'bubble car'. The KR200 continued Messerschmitt's side-hinged canopies. These were usually transparent acrylic ("Plexiglas" or "Perspex"), though reproductions are car-safe polymethyl methacrylate.

=== 1966 Alfa Romeo Scarabeo concept ===
The first of three concept cars made under the Alfa Romeo Scarabeo name was equipped with a forward hinged canopy.

=== 1969 Holden Hurricane concept ===
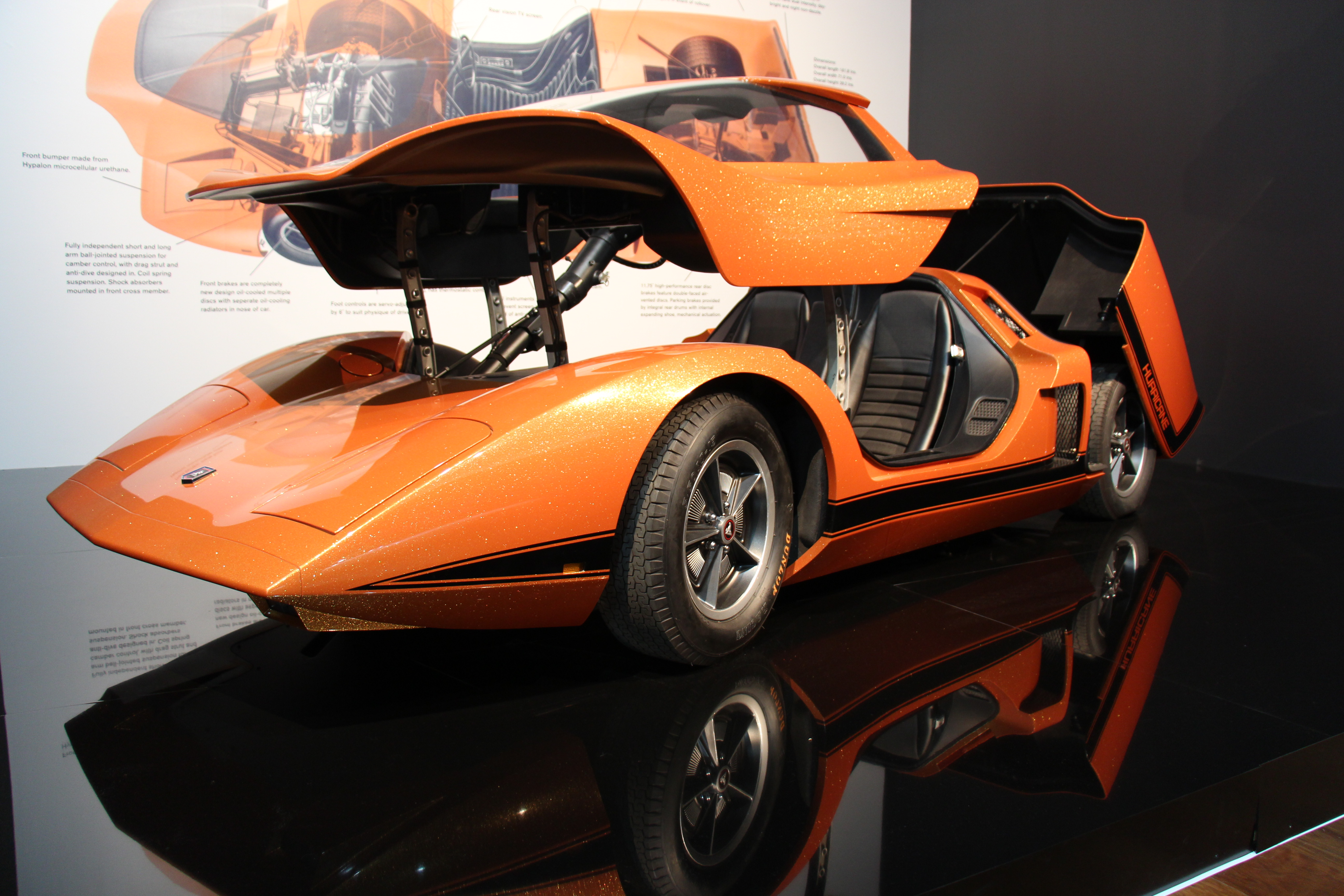
1969 Holden Hurricane concept car

The 1969 Holden Hurricane concept car features a canopy door.

=== 1970 Ferrari Modulo concept ===
The Ferrari 512 S Modulo concept car, designed by Pininfarina, features a canopy door.

=== 1970 Bond Bug ===
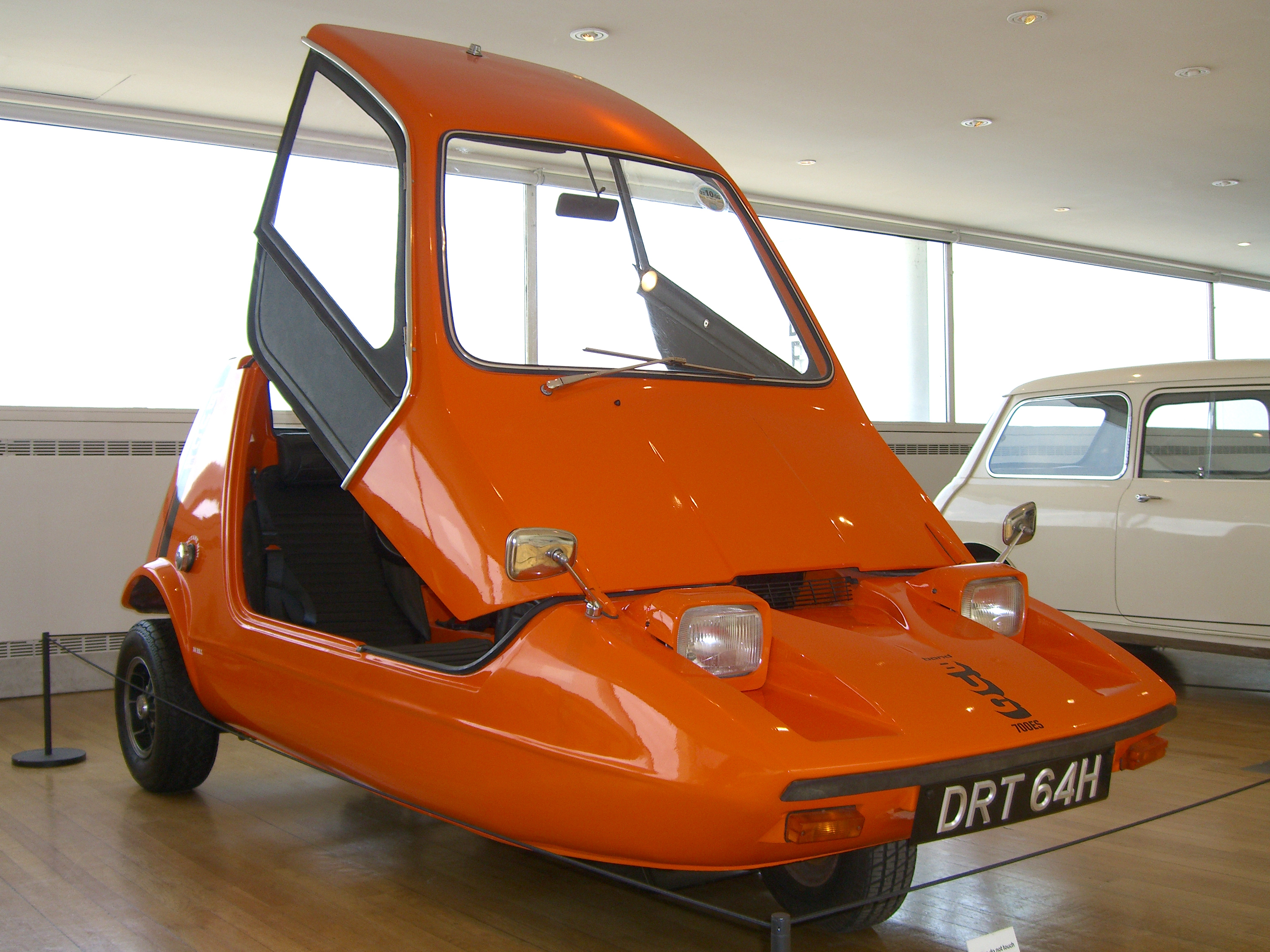
Bond Bug

The Bond Bug is a small three-wheeled sports car and was the first production car to use a front-hinged canopy.

=== 1971 Nova kit car ===
Other than the Purvis Eureka (a licensed copy of the Nova) and the Bond Bug, the Nova is the only production car to date to use a front-hinged canopy door. The windscreen has small A-pillars so it looks like a conventional car when the canopy is closed.

=== 1985 Buick Wildcat concept ===
The 1985 Buick Wildcat concept car had a canopy. The style of canopy used was an extended canopy, composed of much of the front bodywork, and not just the passenger compartment. A canopy was used in this concept car as it was thought to be futuristic.

=== 1986 Peugeot Proxima concept ===
The Peugeot Proxima concept featured a two-part canopy, where the front piece was hinged at the front and tilted upwards, while the rear-piece was on a track and slid backwards.

=== 1996 Zagato Raptor ===
The Zagato Raptor was a 1996 concept designed by Zagato an based on a Lamborghini Diablo VT platform. Designed with iconic double-bubble roof that tilted forwards as opening instead of doors.

=== 2002 Volkswagen 1-litre car ===
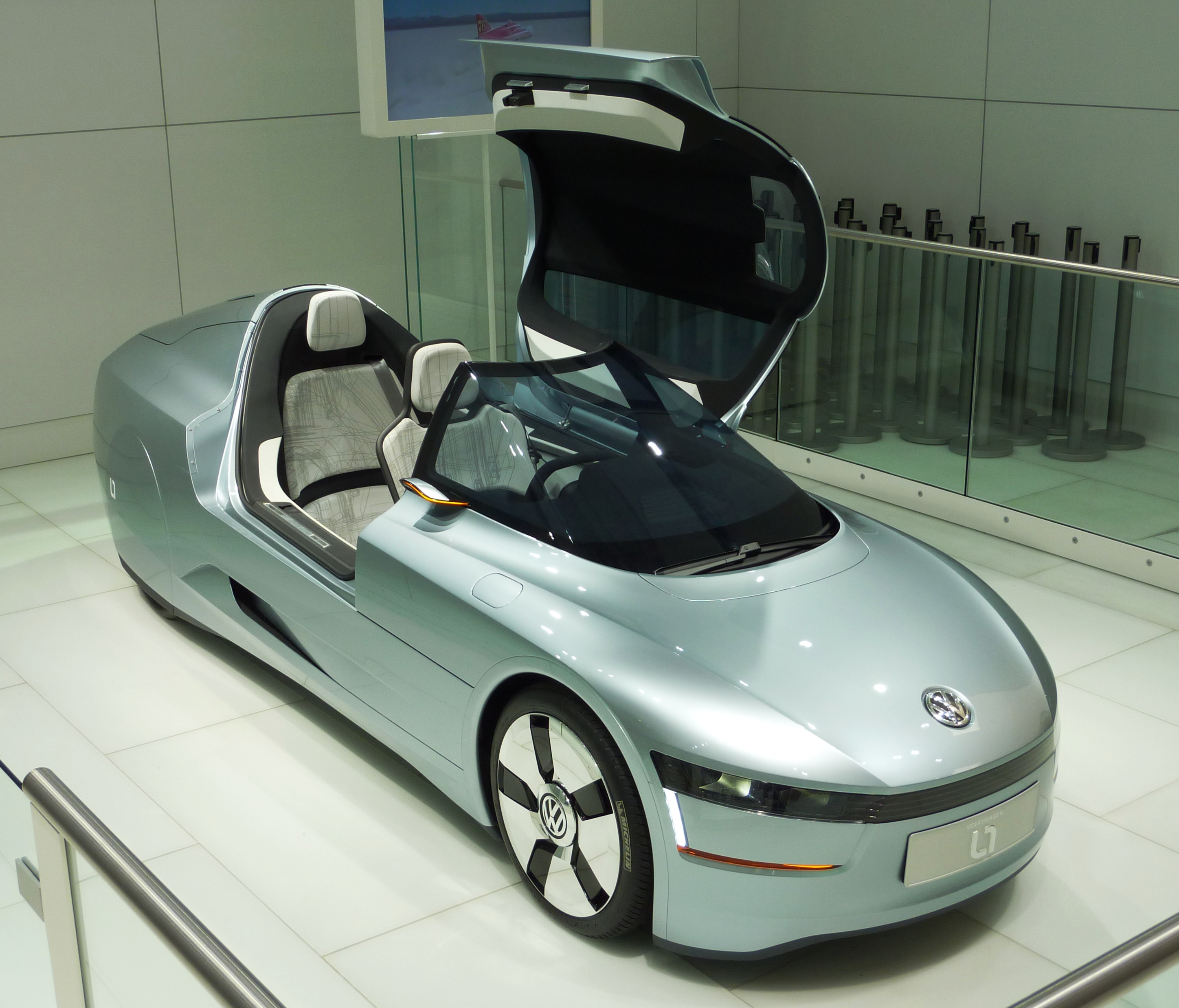
Volkswagen L1 concept

The concept Volkswagen 1-litre car, the VW 1L, uses a canopy door. The 2013 production version of the concept used butterfly doors.

=== 2005 Maserati Birdcage 75th concept ===
The Maserati Birdcage 75th lacks conventional doors, instead using an extended canopy system. The demonstrator model lacks air-conditioning and so journalists (including Evo Magazine's Harry Metcalfe) experienced the previously mentioned 'glasshouse effect': whilst driving the vehicle they were reportedly forced to keep the bubble slightly open on hot days to cool the car's interior.

=== 2006 Saab Aero-X concept ===
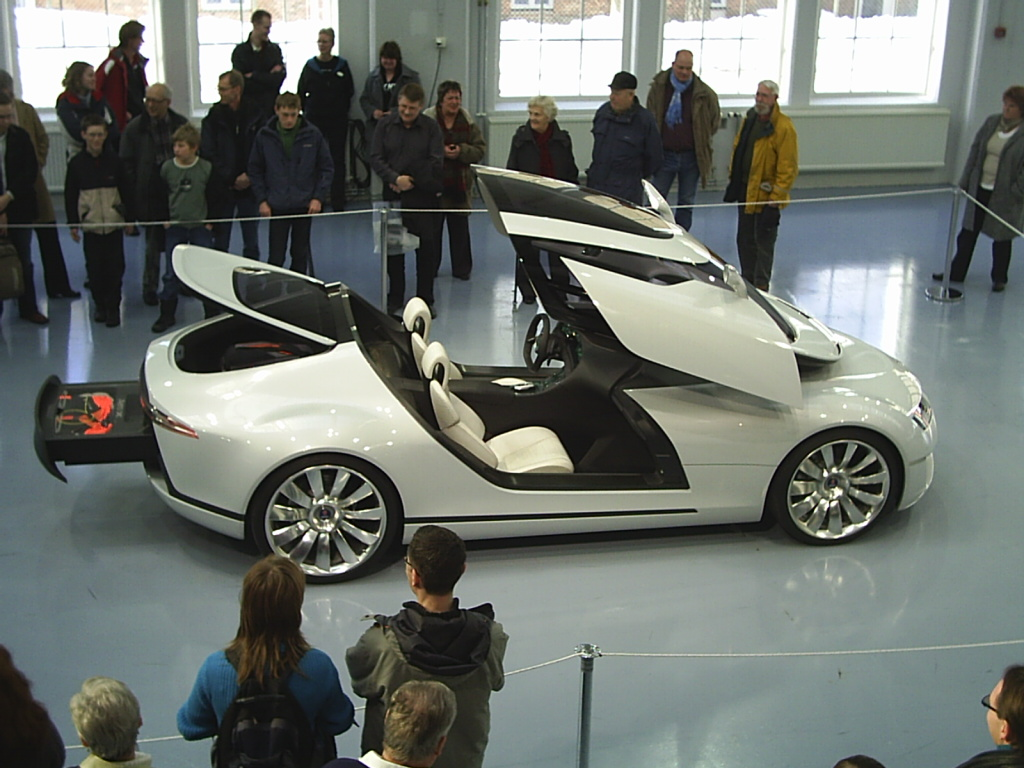
The 3 part canopy on a Saab Aero-X.

The Aero X's top canopy is styled on that of the Saab aeroplanes, and this was their inspiration for using a canopy. The canopy opens by remote control, and there is a lever to close it again.

The three-piece canopy eliminates the problems like a high sill and awkwardly angled roof, although the mechanisms are more complex and so heavier, and more likely to fail; leaving an occupant stranded inside a car. The canopy includes a wraparound windscreen and a glass roof, side windows and body panels (which lift upwards, lowering the sills), and the top roof section of the interior fascia (which moves inwards so it doesn't obstruct entry/exit). These sections intricately manoeuvre themselves into a position where they take up as little space as possible. This construction eliminates the need for doors and A-pillars and so the windscreen extends from B-pillar to B-pillar, which has the important benefit of improving overall visibility.

=== 2013 Lamborghini Egoista concept ===
The Lamborghini Egoista, the company's 50th anniversary celebration car, has a canopy door hinged at the front.

=== 2018 Human Horizons Concept H ===
In October 2018, Human Horizons, the mother company of the HiPhi NEV brand revealed the Concept H, alongside the Concept A. The H is for Hypervelocity, and the concept features a set of butterfly doors with an additional canopy opening which the company calls the A.C.E.S. or Articulated Cabin Entry System, which moves part of the roof to make access easier. The idea was later transferred to the HiPhi X production car in the form of gull wing doors or what the company calls the NT door.

=== Batmobile ===
Various models of the Batmobile used in the production of the Batman films make use of the canopy door.

=== Custom cars ===
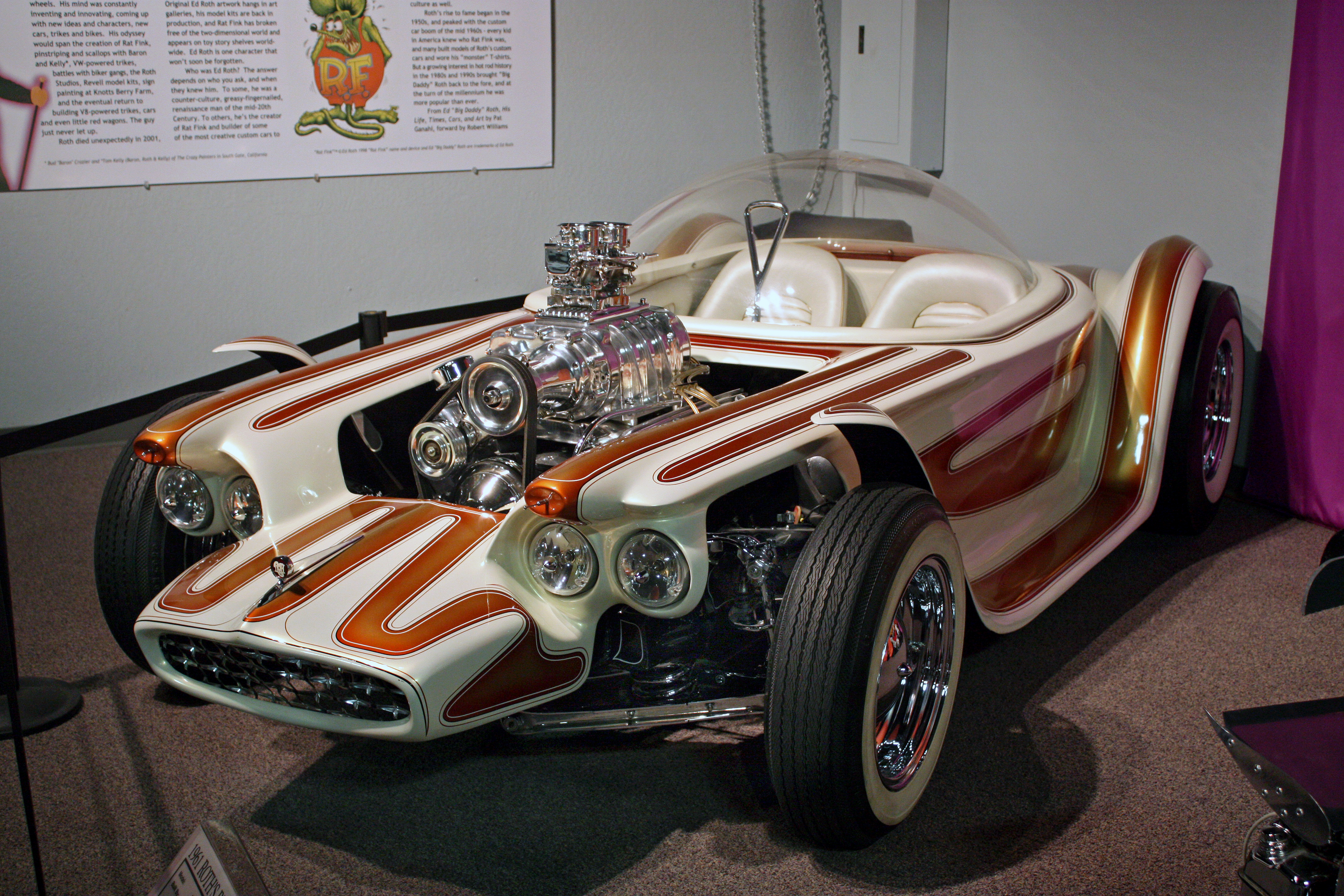
Ed Roth's Beatnik Bandit

Bubble canopies are popular on some custom cars, most notably those by Ed Roth, such as the Orbitron, Road Agent and Beatnik Bandit.

== In fictional media ==
The action-roleplaying video game expansion Cyberpunk 2077: Phantom Liberty features the Herrera Riptide, a retro-futuristic sports coupe vehicle that has a canopy door.

== See also ==
- Butterfly doors
- Car door
- Gullwing doors
- List of cars with non-standard door designs
- Scissor doors
- Sliding doors
- Suicide doors
- Swan doors
