= Holden Hurricane =

Concept car developed by Holden

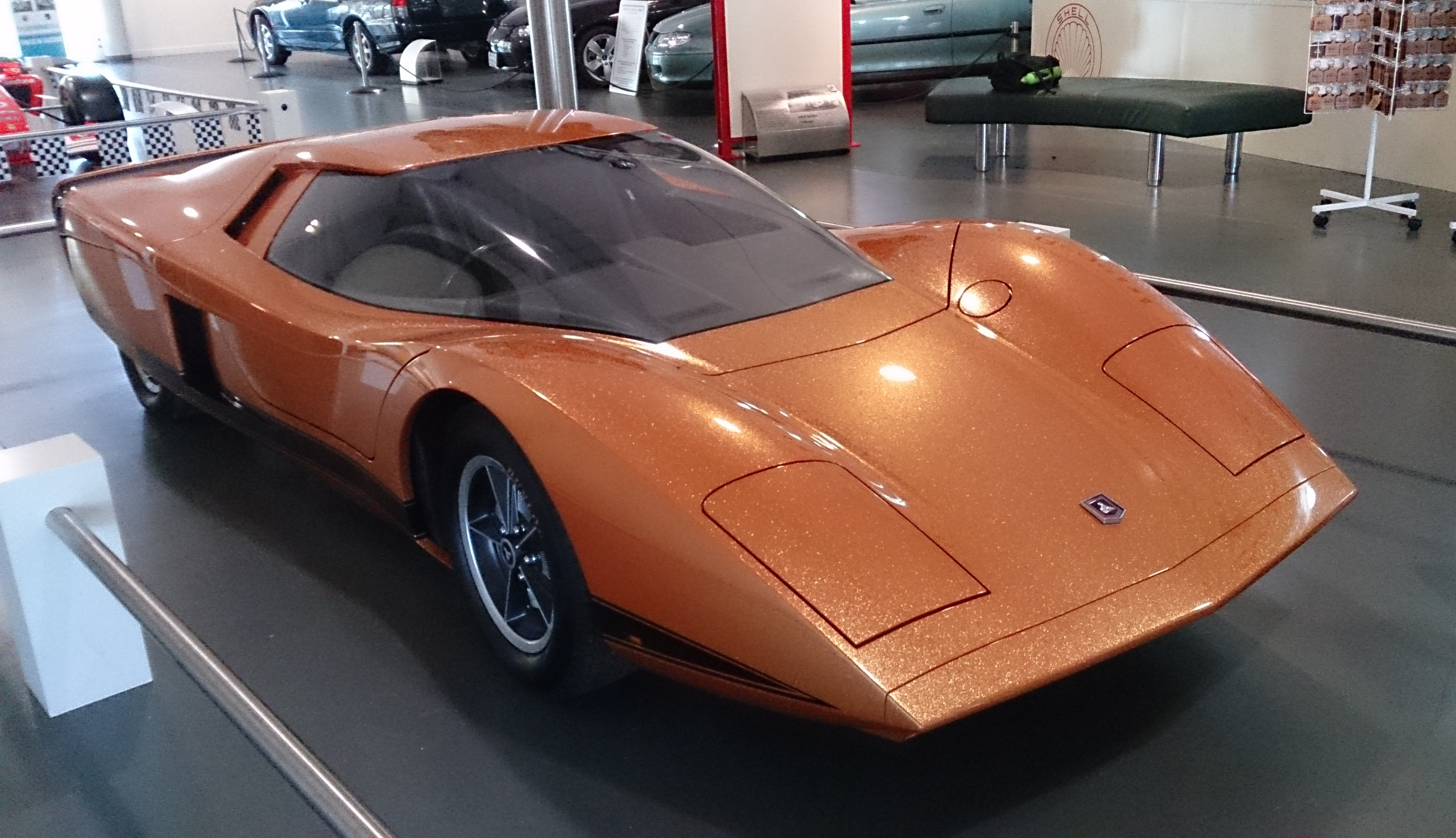

Overview
- Manufacturer: Holden (General Motors)
- Production: 1969
- Designer: Ken Genest under Don DaHarsh

Body and chassis
- Body style: Coupé
- Layout: Rear mid-engine, rear-wheel drive layout
- Doors: Canopy
- Related: Vauxhall SRV

Powertrain
- Engine: 253c.i 4.2ltr L Holden V8

The Holden Hurricane is a two-seat concept car built by Holden in 1969. Holden described it as a research vehicle, allowing them "to study design trends, propulsion systems and other long range developments".

== Technology ==
The Hurricane stood at just 990 mm (39 in) tall and was powered by a mid-mounted high-compression 253 cubic inch Holden V8 engine, the prototype of this engine, producing 193 kW (259 hp). The Hurricane did not feature conventional doors; instead, a hydraulically powered canopy swung forwards over the front wheels and the seats rose up and tilted forward. Other features included Pathfinder, which used magnetic signals built into the road to guide the driver. It also contained digital instrument displays, automatic temperature control air conditioning called Comfortron, an auto-seek radio function and a rear-view camera, which consisted of a wide angle camera in the rear bumper connected to a closed-circuit television (CCTV) screen in the centre console.

== 2011 restoration ==
The car was found by Corey Egan in 1988 in the Holden training centre. He was originally going to restore it himself. Instead, the managers decided to restore it after they got it out and cleaned it up. Forty-two years after the Holden Hurricane's debut in 1969, the car has now been fully rebuilt and restored following the original design by Holden Design. Restoration began in 2006 and was finished in 2011, with the newly restored Hurricane first displayed in October 2011 at the Motorclassica classic car show in Melbourne.

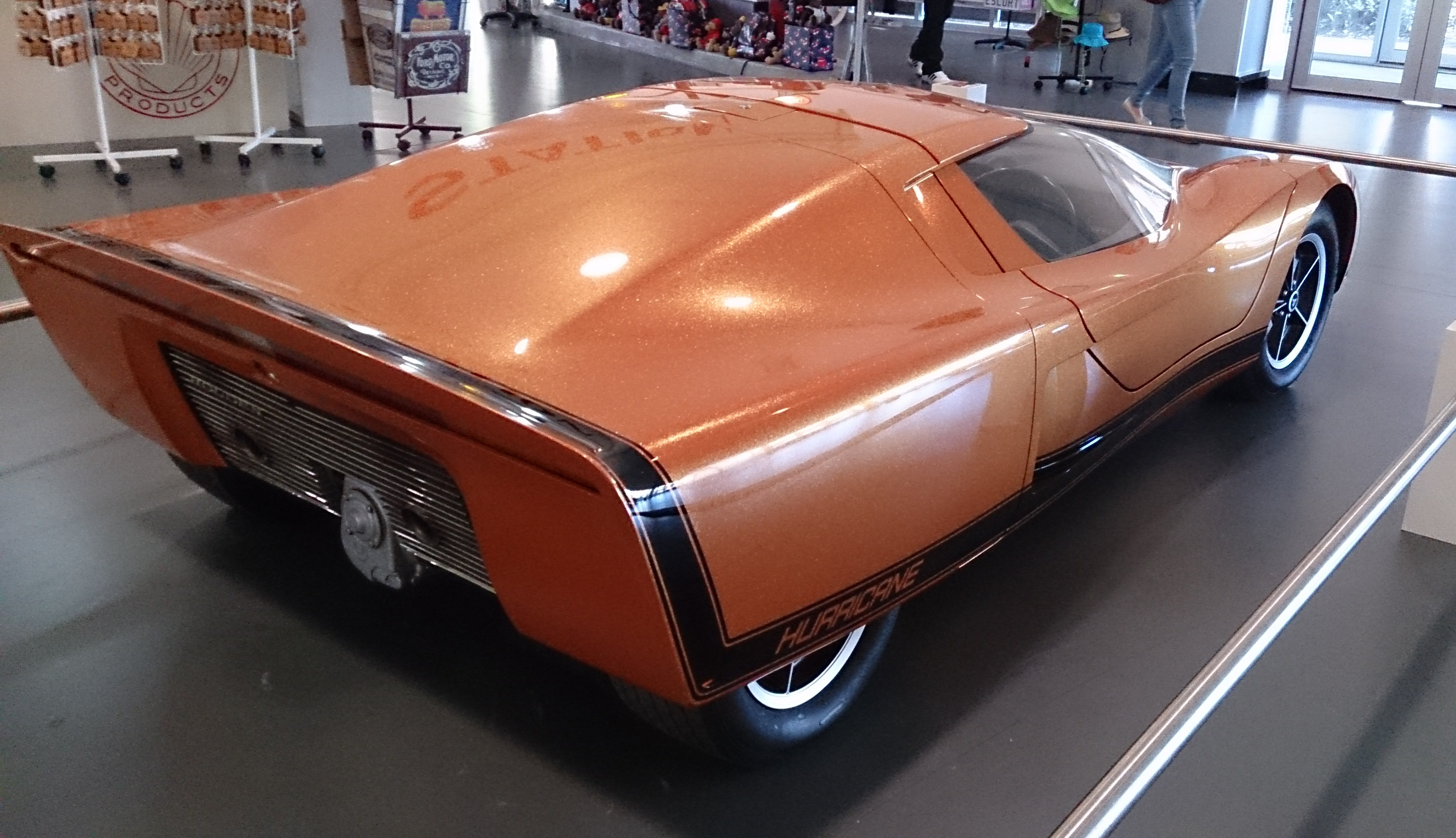
Holden Hurricane displayed at the National Motor Museum, Birdwood in 2013

== See also ==
- Canopy door
- Sterling Nova
- KTM X-Bow GTX
