= Peugeot Quasar =

1984 Peugeot concept car

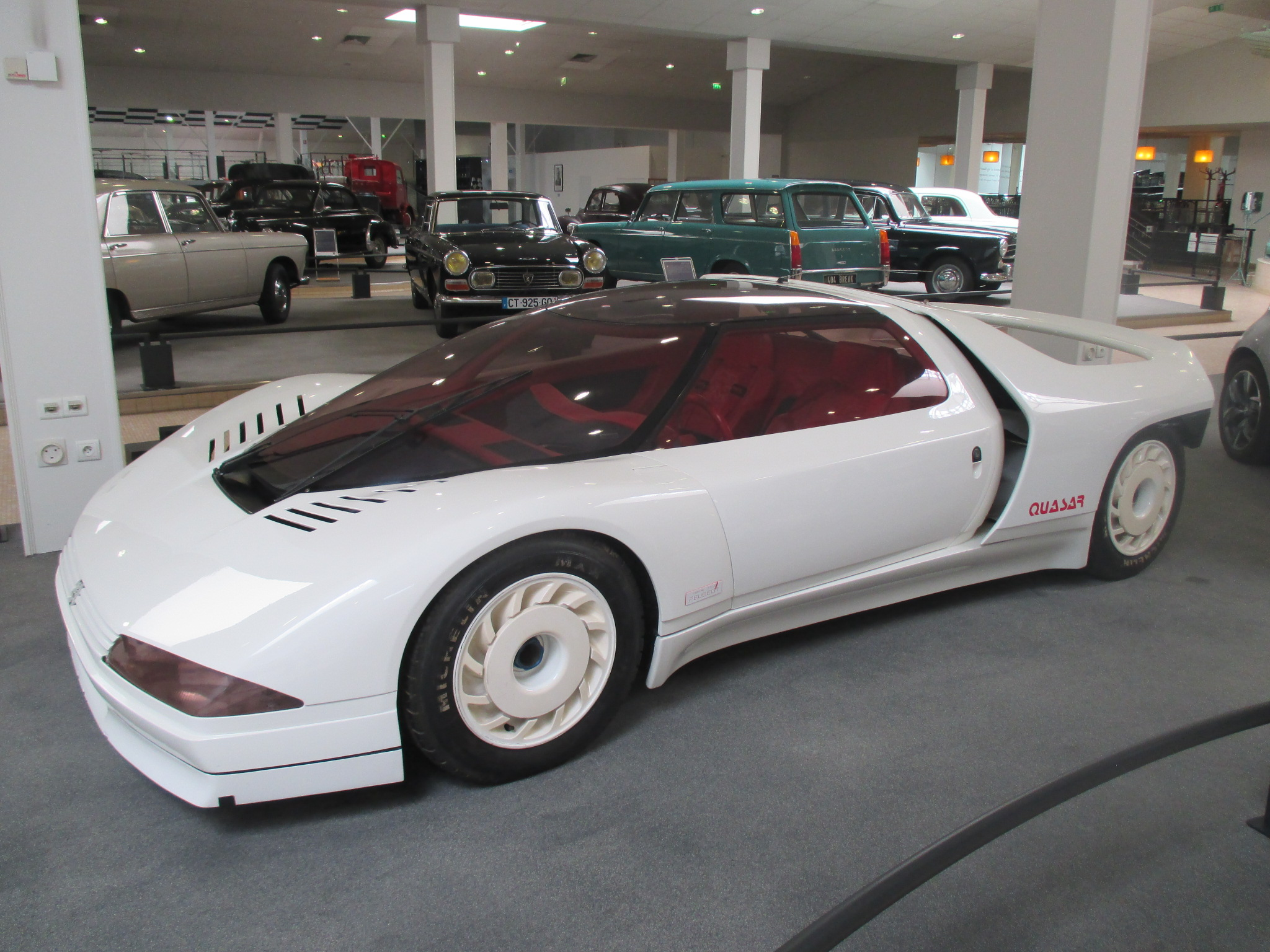
- The Peugeot Quasar photographed at the Musée de l'Aventure Peugeot in Sochaux

Overview
- Type: Concept car
- Manufacturer: Peugeot
- Production: 1984
- Assembly: La Garenne, Île-de-France, France
- Designer: Gérard Welter (exterior); Paul Bracq (interior)

Body and chassis
- Class: Sports car (S)
- Body style: 2-door coupe
- Layout: Mid-engine, AWD
- Related: 205 T16

Powertrain
- Engine: 1800 cc 16-valve, DOHC twin-turbocharged I4
- Power output: 600 hp, 360 lb-ft
- Transmission: 5-speed manual

Dimensions
- Wheelbase: 2540 mm (100 in)

Chronology
- Successor: Peugeot Proxima

The Peugeot Quasar was the first concept car made by Peugeot in-house. It was assembled in 1984 at the Peugeot plant in La Garenne, and first displayed at the 67th Paris Motor Show in the same year. Named after the astronomical phenomenon, it shared many of its internal components with the 205 Turbo 16, Peugeot's rally variant of the 205. Currently, it is part of an installation at the Peugeot Adventure Museum in Sochaux.

== History and development ==
In 1984, Peugeot sought to enter the FIA Group B rally car racing series, which required manufacturers to use modified versions of their existing vehicles. Working with Heuliez and fellow marque Simca, 200 "Turbo 16" models were built based upon the subcompact 205 for the purpose of homologation. The 205 T16 was extremely successful in its intended form of motorsport, and gained significant publicity for Peugeot.

Later that same year, Peugeot presented two of its established designers, Gérard Welter and Paul Bracq, to produce a concept based upon the chassis and engine of the 205 T16; Welter designing the body and Bracq designing the interior. Welter aimed to produce a sleek and simple series of body panels, also adding scissor doors. The decision was also made to leave much of the area above the engine exposed in an effort to display the vehicle's racing internals. Bracq took a futuristic approach to styling the interior, and reportedly took inspiration from science fiction in doing so. On the dashboard, a primitive iteration of a multimedia system was implemented, featuring a CRT screen and numerous audio controls. The majority of the interior was finished in red leather as well, giving contrast to the white exterior. The rear lights were taken directly from the 205 as well.

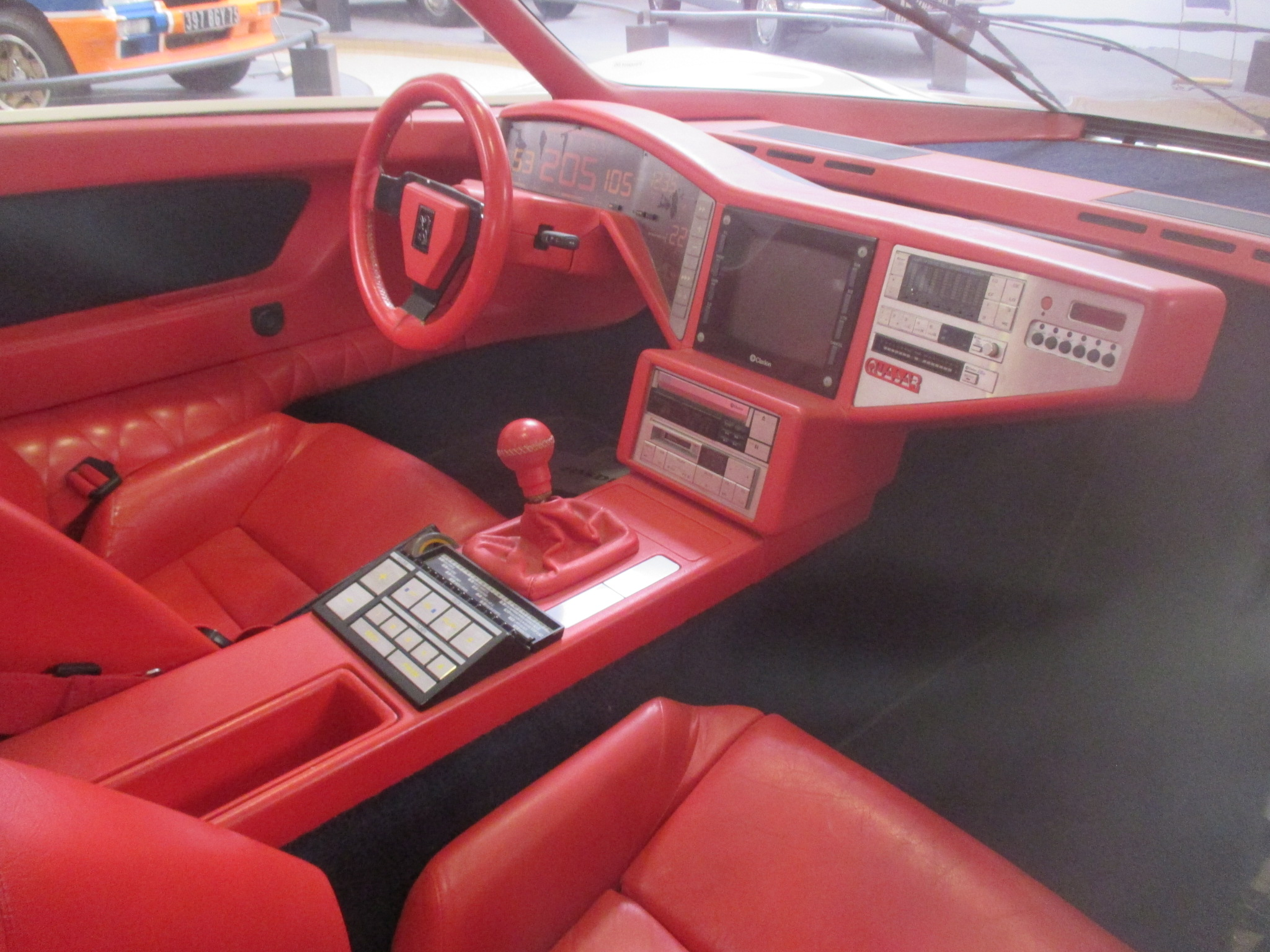
Interior view, showing the central screen and extensive use of red leather.

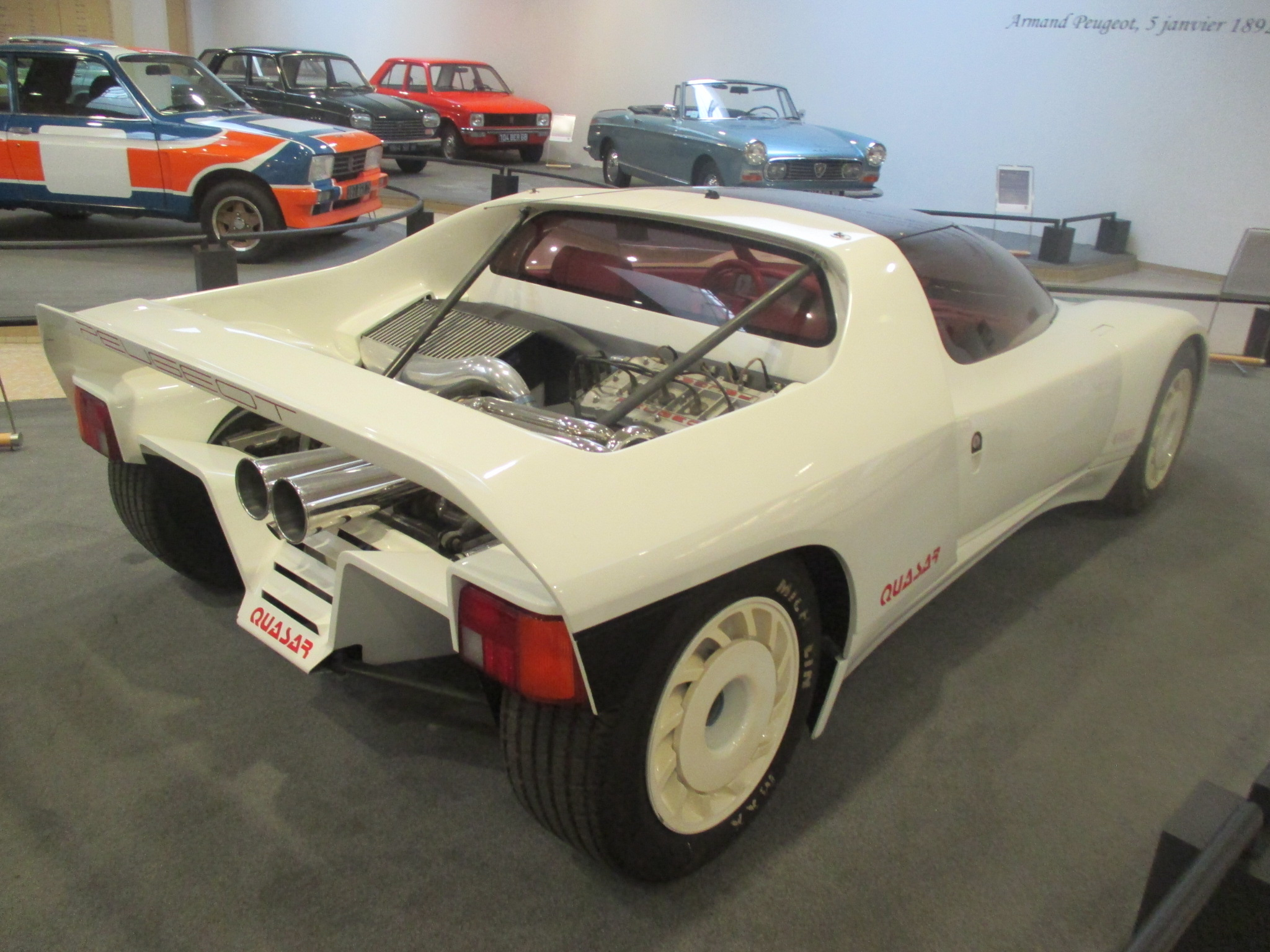
Rear view, showing the lack of rear body panels and exposed engine.

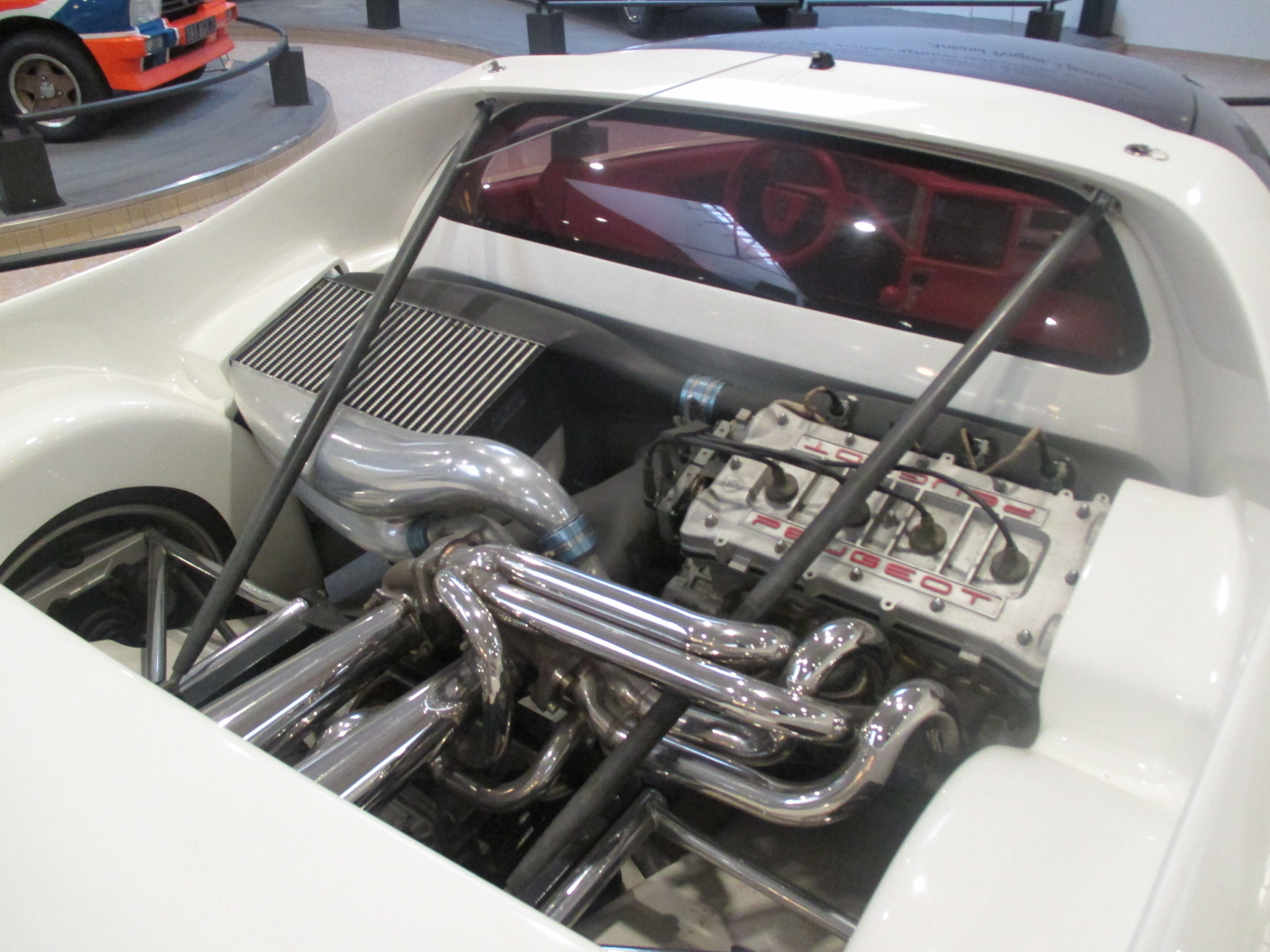
Engine view

Despite the thorough concept, the Quasar never went into production, with the prototype being displayed at the Peugeot Adventure Museum.

== Specifications ==
The Quasar retained the mid-mounted twin-turbo inline-four engine from the 205 T16, tuned to produce 600 horsepower and 360 pound-feet of torque. It featured turbofan-styled wheels which would later be applied to the SV24 sport trim level of the 605, and sported Michelin MXX 255/50 R16 tires, then one of the most advanced compounds available. Like on the T16, the suspension was very similar in design to that of Formula One cars, and various components were made of kevlar or carbon fibre for weight reduction. The 40/60 Ferguson AWD system, with limited slip differentials at both axles, like in the 205 T16, was permanently active.
