= Lamborghini Egoista =

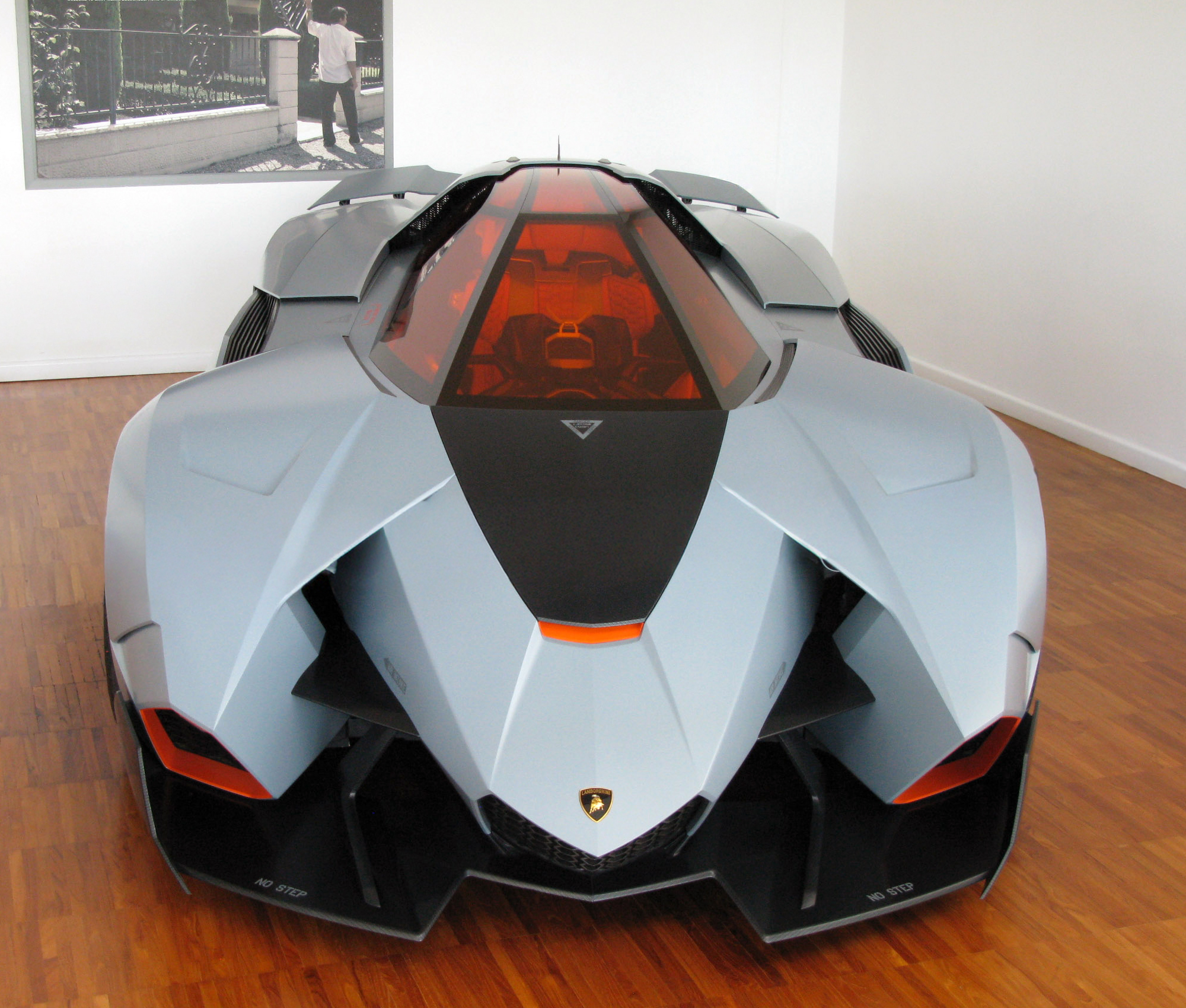

Overview
- Manufacturer: Automobili Lamborghini S.p.A.
- Production: 2013
- Designer: Walter de Silva

Body and chassis
- Class: Concept car (S)
- Body style: Hatch-top coupé
- Layout: Mid-engine, all-wheel drive
- Doors: Canopy door
- Related: Lamborghini Gallardo

Powertrain
- Engine: 5.2 L (317 cu in) V10

The Lamborghini Egoista is a concept car unveiled by Lamborghini in 2013 for the company's 50th anniversary. The fully functioning model is powered by the 5.2 L (317 cu in) V10 engine from the Gallardo producing 600 hp (447 kW; 608 PS).

The name "Egoista" comes from the Italian word for selfish. According to the car's designer Walter de Silva, the Egoista "represents hedonism taken to the extreme".

The design of the Egoista is inspired by aviation, particularly military aircraft such as fighter jets and the Apache helicopter. The exterior is also meant to resemble a bull ready to charge when looked at from the side.

The Egoista features a unique one-seat cockpit, similar to that of a modern fighter jet, and a canopy door with orange tinted, anti glare windows. The cockpit, made from carbon fiber and aluminum, is designed to be a "survival cell", inspired by the cockpits of Apache helicopters, and is reportedly completely removable from the car. The steering wheel must be removed to enter and exit the vehicle like a Formula One car. The interior also features a heads-up display and 4-point seatbelts. The LED lighting also resembles that of a modern airplane, with side markers and indicators on the sides and top of the car as well as front and rear. The bodywork consists of active aerodynamic panels that raise and lower for optimum downforce and stability. The body and wheels are also made of anti-radar material, another fighter jet inspired detail.

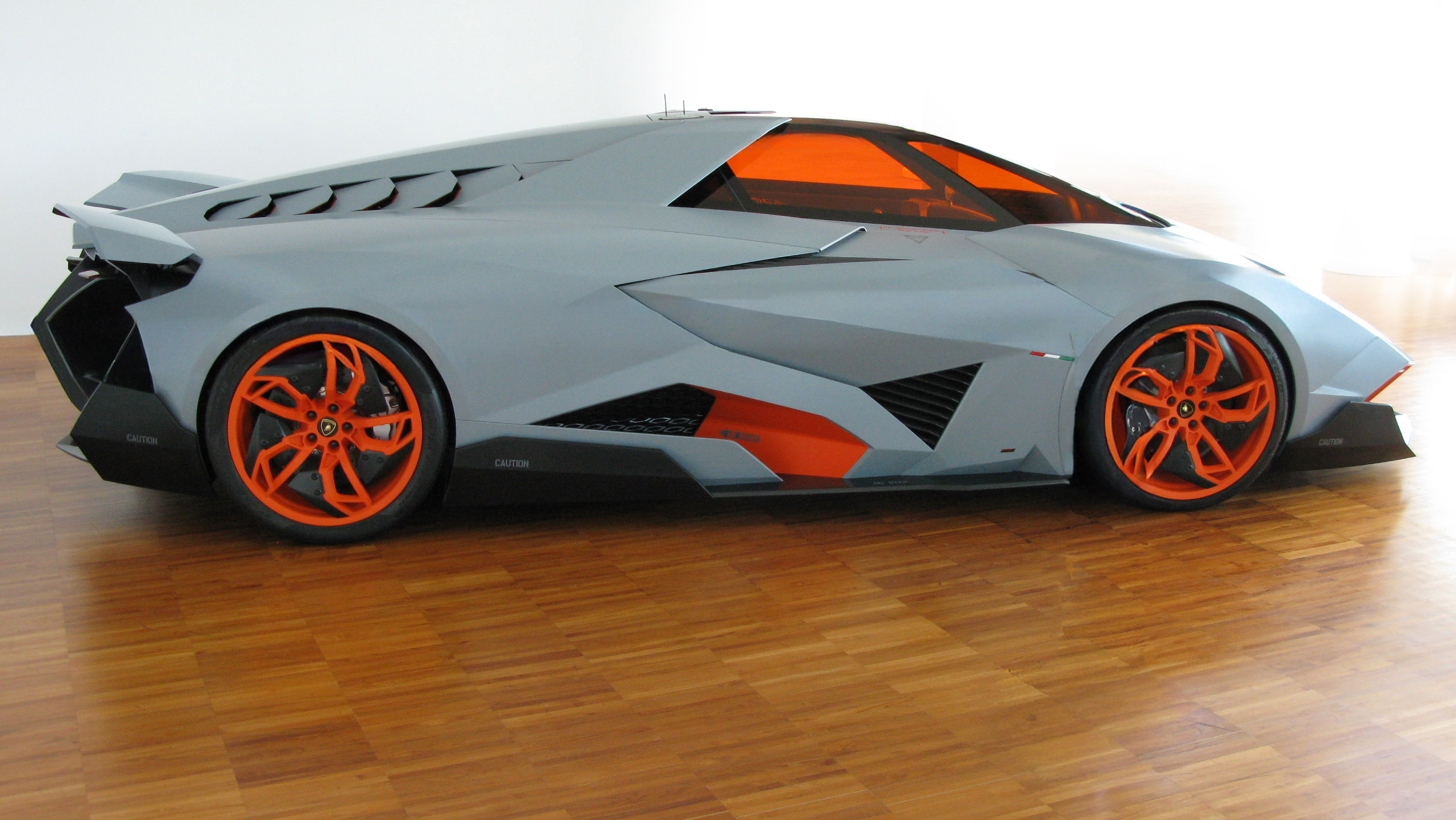
Side view

Upon introduction, Lamborghini said they didn't intend to sell the car, and that it was "a gift from Lamborghini to Lamborghini". The car was displayed at the Museo Lamborghini located in Sant'Agata Bolognese. In 2025, the car was rumored to have been sold to a private collector in Switzerland for $117 million.
