= Peugeot Proxima =

1986 Peugeot concept car

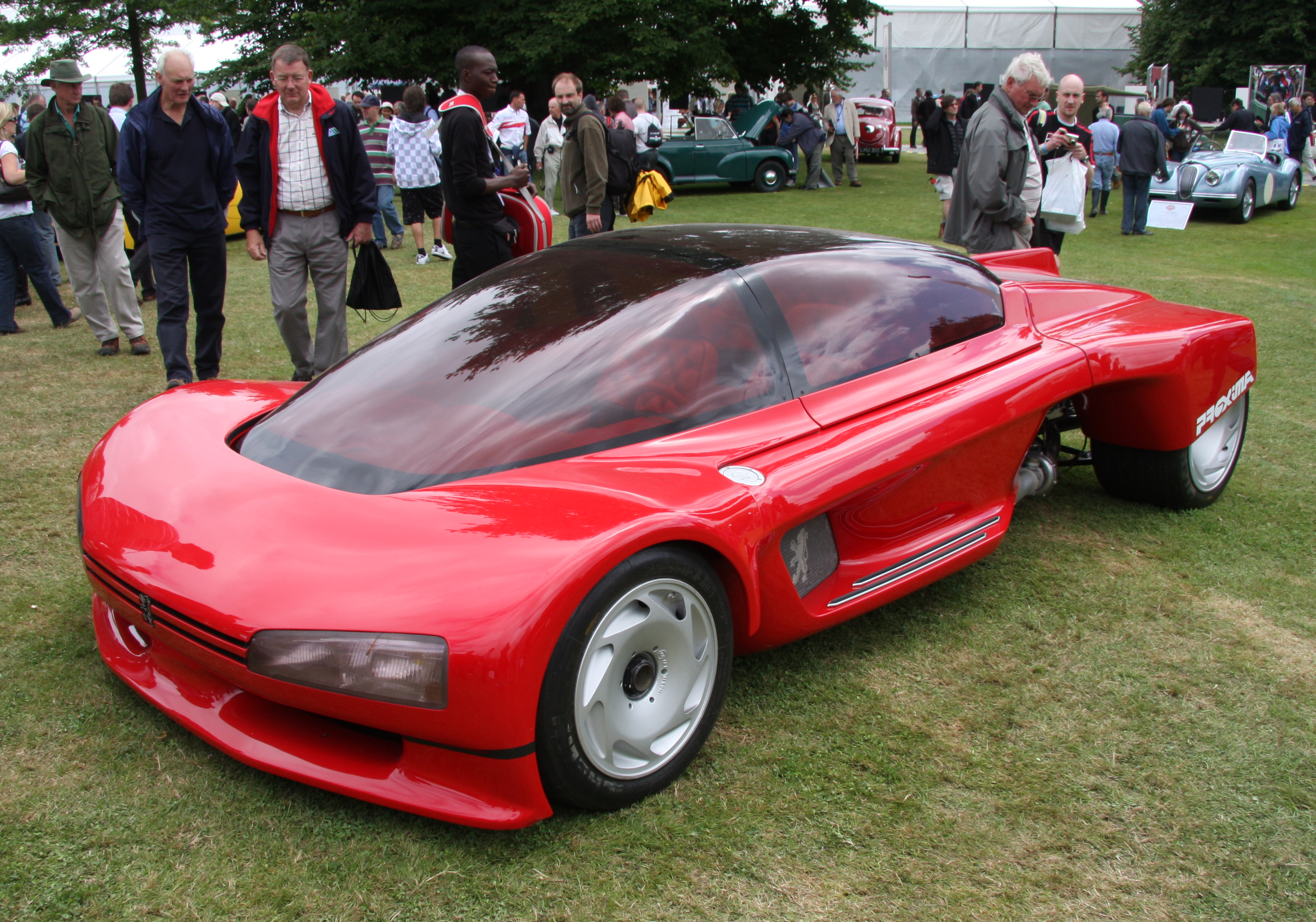

Overview
- Type: Concept car
- Manufacturer: Peugeot
- Production: 1986 (concept car)
- Assembly: La Garenne, Île-de-France, France
- Designer: Gérard Welter (exterior); Paul Bracq (interior)

Body and chassis
- Class: Sports car (S)
- Body style: 2-door coupe
- Layout: Mid-engine, AWD
- Related: Peugeot 205 T16

Powertrain
- Engine: 2.85 L (174 cu in) PRV, 24-valve, DOHC twin-turbocharged V6
- Power output: 680 hp, 448 lb-ft
- Transmission: 5-speed manual

Dimensions
- Length: 4,420 mm (174 in)
- Width: 2,060 mm (81 in)
- Height: 1,140 mm (45 in)
- Curb weight: 1,080 kg (2,381 lb)

The Peugeot Proxima is a concept car, designed, developed, and built by French manufacturer Peugeot in 1986.

== History ==
Peugeot presented the Proxima at the 1986 Paris Motor Show. The successor to the 1984 Peugeot Quasar (and predecessor to the 1988 Peugeot Oxia), it was inspired by science fiction, and is named after Proxima Centauri, the closest star to the Solar System.

The bodywork of the 2+2 coupé was created by the Peugeot Style Center with the use of CAD, a new technology at the time. It uses a range of composite materials, including resins and carbon fiber, and a large polycarbonate glazed cockpit. The cockpit is entered through the polycarbonate canopy, which splits in half crosswise. The front half of the canopy rotates forward at its base, while the rear half slides backward.

The Proxima is powered by a 2,849 cm^{3} (173.9 cu in) twin-turbocharged V6 engine producing 680 hp. A traction control solution automatically transmits power to the front wheels when rear-wheel slippage is detected, while the gearbox and clutch are also electronically controlled. The Proxima also features ventilated carbon disc brakes with ABS.

The cockpit can accommodate up to four passengers. Two onboard computers and five high-definition color screens assist the driver with rear-view cameras and an anti-collision radar, giving the driver a full view of the car's surroundings. In addition, the car features one of the prototypes of a satellite navigation system (GPS), and an electronic key card to open the car and start the engine. The heat produced by the sun on the large glazed dome of the cockpit is cooled when stationary by a temperature control system powered by a solar panel on the rear of the car.

== Gallery ==
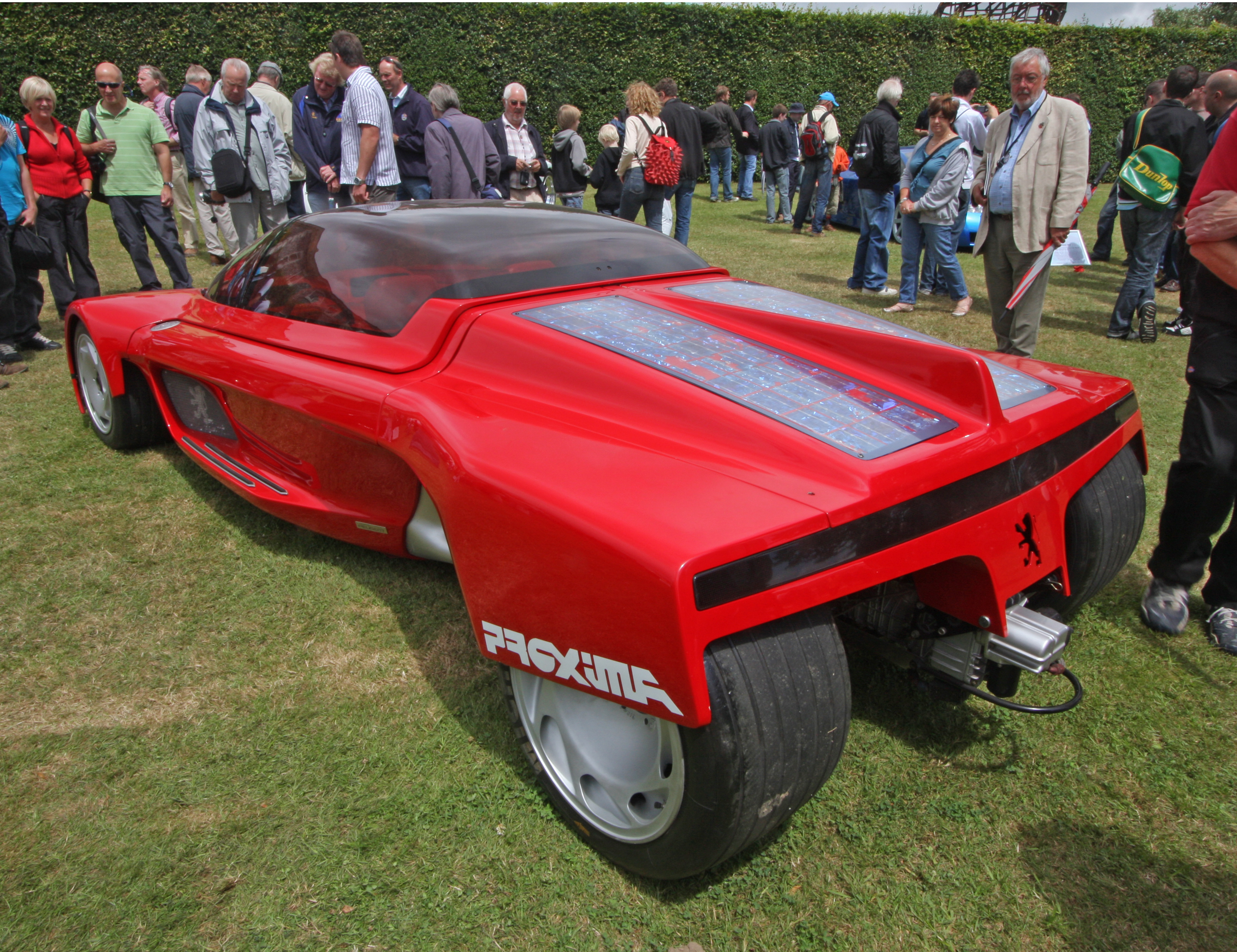
Rear view

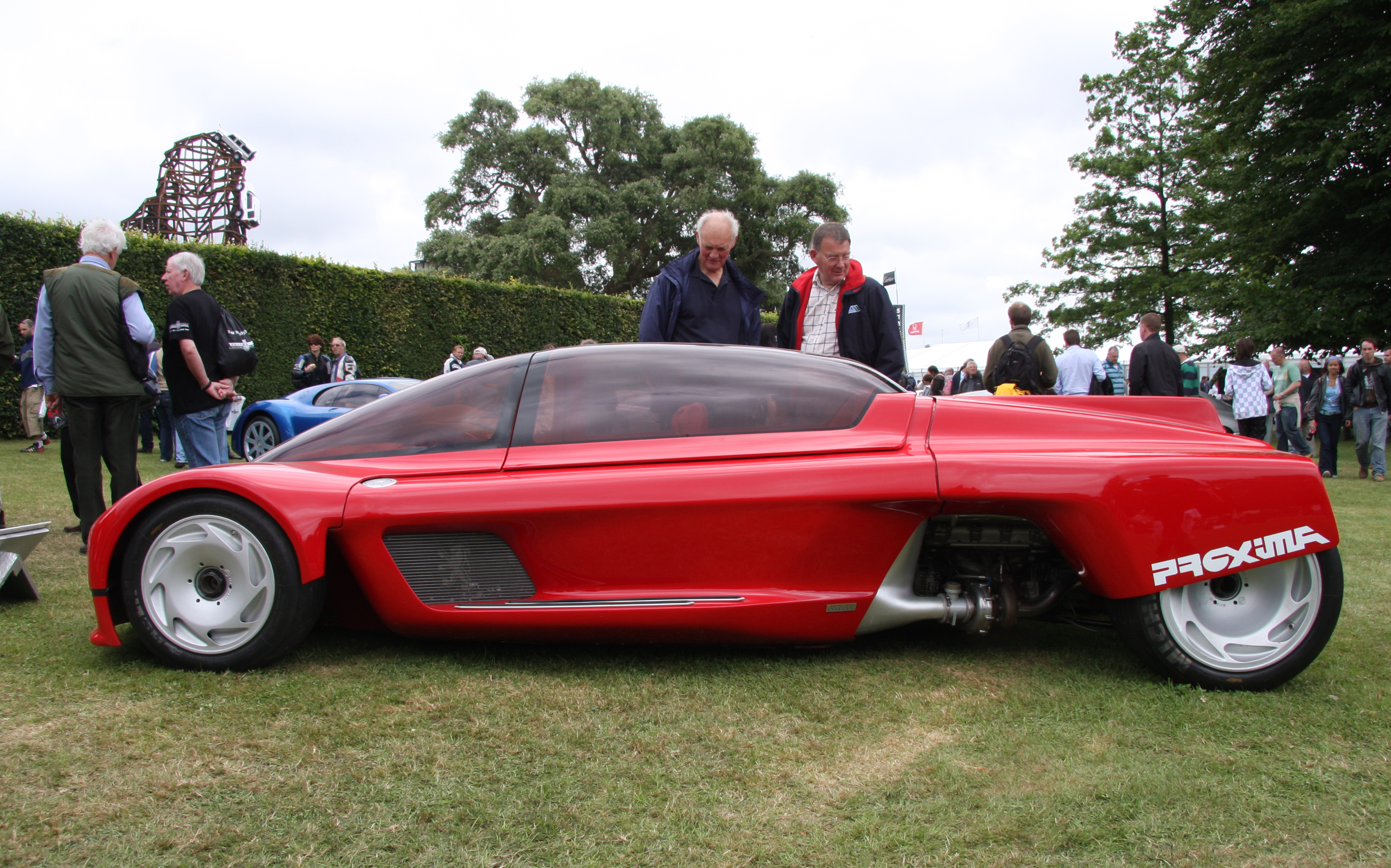
Side view

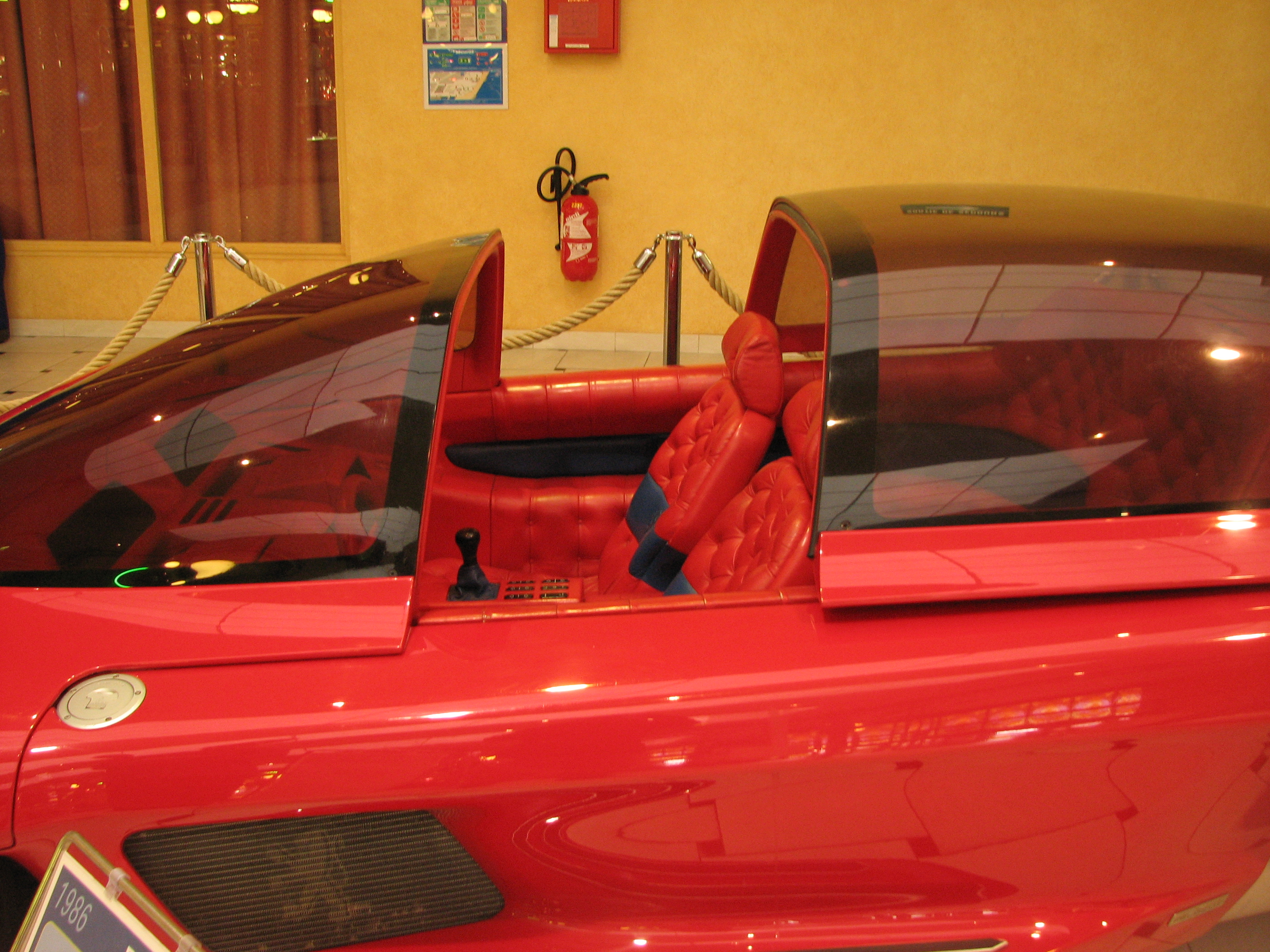
Closeup of the canopy, with the rear section slid partially backwards
