= Saab Aero-X =

Concept car built by Saab

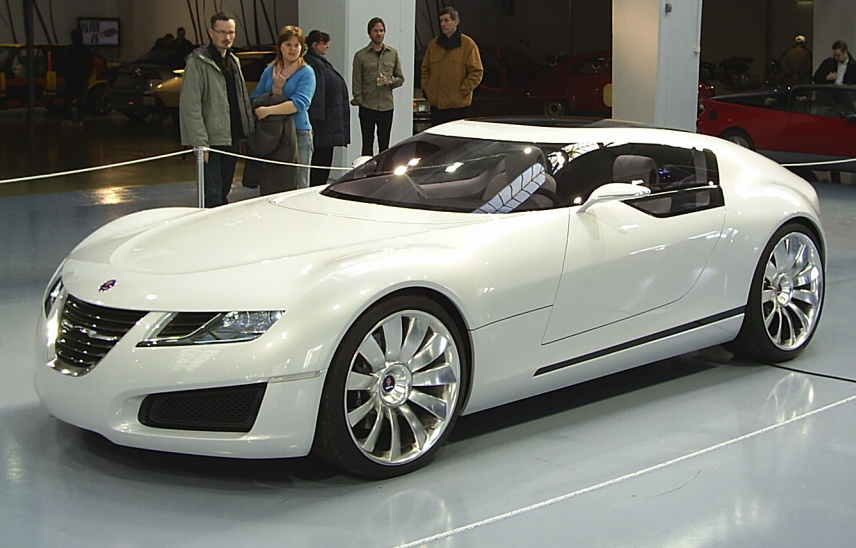

Overview
- Manufacturer: Saab Automobile
- Production: 2006 (Concept car)

Body and chassis
- Class: Sports car
- Body style: 1-door coupe
- Layout: All-wheel-drive
- Doors: Canopy doors

Powertrain
- Engine: 2.8 L twin turbocharged V6
- Transmission: 7-speed automated manual

Dimensions
- Wheelbase: 2,795 mm (110.0 in)
- Length: 4,675 mm (184.1 in)
- Width: 1,918 mm (75.5 in)
- Height: 1,276 mm (50.2 in)

The Saab Aero-X is a concept car built by Saab, which was unveiled at the 2006 Salon International de l'Auto.

It is powered by a 2.8 L twin turbocharged V6 running on pure ethanol that produces 298 kW (400 hp). The 0 to 100 km/h (62 mph) time was predicted to be 4.9 seconds and the top speed is 255 km/h (158 mph). It has a seven speed manual transmission controlled by paddles on the steering wheel.

Like the later Saab Turbo X, the Aero-X has four wheel drive. The doors and windscreen are connected, so instead of using conventional doors or even gullwing doors, it uses a cockpit canopy where the entire top section of the car is opened. This offers the Aero X's driver full 180 degree vision, and also facilitates entry and exit from its low slung cabin. The body is made of carbon fiber.

The suspension is electronically controlled. Even though it is a two seat sports car, it has reasonable storage, as the rear features two storage facilities, with a conventional hatchback and sliding drawer underneath. The interior offers "clean Scandinavian interior design". The car has no ordinary dials and buttons; instead, data is displayed on acrylic 'clear zones' in graphic 3D images. All interior and exterior lights utilize LEDs.

Although only a concept car, it has been well received, with many fans calling for its production. Victor Muller responded on the SaabsUnited.com website, saying that it is not a priority for the company right now.

"This study shows how the strength of the Saab brand heritage can inspire bold, innovative design", said Bryan Nesbitt, the Executive Director of GM Design Europe: "As we move forward with new Saab product, we will remain focused on carefully cultivating this brand equity in the context of Scandinavian design values".

"This concept shows the exciting possibilities that are open to us as we evolve a more progressive design language for the Saab brand", said Jan Åke Jonsson, Saab's Managing Director. "Our designers, engineers and marketers in Sweden are ideally placed to nurture and communicate the unique DNA of the Saab brand. Their work will ensure that future product proposals express core qualities, such as progressive design, sporty performance and emotional functionality, in a way that is specific to Saab." Elements of the cars frontal design have emerged in later Saab models, notably the design refresh of the Saab 9-3 Sports Sedan, the second generation Saab 9-5 and the Saab 9-4X.

The Aero-X was rumored to make its cinematic début in Transformers: Revenge of the Fallen, with fans speculating that it may be used for the Autobot Wheeljack. However, it was not used.

== Gallery ==
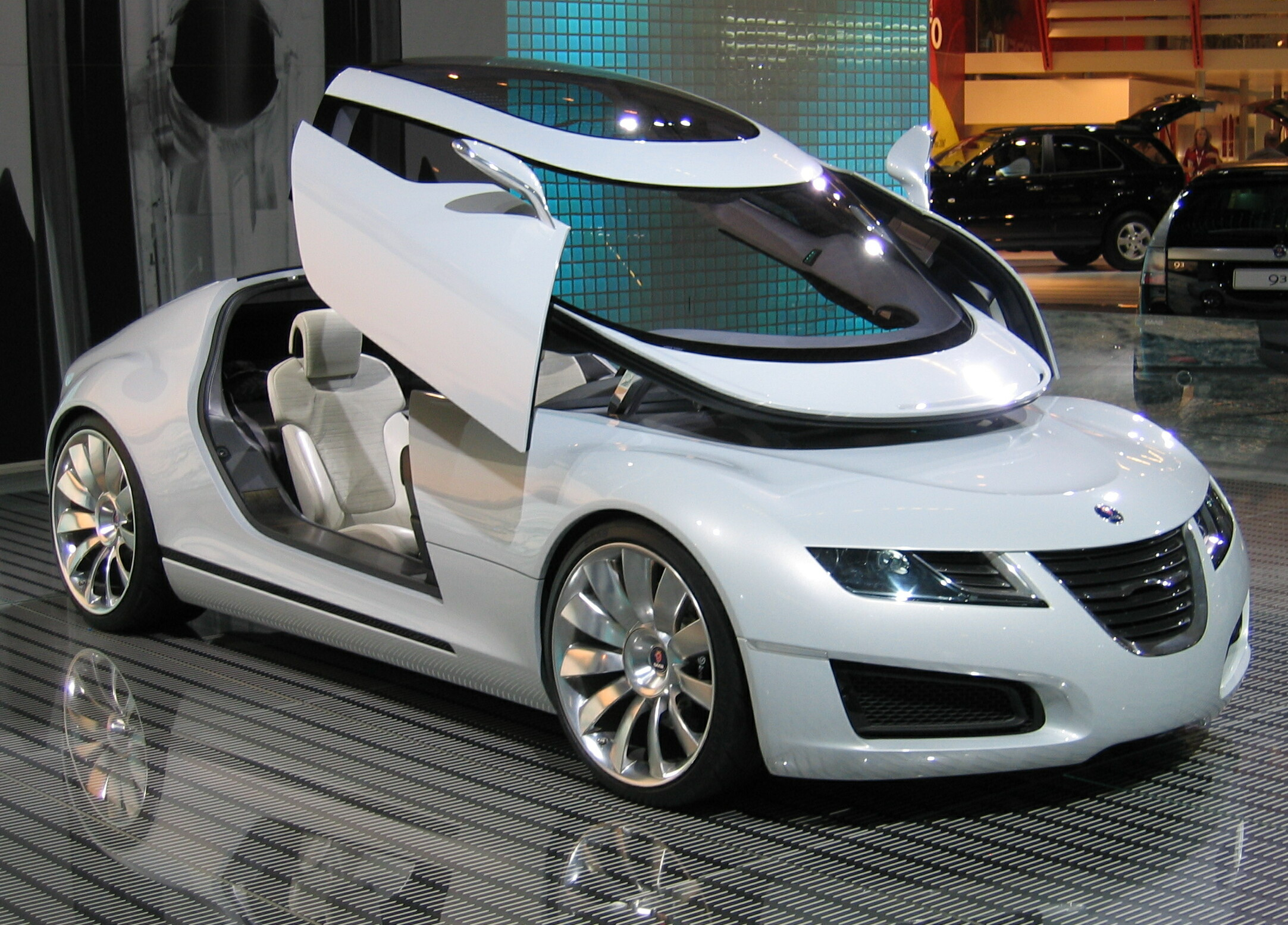
View with the canopy door open

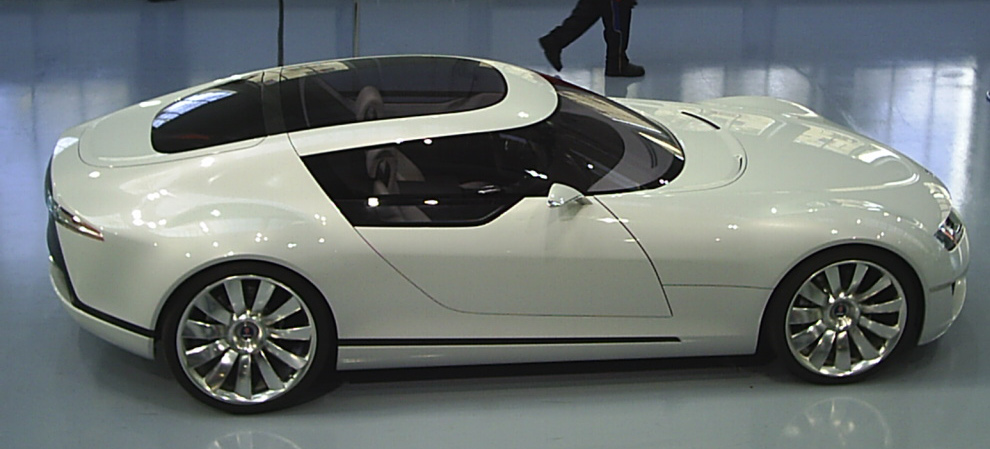
Side

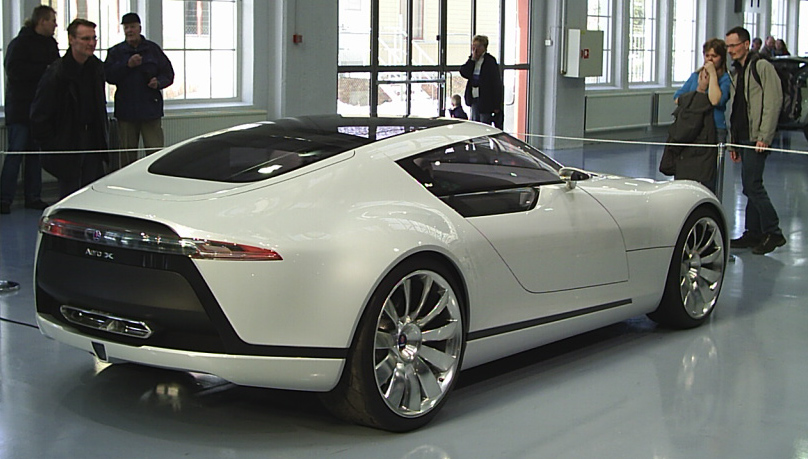
Rear

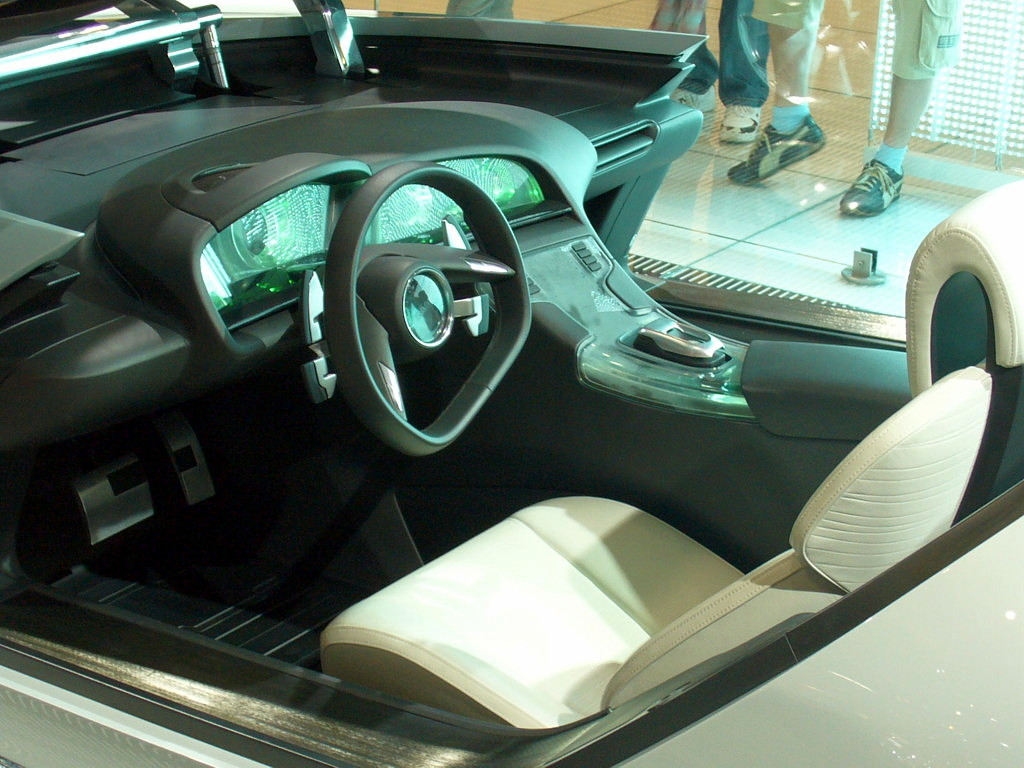
Interior
