= Ferrari Modulo =

Italian concept sports car

Ferrari 512 S Modulo
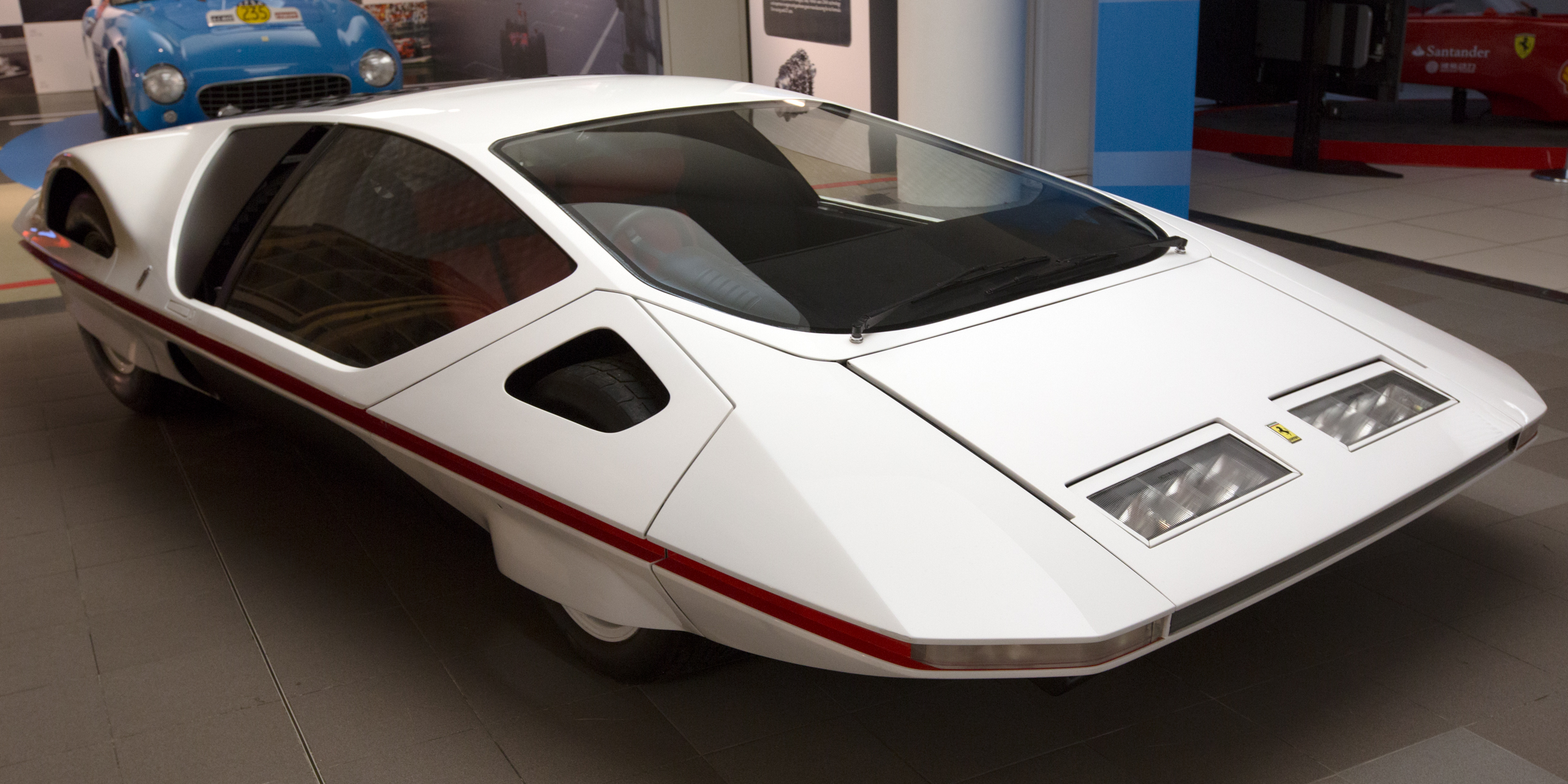

Overview
- Manufacturer: Ferrari
- Production: 1970; 1 unit
- Designer: Paolo Martin at Pininfarina

Body and chassis
- Class: Concept sports car
- Body style: Coupé
- Layout: Rear mid-engine, rear-wheel-drive
- Doors: Sliding canopy
- Related: Ferrari 512 S

Powertrain
- Engine: 5.0 L V12
- Power output: 550 hp (410 kW)
- Transmission: 5-speed manual

Dimensions
- Wheelbase: 2405 mm (94.7 in)
- Length: 4480 mm (176.4 in)
- Width: 2040 mm (80.3 in)
- Height: 935 mm (36.8 in)
- Curb weight: 900 kg (1984 lb)

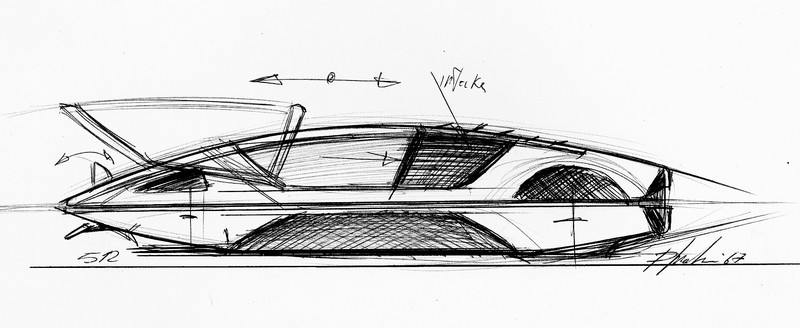
Modulo design sketch

The Ferrari 512 S Modulo is a concept sports car designed by Paolo Martin of the Italian carrozzeria Pininfarina, unveiled at the 1970 Geneva Motor Show.

== Description ==
The Modulo has an extremely low and wedge-shaped body, with a canopy-style glass roof that slides forward to permit entry to the cabin of the car. All four wheels are partly covered. Another special feature of the design are 24 holes in the engine cover that reveal the Ferrari V12 engine which develops 550 hp (410 kW) to propel the Modulo to a top speed of around 220 mph (354 km/h) and from 0–60 mph (97 km/h) in approximately 3.0 seconds.

== History ==
The Modulo originally started out as a Ferrari 512 S (chassis and engine #27)

was converted to 612 Can Am spec. After testing, the engine and transmission were removed and the chassis was stripped down and given to Pininfarina to build a show car. The show car debuted at the 1970 Geneva Motor Show and was originally painted black, but was later repainted white. The Modulo was well received by critics and has won 22 awards for its design.

In 2014, Pininfarina sold the Modulo to American entrepreneur and automotive aficionado James Glickenhaus who is restoring it to full operating condition.

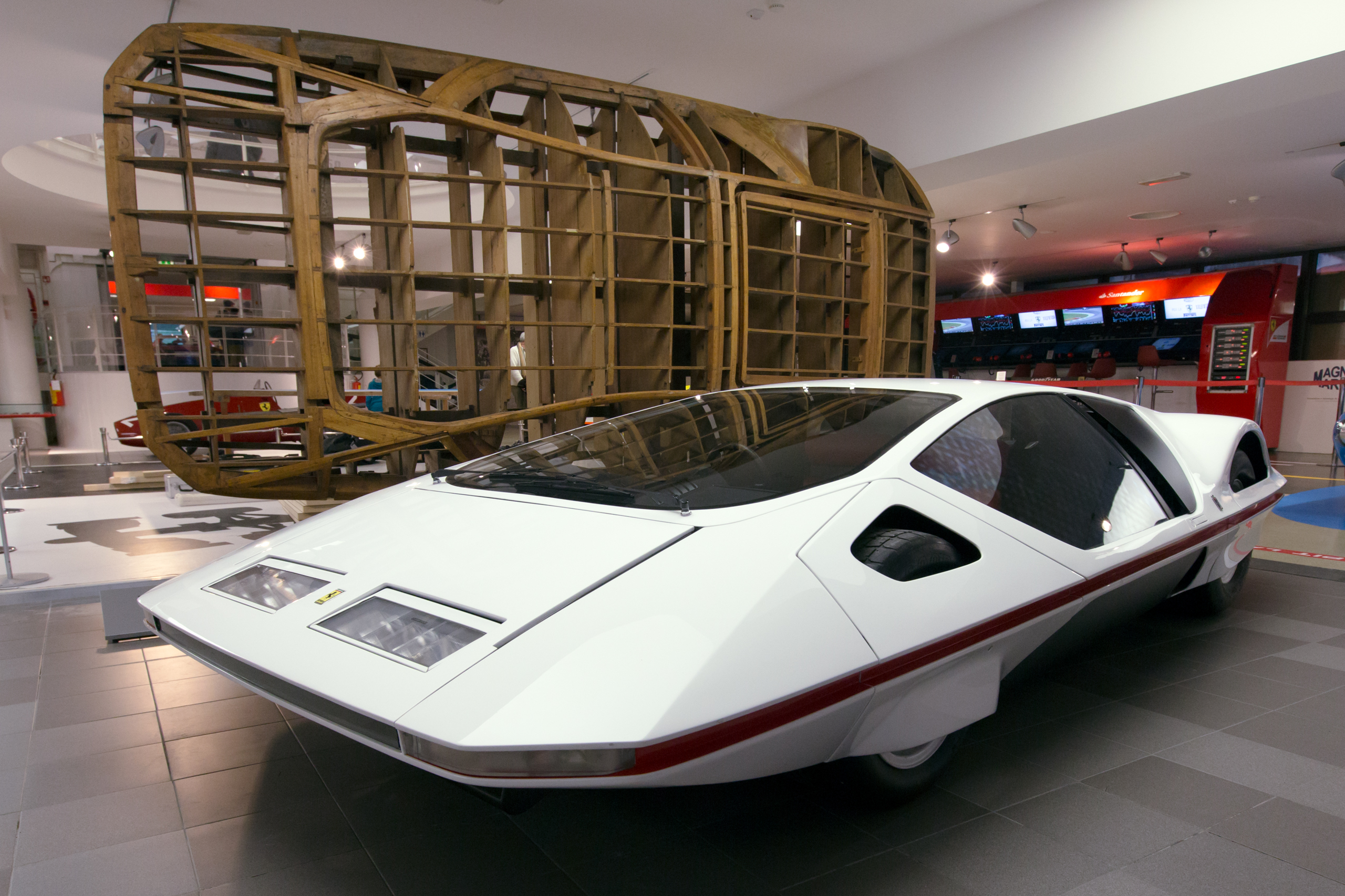
Modulo and its wooden form, used to make the body panels.

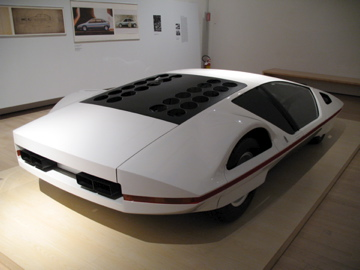
Rear view

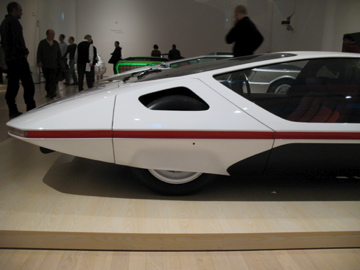
Side view

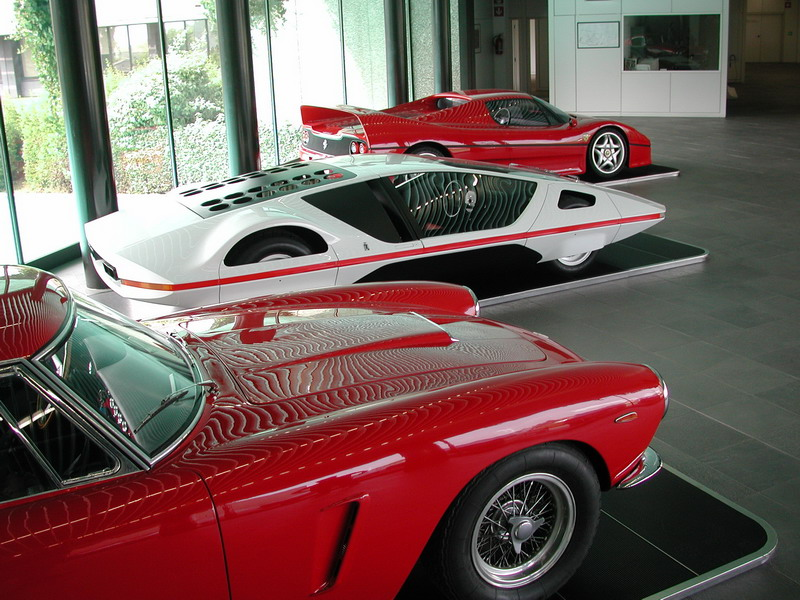
Museum of Pininfarina

== See also ==
- Canopy door
