= Miami International Auto Show =

Annual American auto show

The Miami International Auto Show (known as the South Florida Auto Show until 2012) is an American auto show which has been held annually in Miami Beach, Florida since 1971. Although the exact date varies, it often falls between the final week of October and the first week of December. The event showcases upcoming automobiles, such as trucks, SUVs, and cars. The show also may allow attendees to test drive new vehicles.

The event lasts 10 days and has an average of 650,000 visitors annually, making it one of the highest-attended auto shows in the United States. The show is the first-scheduled of the "A-sized category" automobile shows in the United States.

In 2017, the Miami International Auto Show was cancelled due to Hurricane Irma.

== Debuts ==
The following vehicles have had their worldwide or North American debut at the auto show:

=== 1990s ===
- 1990 Saturn
- 1994 Honda Passport
- 1999 Ford Explorer Sport
- 1999 Ford Explorer Sport Trac
- 1999 Ford Excursion

=== 2000s ===
- 2000 Daewoo Nubira
- 2000 Saab 9-3 Viggen
- 2000 Saab 9-5
- 2000 Toyota MR2
- 2001 Saturn Vue
- 2002 Hyundai Tiburon
- 2002 Pontiac Vibe
- 2004 Land Rover Freelander SE3
- 2004 Lincoln Mark LT
- 2004 Lexus GX470
- 2004 Maserati Coupé
- 2004 Mercedes-Benz SLK
- 2004 Subaru B9 Tribeca
- 2004 Volvo S60 R
- 2004 Volvo XC90
- 2005 Cadillac Escalade
- 2005 Ford Explorer
- 2005 Subaru Legacy 2.5GT spec.B
- 2006 Chevrolet HHR Panel Van
- 2006 Hyundai Azera
- 2006 Mercury Mariner
- 2007 Mercedes-Benz CL-Class
- 2007 Cadillac Escalade Hybrid
- 2009 Saab 9-5
- 2009 Jaguar XJ
- 2009 Volvo C30
- 2009 Volvo C70
