= Saab 9-5 =

Swedish executive car (1997–2012)

- 2003 Saab 9-5 Griffin

Overview
- Manufacturer: Saab Automobile
- Production: 1997–2012
- Assembly: Sweden: Trollhättan (Trollhättan Assembly)

Body and chassis
- Class: Executive car (E)
- Body style: 4-door sedan; 5-door station wagon
- Layout: Transverse front-engine, front-wheel drive (1997–2012); Transverse front-engine, four-wheel drive (2010–2012)

Chronology
- Predecessor: Saab 9000

The Saab 9-5 is an executive car, manufactured and marketed by Saab from 1997 to 2012, across two generations.

The first generation 9-5 was introduced in 1997 for the 1998 model year, as the replacement of the Saab 9000. At the time, the car represented a significant development for the manufacturer. In the United States, the 9-5 was introduced in the spring of 1998, for the 1999 model year.

The second generation was presented at the Frankfurt Motor Show on September 15, 2009 and production began in March 2010. It was the first Saab automobile launched under Spyker Cars' ownership, though developed almost entirely under GM's ownership. Production ceased in 2012 amid Saab's liquidation.

== Overview ==
Saab badged the model as the Saab 9^{5}, but consistently advertised it as the Saab 9-5, pronounced "nine five" rather than "ninety-five". This model should not be confused with the Saab 95, manufactured from 1959 to 1978.

The first generation 9-5 was available with sedan and station wagon body styles. Aerodynamically, the sedan's drag coefficient is 0.29, and the station wagon's is 0.31 (0.33 for the U.S. version). Introduced in 1999, the wagon features innovations such as floor tracks to secure cargo and a sliding load floor to make loading easier.

The 9-5 was the first production vehicle to offer ventilated seats, as well as asymmetrical turbocharging in the case of the 3.0L V6 engine.

The last 9-5 sedan of the first generation rolled off the Trollhättan production line at the beginning of July 2009, and the last wagon was assembled on February 1, 2010. Between the summer of 1997, when 9-5 production began, and 2010, 252,236 sedans, and 231,357 wagons were built. The total production 483,593 units, was narrowly beaten by its predecessor, the 9000, of which 503,000 were built.

Production equipment for the first-generation 9-5 was sold by General Motors to BAIC Group of China in 2009.

== First generation (YS3E, 1997–2010) ==
First generation (YS3E)
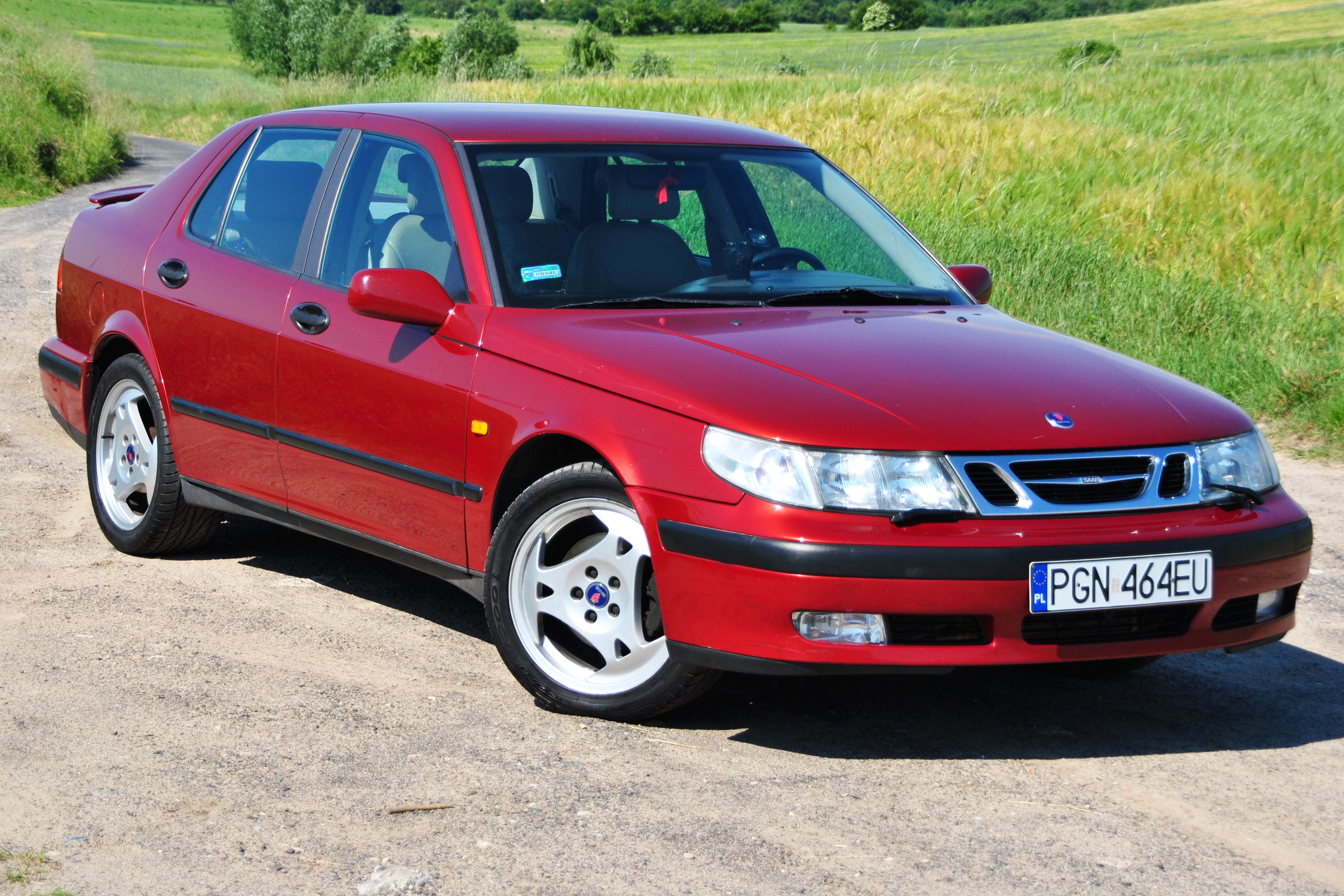

Overview
- Production: 1997–2009 (sedan); 1998–2010 (wagon)
- Designer: Einar Hareide

Body and chassis
- Layout: Transverse front-engine, front-wheel drive
- Platform: GM2900
- Related: Senova D Series; Opel Vectra; Opel Calibra; Saab 900 (NG); Saab 9-3; Saturn L-Series

Powertrain
- Engine: Petrol: 2.0 L B205 turbo I4; 2.3 L B235 turbo I4; 3.0 L GM B308E turbo V6; Diesel: 1.9 L Fiat JTD Turbodiesel I4; 2.2 L GM D223 Turbodiesel I4; 3.0 L Isuzu 6DE1 Turbodiesel V6
- Transmission: 4-speed Aisin 50-42LE automatic (1997–2001); 5-speed Aisin AF33 automatic (2002–2009); 5-speed FM55B03 manual

Dimensions
- Wheelbase: 2,703 mm (106.4 in)
- Length: 1997–2000 Sedan: 4,805 mm (189.2 in); 1998–2000 Wagon: 4,808 mm (189.3 in); 2001–05 Sedan: 4,825 mm (190.0 in); 2001–05 Wagon: 4,830 mm (190.2 in); 2006–09 Sedan: 4,836 mm (190.4 in); 2006–09 Wagon: 4,841 mm (190.6 in)
- Width: 1997–2000 Sedan: 1,793 mm (70.6 in); Wagon & 2001–09 Sedan: 1,790 mm (70.5 in)
- Height: 1997–2005 Sedan, 2001–2005 Wagon: 1,448 mm (57.0 in); 1998–2000 Wagon: 1,496 mm (58.9 in); 2006–2009 Sedan: 1,453 mm (57.2 in); 2006–2009 Wagon: 1,465 mm (57.7 in)

=== Engines ===
The first-generation 9-5 is powered by Saab's B205 and B235 straight-4 engines, and from 2002 in Europe by an Opel Ecotec X22DTH 2.2 diesel engine (Saab D223L), replaced in 2006 by Fiat's 1.9 JTD 16V diesel engine. A turbocharged version of the General Motors 54° V6 engine, designated by Saab as B308, has a unique asymmetrical low-pressure turbocharger and was available from 1999 to 2003. This engine is available only with an automatic transmission, and cars with this engine installed are distinguishable by their twin tailpipes. The V6 was only available on Arc, SE, and Griffin models. In 2004, the V6 engine was replaced by a high-pressure turbo straight-4 engine rated at 220 hp (164 kW). By 2006 this engine was rated at 260 hp (194 kW) even in the non-Aero or non-sport models made for the US market.

The B2x5 engines can suffer from oil pickup issues caused by 'oil sludge' in the lubrication circuit. In 1999, Saab issued a Workshop Bulletin around this issue. The 'sludge' issue primarily affected earlier models between 1999 and 2003, and from 2004 a revised engine positive crankcase ventilation system (PCV) and the use of fully synthetic oil were introduced.

Saab created retrofit kits for the earlier 1999–2003 cars as the PCV design differs from the 2004 and later system. In 2005, Saab extended the warranty on the B2x5 engine to eight years and unlimited miles from new for original owners, provided the owner could produce proof that they had followed the manufacturer's oil change intervals. Saab recommended the use of fully synthetic or synthetic-blend oil as a preventative measure.

==== Engine choices ====
Model	Years	Engine	Engine type	Displ.	Max. power	Max. torque	0–100 km/h (0-62 mph) (seconds)
1.9TiD	2006–2009	Fiat JTD Z19DTH	I4, diesel	1,910 cc	150 PS (110 kW; 148 hp) at 4,000 rpm	320 N⋅m (236 lbf⋅ft) at 2,000 rpm	10.1 (10.7)
1.9TiD Hirsch	2009	Fiat JTD Z19DTH	I4, diesel	1,910 cc	175 PS (129 kW; 173 hp) at 4,000 rpm	350 N⋅m (258 lbf⋅ft) at 2,000 rpm	(10.5)
2.2TiD	2002–2005	Opel Ecotec Y22DTH	I4, diesel	2,171 cc	120 PS (88 kW; 118 hp) at 4,000 rpm	280 N⋅m (207 lbf⋅ft) at 1,500 rpm	11.0
3.0 V6TiD	2002-2005	Isuzu DMAX D308L	V6, diesel	2,958 cc	177 PS (130 kW; 175 hp) at 4,000 rpm	350 N⋅m (258 lbf⋅ft) at 1,800 rpm	8.9
2.0t	1998–2009	B205E	I4, petrol	1,985 cc	150 PS (110 kW; 148 hp) at 5,500 rpm	240 N⋅m (177 lbf⋅ft) at 1,800 rpm	9.8 (10.2)
2.0t (SAAB tuned)	1998–2009	B205L	I4, petrol	1,985 cc	192 PS (141 kW; 189 hp) at 5,500 rpm	310 N⋅m (229 lbf⋅ft) at 1,700 rpm	8.1
2.0t BioPower	2005–2009	B205E	I4, E85 or petrol	1,985 cc	180 PS (132 kW; 178 hp) at 5,500 rpm	280 N⋅m (207 lbf⋅ft) at 1,800 rpm	8.5 (9.0)
2.3t BioPower	2006–2009	B235E	I4, E85 or petrol	2,290 cc	210 PS (154 kW; 207 hp) at 5,500 rpm	310 N⋅m (229 lbf⋅ft) at 1,800 rpm	7.9 (8.5)
2.3t	1998–2001	B235E	I4, petrol	2,290 cc	170 PS (125 kW; 168 hp) at 5,500 rpm	280 N⋅m (207 lbf⋅ft) at 1,800 rpm	8.7 (9.3)
2.3t	2002–2009	B235E	I4, petrol	2,290 cc	185 PS (136 kW; 182 hp) at 5,500 rpm	280 N⋅m (207 lbf⋅ft) at 1,800 rpm	7.9 (8.5)
2.3T	2004–2005	B235L	I4, petrol	2,290 cc	220 PS (162 kW; 217 hp) at 5,500 rpm	310 N⋅m (229 lbf⋅ft) at 2,500 rpm	7.9 (8.5)
3.0 V6	1998–2003	B308E	V6, petrol	2,962 cc	200 PS (147 kW; 197 hp) at 5,000 rpm	310 N⋅m (229 lbf⋅ft) at 2,500 rpm	8.3 (auto)
Aero	1999–2001	B235R	I4, petrol	2,290 cc	230 PS (169 kW; 227 hp) at 5,500 rpm	370 N⋅m (273 lbf⋅ft) at 1,900 rpm	6.9
Aero	2002–2005	B235R	I4, petrol	2,290 cc	250 PS (184 kW; 247 hp) at 5,300 rpm	370 N⋅m (273 lbf⋅ft) at 1,900 rpm	6.9 (8.2)
2.3T/Aero	2006–2009	B235R	I4, petrol	2,290 cc	260 PS (191 kW; 256 hp) at 5,300 rpm	370 N⋅m (273 lbf⋅ft) at 1,900 rpm	6.5
Aero Hirsch	2002–2005	B235R	I4, petrol	2,290 cc	305 PS (224 kW; 301 hp) at 5,300 rpm	400 N⋅m (295 lbf⋅ft) at 1,900 rpm	6.3
Aero Hirsch	2006–2009	B235R	I4, petrol	2,290 cc	310 PS (228 kW; 306 hp) at 5,300 rpm	410 N⋅m (302 lbf⋅ft) at 1,900 rpm	6.0

=== Transmissions ===
The 9-5 is available with an Aisin AW 4-speed (50-42LE) automatic transmission Saab reference FA47; from 1997 until 2001, when a new Aisin AW unit replaced the aging four-speed automatic with a five-speed automatic. A five-speed manual transmission is fitted as standard to the base models and the Aero.

=== Alternative propulsion ===
==== E85 ====
In 2005, an updated version of the 2.0 L turbocharged 4-cylinder engine was introduced in the European market together with the 2006 9-5. The engine was sold as 2.0t BioPower, optimized to run on E85 producing 180 PS (178 hp; 132 kW) at 5,500 rpm. There was also a 2.3T BioPower version sold from 2007. It was also introduced in Australia.

==== E100 ====
In 2007, Saab presented a 9-5 E100 Concept, based on the turbo 2.0. Offering a claimed 300 PS (296 hp; 221 kW) and 400 N⋅m (295 lb⋅ft) of torque, the Concept included the use of increased boost pressure and compression ratio.

=== Safety ===
The 9-5 introduced Saab's Active Head Restraints (SAHR), which moved up and forward to prevent whiplash when the car was struck from the rear. This feature won technology and safety awards in Australia, Denmark, and the United Kingdom. The Saab 9-5 also was one of the first cars to have extensive side-crash protection.

The front seats featured torso airbags and head airbags even on the earliest models, which few contemporary vehicles did in the late 1990s. The basic structure included a robust passenger safety cage, front and rear deformation zones, reinforced door posts and pillars, as well as the "Pendulum B-Pillar", which combined high-strength low-alloy steel at chest and head height with tailored blank steel at the floorpan, designed to direct the crash forces down toward the floor. The design was proven by the Insurance Institute for Highway Safety (IIHS) to protect occupants in side crashes, even without the addition of curtain airbags or rear side airbags. From 2002, ESP (electronic stability control) was included as standard.

Another Saab feature, the "Night Panel", permitted dousing of the instrument panel lighting, except for essential information, for less distraction when driving at night. Once activated, only essential information such as current speed is displayed except, for example, if the car requires fuel or the engine overheats.

In the United States OnStar was available, and provided as standard equipment in selected 9-5's from 2001 onward.

ANCAP test results* Saab 9-5 (2004)
Test	Score
Overall	5 /5 stars
Frontal offset	12.56/16
Side impact	16/16
Pole	2/2
Seat belt reminders	2/3
Whiplash protection	Not Assessed
Pedestrian protection	Not Assessed
Electronic stability control	Optional

=== Comfort ===
The 9-5 had various comfort features both as standard and cost options over the years.

While early models frequently had dash mounted cassette decks, CD changers were standard features on many cars and in-dash satellite navigation was also available. Factory-fitted phone kits were similarly optional.

Many models featured leather or part-leather upholstery and both front and rear heated seats were also available. A few models were shipped with the optional ventilated seats.

Cruise control was available on various models and xenon headlamps were fitted as standard on high-end variants.

=== Aero ===
The high-performance variant is known as 9-5 Aero.The earliest versions of which were sometimes referred to as the 'HOT' (High Output Turbo) Aero, was first released in 2000 with a 2.3T B235R engine. The B235R engine of the 9-5 Aero is capable of providing immense torque and, in terms of acceleration, outperformed the contemporary Porsche 911 Turbo from 40 to 90 mph. Initially badged as a 230 PS (169 kW; 227 hp) engine, Saab later conceded that the 230 PS power figure was quite conservative, with the manual versions rated at 250 PS and having more torque than stated. This flagship model had a long list of standard features, a sport tuned suspension, and body side moldings. In 2002 a 250 PS (184 kW; 247 hp) 2.3-litre turbocharged engine was made standard, which allowed for more torque after 4,500 rpm. All Aero models from 2002 to 2005 have an identical engine layout and management system, with the 2002–2005 models just having a slightly remapped version of that ECU from factory. The top-of-the-line 9-5 in its final model years is rated at 260 PS (191 kW; 256 hp) and 350 N⋅m (258 lbf⋅ft) of torque (370 N⋅m (273 lbf⋅ft) with its 20-second overboost function accessible on the manual transmission equipped version).

From 2006 to 2010, the 260 PS (191 kW; 256 hp) B235R was the standard engine in both the 2.3T and Aero trims. 2006 had only one badge designation, 2.3T, and appointments normally found on the Aero could be added via a "Sport Package". Since 2007, SAAB added an Aero badge to the trunk lid to distinguish from regular 2.3T models. In addition, almost all standard features on the Aero were standard on the 2.3T, the exceptions being sport-tuned chassis, two-tone leather upholstery, "Anniversary" wheels and brushed aluminum interior trim, all of which were standard on Aero and not available on the 2.3T.

=== Police car ===
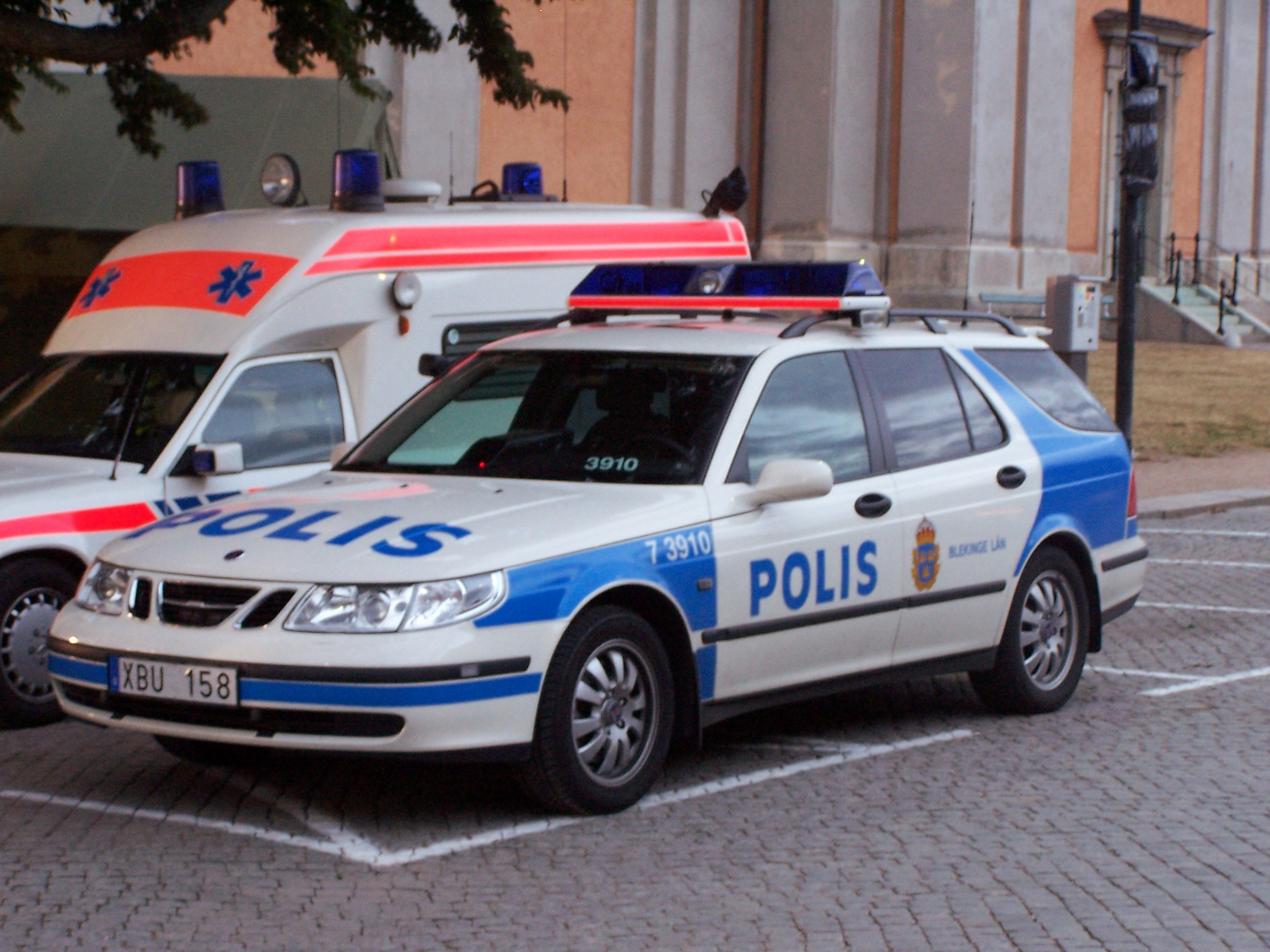
Saab 9-5 of the Swedish Police

The 9-5 was used as a liveried patrol vehicle, as well as undercover, in several parts of its native Sweden, alongside the Volvo V70. Several police forces in the UK also used the 9-5 in their fleets, mostly in Aero specification. The city of Aspen, Colorado, used Saabs as patrol cars from early 1970s until 2005, when they discontinued the 9-5 in favor of the Volvo XC90. The town of Vail, Colorado, likewise used Saabs from 1980 onwards, but in 2005, the black 9-5 patrol cars were replaced by Ford Explorers, due to budget reasons.

In 2006, Lothian and Borders Police in Edinburgh, Scotland, began operating three Saab 9-5 Aero 2.3T patrol cars as part of a fleet of 580 vehicles. These 9-5s were customised to police specifications by the Saab, Vauxhall and Chevrolet Special Vehicles Operation (SVO) in Papworth, Cambridgeshire. In undercover guise, these cars were outwardly identical to the Linear Sport models, but featured the 260 hp Aero drivetrain.

In Poland, an unmarked 9-5 is used as a video-pursuit vehicle, in the Płock area.

=== Gallery ===
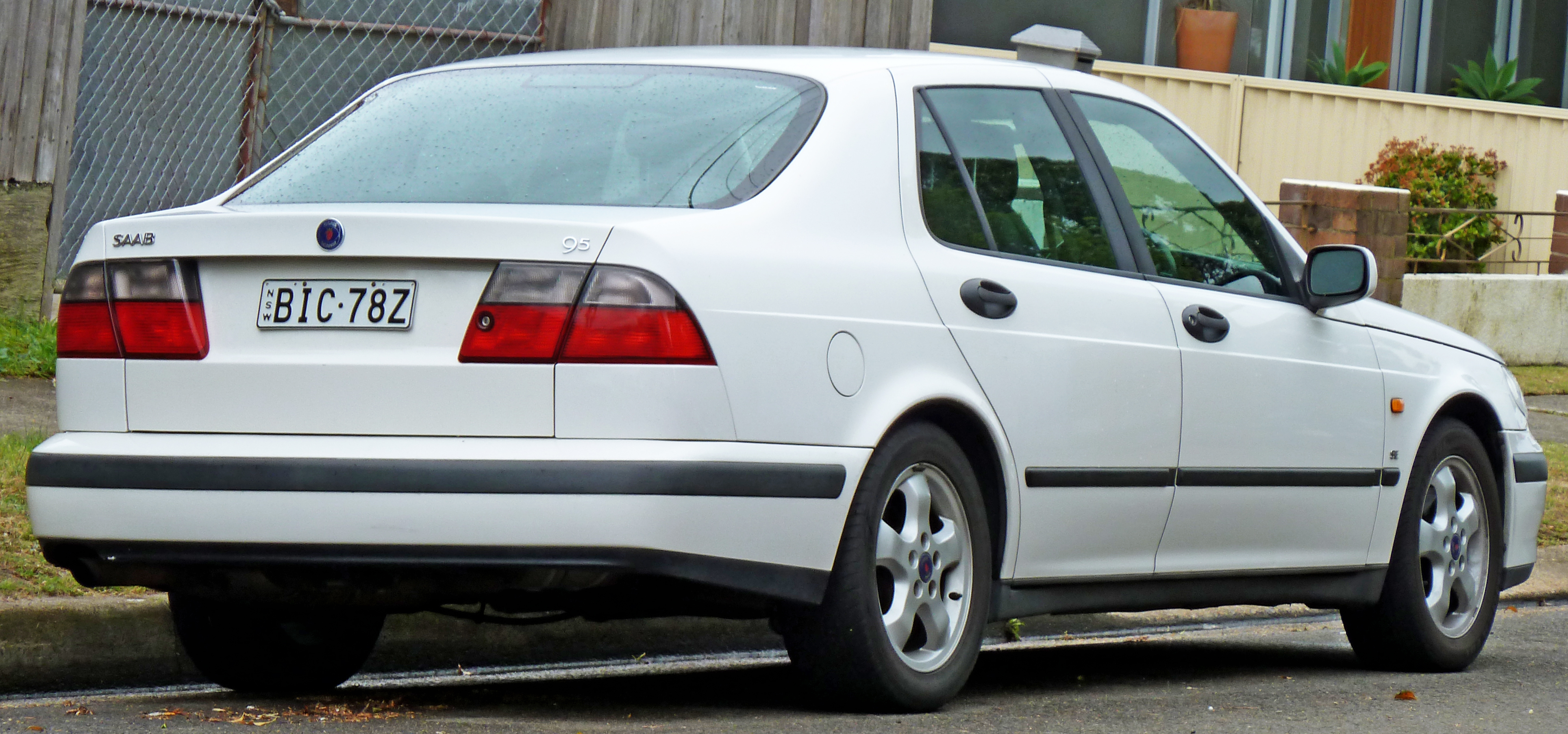
Pre–facelift Saab 9-5 SE sedan (Australia)

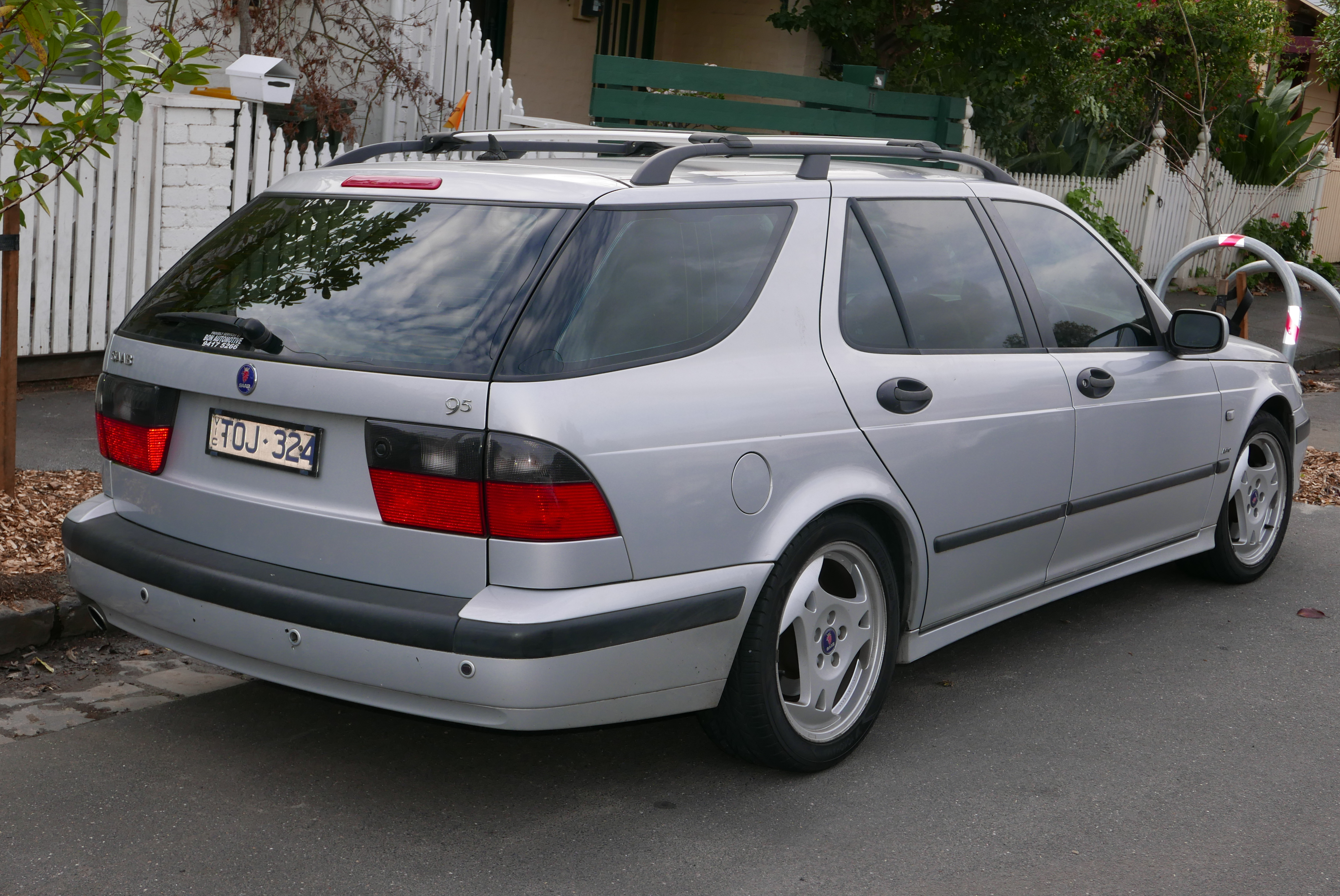
Pre–facelift Saab 9-5 Aero SportCombi (Australia)

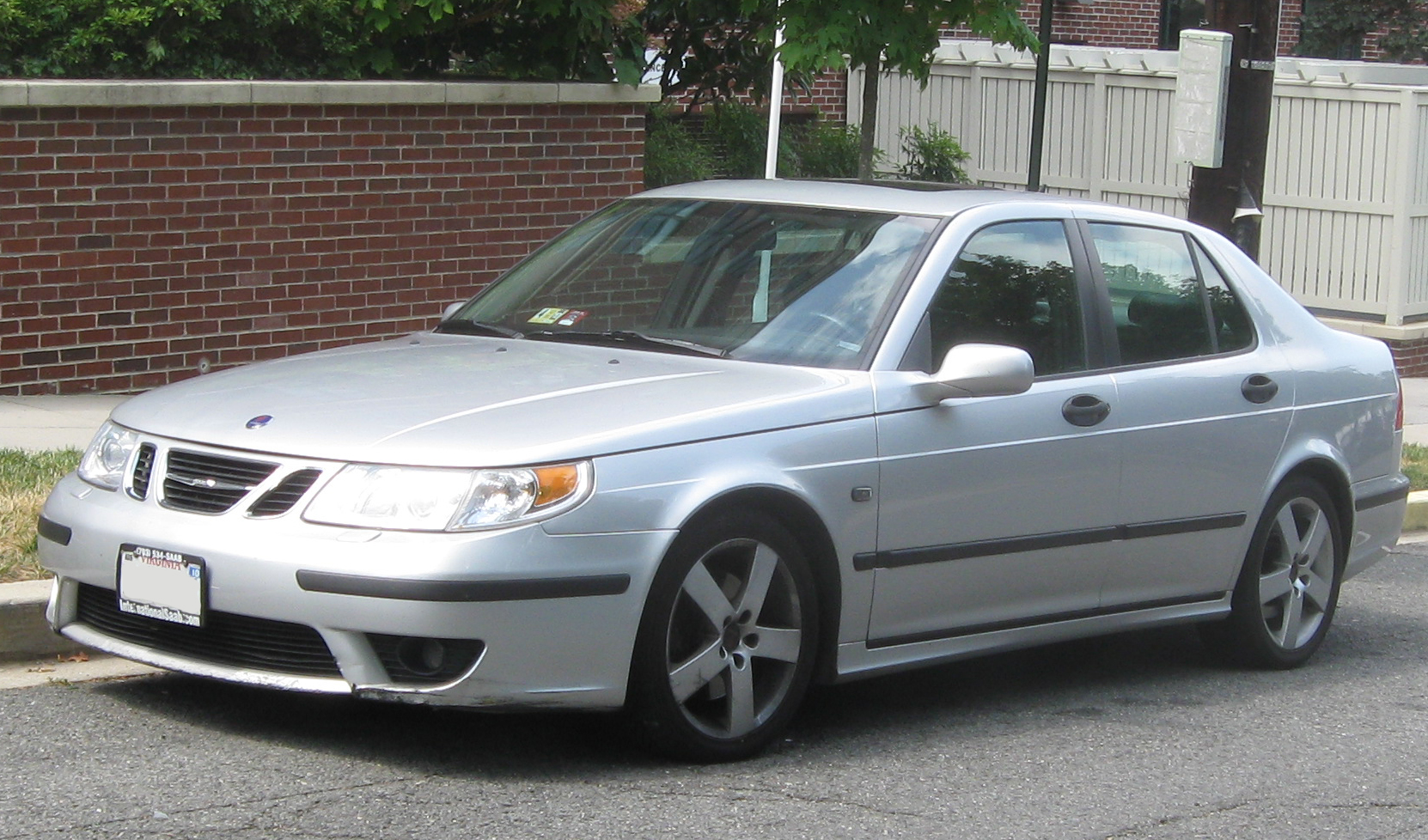
First facelift Saab 9-5 Aero sedan (US)

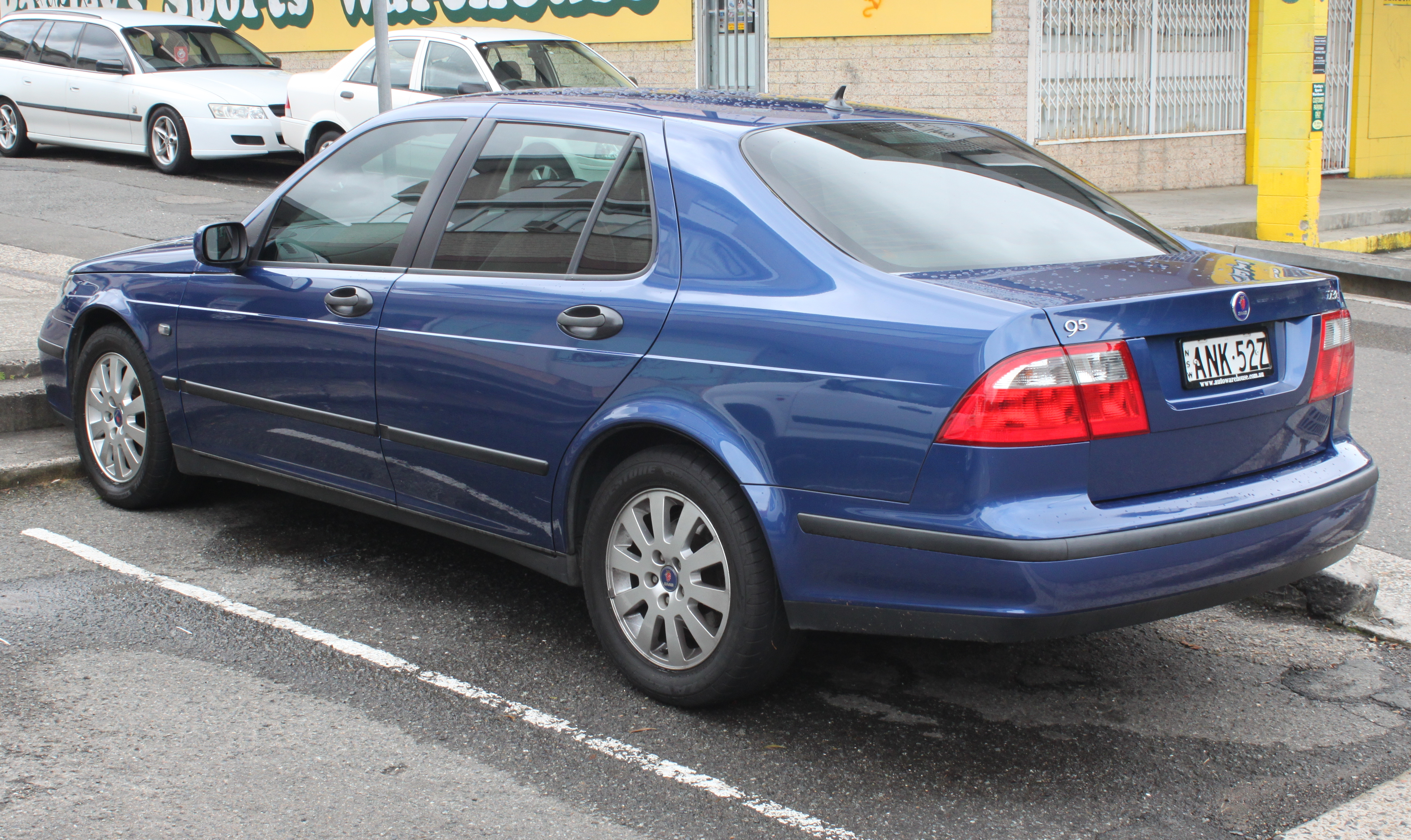
First facelift Saab 9-5 Linear 2.3t sedan (Australia)

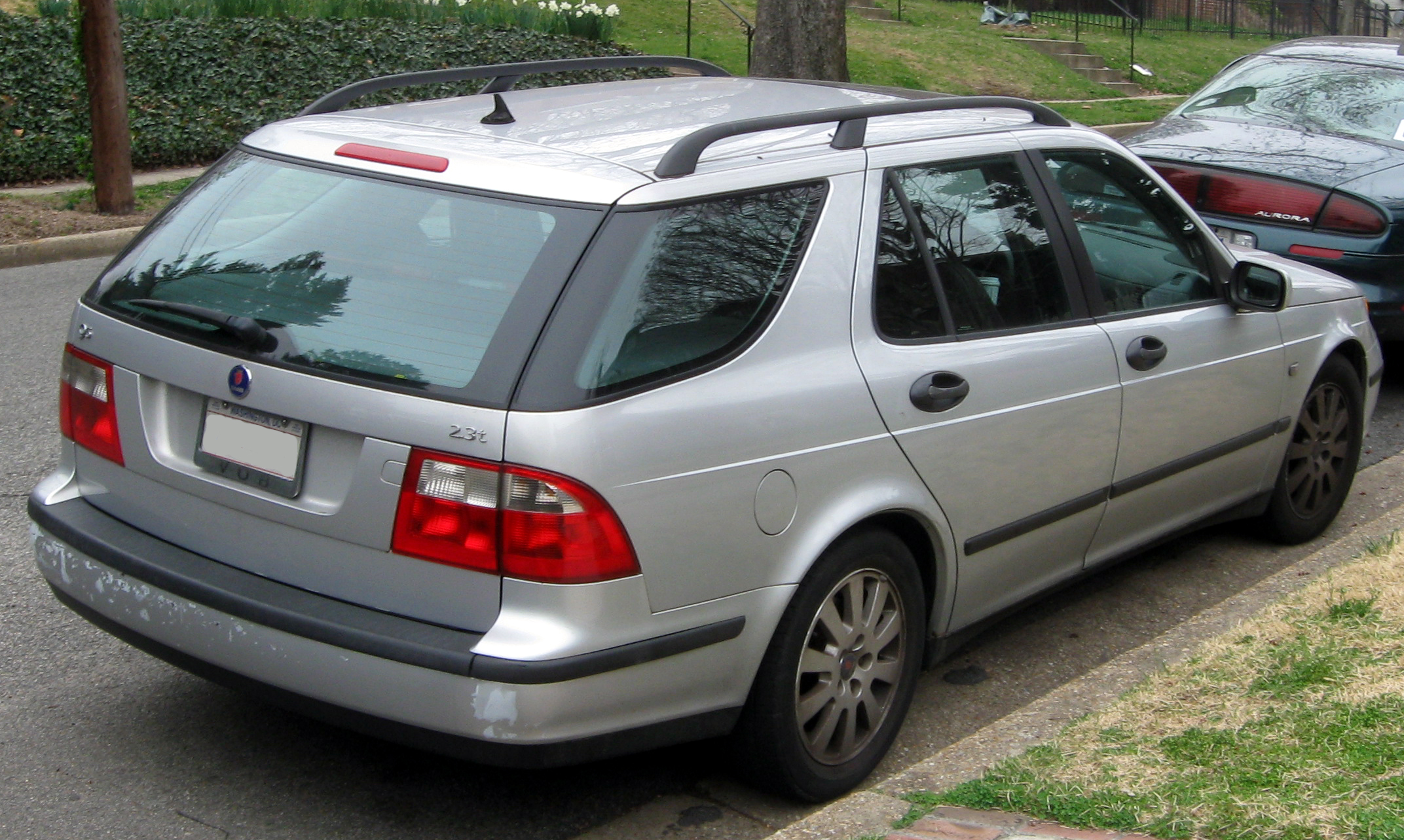
First facelift Saab 9-5 2.3t SportCombi (US)

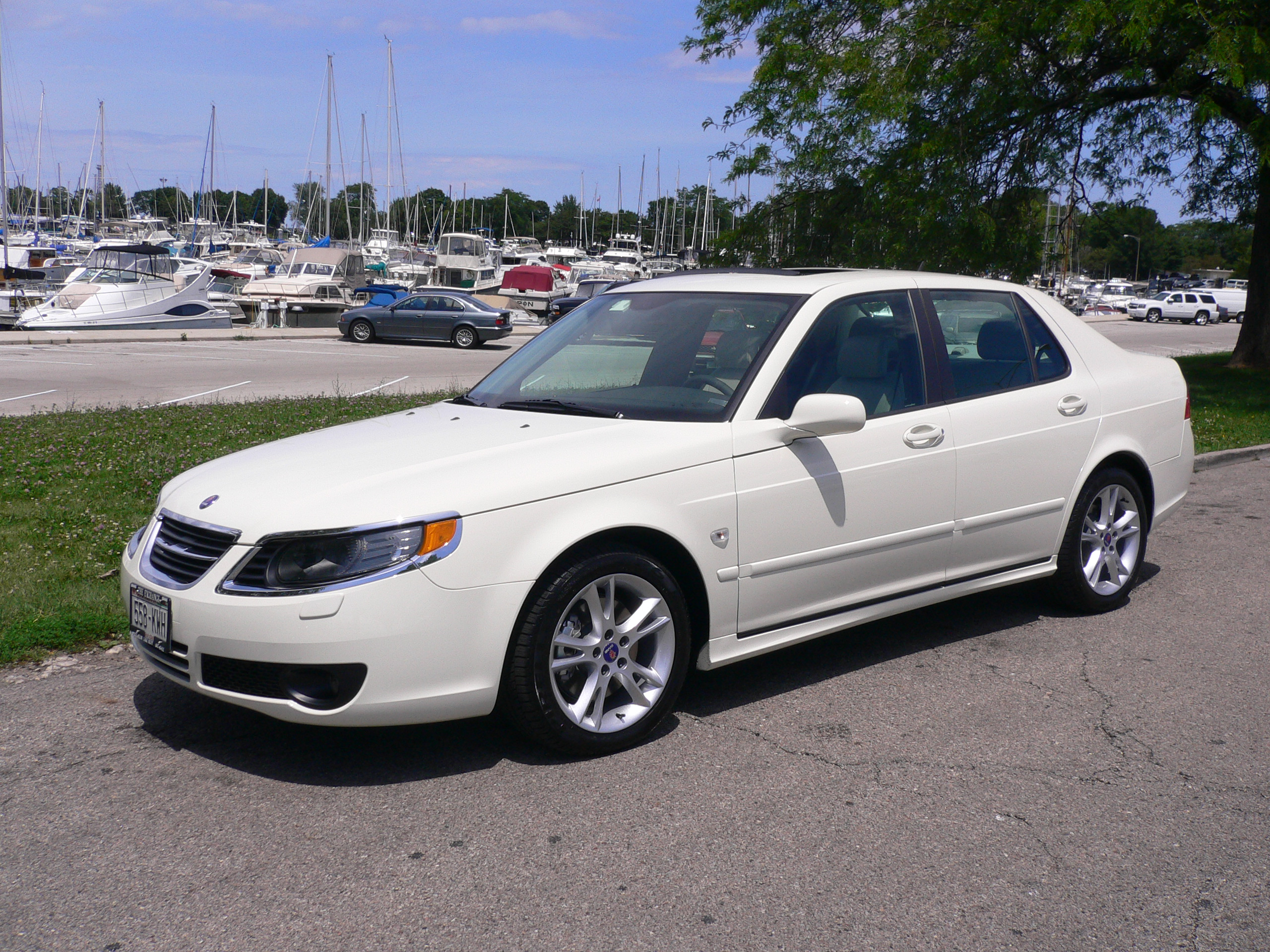
Second facelift Saab 9-5 sedan (US)

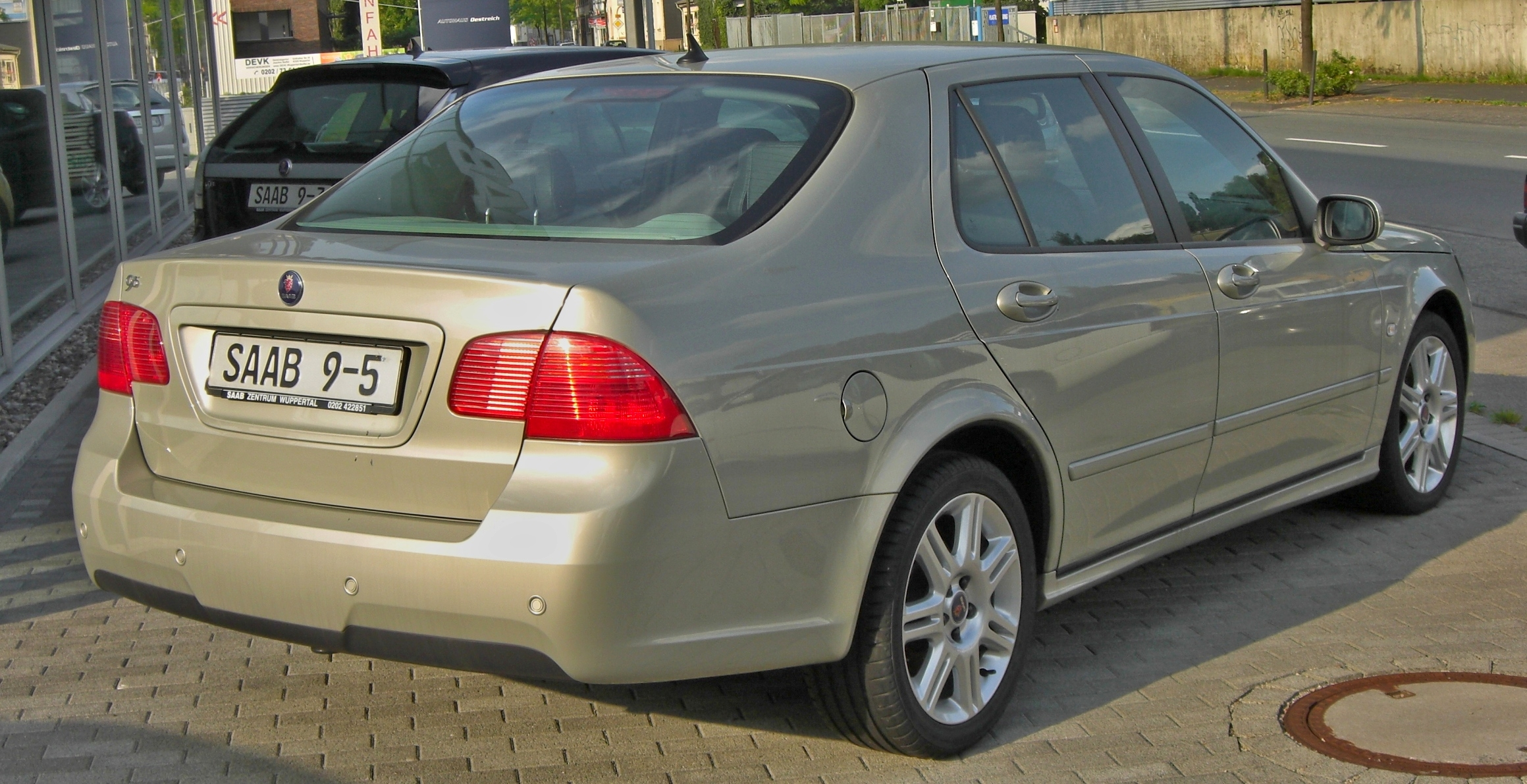
Second facelift Saab 9-5 Aero sedan (Europe)

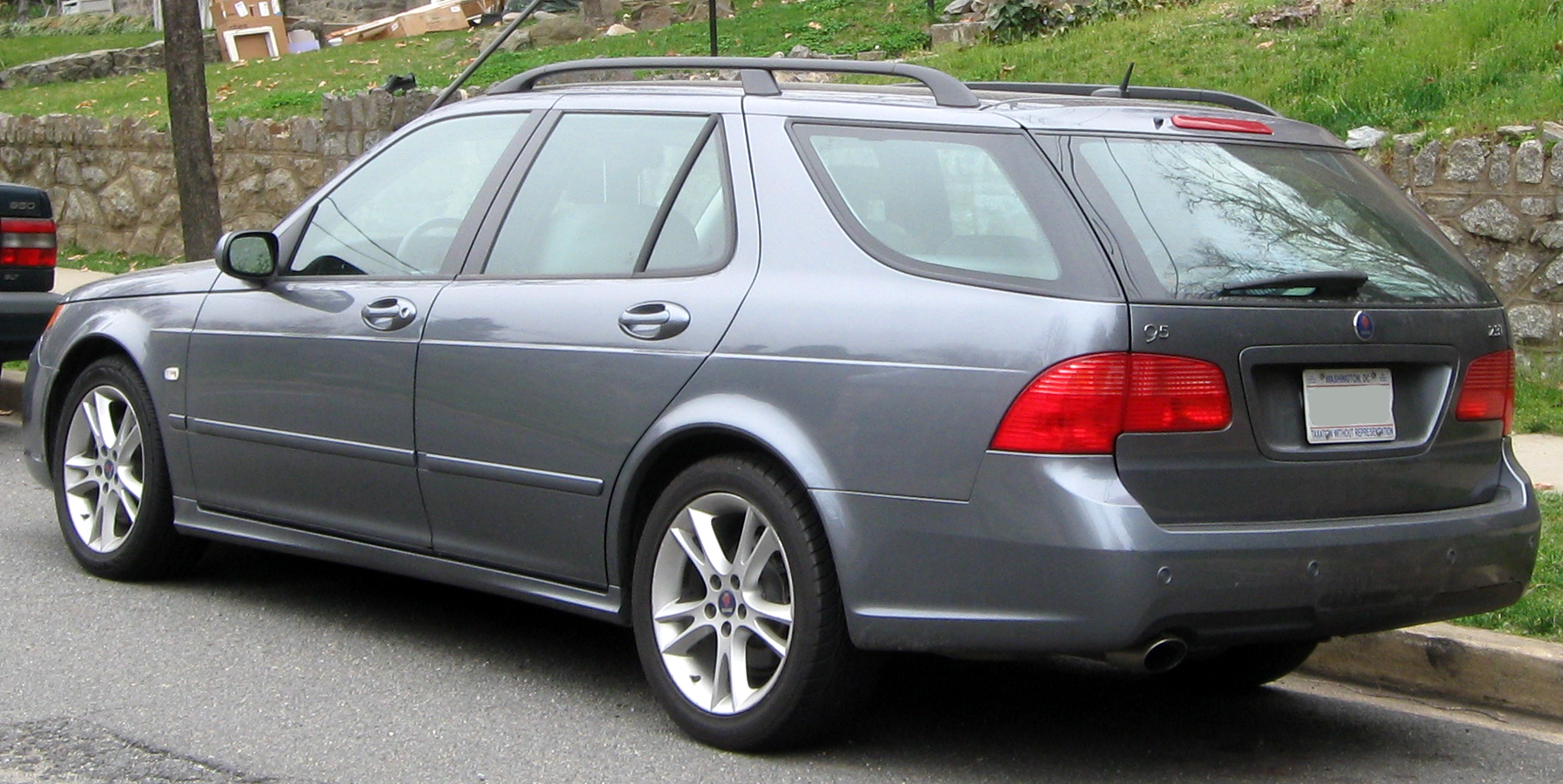
Second facelift Saab 9-5 SportCombi (US)

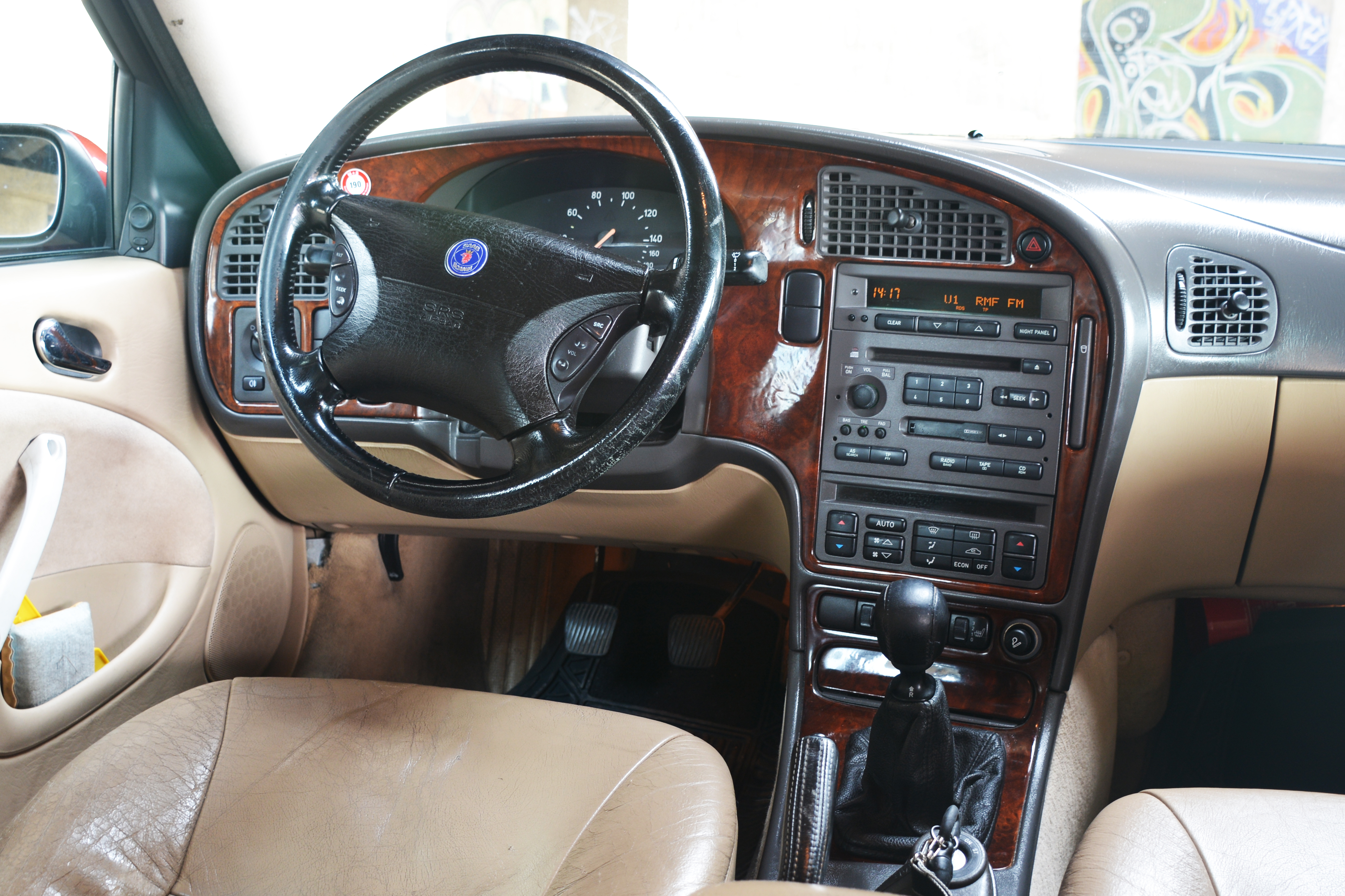
Interior

== Second generation (YS3G, 2010–2012) ==
Second generation (YS3G)
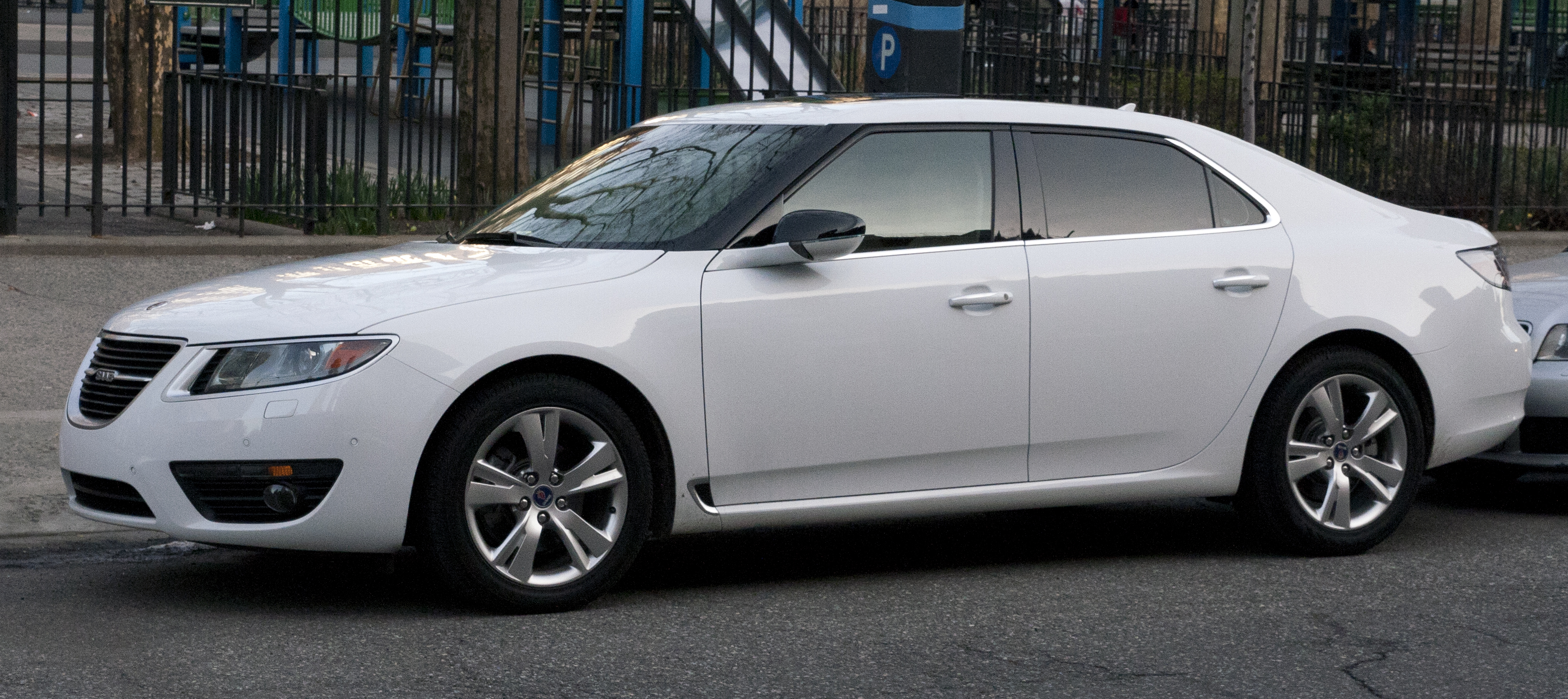

Overview
- Production: November 2009–March 2011
- Model years: 2010–2012
- Designer: Simon Padian, Anders Gustafsson

Body and chassis
- Layout: Transverse front-engine, front-wheel drive / four-wheel drive
- Platform: GM Epsilon II LWB
- Related: Chevrolet Impala; Buick LaCrosse; Cadillac XTS; Chevrolet Malibu; Opel Insignia; Buick Regal

Powertrain
- Engine: Petrol: 1.6 L Z16LET turbo I4; 2.0 L A20NHT turbo I4; 2.8 L A28NER turbo V6; Petrol/E85 Flex Fuel: 2.0 L A20NFT turbo I4; Diesel: 2.0 L turbodiesel I4
- Transmission: 6-speed manual; 6-speed Aisin AWTF-80 SC automatic

Dimensions
- Wheelbase: 2,837 mm (111.7 in)
- Length: 5,008 mm (197.2 in)
- Width: 1,868 mm (73.5 in)
- Height: 1,466 mm (57.7 in)

The second generation 9-5, built on the Global Epsilon platform was presented at the Frankfurt International Auto Show in September 2009. The vehicle had its North American debut in October 2009 at the South Florida Auto Show in Miami. On November 24, 2009, the first pre-production second generation 9-5 rolled off the Trollhättan production line.

With the announcement of the sale of Saab to Spyker on January 26, 2010, the new generation Saab 9-5 was put into production at the Saab plant in Trollhättan. Full-scale production began in April 2010, with the cars appearing in dealerships on June 19, 2010. Saab introduced a wagon variant of the new 9-5, dubbed "SportCombi," at the 2011 Geneva Motor Show. The Saab 9-5 Sedan 2.8 V6 Turbo was named Car of the Year in Singapore by "Wheels Asia".

Production of the 9-5 ended in March 2011 with Trollhättan production stopping due to the company's failing liquidity. Total production numbers of the second-generation Saab 9-5 amounted to 11,280 units.

While several prototype vehicles and a number of pre-production SportCombis were manufactured, the official variant did not enter serial production prior to Saab's bankruptcy in December 2011. A 9-5 liftback and a new 9-5X were also planned, as well as an overall facelift around mid-2014.

=== Trim levels ===
Trim/equipment levels vary from country to country.

In the US, Saab 9-5 trim levels were Turbo4, Turbo4 Premium, Turbo6 XWD, and Aero. Turbo4 models come with a turbocharged four-cylinder engine and features that included power adjustable driver and passenger seats, leather upholstery, five-spoke alloy wheels, fog lamps, and rain-sensing wipers. The Turbo4 Premium added a panoramic sunroof, headlamp washers, Saab parking assistance, keyless entry and start, memory seats, and 18-inch alloy wheels, while the Turbo6 XWD was powered by a turbocharged six-cylinder engine and features an all-wheel-drive system. The top trim Aero featured 15-spoke “Rotor” 18-inch alloy wheels, leather-trimmed sports seats, a multi-color central information display, Bi-Xenon SmartBeam headlamps, dark titanium-effect interior trim, aluminum sports pedals, a sports-tuned suspension system with real-time damping, and Aero exterior elements.

UK equipment levels for the 2012 model year included the Vector SE and Aero. The previous base models, Linear and Vector were replaced by the Vector SE model.

In Australia the base trim called Linear was not part of the line up, only the Vector and Aero trims were available.

=== Engines ===
In North America, the engine choices were either a turbocharged V6 or an Ecotec I4. Other countries also had an optional turbodiesel I4 engine. Engine performance upgrades that were available from Hirsch Performance (Saab's only factory approved tuner) increased the power of the V6 engine to 330 hp (246 kW; 335 PS) from 296 hp (221 kW; 300 PS) and the I4 engine to 260 hp (194 kW; 264 PS) from 220 hp (164 kW; 223 PS).

Model	Years	Engine	Engine type	Displ.	Max. power	Max. torque	0–100 km/h (0–62 mph) (seconds)	Top speed (FWD)	Fuel cons. (Manual)	CO_{2} emission (g/km)
1.6T	2011–2012	Z16LET	I4, petrol	1,598 cc	180 hp (134 kW; 182 PS) at 5,500 rpm	230 N⋅m (170 lbf⋅ft) at 2,200 rpm	9.5	220 km/h (137 mph)	7.8 L/100 km (36 mpg_{‑imp})	179
2.0T	2010–2012	A20NHT	I4, petrol	1,998 cc	220 hp (164 kW; 223 PS) at 5,300 rpm	350 N⋅m (258 lbf⋅ft) at 2,500 rpm	7.9	240 km/h (149 mph)	8.2 L/100 km (34 mpg_{‑imp})	189
2.8T	2010–2012	A28NER	V6, petrol	2,792 cc	296 hp (221 kW; 300 PS) at 5,500 rpm	400 N⋅m (295 lbf⋅ft) at 2,000 rpm	6.9	250 km/h (155 mph)	8.8 L/100 km (32 mpg_{‑imp})	244
2.0T BioPower	2011–2012	A20NFT	I4, E85 or petrol	1,998 cc	220 hp (164 kW; 223 PS) at 5,300 rpm	350 N⋅m (258 lbf⋅ft) at 2,500 rpm	7.9	240 km/h (149 mph)	11.1 L/100 km (25 mpg_{‑imp})	189
2.0TiD	2010–2012	GM Family B (A20DTH)	I4, diesel	1,956 cc	158 hp (118 kW; 160 PS) at 4,000 rpm	350 N⋅m (258 lbf⋅ft) at 1,750 rpm	10.1	215 km/h (134 mph)	5.3 L/100 km (53 mpg_{‑imp})	139
2.0TTiD	2011–2012	GM Family B (A20DTR)	I4, diesel	1,956 cc	187 hp (139 kW; 190 PS) at 4,000 rpm	400 N⋅m (295 lbf⋅ft) at 1,750 rpm	8.8	230 km/h (143 mph)	6.0 L/100 km (47 mpg_{‑imp})	159

=== Transmissions and layout ===
Petrol engine				Layout	
Model	Years	Standard	Optional	front-wheel drive	four-wheel drive
1.6T	2011–2012	6-speed manual	-	✓	✗
2.0T	2010–2012	6-speed manual	6-speed automatic	✓	✓
2.8T	2010–2012	6-speed automatic	-	✗	✓
BioPower engine				Layout	
Model	Years	Standard	Optional	front-wheel drive	four-wheel drive
2.0T	2010–2012	6-speed manual	6-speed automatic	✓	✓
Diesel engine				Layout	
Model	Years	Standard	Optional	front-wheel drive	four-wheel drive
2.0TiD	2010–2012	6-speed manual	6-speed automatic	✓	✗
2.0TTiD	2010–2012	6-speed manual	-	✓	✓

=== Safety ===
Euro NCAP test results* Saab 9-5 (2009)
Test	Points	%
Overall:	5 /5 stars	
Adult occupant:	34	94%
Child occupant:	39	80%
Pedestrian:	16	44%
Safety assist:	6	86%

=== Reviews ===
- Auto Express
  For: spacious cabin, distinctive styling, well equipped.
  Against: poor residuals, driving dynamics, cheap cabin materials.
- Auto Trader
  Pros: low CO_{2} and high mpg, distinctive design, plenty of room.
  Cons: interior quality disappointing, outclassed by rivals, holds value poorly.
- Parker's
  Pros: Much kit as standard, high-tech features, driver comfort, practicality.
  Cons: Not particularly sporty, still lacks the brand appeal of its German rivals.
- The AA
  Likes: styling typically Saab but updated for the modern era; comfortable seats are a Saab trademark; cabin space is first rate - especially rear legroom; sensible pricing for the mainstream variants.
  Gripes: simple styling could be viewed as bland by uncharitable critics; can't match Jaguar's XF for sporting character; clutter-free cabin is welcome but quality of materials chosen could have been better; auto gearbox option could be more responsive.

=== Gallery ===
Second generation Saab 9-5 Sedan

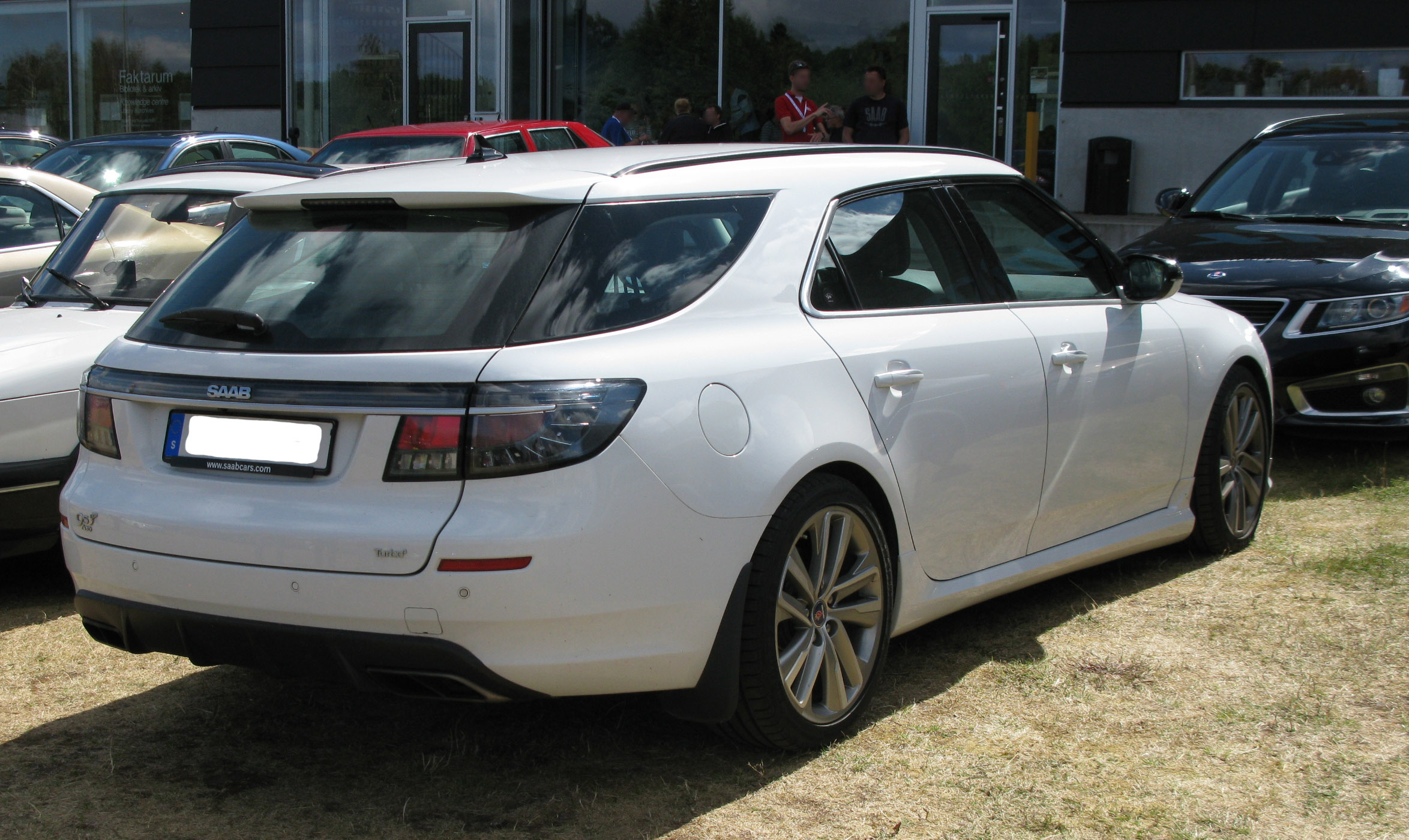
Second generation Saab 9-5 SportCombi

== Bibliography ==
- Tunberg, Anders (1997). Saab 9-5: A Personal Story. St. Gallen, Switzerland: Norden Publishing House. ISBN 978-17-852-1289-5.
- Saab 9-5 - Haynes Service and Repair Manual (1997 to Sep 2005). Sparkford, England: Haynes Publishing. 2009. ISBN 978-1-78521-289-5.
- Saab 9-5 - Haynes Service and Repair Manual (Sep 2005 to June 2010). Sparkford, England: Haynes Publishing. 2016. ISBN 978-1-78521-304-5.
