= Saab Aero =

Performance marque of Saab

- Company type: Division
- Industry: Automotive industry
- Founded: 1983
- Products: Performance engines and cars; Automotive sports accessories
- Services: Research and development
- Owner: NEVS
- Parent: Saab

Saab Aero was the high-performance division of car manufacturer Saab Automobile. The Aero name refers to Saab's history as an aircraft manufacturer. The first Aero model was the 1984 Saab 900 Aero, and every subsequent model released by Saab was then offered with the optional Aero trim level. The final Aero model was the 2014 Saab 9-3, which was manufactured by the holding company NEVS. This was also the last time a Saab-branded vehicle has been manufactured by the holding company.

== History ==
The Saab 900 Aero was introduced for the 1984 model year, or as it was known in the U.S. "Special Performance Group" (SPG). The Aero/SPG incorporated (depending on the market and model year) a body skirt; a sport-suspension (1987+) that included shorter, stiffer springs, stiffer shocks, and sway bars; leather seats; premium stereo; and air conditioning. Each of these features could, of course, be ordered independently from Saab's Accessories Catalog for fitment to standard models. Power output varied by model year and market, but 900S and 900 Turbo models produced after 1985 were fitted with a 16-valve engine, while the basic 900 kept the earlier 8-valve engine.

Some modern Aero-model Saab cars featured only a slight increase in performance, such as the Saab 9-3, while other models featured a dramatic increase in performance, such as the Saab 9-7X. The base 4.2i 9-7X produced 285 horsepower, while the Aero model produced 390 horsepower.

== Gallery ==
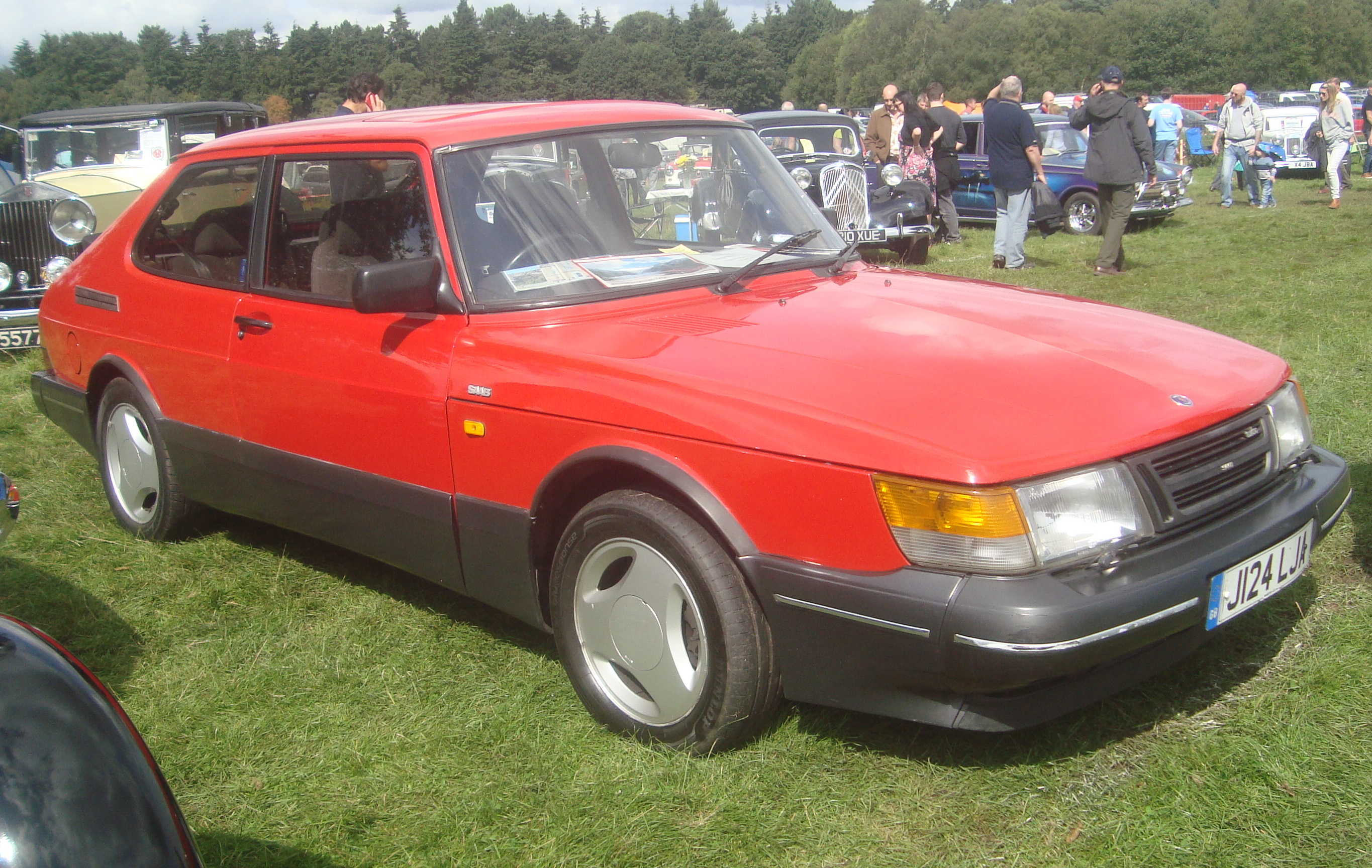
Saab 900 Aero

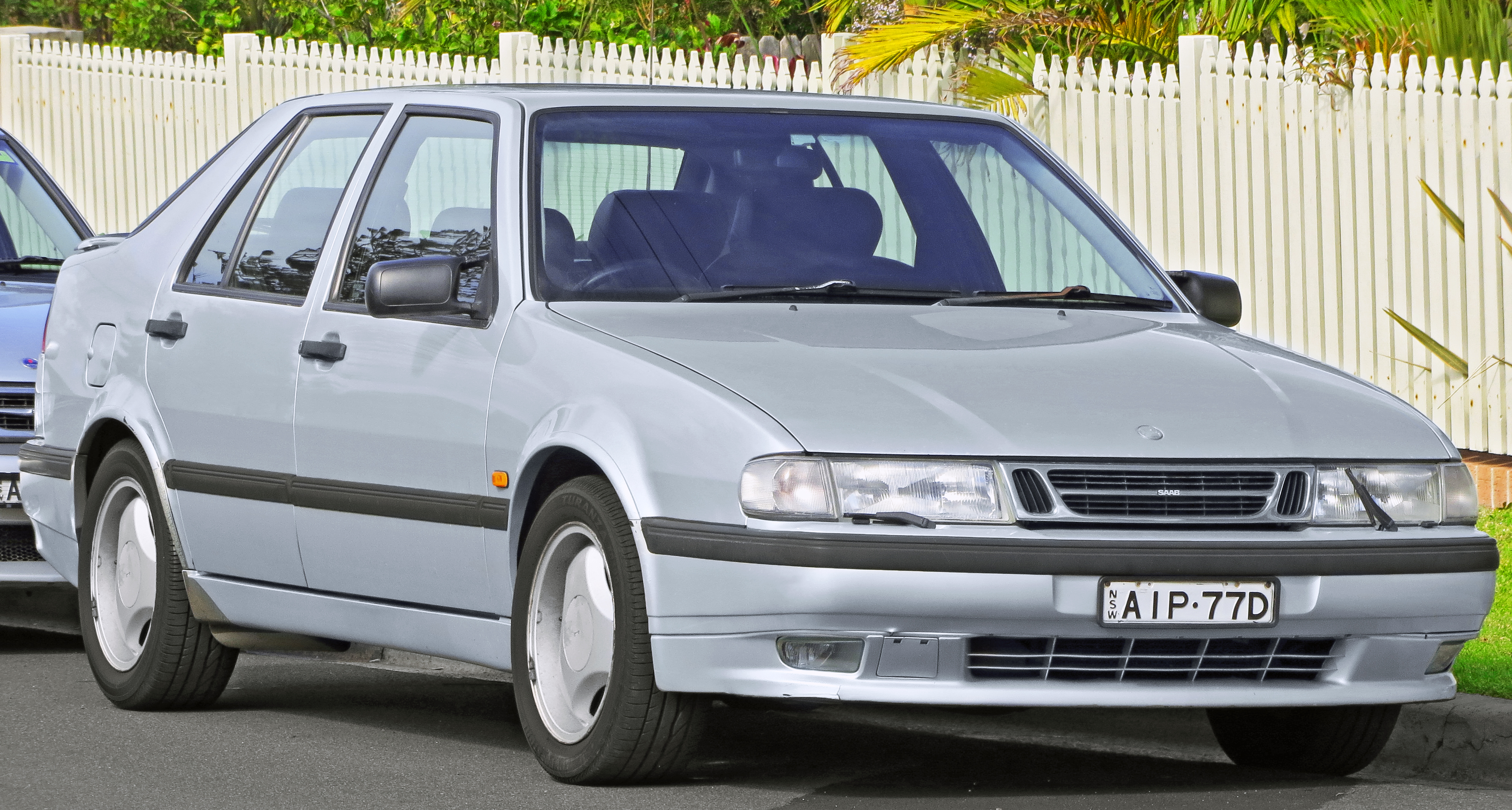
Saab 9000 Aero

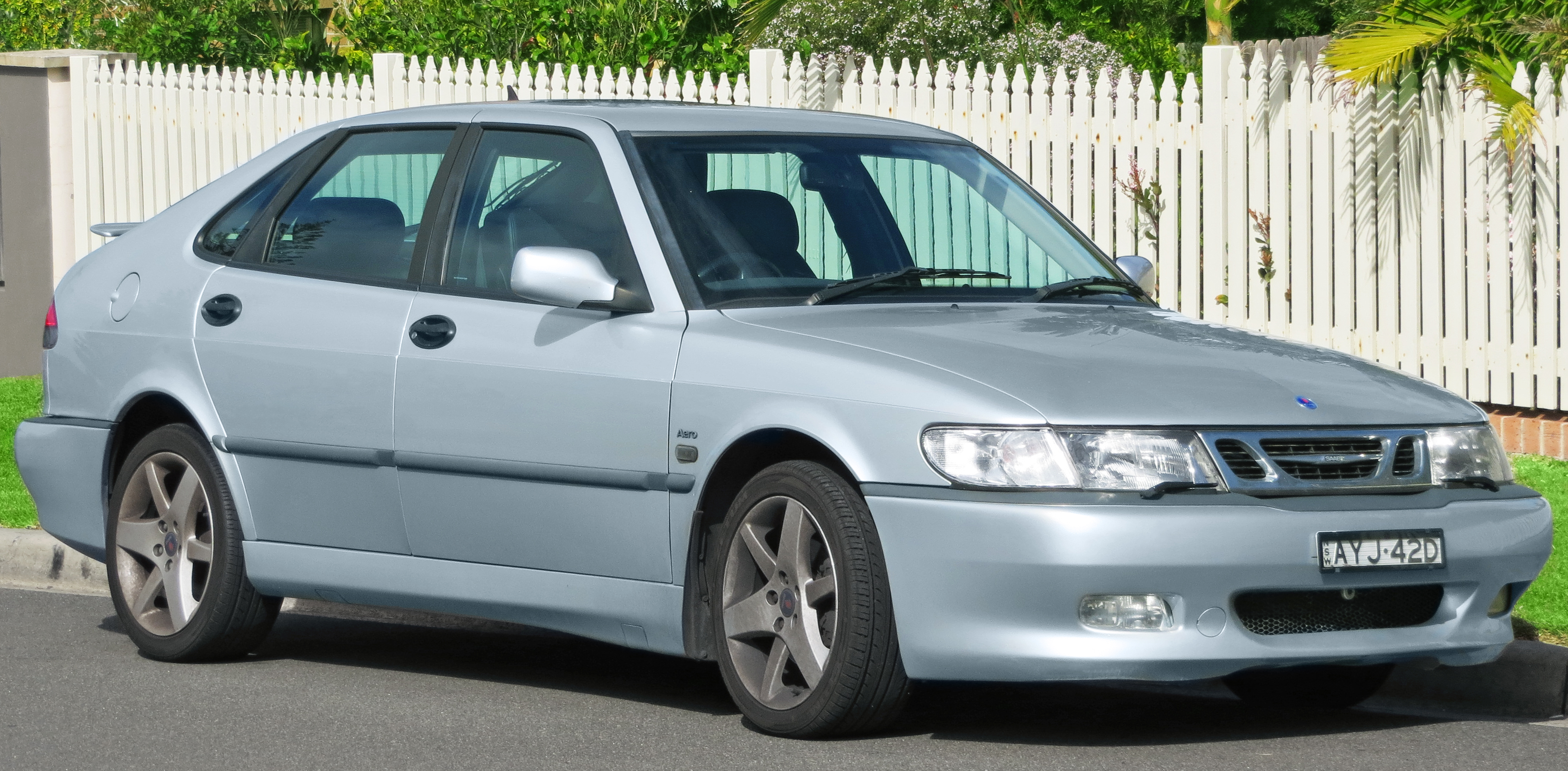
Saab 9-3 Aero

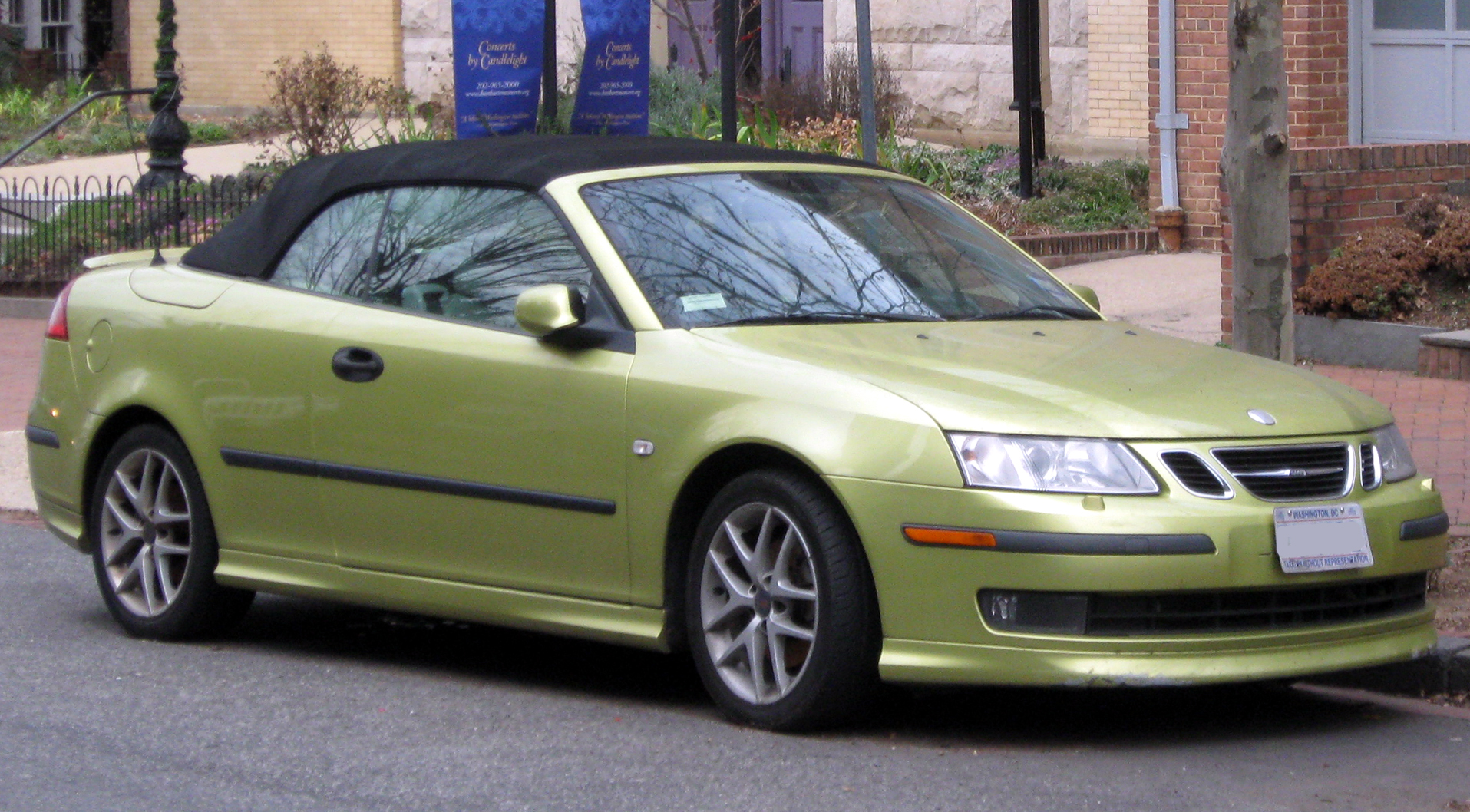
Saab 9-3 Aero

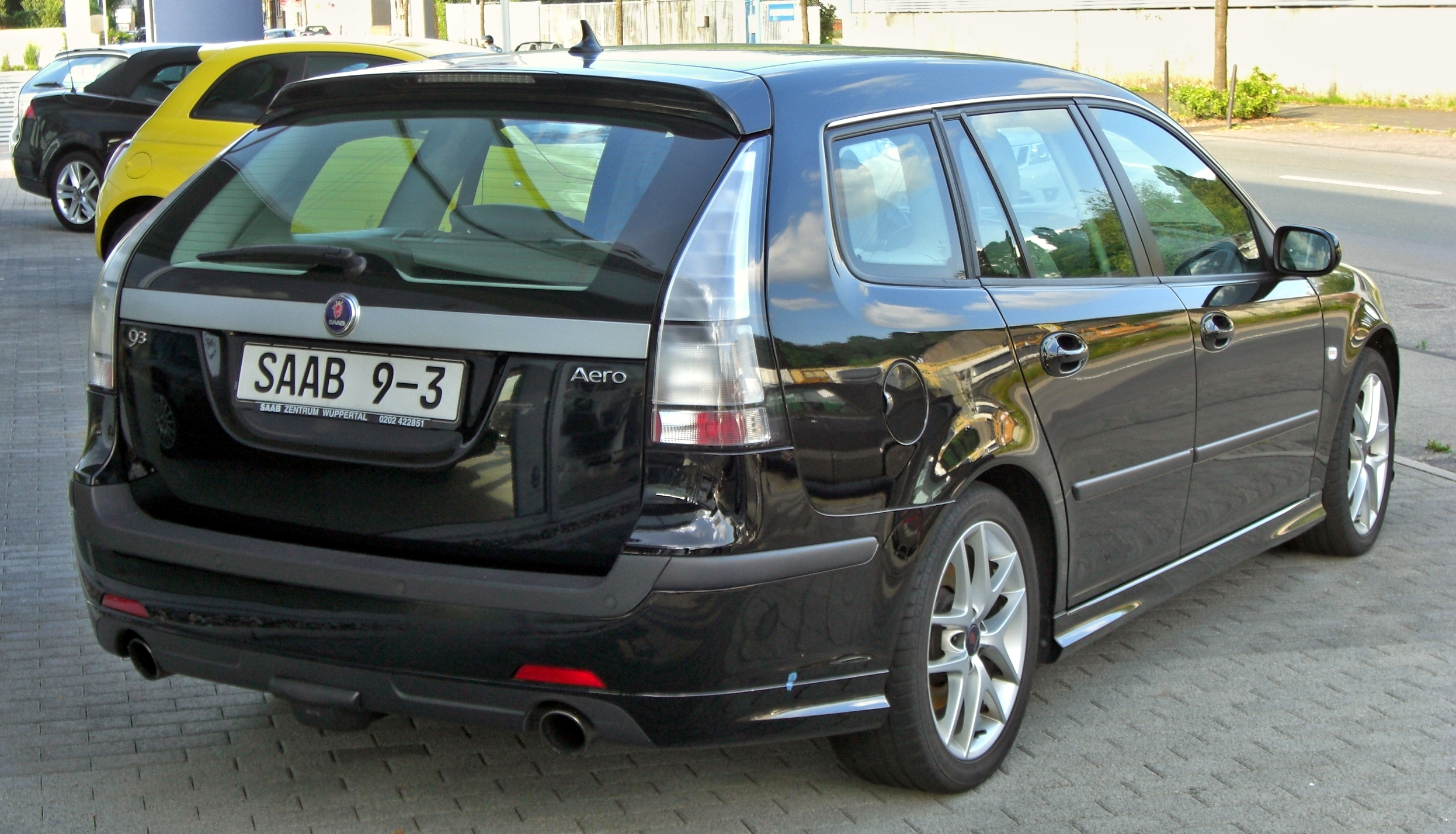
Saab 9-3 SportCombi Aero

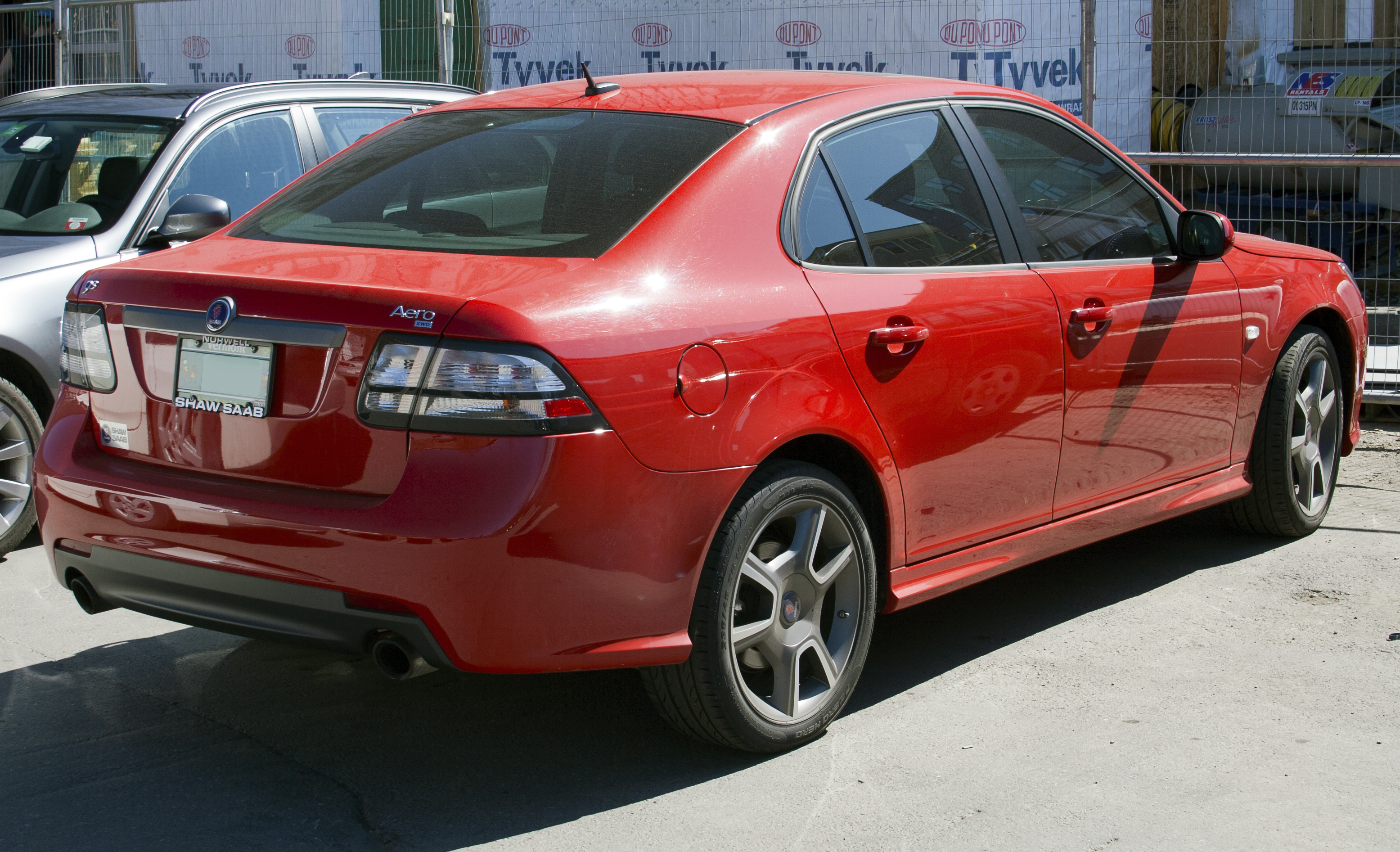
Saab 9-3 Aero XWD

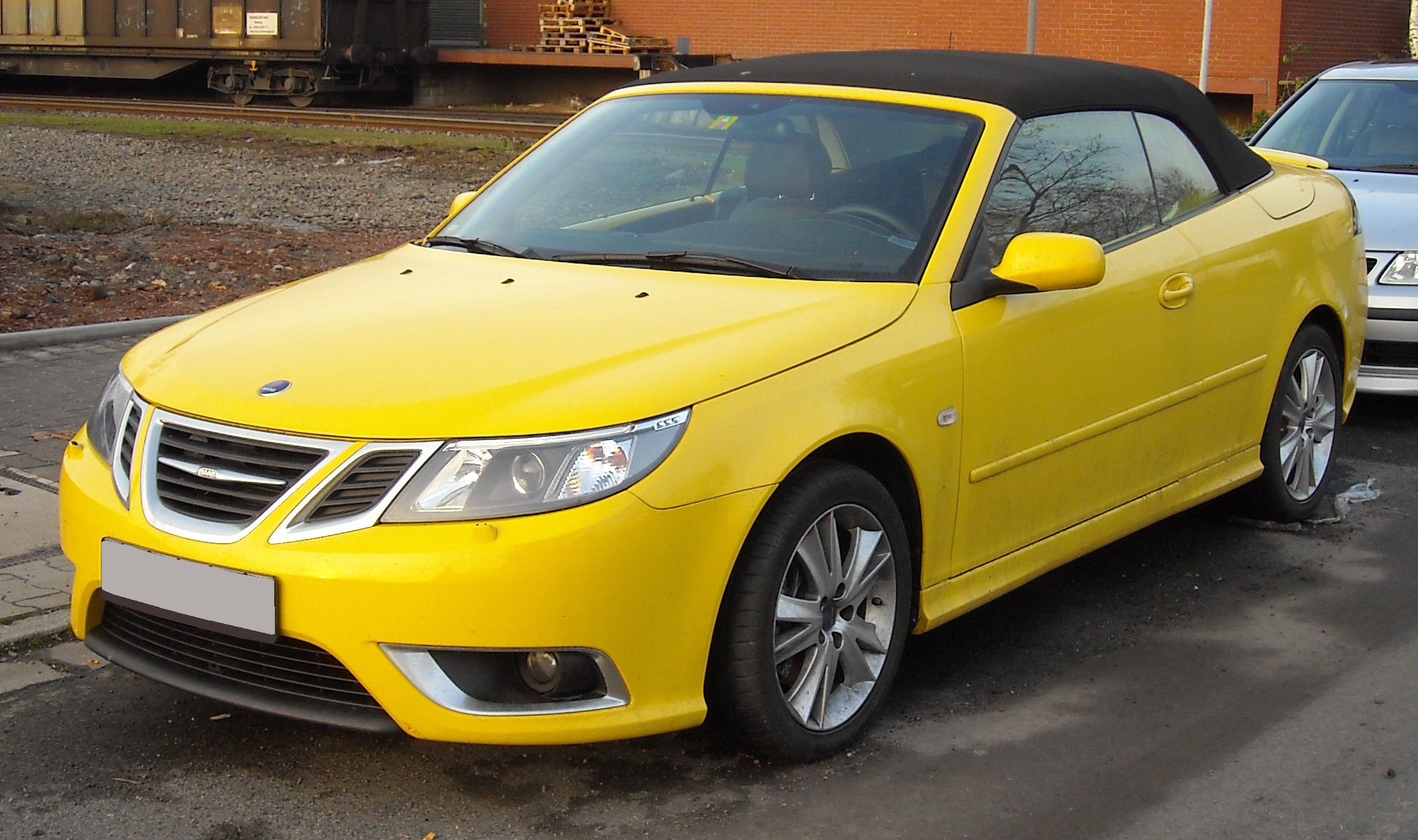
Saab 9-3 Convertible Aero

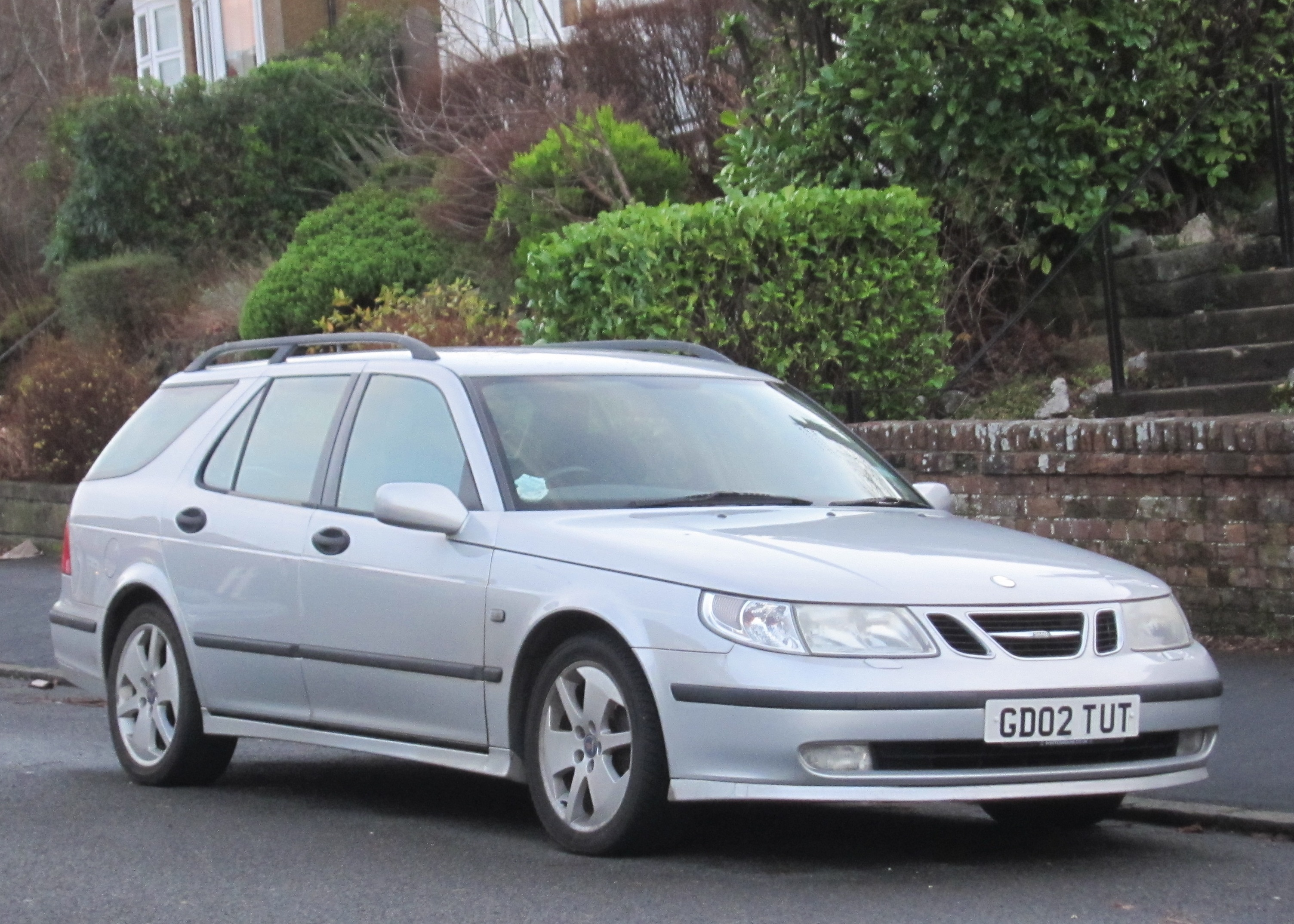
Saab 9-5 Aero Estate

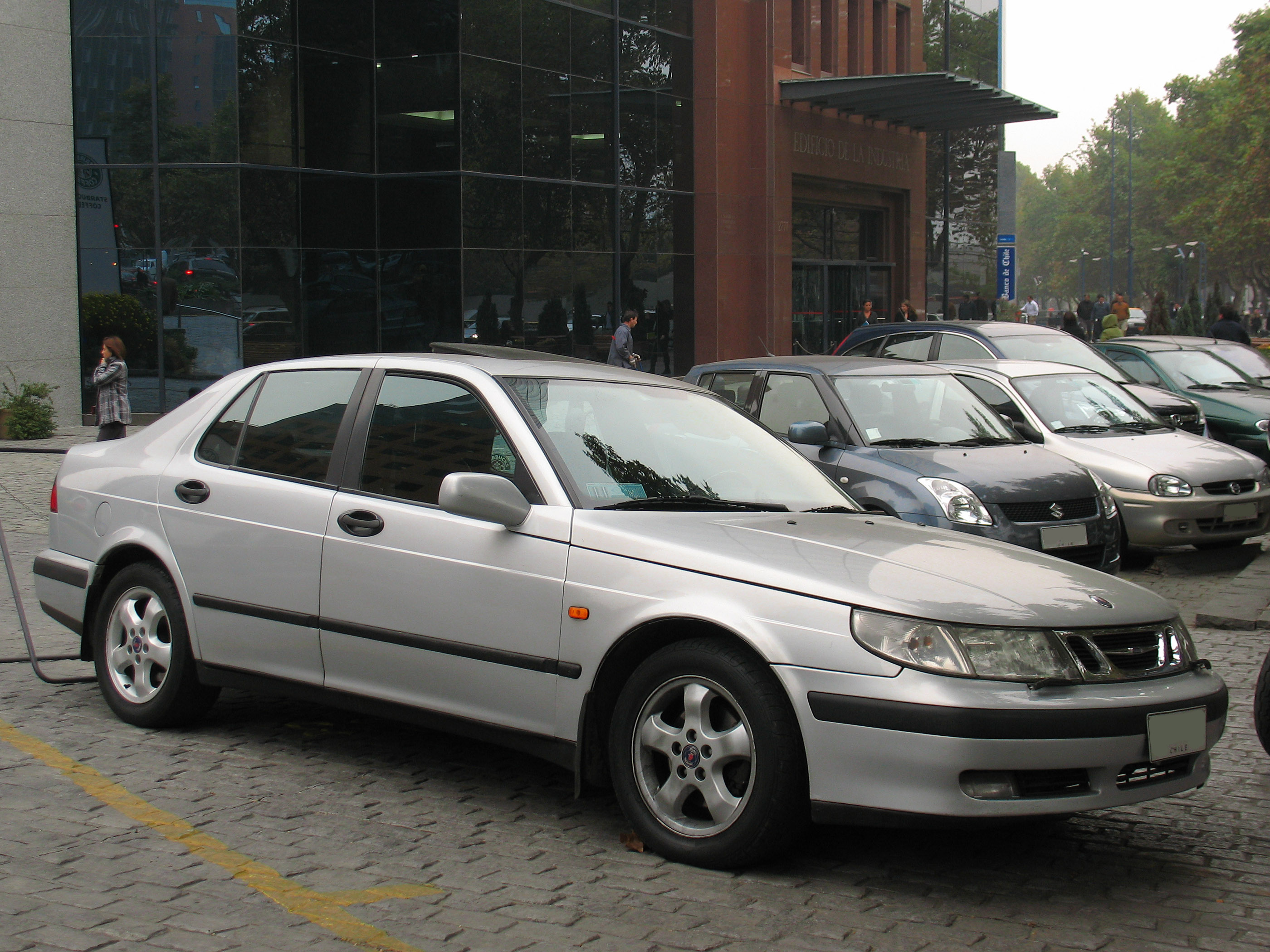
Saab 9-5 Aero sedan / saloon

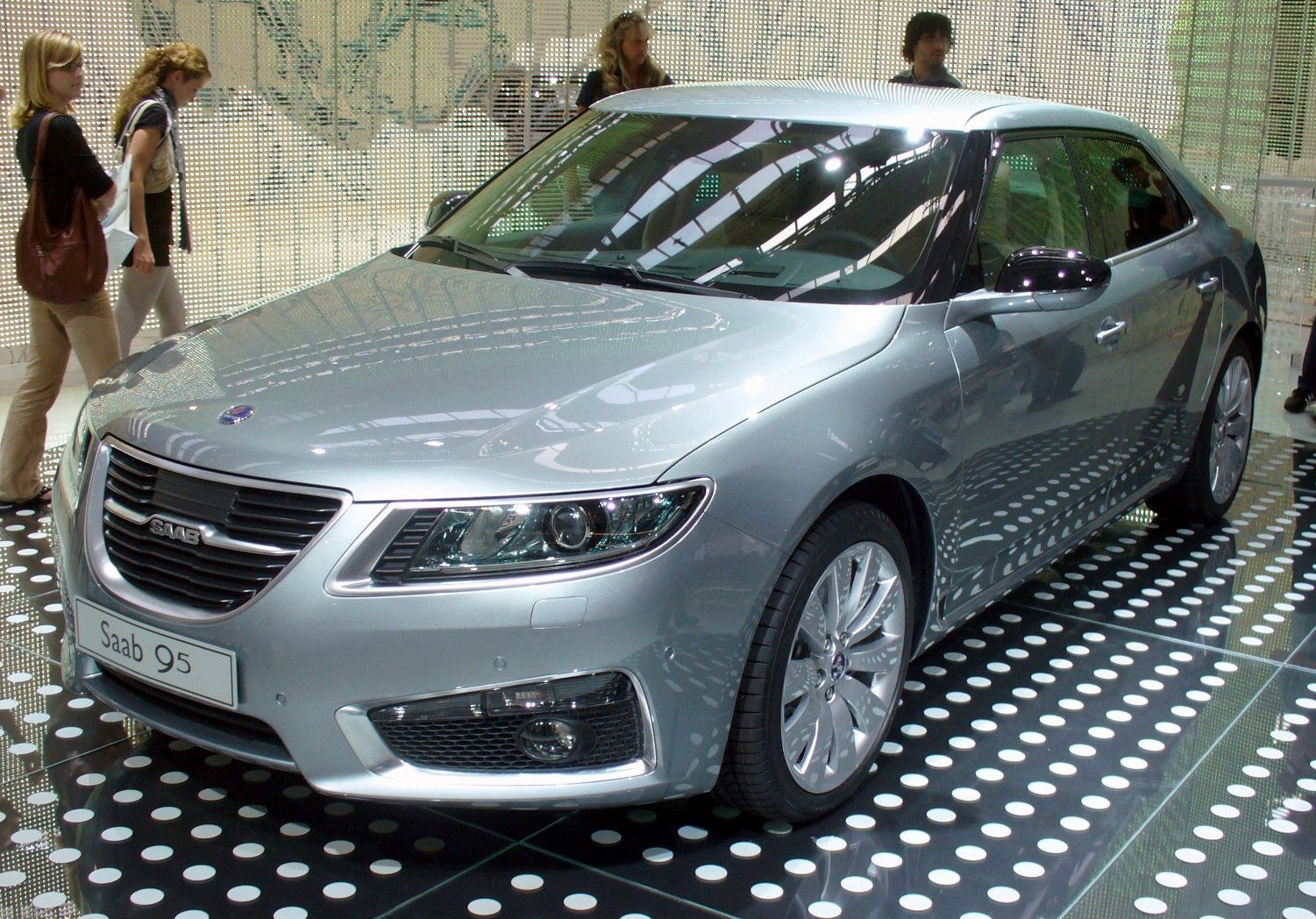
Saab 9-5 Aero XWD 2nd Generation

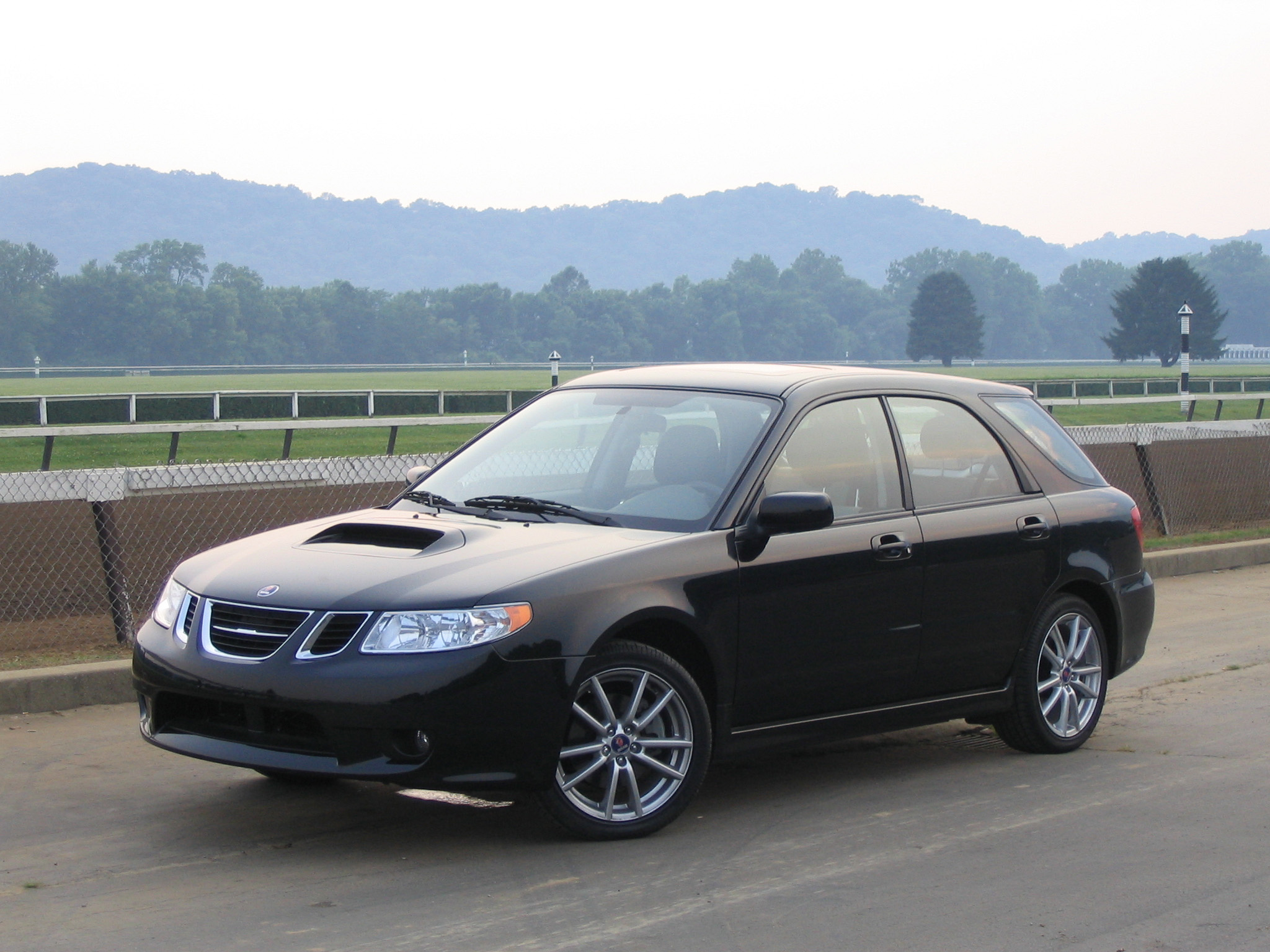
Saab 9-2X Aero

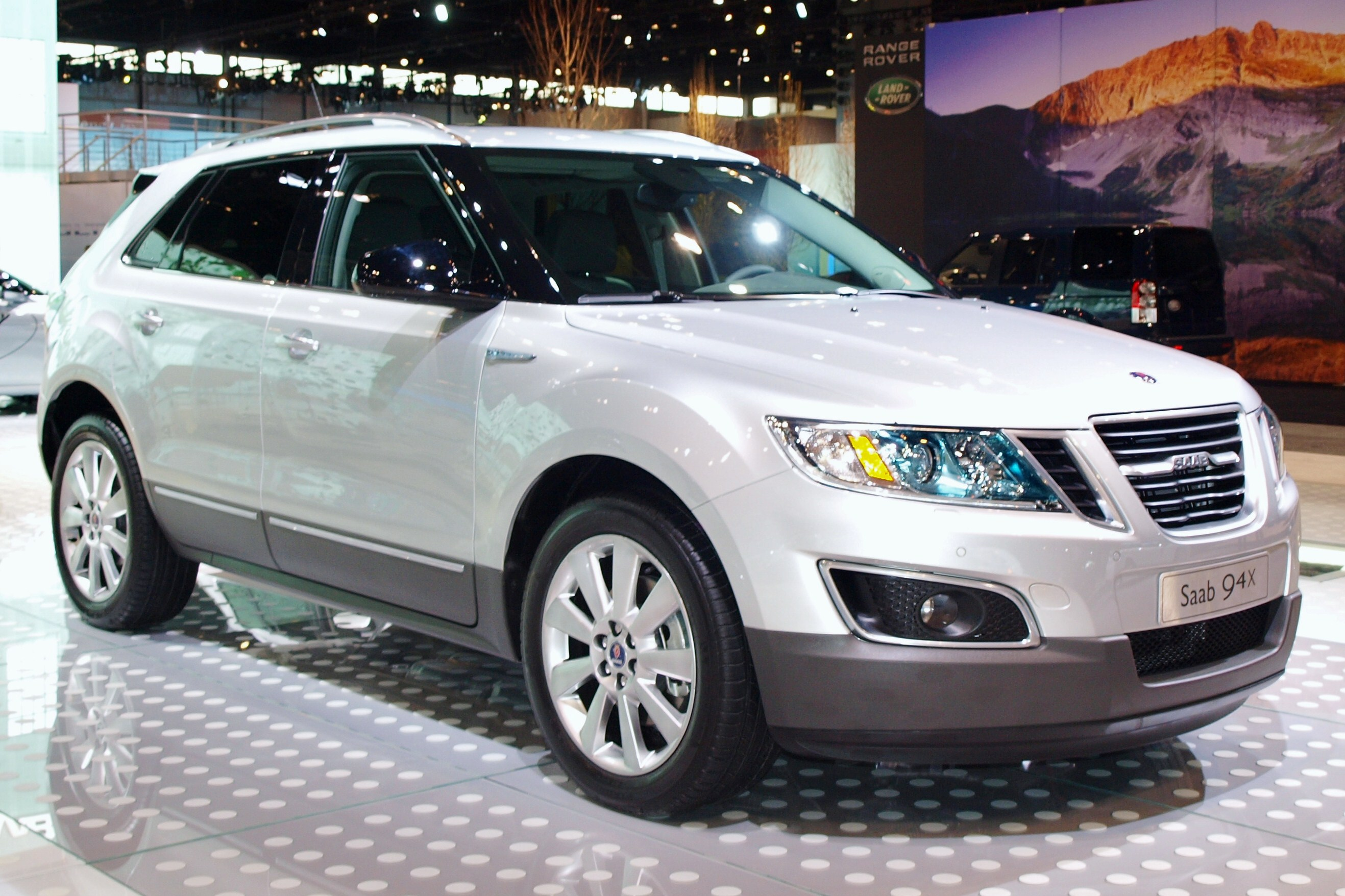
Saab 9-4X Aero

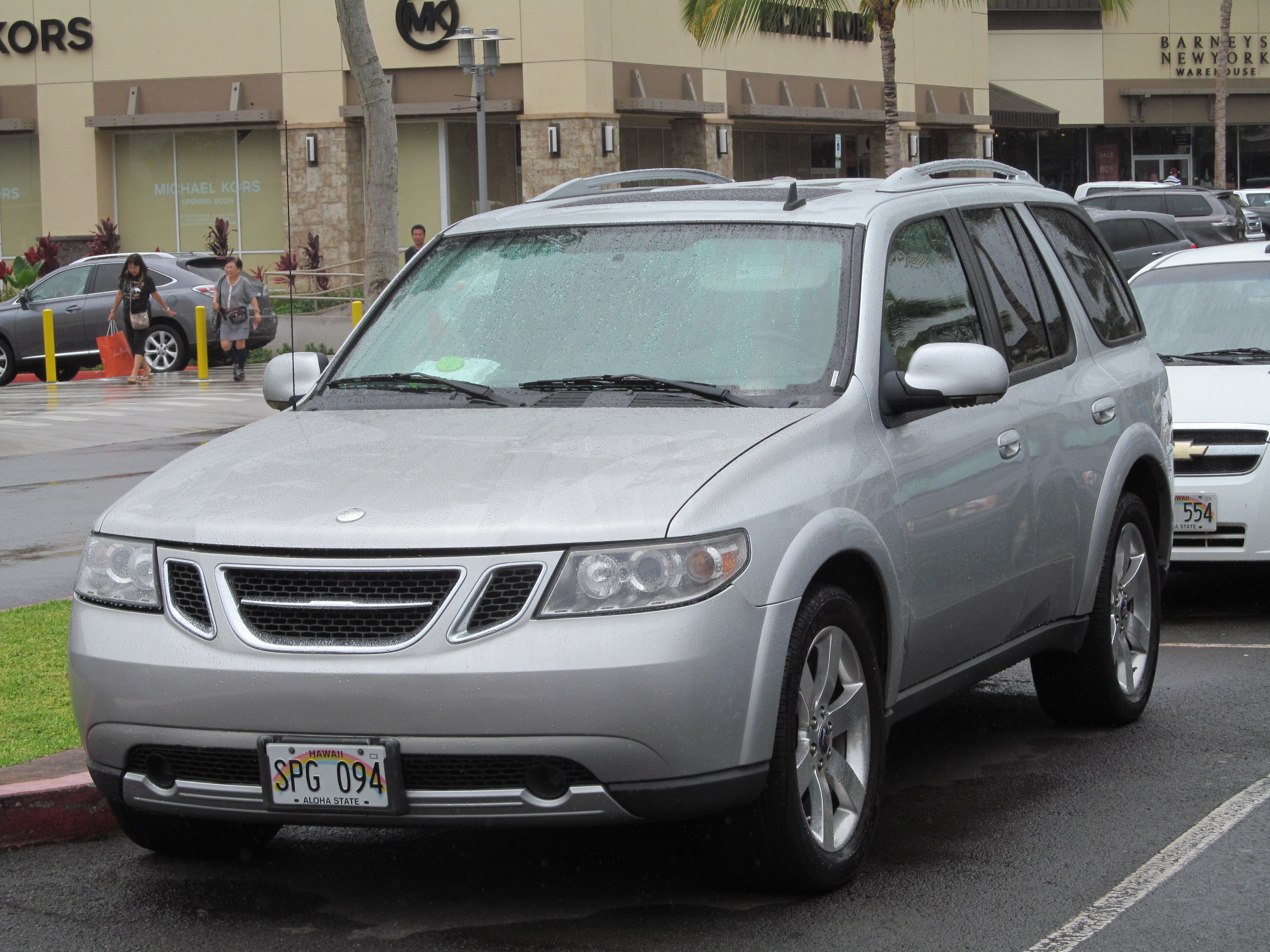
Saab 9-7X Aero

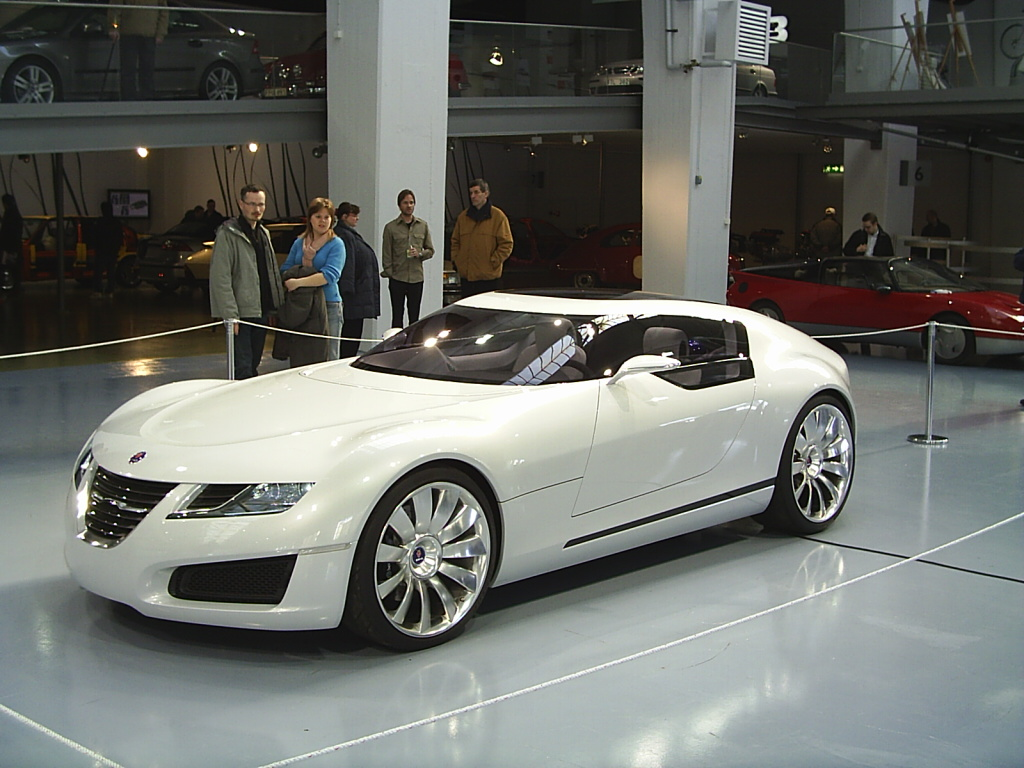
Saab Aero-X Concept

== See also ==
- Saab Aero-X
