= List of Porsche engines =

The following is lists of piston engines developed/used by German car manufacturer Porsche.

== Automotive engines ==
=== Porsche 64 ===
- 1939 1.1 L (1,100 cc) 40 PS (29 kW; 39 bhp) or 50 PS (37 kW; 49 bhp) air-cooled boxer flat-four

=== Porsche 356 ===
356

- 1948–1953 1.1 L (1,086 cc) 29 kW (39 PS; 39 bhp) 70 N⋅m (52 lb⋅ft) Type 369 air-cooled, four-stroke, OHV boxer flat-four (1100)
- 1950–1954 1.3 L (1,286 cc) 32 kW (44 PS; 43 bhp) 81 N⋅m (60 lb⋅ft) Type 506 air-cooled, four-stroke, OHV boxer flat-four (1300)
- 1954 1.3 L (1,286 cc) Type 506/1 air-cooled, four-stroke, OHV boxer flat-four (1300 A)
- 1953–1954/1954–1957 1.3 L (1,286 cc) 44 kW (60 PS; 59 bhp) Type 589 air-cooled, four-stroke, OHV boxer flat-four (1300 S)
- 1.5 L (1,488 cc) 40 kW (54 PS; 54 bhp) 106 N⋅m (78 lb⋅ft) air-cooled, four-stroke, OHV boxer flat-four (1500)
- 1951–1952 Type 527 air-cooled, four-stroke, OHV boxer flat-four (1500)
- 1952–1953 Type 546 air-cooled, four-stroke, OHV boxer flat-four (1500)
- 1954–1955 Type 546/2 air-cooled, four-stroke, OHV boxer flat-four (1500)
- 1.5 L (1,488 cc) 51 kW (69 PS; 68 bhp) 108 N⋅m (80 lb⋅ft) air-cooled, four-stroke, OHV boxer flat-four (1500 S)
- 1952–1953 1.5 L (1,488 cc) Type 528 air-cooled, four-stroke, OHV boxer flat-four (1500 S)
- 1954–1955 1.5 L (1,488 cc) Type 528/2 air-cooled, four-stroke, OHV boxer flat-four (1500 S)

Porsche 356 engines
Type	Model	Engine	MY	Engine numbers	Technical data
356	Coupe/Cabrio	369	50	00101>00411	4 Cyl / 1.1L / 29 kW (39 hp)
—
356	Coupe/Cabrio	369	51	00412>00999; 10001>10137	4 Cyl / 1.1L / 29 kW (39 hp)
356	Coupe/Cabrio	506	51	01001>01099; 20001>20821	4 Cyl / 1.3L / 32 kW (43 hp)
—
356	Coupe/Cabrio	527	52	30001>30737	4 Cyl / 1.5L / 44 kW (59 hp)
356	Cabrio	369	52	10138>10151	4 Cyl / 1.1L / 29 kW (39 hp)
356	Coupe	508	52	20822>21297	4 Cyl / 1.3L / 32 kW (43 hp)
356	Cabrio	527	52	30738>30750	4 Cyl / 1.5L / 44 kW (59 hp)
—
356	Coupe	546	53	30751>31025	4 Cyl / 1.5L / 40 kW (54 hp)
356	Cabrio	528	53	40001>40117	4 Cyl / 1.5L / 51 kW (68 hp)
356	Coupe/Cabrio	369	53	10152>10161	4 Cyl / 1.1L / 29 kW (39 hp)
356	Coupe/Cabrio	506	53	21298>21636	4 Cyl / 1.3L / 32 kW (43 hp)
356	Coupe/Cabrio	546	53	31026>32569	4 Cyl / 1.5L / 40 kW (54 hp)
356	Coupe/Cabrio	528	53	40118>40685	4 Cyl / 1.5L / 40 kW (54 hp)
—
356	Coupe/Cabrio	589	54	50001>50017	4 Cyl / 1.3L / 44 kW (59 hp)
356	Coupe/Cabrio/Speedster	369	54	10162>10199	4 Cyl /1.1L / 29 kW (39 hp)
356	Coupe/Cabrio/Speedster	506	54	21637>21780	4 Cyl / 1.3L / 32 kW (43 hp)
356	Coupe/Cabrio/Speedster	589	54	50018>50019	4 Cyl / 1.3L / 44 kW (59 hp)
356	Coupe/Cabrio/Speedster	506/1	54	21781>21999	4 Cyl /1.3L / 32 kW (43 hp)
356	Coupe/Cabrio/Speedster	546	54	32570>33899	4 Cyl / 1.5L / 40 kW (54 hp)
356	Coupe/Cabrio/Speedster	528	54	40686>40999	4 Cyl / 1.5L / 51 kW (68 hp)
—
356	Coupe/Cabrio/Speedster	506/2	55	22001>22021	4 Cyl / 1.3L / 32 kW (43 hp)
356	Coupe/Cabrio/Speedster	589/2	55	50101>50127	4 Cyl / 1.3L 44 kW (59 hp)
356	Coupe/Cabrio/Speedster	546/2	55	33901>34119	4 Cyl / 1.5L / 40 kW (54 hp)
356	Coupe/Cabrio/Speedster	528/2	55	41001>41048	4 Cyl / 1.5L / 51 kW (68 hp)
356	Coupe/Cabrio/Speedster	506/2	55	22022>22245	4 Cyl / 1.3L / 32 kW (43 hp)
356	Coupe/Cabrio/Speedster	589/2	55	50101>50127	4 Cyl / 1.3L / 44 kW (59 hp)
356	Coupe/Cabrio/Speedster	546/2	55	34120>35790	4 Cyl / 1.5L / 40 kW (54 hp)
356	Coupe/Cabrio/Speedster	528/2	55	41049>41999	4 Cyl / 1.5L / 51 kW (68 hp)

356 A

- 1.3 L (1,286 cc) 32 kW (44 PS; 43 bhp) 81 N⋅m (60 lb⋅ft) Type 506 air-cooled, four-stroke, OHV boxer flat-four (1300)
- 1.3 L (1,286 cc) Type 506/2 air-cooled, four-stroke, OHV boxer flat-four (1300 A)
- 1953–1954/1954–1957 1.3 L (1,286 cc) 44 kW (60 PS; 59 bhp) Type 589 air-cooled, four-stroke, OHV boxer flat-four (1300 S)
- 1955–1957 1.5 L (1,498 cc) Type 547/1 air-cooled, four-stroke, DOHC boxer flat-four (Carrera 1500 GS/GT)
- 1958 1.5 L (1,498 cc) Type 692/0 air-cooled, four-stroke, DOHC boxer flat-four (Carrera 1500 GT)
- 1958 1.5 L (1,498 cc) Type 692/1 air-cooled, four-stroke, DOHC boxer flat-four (Carrera 1500 GT)
- 1.6 L (1,582 cc) Type 616/1 air-cooled, four-stroke, OHV boxer flat-four (1600)
- 1.6 L (1,582 cc) Type 616/2 air-cooled, four-stroke, OHV boxer flat-four (1600 S)
- 1.6 L (1,587 cc) Type 692/2 air-cooled, four-stroke, DOHC boxer flat-four (Carrera 1600 GS)

Porsche 356 A engines
Type	Model	Engine	MY	Engine numbers	Technical data
356 A	Carrera GS	547/1	56	P90501>P90959	4 Cyl / 1.6L / 73 kW (98 hp)
356 A	Carrera GT	547/1	56	P90501>P90959	4 Cyl / 1.6L / 80 kW (107 hp)
356 A	Coupe/Cabrio/Speedster	506/2	56	22246>22273	4 Cyl / 1.3L / 32 kW (43 hp)
356 A	Coupe/Cabrio/Speedster	589/2	56	50128>50135	4 Cyl / 1.3L / 44 kW (59 hp)
356 A	Coupe/Cabrio/Speedster	616/1	56	60001>60608	4 Cyl / 1.6L / 44 kW (59 hp)
356 A	Coupe/Cabrio/Speedster	616/2	56	80001>80110	4 Cyl / 1.6L / 55 kW (74 hp)
356 A	Coupe/Cabrio/Speedster	506/2	56	22274>22471	4 Cyl / 1.3L / 32 kW (43 hp)
356 A	Coupe/Cabrio/Speedster	589/2	56	50136>50155	4 Cyl / 1.3L / 44 kW (59 hp)
356 A	Coupe/Cabrio/Speedster	616/1	56	60609>63926	4 Cyl /1.6L / 44 kW (59 hp)
356 A	Coupe/Cabrio/Speedster	616/2	56	80111>80756	4 Cyl /1.6L / 55 kW (74 hp)
—
356 A	Carrera GS	547/1	57	P90501/P90959	4 Cyl / 1.6L / 73 kW (98 hp)
356 A	Carrera GT	547/1	57	P90501/P90959	4 Cyl / 1.6L / 80 kW (107 hp)
356 A	Coupe/Cabrio/Speedster	506/2	57	22472>22999	4 Cyl / 1.3L / 32 kW (43 hp)
356 A	Coupe/Cabrio/Speedster	589/2	57	50156>50999	4 Cyl / 1.3L / 44 kW (59 hp)
356 A	Coupe/Cabrio/Speedster	616/1	57	63927>66999	4 Cyl / 1.6L / 44 kW (59 hp)
356 A	Coupe/Cabrio/Speedster	616/2	57	80757>81199	4 Cyl / 1.6L / 55 kW (74 hp)
—
356 A	Carrera GS	547/1	58	P90501>P90959	4 Cyl / 1.6L / 73 kW (98 hp)
356 A	Carrera GT	547/1	58	P90501>P90959	4 Cyl / 1.6L / 80 kW (107 hp)
356 A	Coupe/Cabrio/Speedster	616/1	58	67001>68216	4 Cyl / 1.6L / 44 kW (59 hp)
356 A	Coupe/Cabrio/Speedster	616/2	58	81201>81521	4 Cyl / 1.6L / 55 kW (74 hp)
356 A	Coupe/Cabrio/Speedster	616/1	58	68217>72468	4 Cyl / 1.6L / 44 kW (59 hp)
356 A	Coupe/Cabrio/Speedster	616/2	58	81522>83145	4 Cyl / 1.6L / 55 kW (74 hp)
—
356 A	Carrera GS	547/1	59	P90501>P90959	4 Cyl / 1.6L / 73 kW (98 hp)
356 A	Carrera GT	547/1	59	P90501>P90959	4 Cyl / 1.6L / 80 kW (107 hp)
356 A	Carrera GT	692/0	59	P91001>P91037	4 Cyl / 1.6L / 80 kW (107 hp)
356 A	Carrera GT	692/1	59	P92001>P92014	4 Cyl / 1.6L / 80 kW (107 hp)
356 A	Carrera GS	692/2	59	P93001>P93062	4 Cyl / 1.6L / 77 kW (103 hp)
356 A	Coupe/Cabrio/Speedster	616/1	59	72469>79999	4 Cyl / 1.6L / 44 kW (59 hp)
356 A	Coupe/Cabrio/Speedster	616/2	59	83146>84770	4 Cyl / 1.6L / 55 kW (74 hp)

356 B

- 1.6 L (1,582 cc) Type 616/1 air-cooled, four-stroke, OHV boxer flat-four (1600)
- 1960–1962 1.6 L (1,582 cc) Type 616/2 air-cooled, four-stroke, OHV boxer flat-four (1600 S)
- 1.6 L (1,582 cc) Type 616/7 air-cooled, four-stroke, OHV boxer flat-four (1600 Super 90)
- 1962–1963 1.6 L (1,582 cc) Type 616/12 air-cooled, four-stroke, OHV boxer flat-four (1600 S)
- 1960 1.6 L (1,588 cc) Type 692/3 air-cooled, four-stroke, DOHC boxer flat-four (1600 Carrera GS GT, Carrera GTL Abarth)
- 1961 1.6 L (1,588 cc) Type 692/3A air-cooled, four-stroke, DOHC boxer flat-four (1600 Carrera GS GT)
- 1962–1963 2.0 L (1,966 cc) Type 587/1 air-cooled, four-stroke, DOHC boxer flat-four (2000 Carrera 2 GS)
- 1963 2.0 L (1,966 cc) Type 587/2 air-cooled, four-stroke, DOHC boxer flat-four (2000 Carrera 2 GS GT)

Porsche 356 B engines
Type	Model	Engine	MY	Engine numbers	Technical data
356 B	Carrera GS	692/2	59	P93001>P93062	4 Cyl / 1.6L / 77 kW (103 hp)
356 B	Carrera GS	692/2	59	P93100>P93138	4 Cyl / 1.6L / 77 kW (103 hp)
—
356 B	Coupe/Cabrio/Roadster	616/1	60	600101>604700	4 Cyl / 1.6L / 44 kW (59 hp)
356 B	Coupe/Cabrio/Roadster	616/2	60	084771>088320	4 Cyl / 1.6L / 55 kW (74 hp)
356 B	Coupe/Cabrio/Roadster	616/7	60	800101>802000	4 Cyl / 1.6L / 66 kW (89 hp)
356 B	Carrera GT	692/3	60	P95001>P95114	4 Cyl / 1.6L / 85 kW (114 hp)
—
356 B	Coupe/Cabrio/Roadster	616/1	61	604701>606799	4 Cyl / 1.6L / 44 kW (59 hp)
356 B	Coupe/Cabrio/Roadster	616/2	61	088321>089999	4 Cyl / 1.6L / 55 kW (74 hp)
356 B	Coupe -Karmann-	616/2	61	085001>085670	4 Cyl / 1.6L / 55 kW (74 hp)
356 B	Coupe/Cabrio/Roadster	616/7	61	802001>803999	4 Cyl / 1.6L / 66 kW (89 hp)
356 B	Carrera GT/Abarth GLT	692/3A	61	P96001>P96050	4 Cyl / 1.6L / 99 kW (133 hp)
—
356 B	Coupe/Cabrio/Roadster	616/1	62	606801>608900	4 Cyl / 1.6L / 44 kW (59 hp)
356 B	Coupe/Cabrio/Roadster	616/12	62	700001>702800	4 Cyl / 1.6L / 55 kW (74 hp)
356 B	Coupe/Cabrio/Roadster	616/7	62	804001>805600	4 Cyl / 1.6L / 66 kW (89 hp)
356 B	Carrera GS	587/1	62	P97001>P97446	4 Cyl / 2.0L / 96 kW (129 hp)
—
356 B	Coupe/Cabrio	616/1	63	608901>611200	4 Cyl / 1.6L / 44 kW (59 hp)
356 B	Coupe -Karmann-	616/1	63	600501>600600	4 Cyl / 1.6L / 44 kW (59 hp)
356 B	Coupe/Cabrio	616/12	63	702801>707200	4 Cyl / 1.6L / 55 kW (74 hp)
356 B	Coupe -Karmann-	616/12	63	700501>701200	4 Cyl / 1.6L / 55 kW (74 hp)
356 B	Coupe/Cabrio	616/7	63	805601>807400	4 Cyl / 1.6L / 66 kW (89 hp)
356 B	Coupe -Karmann-	616/7	63	800501>801000	4 Cyl / 1.6L / 66 kW (89 hp)
356 B	Carrera GS	587/1	63	P97001>P97446	4 Cyl / 2.0L / 96 kW (129 hp)
356 B	Carrera GS/GT	587/2	63	P98005>P98032	4 Cyl / 2.0L / 118 kW (158 hp)

356 C

- 1.6 L (1,582 cc) Type 616/15 air-cooled, four-stroke, OHV boxer flat-four (1600 C)
- 1.6 L (1,582 cc) Type 616/16 air-cooled, four-stroke, OHV boxer flat-four (1600 SC)
- 1.6 L (1,582 cc) Type 616/26 air-cooled, four-stroke, OHV boxer flat-four (1600 SC, police)
- 2.0 L (1,966 cc) Type 587/1 air-cooled, four-stroke, DOHC boxer flat-four (Carrera 2)
- 2.0 L (1,966 cc) Type 587/2 air-cooled, four-stroke, DOHC boxer flat-four (Carrera 2)

Porsche 356 C engines
Type	Model	Engine	MY	Engine numbers	Technical data
356 C	Coupe/Cabrio	616/15	64	710001>716804	4 Cyl / 1.6L / 55 kW (74 hp)
356 C	Coupe -Karmann-	616/15	64	730001>733027	4 Cyl / 1.6L / 55 kW (74 hp)
356 C	Coupe/Cabrio	616/16	64	810001>813562	4 Cyl / 1.6L / 70 kW (94 hp)
356 C	Coupe -Karmann-	616/16	64	820001>821701	4 Cyl / 1.6L / 70 kW (94 hp)
—
356 C	Coupe/Cabrio	616/15	65	716805>	4 Cyl / 1.6L / 55 kW (74 hp)
356 C	Coupe/Cabrio	616/15	65	733028>	4 Cyl / 1.6L / 55 kW (74 hp)
356 C	Coupe/Cabrio	616/16	65	813563>	4 Cyl / 1.6L / 70 kW (94 hp)
356 C	Coupe/Cabrio	616/16	65	821702>	4 Cyl / 1.6L / 70 kW (94 hp)

=== Porsche Type 360 Cisitalia Grand Prix ===
- 1946–1949 1.5 L (1,500 cc) 224–287 kW (305–390 PS; 300–385 bhp) 251–262 N⋅m (185–193 lb⋅ft) air-cooled, four-stroke, DOHC, four-valve flat-12

=== Porsche 550 ===
- 1953–1957 1.5 L (1,498 cc) 81 kW (110 PS; 109 bhp) 117 N⋅m (86 lb⋅ft) Type 547 air-cooled, four-stroke, DOHC, eight-valve boxer flat-four (550/1500 RS)
- 1956–1957 1.5 L (1,498 cc) 99 kW (135 PS; 133 bhp) 145 N⋅m (107 lb⋅ft) Type 547 air-cooled, four-stroke, DOHC, eight-valve boxer flat-four (550 A/1500 RS)

=== Porsche 718 / Porsche 787 ===
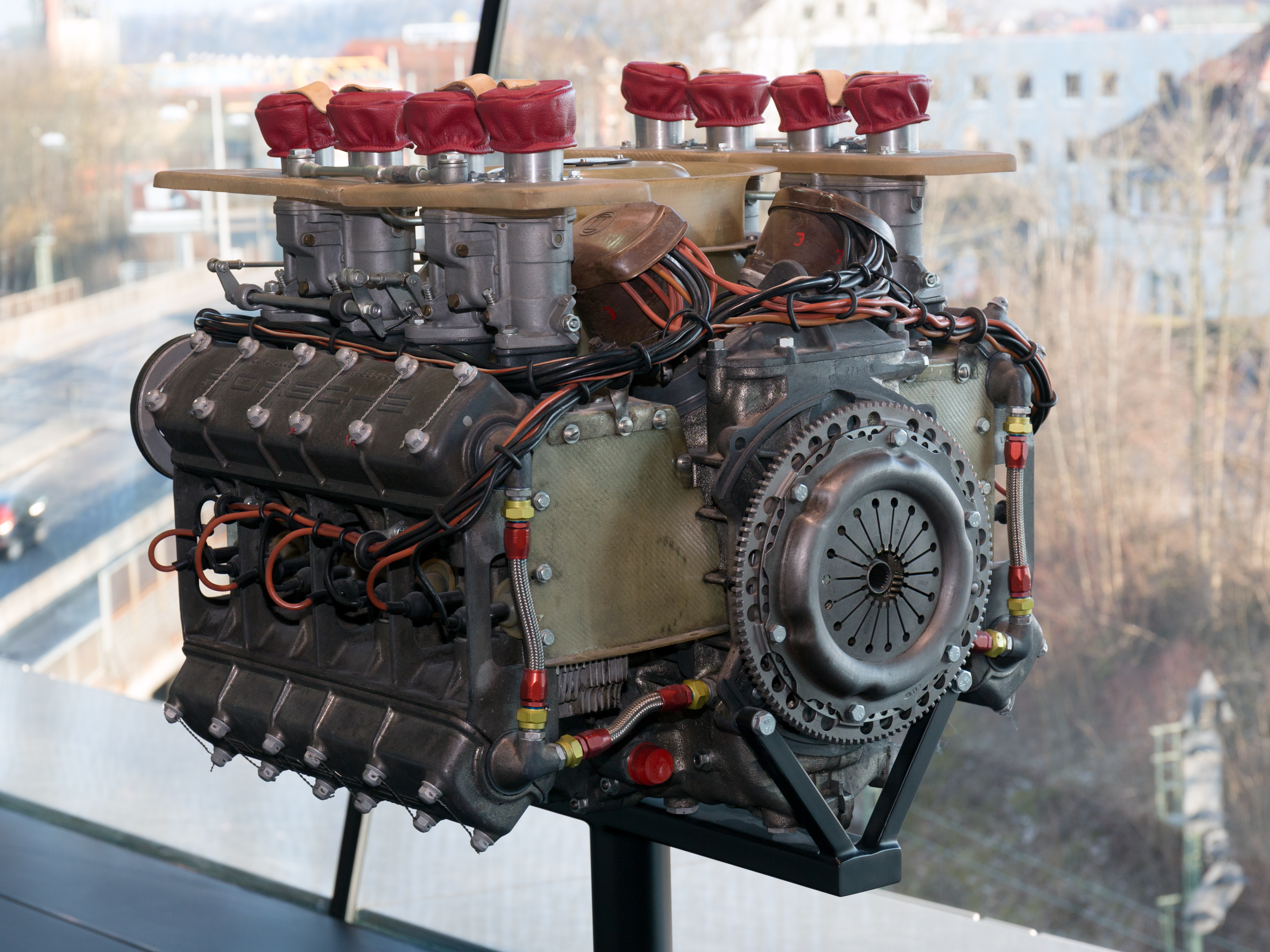
Type 771 flat-eight

- 1957 1.5 L (1,498 cc) 105 kW (143 PS; 141 bhp) 146 N⋅m (108 lbf⋅ft) Type 547 air-cooled, four-stroke, DOHC, eight-valve boxer flat-four (718/1500 RSK Spyder)
- 1959 1.5 L (1,498 cc) 110 kW (150 PS; 148 bhp) 147 N⋅m (108 lbf⋅ft) Type 547 air-cooled, four-stroke, DOHC, eight-valve boxer flat-four (718/2 Monoposto)
- 1958–1961 1.6 L (1,587 cc) 118 kW (160 PS; 158 bhp) 147 N⋅m (108 lbf⋅ft) Type 547 air-cooled, four-stroke, DOHC, eight-valve boxer flat-four (718/1600 RSK Spyder, 718 RS 60, 718 RS 61)
- 1961 2.0 L (1,981 cc) 176 kW (239 PS; 236 bhp) 205 N⋅m (151 lbf⋅ft) Type 771 air-cooled, four-stroke, DOHC boxer flat-eight (718 W-RS)
- 1962 2.0 L (1,981 cc) 154 kW (209 PS; 207 bhp) 192 N⋅m (142 lbf⋅ft) Type 771 air-cooled, four-stroke, DOHC boxer flat-eight (718 RS 61, 718 GTR)

=== Porsche 804 ===
- 1962 1.5 L (1,492 cc) 135 kW (184 PS; 181 bhp) 153 N⋅m (113 lbf⋅ft) air-cooled, four-stroke, boxer flat-eight

=== Porsche 904 Carrera GTS ===
- 1963–1965 2.0 L (1,966 cc) 114 kW (155 PS; 153 bhp) 169 N⋅m (125 lbf⋅ft) air-cooled, four-stroke, boxer flat-four (904 Coupé)
- 1963–1965 2.0 L (1,966 cc) 132 kW (179 PS; 177 bhp) 196 N⋅m (145 lbf⋅ft) air-cooled, four-stroke, boxer flat-four (904 Coupé)
- 1965 2.0 L (1,991 cc) 155 kW (211 PS; 208 bhp) 196 N⋅m (145 lbf⋅ft) air-cooled, four-stroke, boxer flat-six (904/6 Coupé)
- 1964 2.2 L (2,195 cc) 198 kW (269 PS; 266 bhp) 230 N⋅m (170 lbf⋅ft) Type 771 air-cooled, four-stroke, boxer flat-eight (904/8 Coupé)
- 1965 2.0 L (1,982 cc) 191 kW (260 PS; 256 bhp) 210 N⋅m (155 lbf⋅ft) Type 771 air-cooled, four-stroke, boxer flat-eight (904/8 Bergspyder)

=== Porsche 906 Carrera 6 ===
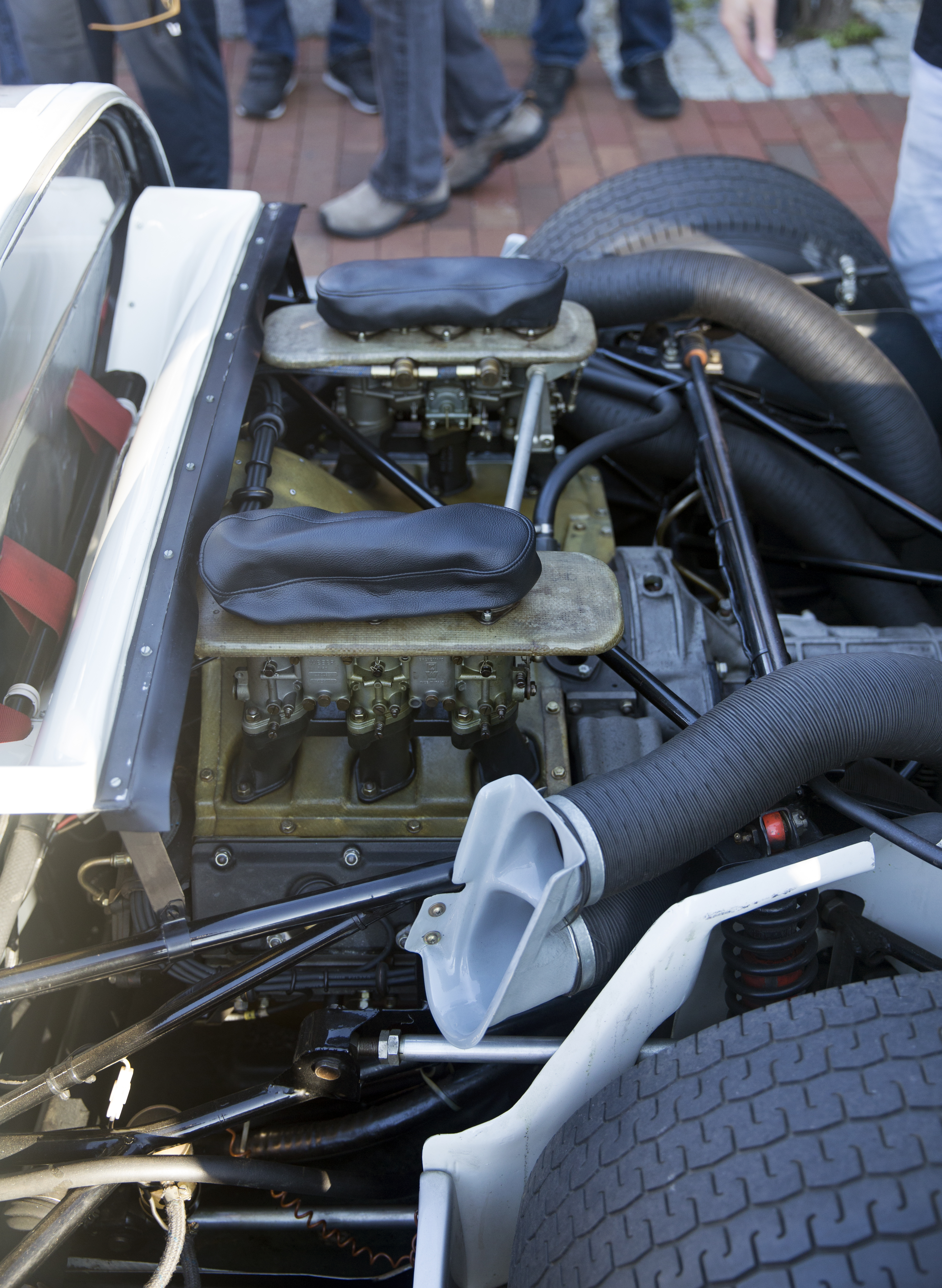
Type 906 six-cylinder engine; this example has been brought up to 2.5 litres

- 1965–1966 2.0 L (1,981 cc) 191 kW (260 PS; 256 bhp) 210 N⋅m (155 lbf⋅ft) Type 771 air-cooled, four-stroke, boxer flat-eight (906/8 Bergspyder)
- 1966 2.0 L (1,991 cc) 155 kW (211 PS; 208 bhp) 196 N⋅m (145 lbf⋅ft) air-cooled, four-stroke, boxer flat-six (906 Coupé)
- 1966 2.0 L (1,991 cc) 162 kW (220 PS; 217 bhp) 206 N⋅m (152 lbf⋅ft) air-cooled, four-stroke, boxer flat-six (906 Coupé, 906 Langheck Coupé)
- 1966 2.2 L (2,195 cc) 198 kW (269 PS; 266 bhp) 230 N⋅m (170 lbf⋅ft) Type 771 air-cooled, four-stroke, boxer flat-eight (906/8 Coupé)

=== Porsche 907 ===
- 1967 2.0 L (1,991 cc) 162 kW (220 PS; 217 bhp) 206 N⋅m (152 lbf⋅ft) Type 901 air-cooled, four-stroke, boxer flat-six (907 Langheck)
- 1968 2.2 L (2,195 cc) 198 kW (269 PS; 266 bhp) 230 N⋅m (170 lbf⋅ft) Type 771 air-cooled, four-stroke, boxer flat-eight (907 Langheck, 907 Kurzheck)
- 1968 2.0 L (1,981 cc) 198 kW (269 PS; 266 bhp) 211 N⋅m (156 lbf⋅ft) Type 771 air-cooled, four-stroke, boxer flat-eight (907 Kurzheck)

=== Porsche 908 ===
- 1968–1971 2.0 L (1,991 cc) 162 kW (220 PS; 217 bhp) 206 N⋅m (152 lbf⋅ft) Type 908 air-cooled, four-stroke, boxer flat-eight (908 Coupé, 908/02 Spyder, 908/03 Spyder)

=== Porsche 909 ===
- 1968 2.0 L (1,981 cc) 202 kW (275 PS; 271 bhp) 202 N⋅m (149 lbf⋅ft) Type 771 air-cooled, four-stroke, boxer flat-eight (909 Bergspyder)

=== Porsche 910 Carrera 10 ===
- 1966–1968 2.0 L (1,991 cc) 162 kW (220 PS; 217 bhp) 206 N⋅m (152 lbf⋅ft) Type 901 air-cooled, four-stroke, boxer flat-six (910 Coupé)
- 1967–1968 2.2 L (2,195 cc) 198 kW (269 PS; 266 bhp) 230 N⋅m (170 lbf⋅ft) Type 771 air-cooled, four-stroke, boxer flat-eight (910/8 Coupé)
- 1967–1968 2.0 L (1,981 cc) 198 kW (269 PS; 266 bhp) 211 N⋅m (156 lbf⋅ft) Type 771 air-cooled, four-stroke, boxer flat-eight (910/8 Bergspyder)

=== Porsche 911 ===
See Porsche 911

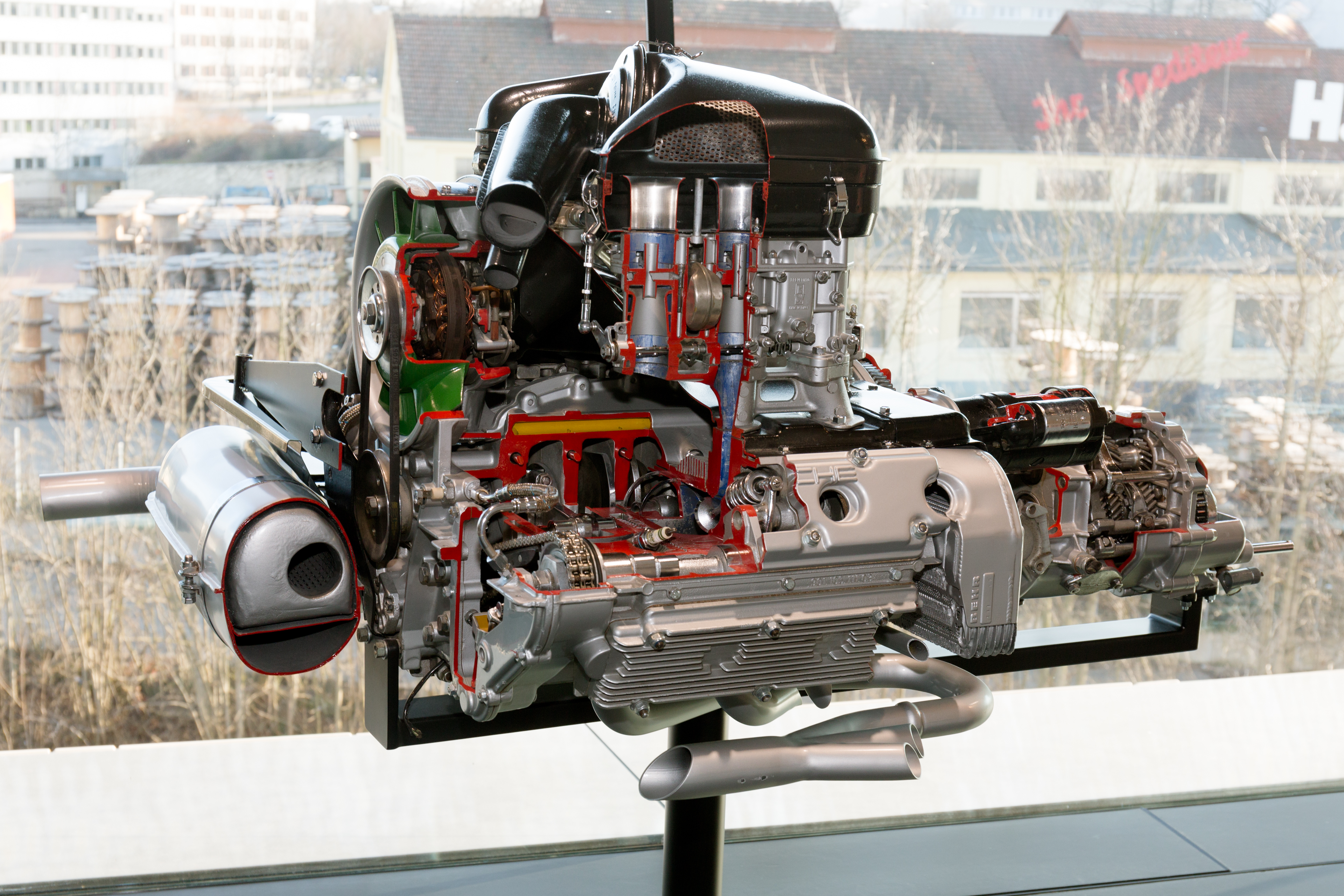
901/05 boxer flat-six

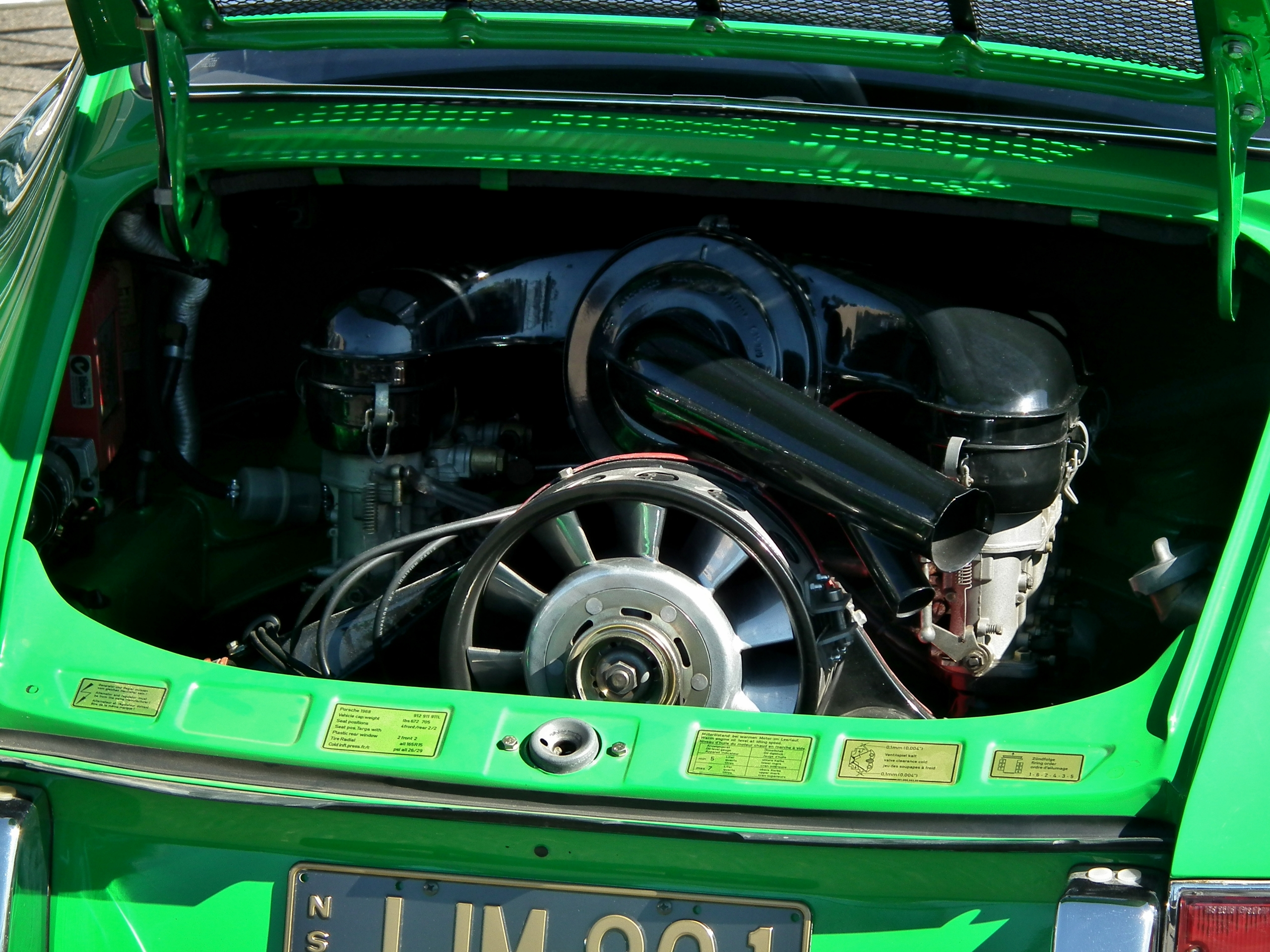
901/02 on 1968 911S

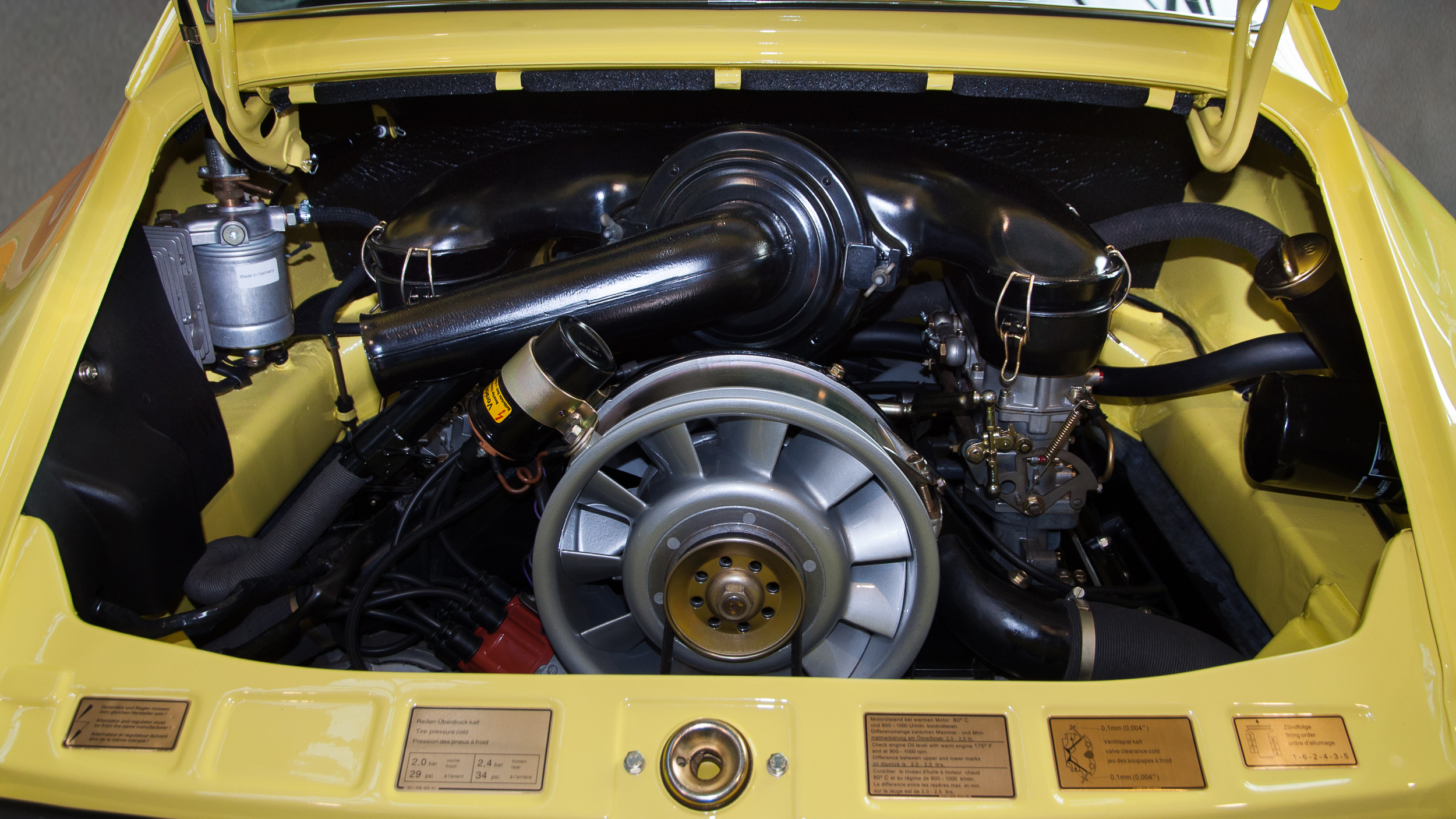
911/57 on 1973 911T

Early 911's (1963-73)

- 1963 2.0 L (1,991 cc) 96 kW (131 PS; 129 bhp) (at 6,200 rpm) 162 N⋅m (119 lb⋅ft) (at 4,600 rpm) air-cooled OHC 12-valve boxer flat-six (901)
- 1964–1968 2.0 L (1,991 cc) 96 kW (131 PS; 129 bhp) (at 6,100 rpm) 174 N⋅m (128 lb⋅ft) (at 4,200 rpm) air-cooled OHC 12-valve boxer flat-six (911, 911 L)
- 1967 2.0 L (1,991 cc) Type 916 engine air-cooled four-stroke, twin cam boxer flat-six (911R based on 906 engine)
- 1967–1969 2.0 L (1,991 cc) 118 kW (160 PS; 158 bhp) (at 6,600 rpm) 179 N⋅m (132 lb⋅ft) (at 5,200 rpm) air-cooled OHC 12-valve boxer flat-six (911 S)
- 1968–1969 2.0 L (1,991 cc) 81 kW (110 PS; 109 bhp) (at 5,800 rpm) 157 N⋅m (116 lb⋅ft) (at 4,200 rpm) air-cooled OHC 12-valve boxer flat-six (911 T)
- 1969 2.0 L (1,991 cc) 103 kW (140 PS; 138 bhp) (at 6,500 rpm) 175 N⋅m (129 lb⋅ft) (at 4,500 rpm) air-cooled OHC 12-valve boxer flat-six (911 E)
- 1970–1971 2.2 L (2,195 cc) 92 kW (125 PS; 123 bhp) (at 5,800 rpm) 176 N⋅m (130 lb⋅ft) (at 4,200 rpm) air-cooled OHC 12-valve boxer flat-six (911 T 2.2)
- 1970–1971 2.2 L (2,195 cc) 114 kW (155 PS; 153 bhp) (at 6,200 rpm) 191 N⋅m (141 lb⋅ft) (at 4,500 rpm) air-cooled OHC 12-valve boxer flat-six (911 E 2.2)
- 1970–1971 2.2 L (2,195 cc) 132 kW (179 PS; 177 bhp) (at 6,500 rpm) 199 N⋅m (147 lb⋅ft) (at 5,200 rpm) air-cooled OHC 12-valve boxer flat-six (911 S 2.2)
- 1971–1973 2.3 L (2,341 cc) 96 kW (131 PS; 129 bhp) (at 5,600 rpm) 196 N⋅m (145 lb⋅ft) (at 4,000 rpm) air-cooled OHC 12-valve boxer flat-six (911 T 2.4)
- 1972–1973 2.3 L (2,341 cc) 121 kW (165 PS; 162 bhp) (at 6,200 rpm) 206 N⋅m (152 lb⋅ft) (at 4,500 rpm) air-cooled OHC 12-valve boxer flat-six (911 E 2.4)
- 1972–1973 2.3 L (2,341 cc) 140 kW (190 PS; 188 bhp) (at 6,500 rpm) 216 N⋅m (159 lb⋅ft) (at 5,200 rpm) air-cooled OHC 12-valve boxer flat-six (911 S 2.4)
- 1972 2.7 L (2,687 cc) 154 kW (209 PS; 207 bhp) (at 6,300 rpm) 255 N⋅m (188 lb⋅ft) (at 5,100 rpm) air-cooled OHC 12-valve boxer flat-six (911 Carrera RS 2.7)

Post–1974 911's (Impact Bumper Cars)

- 1973–1975 2.7 L (2,687 cc) 110 kW (150 PS; 148 bhp) (at 5,700 rpm) 235 N⋅m (173 lb⋅ft) (at 3,800 rpm) air-cooled OHC 12-valve boxer flat-six (911)
- 1974–1975 2.7 L (2,687 cc) 129 kW (175 PS; 173 bhp) (at 5,800 rpm) 235 N⋅m (173 lb⋅ft) (at 4,000 rpm) air-cooled OHC 12-valve boxer flat-six (911 S)
- 1974–1976 2.7 L (2,687 cc) 154 kW (209 PS; 207 bhp) (at 6,300 rpm) 255 N⋅m (188 lb⋅ft) (at 5,100 rpm) air-cooled OHC 12-valve boxer flat-six (911 Carrera 2.7)
- 1974 3.0 L (2,994 cc) 169 kW (230 PS; 227 bhp) (at 6,200 rpm) 274 N⋅m (202 lb⋅ft) (at 5,000 rpm) air-cooled OHC 12-valve boxer flat-six (911 Carrera RS 3.0)
- 1975–1978 2.7 L (2,687 cc) 121 kW (165 PS; 162 bhp) (at 5,800 rpm) 235 N⋅m (173 lb⋅ft) (at 4,000 rpm) air-cooled OHC 12-valve boxer flat-six (911)
- 1975–1977 3.0 L (2,993 cc) 147 kW (200 PS; 197 bhp) (at 6,000 rpm) 255 N⋅m (188 lb⋅ft) (at 4,200 rpm) air-cooled OHC 12-valve boxer flat-six (911 Carrera 3.0)
- 1977–1979 3.0 L (2,993 cc) 132 kW (179 PS; 177 bhp) (at 5,500 rpm) 265 N⋅m (195 lb⋅ft) (at 4,200 rpm) air-cooled OHC 12-valve boxer flat-six (911 SC)
- 1979–1980 3.0 L (2,993 cc) 138 kW (188 PS; 185 bhp) (at 5,500 rpm) 265 N⋅m (195 lb⋅ft) (at 4,200 rpm) air-cooled OHC 12-valve boxer flat-six (911 SC)
- 1980–1983 3.0 L (2,993 cc) 150 kW (204 PS; 201 bhp) (at 5,900 rpm) 267 N⋅m (197 lb⋅ft) (at 4,300 rpm) air-cooled OHC 12-valve boxer flat-six (911 SC)
- 1984 3.0 L (2,994 cc) 184 kW (250 PS; 247 bhp) (at 7,000 rpm) 250 N⋅m (184 lb⋅ft) (at 6,500 rpm) air-cooled OHC 12-valve boxer flat-six (911 Carrera SC/RS)
- 1984–1989 3.2 L (3,164 cc) 170 kW (231 PS; 228 bhp) (at 5,900 rpm) 284 N⋅m (209 lb⋅ft) (at 4,800 rpm) air-cooled OHC 12-valve boxer flat-six (911 Carrera 3.2)
- 1986–1989 3.2 L (3,164 cc) 153–160 kW (208–218 PS; 205–215 bhp) (at 5,900 rpm) 165 N⋅m (122 lb⋅ft) (at 4,800 rpm) air-cooled OHC 12-valve boxer flat-six (911 Carrera 3.2 with catalytic converter)
- 1987 3.2 L (3,164 cc) 170 kW (231 PS; 228 bhp) (at 5,900 rpm) 284 N⋅m (209 lb⋅ft) (at 4,800 rpm) air-cooled OHC 12-valve boxer flat-six (911 Carrera CS)

==== 930 ====
See Porsche 911 (930)

- 1974–1977 3.0 L (2,993 cc) 191 kW (260 PS; 256 bhp) (at 5,500 rpm) 343 N⋅m (253 lb⋅ft) (at 4,000 rpm) Typ 930/50, /52, and /54 air-cooled turbo OHC 12-valve boxer flat-six (911 Turbo 3.0)
- 1976–1977 3.0 L (2,993 cc) 180 kW (245 PS; 241 bhp) Typ 930/51 and /53 air-cooled turbo OHC 12-valve boxer flat-six (911 Turbo 3.0 for USA, Canada and Japan)
- 1978–1989 3.3 L (3,299 cc) 221 kW (300 PS; 296 bhp) (at 5,500 rpm) 430 N⋅m (317 lb⋅ft) (at 4,000 rpm) Typ 930/60 air-cooled turbo OHC 12-valve boxer flat-six (911 Turbo 3.3)
- 1978–1985 3.3 L (3,299 cc) 195 kW (265 PS; 261 bhp) Typ 930/60 air-cooled turbo OHC 12-valve boxer flat-six (911 Turbo 3.3 for USA, Canada and Japan)
- 1986–1989 3.3 L (3,299 cc) 210 kW (286 PS; 282 bhp) Typ 930/60 air-cooled turbo OHC 12-valve boxer flat-six (911 Turbo 3.3 for USA, Canada and Japan)
- 1984–1989 3.3 L (3,299 cc) 243 kW (330 PS; 326 bhp) (at 5,750 rpm) 430 N⋅m (317 lb⋅ft) (at 4,000 rpm) Typ 930/60 air-cooled turbo OHC 12-valve boxer flat-six (911 Turbo 3.3 with Performancekit WLS)

Porsche 930 engines
Vehicle	Engine	MY	Engine numbers	Technical data
911 Coupe	901/01	1965	900001>	6 Cyl / 2.0L / 95 kW (127 hp)
911 Coupe	901/01	1966	903551>	6 Cyl / 2.0L / 95 kW (127 hp)
911 Coupe	901/05	1966	907001>	6 Cyl / 2.0L / 95 kW (127 hp)
911 Coupe	901/05	1967	909001>	6 Cyl / 2.0L / 95 kW (127 hp)
911 Targa	901/05	1967	911001>	6 Cyl / 2.0L / 95 kW (127 hp)
911 S Coupe/Targa	901/02	1967	960001>	6 Cyl / 2.0L / 117 kW (157 hp)
911 T Coupe/Targa	901/03	1968	2080001>	6 Cyl / 2.0L / 80 kW (107 hp)
911 T Coupe/Targa SPM	901/13	1968	2180001>	6 Cyl / 2.0L / 81 kW (109 hp)
911 L Coupe/Targa	901/06	1968	3080001>	6 Cyl / 2.0L / 95 kW (127 hp)
911 L Coupe/Targa SPM	901/07	1968	3180001>	6 Cyl / 2.0L / 96 kW (129 hp)
911 S Coupe/Targa	901/02	1968	4080001>	6 Cyl / 2.0L / 117 kW (157 hp)
911 S Coupe/Targa SPM	901/08	1968	4180001>	6 Cyl / 2.0L / 118 kW (158 hp)
911 Coupe/Targa (USA)(CDN)	901/14	1968	3280001>	6 Cyl / 2.0L / 95 kW (127 hp)
911 Coupe/Targa (USA)(CDN)	901/17	1968	3380001>	6 Cyl / 2.0L / 96 kW (129 hp)
911 L Coupe/Targa (USA)(CDN)	901/14	1968	3280001>	6 Cyl / 2.0L / 95 kW (127 hp)
911 L Coupe/Targa (USA)(CDN)	901/17	1968	3380001>	6 Cyl / 2.0L / 96 kW (129 hp)
911 T Coupe/Targa	901/03	1969	6190001>	6 Cyl / 2.0L / 80 kW (107 hp)
911 T Coupe/Targa SPM	901/13	1969	6193001>	6 Cyl / 2.0L / 81 kW (109 hp)
911 E Coupe/Targa	901/09	1969	6293001>	6 Cyl / 2.0L / 103 kW (138 hp)
911 E Coupe/Targa SPM	901/11	1969	6298001>	6 Cyl / 2.0L / 103 kW (138 hp)
911 S Coupe/Targa	901/10	1969	6398001>	6 Cyl / 2.0L / 125 kW (168 hp)
911 T Coupe (USA)(CDN)	901/16	1969	6195001>	6 Cyl / 2.0L / 80 kW (107 hp)
911 T Coupe (USA)(CDN) SPM	901/19	1969	6198001>	6 Cyl / 2.0L / 81 kW (109 hp)
911 T	911/03	1970	610 0001>>	6 Cyl / 2.2L / 92 kW (123 hp)
911 T SPM	911/06	1970	610 3001>>	6 Cyl / 2.2L / 92 kW (123 hp)
911 E	911/01	1970	620 0001>>	6 Cyl / 2.2L / 114 kW (153 hp)
911 E SPM	911/04	1970	620 8001>>	6 Cyl / 2.2L / 114 kW (153 hp)
911 S	911/02	1970	630 0001>>	6 Cyl / 2.2L / 132 kW (177 hp)
911 T (USA)(CDN)	911/07	1970	610 5001>>	6 Cyl / 2.2L / 92 kW (123 hp)
911 T SPM (USA)(CDN)	911/08	1970	610 8001>>	6 Cyl / 2.2L / 92 kW (123 hp)
911 T	911/03	1971	611 0001>>	6 Cyl / 2.2L / 92 kW (123 hp)
911 T SPM	911/06	1971	611 9001>>	6 Cyl / 2.2L / 92 kW (123 hp)
911 E	911/01	1971	621 0001>>	6 Cyl / 2.2L / 114 kW (153 hp)
911 E SPM	911/04	1971	621 8001>>	6 Cyl / 2.2L / 114 kW (153 hp)
911 S	911/02	1971	631 0001>>	6 Cyl / 2.2L / 132 kW (177 hp)
911 T (USA)(CDN)	911/07	1971	611 4001>>	6 Cyl / 2.2L / 92 kW (123 hp)
911 T SPM (USA)(CDN)	911/08	1971	611 9501>>	6 Cyl / 2.2L / 92 kW (123 hp)
911 TV	911/57	1972	652 0001>>	6 Cyl / 2.4L / 96 kW (129 hp)
911 TV SPM	911/67	1972	652 9001>>	6 Cyl / 2.4L / 96 kW (129 hp)
911 E	911/52	1972	622 0001>>	6 Cyl / 2.4L / 121 kW (162 hp)
911 E SPM	911/62	1972	622 9001>>	6 Cyl / 2.4L / 121 kW (162 hp)
911 S	911/53	1972	632 0001>>	6 Cyl / 2.4L / 140 kW (188 hp)
911 S SPM	911/63	1972	632 9001>>	6 Cyl / 2.4L / 140 kW (188 hp)
911 TE (USA)(CDN)	911/51	1972	612 0001>>	6 Cyl / 2.4L / 103 kW (138 hp)
911 TE SPM (USA)(CDN)	911/61	1972	612 9001>>	6 Cyl / 2.4L / 103 kW (138 hp)
911 TV	911/57	1973	653 0001>>	6 Cyl / 2.4L / 96 kW (129 hp)
911 TV SPM	911/67	1973	653 9001>>	6 Cyl / 2.4L / 96 kW (129 hp)
911 E	911/52	1973	623 0001>>	6 Cyl / 2.4L / 121 kW (162 hp)
911 E SPM	911/62	1973	623 9001>>	6 Cyl / 2.4L / 121 kW (162 hp)
911 S	911/53	1973	633 0001>>	6 Cyl / 2.4L / 140 kW (188 hp)
911 S SPM	911/63	1973	633 9001>>	6 Cyl / 2.4L / 140 kW (188 hp)
911 Carrera	911/83	1973	663 0001>>	6 Cyl / 2.7L / 155 kW (208 hp)
911 TE (USA)(CDN)	911/51	1973	613 0001>>	6 Cyl / 2.4L / 103 kW (138 hp)
911 TE SPM (USA)(CDN)	911/61	1973	613 9001>>	6 Cyl / 2.4L / 103 kW (138 hp)
911 TK (USA)(CDN)	911/91	1973	613 3001>>	6 Cyl / 2.4L / 103 kW (138 hp)
911 TK SPM (USA)(CDN)	911/96	1973	613 9301>>	6 Cyl / 2.4L / 103 kW (138 hp)
911	911/92	1974	4 614 0001>>	6 Cyl / 2.7L / 110 kW (148 hp)
911 SPM	911/97	1974	4 614 9001>>	6 Cyl / 2.7L / 110 kW (148 hp)
911 S	911/93	1974	4 634 0001>>	6 Cyl / 2.7L / 129 kW (173 hp)
911 S SPM	911/98	1974	4 634 9001>>	6 Cyl / 2.7L / 129 kW (173 hp)
911 Carrera 2.7	911/83	1974	4 664 0001>>	6 Cyl / 2.7L / 154 kW (207 hp)
911 Carrera (USA)(CDN)	911/93	1974	4 634 0001>>	6 Cyl / 2.7L / 129 kW (173 hp)
911 Carrera SPM (USA)(CDN)	911/98	1974	4 634 9001>>	6 Cyl / 2.7L / 129 kW (173 hp)
911	911/41	1975	5 615 0001>>	6 Cyl / 2.7L / 110 kW (148 hp)
911 SPM	911/46	1975	5 615 9001>>	6 Cyl / 2.7L / 110 kW (148 hp)
911 S	911/42	1975	5 635 0001>>	6 Cyl / 2.7L / 129 kW (173 hp)
911 S SPM	911/47	1975	5 635 9001>>	6 Cyl / 2.7L / 129 kW (173 hp)
911 Carrera 2.7	911/83	1975	5 665 0001>>	6 Cyl / 2.7L / 154 kW (207 hp)
911 S Carrera (USA)(CDN)	911/43	1975	5 645 0001>>	6 Cyl / 2.7L / 121 kW (162 hp)
930 S Carrera SPM (USA)(CDN)	911/48	1975	5 645 9001>>	6 Cyl / 2.7L / 121 kW (162 hp)
911 S Carrera (CAL)	911/44	1975	5 655 0001>>	6 Cyl / 2.7L / 118 kW (158 hp)
911 S Carrera SPM (CAL)	911/49	1975	5 655 9001>>	6 Cyl / 2.7L / 118 kW (158 hp)
911	911/81	1976	6 636 0001>>	6 Cyl / 2.7L / 121 kW (162 hp)
911 SPM	911/86	1976	6 636 9001>>	6 Cyl / 2.7L / 121 kW (162 hp)
911 Carrera 2.7	911/83	1976	6 666 8001>>	6 Cyl / 2.7L / 154 kW (207 hp)
911 Carrera 3.0	930/02	1976	6 666 0001>>	6 Cyl / 3.0L / 147 kW (197 hp)
911 Carrera 3.0 SPM	930/12	1976	6 666 9001>>	6 Cyl / 3.0L / 147 kW (197 hp)
911 S (USA)(CDN)	911/82	1976	6 646 0001>>	6 Cyl / 2.7L / 121 kW (162 hp)
911 S SPM (USA)(CDN)	911/89	1976	6 656 9001>>	6 Cyl / 2.7L / 121 kW (162 hp)
911 S (CAL)	911/84	1976	6 656 0001>>	6 Cyl / 2.7L / 121 kW (162 hp)
911 (J)	911/41	1976	6 616 0001>>	6 Cyl / 2.7L / 110 kW (148 hp)
911 S (J)	911/81	1976	6 636 0001>>	6 Cyl / 2.7L / 121 kW (162 hp)
911 S SPM (J)	911/86	1976	6 636 9001>>	6 Cyl / 2.7L / 121 kW (162 hp)
911	911/81	1977	7 637 0001>>	6 Cyl / 2.7L / 121 kW (162 hp)
911 SPM	911/86	1977	7 637 9001>>	6 Cyl / 2.7L / 121 kW (162 hp)
911 Carrera 3.0	930/02	1977	7 667 0001>>	6 Cyl / 3.0L / 147 kW (197 hp)
911 Carrera 3.0 SPM	930/12	1977	7 667 9001>>	6 Cyl / 3.0L / 147 kW (197 hp)
911 S (USA)(CDN)	911/85	1977	7 627 0001>>	6 Cyl / 2.7L / 121 kW (162 hp)
911 S SPM (USA)(CDN)	911/90	1977	7 627 9001>>	6 Cyl / 2.7L / 121 kW (162 hp)
911 S (J)	911/94	1977	7 617 0001>>	6 Cyl / 2.7L / 121 kW (162 hp)
911 S SPM (J)	911/99	1977	7 617 9001>>	6 Cyl / 2.7L / 121 kW (162 hp)
911 SC	930/03	1978	8 638 0001>9000	6 Cyl / 3.0L / 132 kW (177 hp)
911 SC SPM	930/13	1978	8 638 9001>>	6 Cyl / 3.0L / 132 kW (177 hp)
930 Turbo	930/60	1978	8 678 0001>>	6 Cyl / 3.3L / 221 kW (296 hp)
911 SC (USA)(CDN)	930/04	1978	8 628 0001>>	6 Cyl / 3.0L / 132 kW (177 hp)
930 Turbo (USA)(CDN)	930/61	1978	8 688 0001>>	6 Cyl / 3.3L / 195 kW (261 hp)
911 SC (CAL)	930/06	1978	8 658 0001>>	6 Cyl / 3.0L / 132 kW (177 hp)
930 Turbo (CAL)	930/63	1978	8 688 1001>>	6 Cyl / 3.3L / 195 kW (261 hp)
911 SC (J)	930/05	1978	8 618 0001>9000	6 Cyl / 3.0L / 132 kW (177 hp)
911 SC SPM	930/15	1978	8 618 9001>>	6 Cyl / 3.0L / 132 kW (177 hp)
930 Turbo	930/62	1978	8 678 2001>>	6 Cyl / 3.3L / 195 kW (261 hp)
911 SC	930/03	1979	9 639 0001>9000	6 Cyl / 3.0L / 132 kW (177 hp)
911 SC SPM	930/13	1979	9 639 9001>>	6 Cyl / 3.0L / 132 kW (177 hp)
930 Turbo	930/60	1979	9 679 0001>>	6 Cyl / 3.3L / 221 kW (296 hp)
911 SC (USA)(CDN)	930/04	1979	9 629 0001>>	6 Cyl / 3.0L / 132 kW (177 hp)
930 Turbo (USA)(CDN)	930/64	1979	9 689 0001>>	6 Cyl / 3.3L / 195 kW (261 hp)
911 SC (CAL)	930/06	1979	9 659 0001>>	6 Cyl / 3.0L / 132 kW (177 hp)
930 Turbo (CAL)	930/63	1979	9 689 1001>2000	6 Cyl / 3.3L / 195 kW (261 hp)
911 SC (J)	930/05	1979	9 619 0001>9000	6 Cyl / 3.0L / 132 kW (177 hp)
911 SC SPM	930/15	1979	9 619 9001>>	6 Cyl / 3.0L / 132 kW (177 hp)
930 Turbo (J)	930/65	1979	9 679 1001>2000	6 Cyl / 3.3L / 195 kW (261 hp)
911 SC	930/09	1980	A 630 0001>8000	6 Cyl / 3.0L / 138 kW (185 hp)
911 SPM	930/19	1980	A 630 9001>9999	6 Cyl / 3.0L / 138 kW (185 hp)
930 Turbo	930/60	1980	A 670 0001>1000	6 Cyl / 3.3L / 221 kW (296 hp)
911 SC (USA)(CDN)	930/07	1980	A 640 0001>9999	6 Cyl / 3.0L / 132 kW (177 hp)
911 SC (J)	930/08	1980	A 630 8001>9000	6 Cyl / 3.0L / 132 kW (177 hp)
930 Turbo (J)	930/65	1980	A 670 8001>9000	6 Cyl / 3.3L / 195 kW (261 hp)
911 SC	930/10	1981	B 631 0001>8000	6 Cyl / 3.0L / 150 kW (201 hp)
930 Turbo	930/60	1981	B 671 0001>1000	6 Cyl / 3.3L / 221 kW (296 hp)
911 SC (USA)(CDN)	930/16	1981	B 641 0001>9999	6 Cyl / 3.0L / 132 kW (177 hp)
930 Turbo (CDN)	930/60	1981	B 671 0001>1000	6 Cyl / 3.3L / 221 kW (296 hp)
911 SC (J)	930/17	1981	B 631 8001>9000	6 Cyl / 3.0L / 132 kW (177 hp)
911 SC	930/10	1982	C 63C 0001>8000	6 Cyl / 3.0L / 150 kW (201 hp)
930 Turbo	930/60	1982	C 67C 0001>1000	6 Cyl / 3.3L / 221 kW (296 hp)
911 SC (USA)(CDN)	930/16	1982	C 64C 0001>9999	6 Cyl / 3.0L / 132 kW (177 hp)
930 Turbo (CDN)	930/60	1982	C 67C 0001>1000	6 Cyl / 3.3L / 221 kW (296 hp)
911 SC	930/17	1982	C 63C 8001>9000	6 Cyl / 3.0L / 132 kW (177 hp)
911 SC	930/10	1983	D 63D 0001>8000	6 Cyl / 3.0L / 150 kW (201 hp)
930 Turbo	930/66	1983	D 67D 0001>1000	6 Cyl / 3.3L / 221 kW (296 hp)
911 SC (USA)(CDN)	930/16	1983	D 64D 0001>9999	6 Cyl / 3.0L / 132 kW (177 hp)
930 Turbo (CDN)	930/66	1983	D 67D 0001>1000	6 Cyl / 3.3L / 221 kW (296 hp)
911 SC (J)	930/17	1983	D 63D 8001>9000	6 Cyl / 3.0L / 132 kW (177 hp)
911 Carrera	930/20	1984	E 63E 00001>10000	6 Cyl / 3.2L / 170 kW (228 hp)
911 Carrera (USA)(CDN)(J)	930/21	1984	E 64E 00001>10000	6 Cyl / 3.2L / 152 kW (204 hp)
930 Turbo	930/66	1984	E 67E 00001>01000	6 Cyl / 3.3L / 221 kW (296 hp)
911 Carrera	930/20	1985	F 63F 00001>10000	6 Cyl / 3.2L / 170 kW (228 hp)
911 Carrera (USA)(CDN)(J)/M298	930/21	1985	F 64F 00001>10000	6 Cyl / 3.2L / 152 kW (204 hp)
911 Carrera (AUS)(S)(CH)	930/26	1985	F 63F 10001>11000	6 Cyl / 3.2L / 170 kW (228 hp)
930 Turbo	930/66	1985	F 67F 00001>01000	6 Cyl / 3.3L / 221 kW (296 hp)
911 Carrera	930/20	1986	G 63G 00001>10000	6 Cyl / 3.2L / 170 kW (228 hp)
911 Carrera (USA)(CDN)(J)(AUS)/M298	930/21	1986	G 64G 00001>10000	6 Cyl / 3.2L / 152 kW (204 hp)
911 Carrera (S)(CH)	930/26	1986	G 63G 10001>11000	6 Cyl / 3.2L / 170 kW (228 hp)
930 Turbo	930/66	1986	G 67G 00001>02000	6 Cyl / 3.3L / 221 kW (296 hp)
930 Turbo (USA)	930/68	1986	G 68G 00001>02000	6 Cyl / 3.3L / 209 kW (280 hp)
911 Carrera	930/20	1987	H 63H 00001>10000	6 Cyl / 3.2L / 170 kW (228 hp)
911 Carrera (catalytic conv.)	930/25	1987	H 64H 00001>10000	6 Cyl / 3.2L / 160 kW (215 hp)
911 Carrera (S)	930/26	1987	H 63H 10001>11000	6 Cyl / 3.2L / 170 kW (228 hp)
930 Turbo	930/66	1987	H 67H 00001>05000	6 Cyl / 3.3L / 221 kW (296 hp)
930 Turbo (USA)	930/68	1987	H 68H 00001>05000	6 Cyl / 3.3L / 210 kW (282 hp)
911 Carrera	930/20	1988	J 63J 00001>10000	6 Cyl / 3.2L / 170 kW (228 hp)
911 Carrera (catalytic conv.)	930/25	1988	J 64J 00001>10000	6 Cyl / 3.2L / 160 kW (215 hp)
911 Carrera (S)	930/26	1988	J 63J 10001>11000	6 Cyl / 3.2L / 170 kW (228 hp)
930 Turbo	930/66	1988	J 67J 00001>05000	6 Cyl / 3.3L / 221 kW (296 hp)
930 Turbo (USA)	930/68	1988	J 68J 00001>05000	6 Cyl / 3.3L / 210 kW (282 hp)
911 Carrera	930/20	1989	K 63K 00001>10000	6 Cyl / 3.2L / 170 kW (228 hp)
911 Carrera (catalytic conv.)	930/25	1989	K 64K 00001>10000	6 Cyl / 3.2L / 160 kW (215 hp)
930 Turbo	930/66	1989	K 67K 00001>05000	6 Cyl / 3.3L / 221 kW (296 hp)
930 Turbo (USA)(CDN)	930/68	1989	K 68K 00001>05000	6 Cyl / 3.3L / 210 kW (282 hp)

==== 964 ====
See Porsche 911 (964)

- 1989–1994 3.6 L (3,600 cc) 184 kW (250 PS; 247 bhp) (at 6,100 rpm) 310 N⋅m (229 lb⋅ft) (at 4,800 rpm) air-cooled OHC 12-valve boxer flat-six (911 Carrera 2, Carrera 4, Carrera 30 Jahre 911, Carrera RS America, Speedster)
- 1991–1992 3.6 L (3,600 cc) 191 kW (260 PS; 256 bhp) (at 6,200 rpm) 325 N⋅m (240 lb⋅ft) (at 4,800 rpm) air-cooled OHC 12-valve boxer flat-six (911 Carrera RS)
- 1991–1994 3.3 L (3,299 cc) 235 kW (320 PS; 315 bhp) (at 5,750 rpm) 450 N⋅m (332 lb⋅ft) (at 4,400 rpm) air-cooled turbo OHC 12-valve boxer flat-six (911 Turbo)
- 1991–1992 3.3 L (3,299 cc) 280 kW (381 PS; 375 bhp) (at 6,000 rpm) 490 N⋅m (361 lb⋅ft) (at 4,800 rpm) air-cooled turbo OHC 12-valve boxer flat-six (911 Turbo S)
- 1993–1994 3.6 L (3,600 cc) 265 kW (360 PS; 355 bhp) (at 5,500 rpm) 520 N⋅m (384 lb⋅ft) (at 4,200 rpm) air-cooled turbo OHC 12-valve boxer flat-six (911 Turbo 3.6)
- 1993 3.7 L (3,746 cc) 221 kW (300 PS; 296 bhp) (at 6,500 rpm) 360 N⋅m (266 lb⋅ft) (at 5,250 rpm) air-cooled OHC 12-valve boxer flat-six (911 Carrera RS 3.8)
- 1990–1991 3.6 L (3,600 cc) 195 kW (265 PS; 261 bhp) (at 6,100 rpm) 310 N⋅m (229 lb⋅ft) (at 4,800 rpm) air-cooled OHC 12-valve boxer flat-six (911 Cup)
- 1992–1993 3.6 L (3,600 cc) 202 kW (275 PS; 271 bhp) (at 6,100 rpm) 314 N⋅m (232 lb⋅ft) (at 4,800 rpm) air-cooled OHC 12-valve boxer flat-six (911 Cup)
- 1994 3.7 L (3,746 cc) 239 kW (325 PS; 321 bhp) (at 6,900 rpm) air-cooled OHC 12-valve boxer flat-six (911 Carrera RSR 3.8)

Porsche 964 engines
Vehicle	Engine	MY	Engine numbers	Technical data
964 Carrera 4	M64.01	1989	K 62K 00501>10000	6 Cyl / 3.6L / 184 kW (247 hp)
964 Carrera 2/4	M64.01	1990	L 62L 00501>50000	6 Cyl / 3.6L / 184 kW (247 hp)
964 Carrera 2 Tiptronic	M64.02	1990	L 62L 50501>60000	6 Cyl / 3.6L / 184 kW (247 hp)
964 Carrera 2/4	M64.01	1991	M 62M 00501>20000	6 Cyl / 3.6L / 184 kW (247 hp)
964 Carrera 2 Tiptronic	M64.02	1991	M 62M 50501>60000	6 Cyl / 3.6L / 184 kW (247 hp)
964 Turbo	M30.69	1991	M 61M 00501>50000	6 Cyl / 3.3L / 235 kW (315 hp)
964 Carrera 2/4	M64.01	1992	N 62N 00501>20000	6 Cyl / 3.6L / 184 kW (247 hp)
964 Carrera 2 Tiptronic	M64.02	1992	N 62N 50501>60000	6 Cyl / 3.6L / 184 kW (247 hp)
964 Carrera RS	M64.03	1992	N 62N 80501>90000	6 Cyl / 3.6L / 191 kW (256 hp)
964 Turbo	M30.69	1992	N 61N 00501>20000	6 Cyl / 3.3L / 235 kW (315 hp)
964 Carrera 2/4	M64.01	1993	P 62P 00501>20000	6 Cyl / 3.6L / 184 kW (247 hp)
964 Carrera 2 Tiptronic	M64.02	1993	P 62P 50501>60000	6 Cyl / 3.6L / 184 kW (247 hp)
964 Turbo 3.6	M64.50	1993	P 61P 00501>20000	6 Cyl / 3.6L / 265 kW (355 hp)
964 Carrera 2/4	M64.01	1994	R 62R 00501>20000	6 Cyl / 3.6L / 184 kW (247 hp)
964 Carrera 2 Tiptronic	M64.02	1994	R 62R 50501>60000	6 Cyl / 3.6L / 184 kW (247 hp)
964 Turbo 3.6	M64.50	1994	R 61R 00501>20000	6 Cyl / 3.6L / 265 kW (355 hp)

==== 993 ====
See Porsche 911 (993)

- 1993–1995 3.6 L (3,600 cc) 200 kW (272 PS; 268 bhp) (at 6,100 rpm) 330 N⋅m (243 lb⋅ft) (at 5,000 rpm) air-cooled OHC 12-valve boxer flat-six (911 Carrera 2, Carrera 4)
- 1995 3.7 L (3,746 cc) 221 kW (300 PS; 296 bhp) (at 6,500 rpm) 355 N⋅m (262 lb⋅ft) (at 5,400 rpm) air-cooled OHC 12-valve boxer flat-six (911 Carrera RS)
- 1995–1998 3.6 L (3,600 cc) 316 kW (430 PS; 424 bhp) (at 5,750 rpm) 540 N⋅m (398 lb⋅ft) (at 5,400 rpm) air-cooled OHC 12-valve boxer flat-six (911 GT2)
- 1996–1998 3.6 L (3,600 cc) 210 kW (286 PS; 282 bhp) (at 6,500 rpm) 340 N⋅m (251 lb⋅ft) (at 5,250 rpm) air-cooled OHC 12-valve boxer flat-six (911 Carrera 2, Carrera 4, Carrera S, Carrera 4S)
- 1996–1998 3.6 L (3,600 cc) 220 kW (299 PS; 295 bhp) (at 6,500 rpm) 340 N⋅m (251 lb⋅ft) (at 5,250 rpm) air-cooled OHC 12-valve boxer flat-six (911 Carrera 2, Carrera 4, Carrera S, Carrera 4S with Performancekit WLS)
- 1996–1998 3.6 L (3,600 cc) 300 kW (408 PS; 402 bhp) (at 5,750 rpm) 540 N⋅m (398 lb⋅ft) (at 4,500 rpm) biturbo air-cooled OHC 12-valve boxer flat-six (911 Turbo)
- 1996–1998 3.6 L (3,600 cc) 316 kW (430 PS; 424 bhp) (at 5,750 rpm) 540 N⋅m (398 lb⋅ft) (at 4,500 rpm) biturbo air-cooled OHC 12-valve boxer flat-six (911 Turbo with Performancekit WLS 1)
- 1997–1998 3.6 L (3,600 cc) 330 kW (449 PS; 443 bhp) (at 5,750 rpm) 540 N⋅m (398 lb⋅ft) (at 4,500 rpm) biturbo air-cooled OHC 12-valve boxer flat-six (911 Turbo with Performancekit WLS 2, Turbo S)
- 1994–1995 3.7 L (3,746 cc) 228 kW (310 PS; 306 bhp) (at 6,100 rpm) 360 N⋅m (266 lb⋅ft) (at 5,500 rpm) air-cooled OHC 12-valve boxer flat-six (911 Cup 3.8)
- 1996–1997 3.7 L (3,746 cc) 232 kW (315 PS; 311 bhp) (at 6,200 rpm) 370 N⋅m (273 lb⋅ft) (at 5,500 rpm) air-cooled OHC 12-valve boxer flat-six (911 Cup 3.8)
- 1997–1998 3.7 L (3,746 cc) 257 kW (349 PS; 345 bhp) (at 7,000 rpm) 380 N⋅m (280 lb⋅ft) (at 5,500 rpm) air-cooled OHC 12-valve boxer flat-six (911 Cup 3.8 RSR)
- 1995–1998 3.6 L (3,600 cc) 330 kW (449 PS; 443 bhp) (at 5,750 rpm) 540 N⋅m (398 lb⋅ft) (at 5,400 rpm) biturbo air-cooled OHC 12-valve boxer flat-six (911 GT2 R)
- 1998 3.6 L (3,600 cc) 345 kW (469 PS; 463 bhp) (at 5,750 rpm) 665 N⋅m (490 lb⋅ft) biturbo air-cooled OHC 12-valve boxer flat-six (911 GT2 R)
- 1995–1997 3.6 L (3,600 cc) 442 kW (601 PS; 593 bhp) (at 7,000 rpm) biturbo air-cooled OHC 12-valve boxer flat-six (911 GT2 Evolution)

Porsche 993 engines
Vehicle	Engine	MY	Engine numbers	Technical data
993 Carrera	M64.05	1994	R 63R 00501>20000	6 Cyl / 3.6L / 200 kW (268 hp)
993 Carrera (USA)(CDN)	M64.07	1994	R 64R 00501>20000	6 Cyl / 3.6L / 200 kW (268 hp)
993 Carrera Tiptronic	M64.06	1994	R 63R 50501>60000	6 Cyl / 3.6L / 200 kW (268 hp)
993 Carrera Tiptronic (USA/CDN)	M64.08	1994	R 64R 50501>60000	6 Cyl / 3.6L / 200 kW (268 hp)
993 Carrera	M64.05	1995	S 63S 00501>20000	6 Cyl / 3.6L / 200 kW (268 hp)
993 Carrera (USA)(CDN)	M64.07	1995	S 64S 00501>20000	6 Cyl / 3.6L / 200 kW (268 hp)
993 Carrera RS	M64.20	1995	S 63S 85501>90000	6 Cyl / 3.75L / 220 kW (295 hp)
993 Carrera Tiptronic	M64.06	1995	S 63S 50501>60000	6 Cyl / 3.6L / 200 kW (268 hp)
993 Carrera Tiptronic (USA/CDN)	M64.08	1995	S 64S 50501>60000	6 Cyl / 3.6L / 200 kW (268 hp)
993 Carrera 4	M64.05	1995	S 63S 00501>20000	6 Cyl / 3.6L / 200 kW (268 hp)
993 Carrera 4 (USA)(CDN)	M64.07	1995	S 64S 00501>20000	6 Cyl / 3.6L / 200 kW (268 hp)
993 Turbo	M64.60	1995	S 61T 00501>20000	6 Cyl / 3.6L / 300 kW (402 hp)
993 Carrera	M64.21	1996	T 63T 00501>20000	6 Cyl / 3.6L / 210 kW (282 hp)
993 Carrera (USA)(CDN)	M64.23	1996	T 64T 00501>20000	6 Cyl / 3.6L / 210 kW (282 hp)
993 Carrera RS	M64.20	1996	T 63T 85501>90000	6 Cyl / 3.75L / 220 kW (295 hp)
993 Carrera Tiptronic	M64.22	1996	T 63T 50501>60000	6 Cyl / 3.6L / 210 kW (282 hp)
993 Carrera Tiptronic (USA/CDN)	M64.24	1996	T 64T 50501>60000	6 Cyl / 3.6L / 210 kW (282 hp)
993 Carrera 4	M64.21	1996	T 63T 00501>20000	6 Cyl / 3.6L / 210 kW (282 hp)
993 Carrera 4 (USA)(CDN)	M64.23	1996	T 64T 00501>20000	6 Cyl / 3.6L / 210 kW (282 hp)
993 Turbo	M64.60	1996	T 61T 00501>20000	6 Cyl / 3.6L / 300 kW (402 hp)
993 Carrera	M64.21	1997	V 63V 00501>20000	6 Cyl / 3.6L / 210 kW (282 hp)
993 Carrera (USA)(CDN)	M64.23	1997	V 64V 00501>20000	6 Cyl / 3.6L / 210 kW (282 hp)
993 Carrera Tiptronic	M64.22	1997	V 63V 50501>60000	6 Cyl / 3.6L / 210 kW (282 hp)
993 Carrera TIP (USA/CDN)	M64.24	1997	V 64V 50501>60000	6 Cyl / 3.6L / 210 kW (282 hp)
993 Carrera 4	M64.21	1997	V 63V 00501>20000	6 Cyl / 3.6L / 210 kW (282 hp)
993 Carrera 4 (USA)(CDN)	M64.23	1997	V 64V 00501>20000	6 Cyl / 3.6L / 210 kW (282 hp)
993 Turbo	M64.60	1997	V 61V 00501>20000	6 Cyl / 3.6L / 300 kW (402 hp)

==== 996 ====
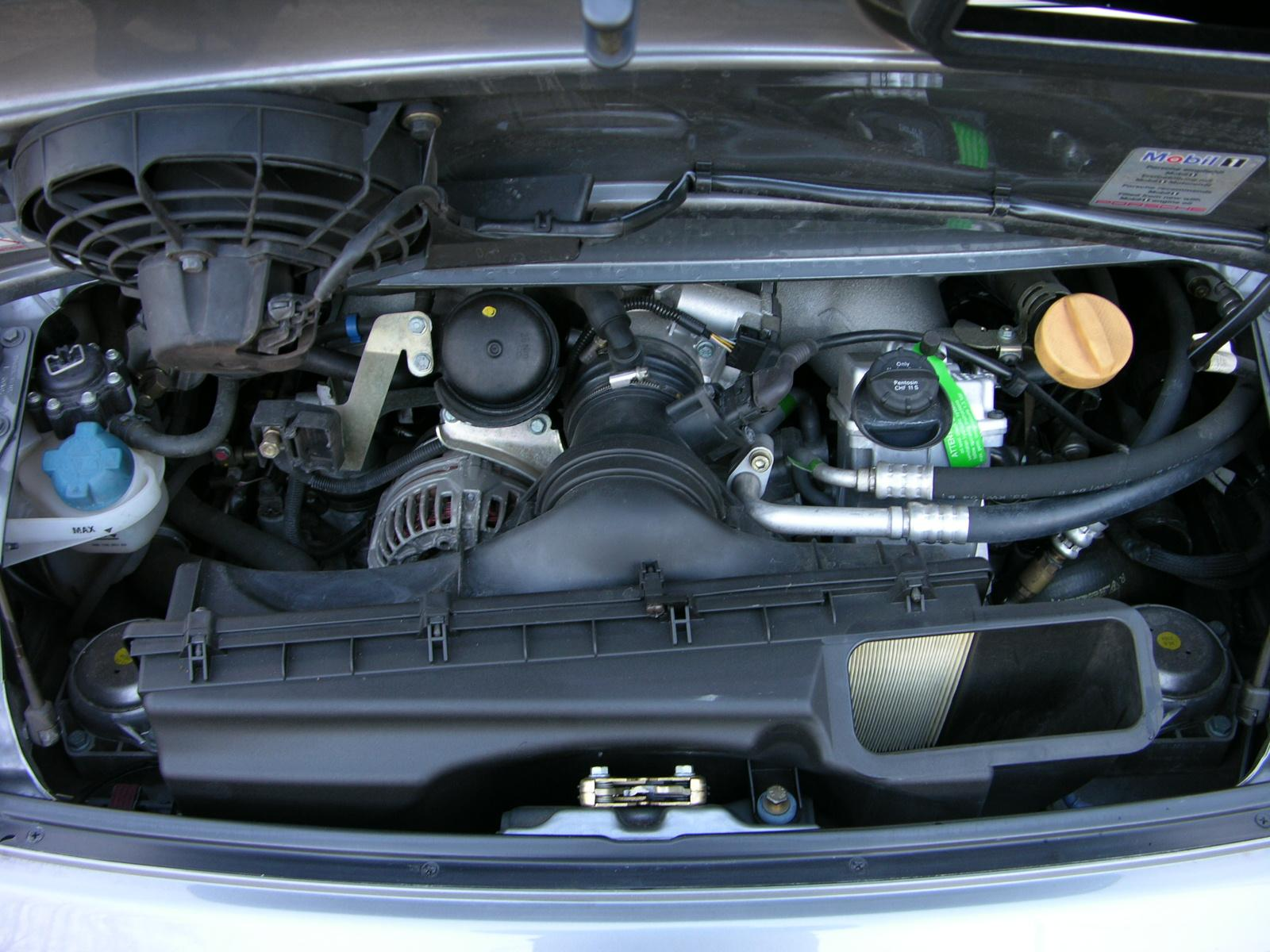
2005 911 GT3 engine bay

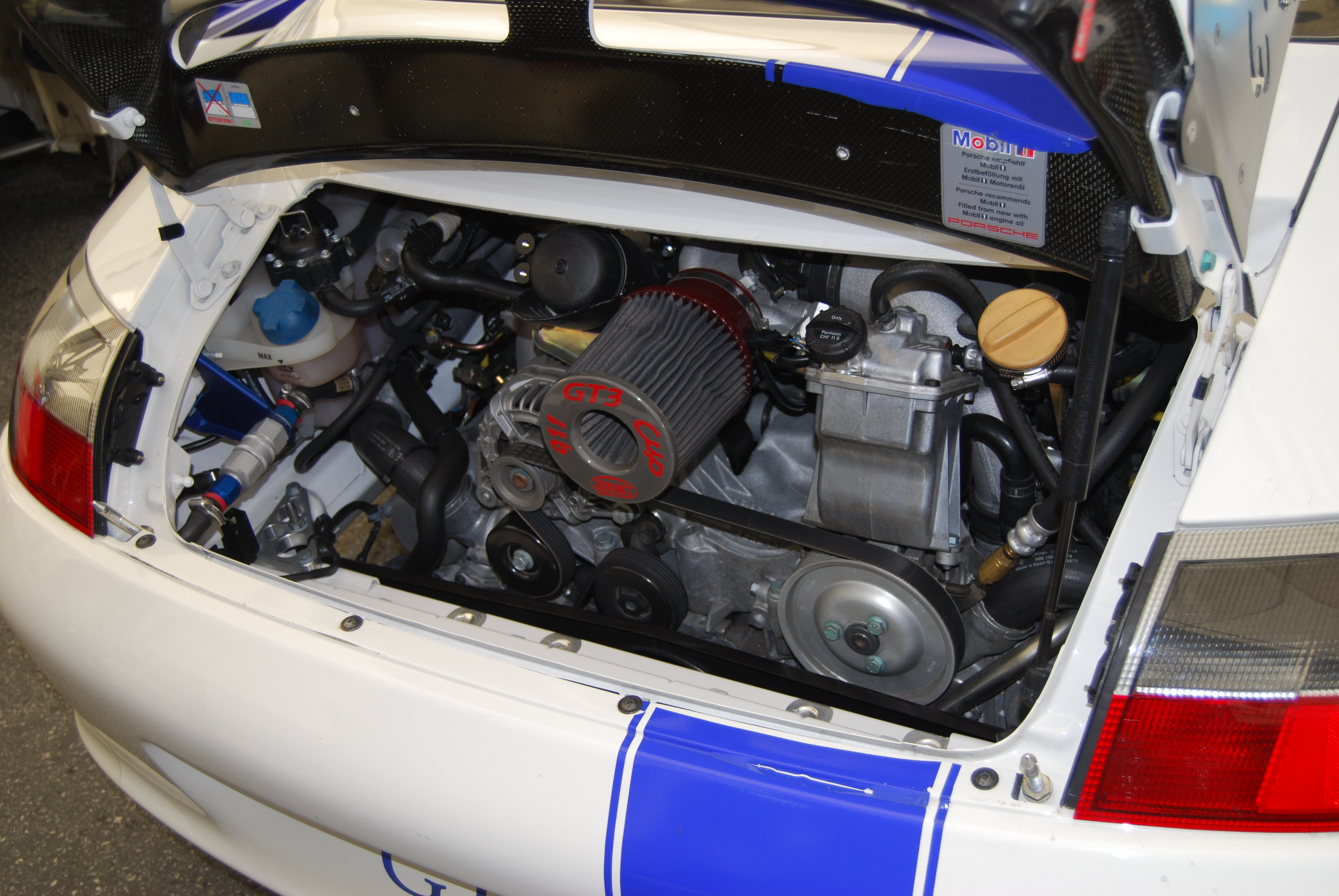
911 GT3 Cup engine bay

- 1998–2001 3.4 L (3,387 cc) 300 PS (221 kW; 296 bhp) 350 N⋅m (258 lb⋅ft) water-cooled DOHC 24-valve boxer flat-six (VarioCam) (Carrera)
- 1999–2004 3.6 L (3,600 cc) 420 PS (309 kW; 414 bhp) 560 N⋅m (413 lb⋅ft) water cooled biturbo DOHC 24-valve boxer flat-six (Turbo)
- 1999–2001 3.6 L (3,600 cc) 360 PS (265 kW; 355 bhp) 370 N⋅m (273 lb⋅ft) water-cooled DOHC 24-valve boxer flat six (GT3)
- 2000–2003 3.6 L (3,600 cc) 462 PS (340 kW; 456 bhp) 620 N⋅m (457 lb⋅ft) water cooled biturbo DOHC 24-valve boxer flat-six (GT2)
- 2002–2004 3.6 L (3,596 cc) 320 PS (235 kW; 316 bhp) 370 N⋅m (273 lb⋅ft) water-cooled DOHC 24-valve boxer flat-six (VarioCam Plus) (Carrera, Carrera 4, Carrera 4S, Targa)
- 2004–2005 3.6 L (3,600 cc) 450 PS (331 kW; 444 bhp) 620 N⋅m (457 lb⋅ft) water cooled biturbo DOHC 24-valve boxer flat-six (Turbo S)
- 2004–2005 3.6 L (3,600 cc) 381 PS (280 kW; 376 bhp) 385 N⋅m (284 lb⋅ft) water-cooled DOHC 24-valve boxer flat six (GT3)
- 2004–2005 3.6 L (3,600 cc) 483 PS (355 kW; 476 bhp) 640 N⋅m (472 lb⋅ft) water cooled biturbo DOHC 24-valve boxer flat-six (GT2)
- 1998 3.6 L (3,600 cc) 265 kW (360 PS; 355 bhp) (at 7,200 rpm) 360 N⋅m (266 lb⋅ft) (at 6,250 rpm) water-cooled DOHC 24-valve boxer flat six (911 GT3 Cup)
- 1999–2001 3.6 L (3,600 cc) 272 kW (370 PS; 365 bhp) (at 7,200 rpm) 370 N⋅m (273 lb⋅ft) (at 6,250 rpm) water-cooled DOHC 24-valve boxer flat six (911 GT3 Cup)
- 2002–2003 3.6 L (3,600 cc) 280 kW (381 PS; 375 bhp) (at 7,200 rpm) 380 N⋅m (280 lb⋅ft) (at 6,250 rpm) water-cooled DOHC 24-valve boxer flat six (911 GT3 Cup)
- 2004 3.6 L (3,600 cc) 287 kW (390 PS; 385 bhp) (at 7,200 rpm) 390 N⋅m (288 lb⋅ft) (at 6,500 rpm) water-cooled DOHC 24-valve boxer flat six (911 GT3 Cup)
- 1999–2001 3.6 L (3,600 cc) 302 kW (411 PS; 405 bhp) (at 8,200 rpm) water-cooled DOHC 24-valve boxer flat six (911 GT3 R, GT3 RS)
- 2005–2008 3.6 L (3,600 cc) 294 kW (400 PS; 394 bhp) (at 7,000 rpm) 400 N⋅m (295 lb⋅ft) (at 6,500 rpm) water-cooled DOHC 24-valve boxer flat six (911 GT3 RSR)

Porsche 996 engines
Vehicle	Engine	MY	Engine numbers	Technical data
996 Carrera	M96.01	1998	W66W 00501>60000	6 Cyl / 3.4L / 220 kW (295 hp)
996 Carrera	M96.01	1999	X66X 00501>60000	6 Cyl / 3.4L / 220 kW (295 hp)
996 Carrera +M620 C4	M96.02	1999	X68X 00501>60000	6 Cyl / 3.4L / 220 kW (295 hp)
996 Carrera 2/4	M96.04	2000	Y66Y 00501>60000	6 Cyl / 3.4L / 220 kW (295 hp)
996 Carrera 2/4	M96.04	2001	1661 00501>60000	6 Cyl / 3.4L / 220 kW (295 hp)
996 Carrera 2/4/4S FL	M96.03	2002	2662 00501>60000	6 Cyl / 3.6L / 232 kW (311 hp)
996 Carrera 2/4/4S FL	M96.03	2003	3663 00501>60000	6 Cyl / 3.6L / 235 kW (315 hp)
996 Carrera 2/4/4S FL	M96.03	2004	4664 00501>60000	6 Cyl / 3.6L / 235 kW (315 hp)
996 Carrera 2 40th Jahre	M96.03S	2004	4664 00501>60000	6 Cyl / 3.6L / 254 kW (341 hp)
996 Carrera 2/4/4S FL	M96.03	2005	5665 00501>60000	6 Cyl / 3.6L / 235 kW (315 hp)
996 GT3	M96.76	2000	Y63Y 21501>23000	6 Cyl / 3.6L / 265 kW (355 hp)
996 GT3	M96.76	2001	1631 21501>23000	6 Cyl / 3.6L / 265 kW (355 hp)
996 GT3	M96.79	2004	4634 24501>26000	6 Cyl / 3.6L / 280 kW (375 hp)
996 GT3 RS	M96.79	2004	4634 26501>27000	6 Cyl / 3.6L / 280 kW (375 hp)
996 GT3	M96.79	2005	5635 24501>26000	6 Cyl / 3.6L / 280 kW (375 hp)
996 Turbo	M96.70	2001	1641 00501>60000	6 Cyl / 3.6L / 309 kW (414 hp)
996 Turbo GT2	M96.70S	2001	1641 00501>60000	6 Cyl / 3.6L / 340 kW (456 hp)
996 Turbo	M96.70	2002	2642 00501>60000	6 Cyl / 3.6L / 309 kW (414 hp)
996 Turbo GT2	M96.70S	2002	2642 00501>60000	6 Cyl / 3.6L / 340 kW (456 hp)
996 Turbo	M96.70	2003	3643 00501>60000	6 Cyl / 3.6L / 309 kW (414 hp)
996 Turbo GT2	M96.70S	2003	3643 20501>60000	6 Cyl / 3.6L / 340 kW (456 hp)
996 Turbo	M96.70	2004	4644 00501>60000	6 Cyl / 3.6L / 309 kW (414 hp)
996 Turbo GT2	M96.70S	2004	4644 20501>60000	6 Cyl / 3.6L / 340 kW (456 hp)
996 Turbo IX50 kit	M96.70E	2004	4644 30501>40000	6 Cyl / 3.6L / 336 kW (451 hp)
996 Turbo	M96.70	2005	5645 00501>20000	6 Cyl / 3.6L / 309 kW (414 hp)
996 Turbo GT2	M96.70S	2005	5645 20501>30000	6 Cyl / 3.6L / 360 kW (483 hp)
996 Turbo IX50 kit	M96.70E	2005	5645 30501>40000	6 Cyl / 3.6L / 336 kW (451 hp)

==== 997 ====
See Porsche 911 (997)

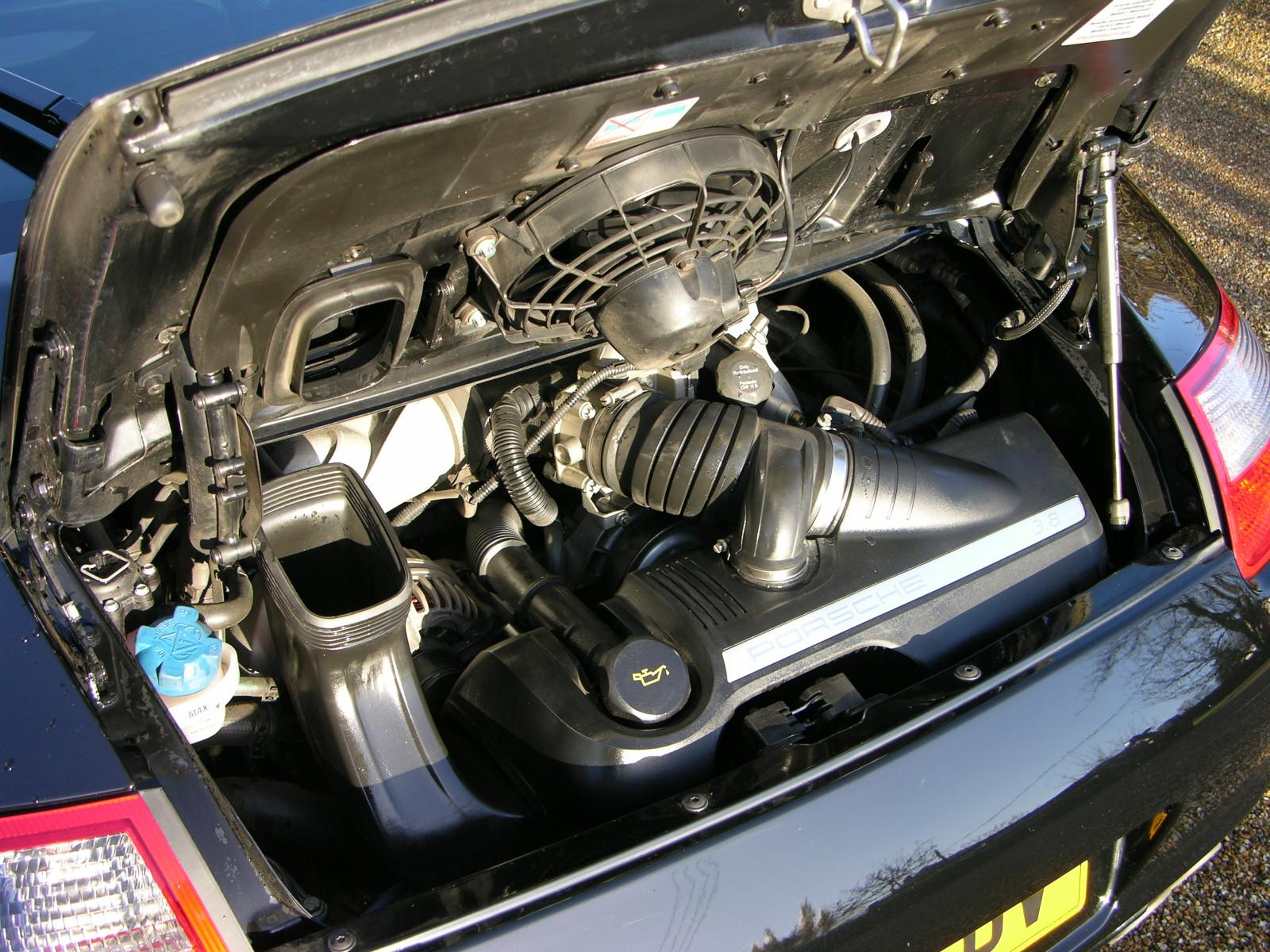
2006 911 Carrera S engine bay

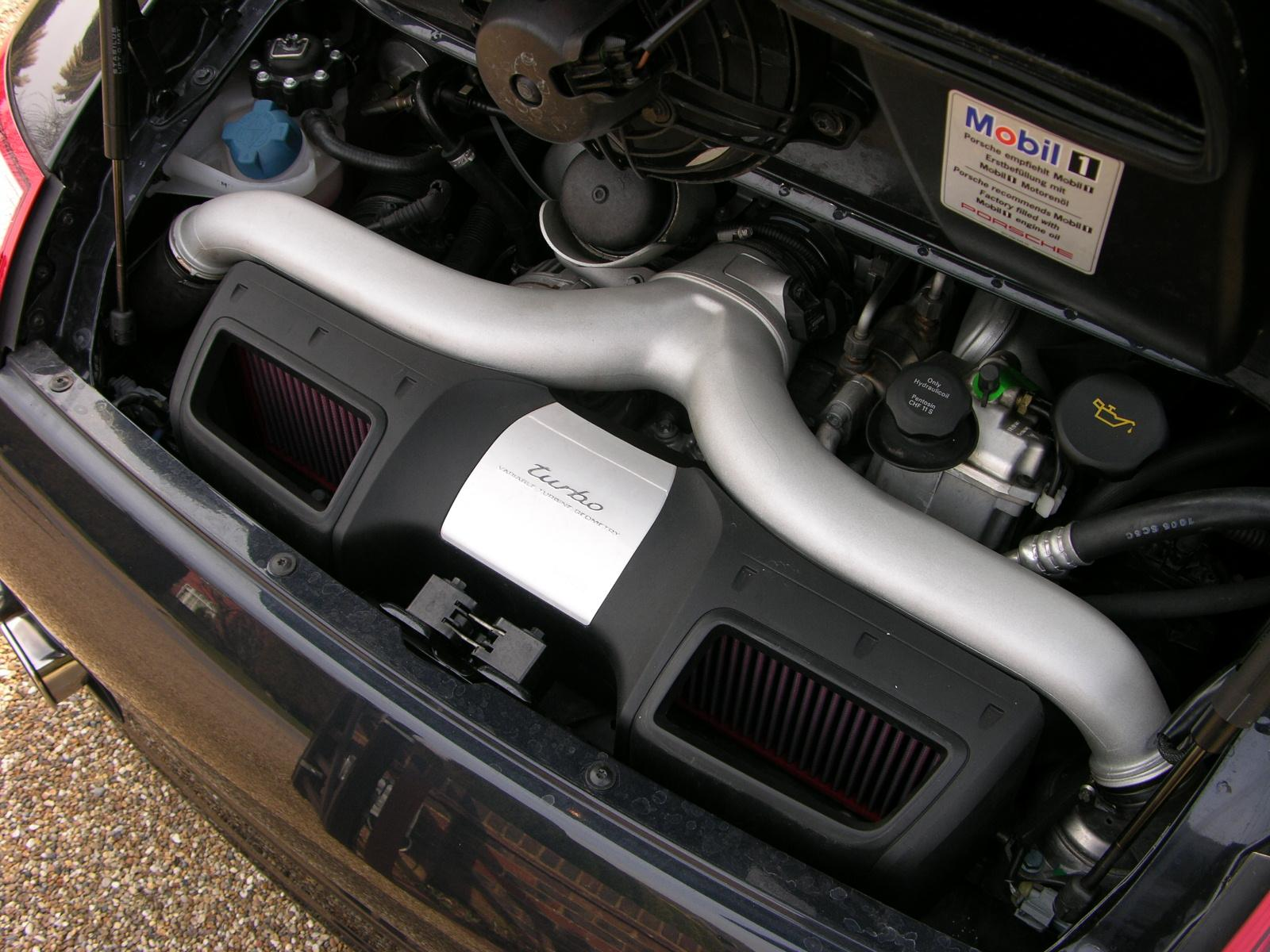
2007 911 Turbo engine bay

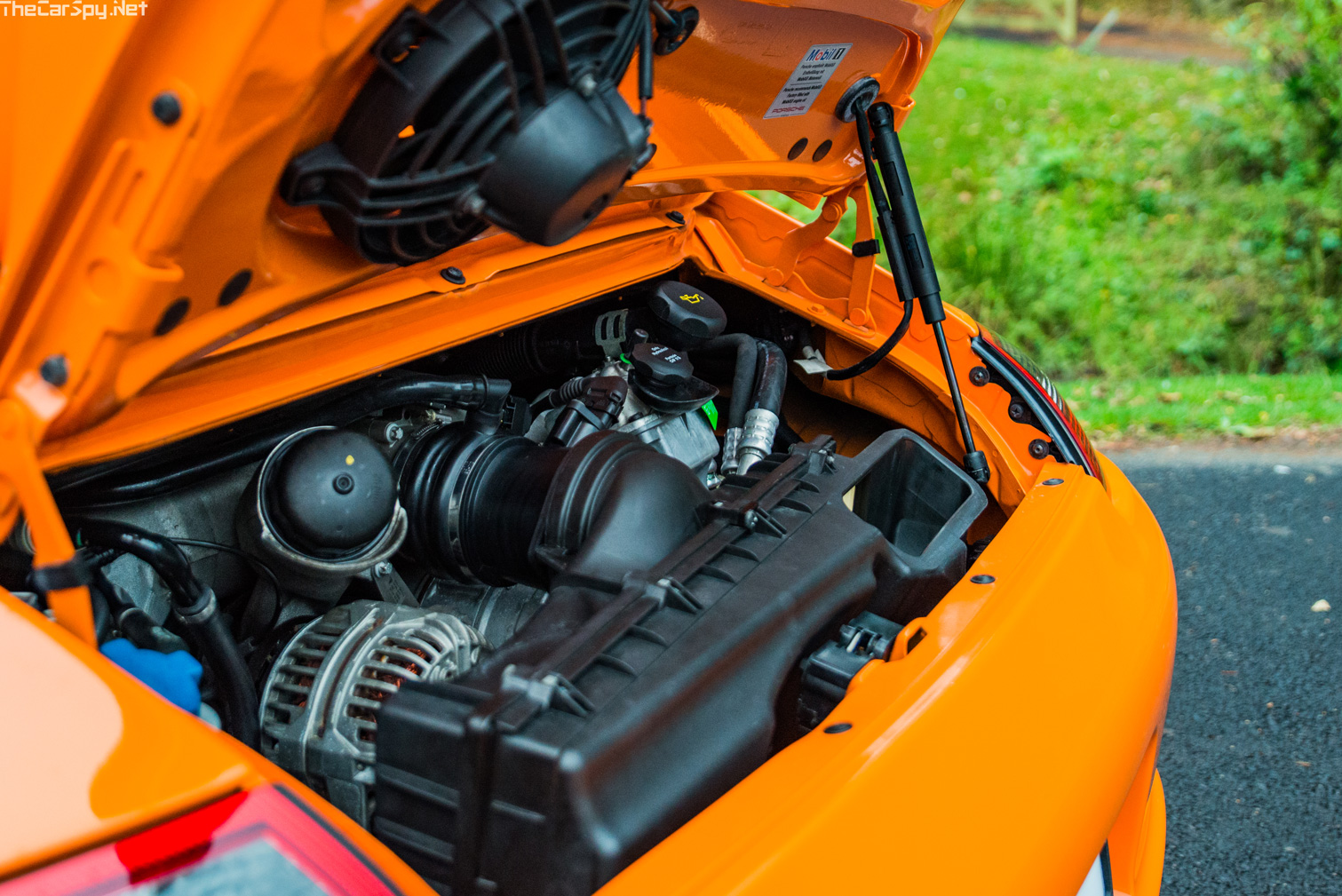
2007 911 GT3 engine bay

- 2006–2008 3.6 L (3,596 cc) 325 PS (239 kW; 321 bhp) 370 N⋅m (273 lb⋅ft) water-cooled DOHC 24-valve boxer flat-six (VarioCam Plus) (Carrera/Targa 4)
- 2006–2008 3.8 L (3,824 cc) 355 PS (261 kW; 350 bhp) 400 N⋅m (295 lb⋅ft) water-cooled DOHC 24-valve boxer flat-six (VarioCam Plus) (Carrera S/Targa 4S)
- 2006–2008 3.8 L (3,824 cc) 381 PS (280 kW; 376 bhp) 415 N⋅m (306 lb⋅ft) water-cooled DOHC 24-valve boxer flat-six (VarioCam Plus) (Carrera S powerkit)
- 2007–2009 3.6 L (3,600 cc) 480 PS (353 kW; 473 bhp) 620 N⋅m (457 lb⋅ft) water-cooled biturbo DOHC 24-valve boxer flat-six (VarioCam Plus) (Turbo)
- 2007–2009 3.6 L (3,600 cc) 415 PS (305 kW; 409 bhp) 405 N⋅m (299 lb⋅ft) water-cooled DOHC 24-valve boxer flat-six (VarioCam) (GT3/GT3 RS)
- 2008–2010 3.6 L (3,600 cc) 530 PS (390 kW; 523 bhp) 680 N⋅m (502 lb⋅ft) water-cooled DOHC 24-valve boxer flat-six (VarioCam Plus) (GT2)
- 2005–2008 3.6 L (3,600 cc) 294 kW (400 PS; 394 bhp) (at 7,000 rpm) 400 N⋅m (295 lb⋅ft) (at 6,500 rpm) water-cooled DOHC 24-valve boxer flat six (911 GT3 Cup)
- 2008–2010 3.6 L (3,600 cc) water-cooled DOHC 24-valve boxer flat six (911 GT3 Cup S)
- 2006–2010 3.8 L (3,800 cc) 335 kW (455 PS; 449 bhp) (at 8,500 rpm) 435 N⋅m (321 lb⋅ft) water-cooled DOHC 24-valve boxer flat six (911 GT3 RSR)

997 II

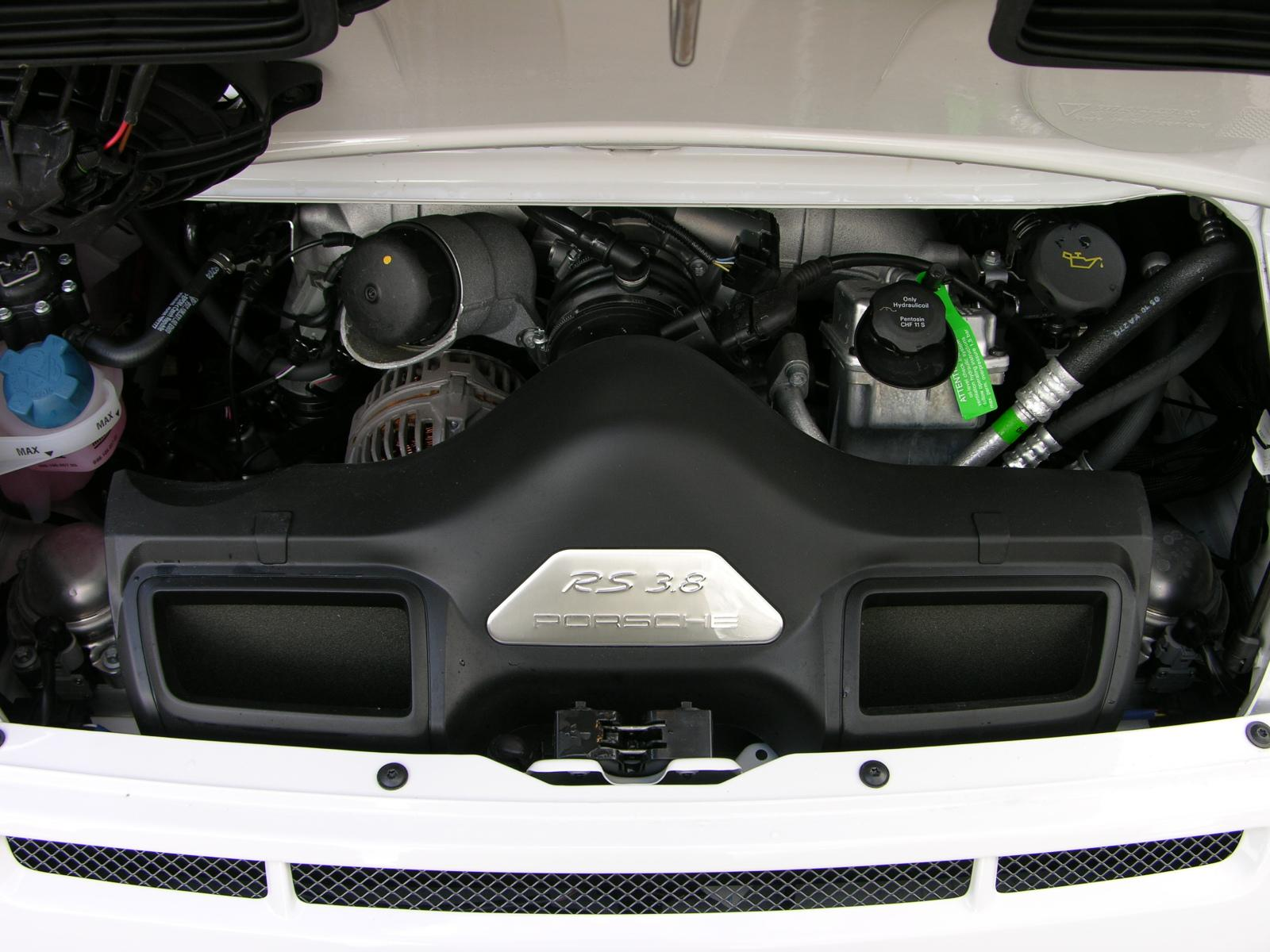
2010 911 GT3 RS engine bay

- 2008–2012 3.6 L (3,614 cc) 345 PS (254 kW; 340 bhp) 390 N⋅m (288 lb⋅ft) water-cooled DOHC 24-valve boxer flat-six (VarioCam Plus, DFI) (Carrera/Targa 4)
- 2008–2012 3.8 L (3,800 cc) 385 PS (283 kW; 380 bhp) 420 N⋅m (310 lb⋅ft) water-cooled DOHC 24-valve boxer flat-six (VarioCam Plus, DFI) (Carrera S/Targa 4S)
- 2009–2012 3.8 L (3,797 cc) 435 PS (320 kW; 429 bhp) 430 N⋅m (317 lb⋅ft) water-cooled DOHC 24-valve boxer flat-six (VarioCam) (GT3)
- 2009–2012 3.8 L (3,797 cc) 450 PS (331 kW; 444 bhp) 430 N⋅m (317 lb⋅ft) water-cooled DOHC 24-valve boxer flat-six (VarioCam) (GT3 RS)
- 2009–2013 3.8 L (3,800 cc) 500 PS (368 kW; 493 bhp) 650 N⋅m (479 lb⋅ft) water-cooled biturbo DOHC 24-valve boxer flat-six (VarioCam) (Turbo)
- 2009–2012 3.8 L (3,800 cc) 408 PS (300 kW; 402 bhp) 420 N⋅m (310 lb⋅ft) water-cooled DOHC 24-valve boxer flat-six (VarioCam) (GTS/Sport Classic/Speedster)
- 2010–2013 3.8 L (3,800 cc) 530 PS (390 kW; 523 bhp) 700 N⋅m (516 lb⋅ft) water-cooled biturbo DOHC 24-valve boxer flat-six (VarioCam Plus) (Turbo S)
- 2010 3.6 L (3,600 cc) 620 PS (456 kW; 612 bhp) 700 N⋅m (516 lb⋅ft) water-cooled biturbo DOHC 24-valve boxer flat-six (VarioCam Plus) (GT2 RS)
- 2011 4.0 L (3,996 cc) 500 PS (368 kW; 493 bhp) 460 N⋅m (339 lb⋅ft) water-cooled DOHC 24-valve boxer flat-six (GT3 RS 4.0)
- 2009–2013 4.0 L (3,996 cc) 331 kW (450 PS; 444 bhp) (at 7,500 rpm) water-cooled DOHC 24-valve boxer flat-six (GT3 Cup 3.8)
- 2011–2013 3.8 L (3,800 cc) 338 kW (460 PS; 453 bhp) water-cooled DOHC 24-valve boxer flat six (911 GT3 RSR)
- 2010–2013 3.8 L (3,800 cc) 368 kW (500 PS; 493 bhp) water-cooled DOHC 24-valve boxer flat six (911 GT3 R)
- 2010–2011 4.0 L (3,996 cc) 373 kW (507 PS; 500 bhp) water-cooled DOHC 24-valve boxer flat six and 163 kW (222 PS; 219 bhp) from two electric motors (911 GT3 R Hybrid)

Porsche 997 engines
Vehicle	Engine	MY	Engine numbers	Technical data
997 Coupe/Cabrio	M96.05	2005	5 695 00501>20000	6 Cyl / 3.6L / 239 kW (321 hp)
997 Coupe S/Cabrio S	M97.01	2005	5 685 00501>60000	6 Cyl / 3.8L / 261 kW (350 hp)
997 Coupe/Cabrio	M96.05	2006	6 696 00501>20000	6 Cyl / 3.6L / 239 kW (321 hp)
997 Coupe S/Cabrio S	M97.01	2006	6 686 00501>60000	6 Cyl / 3.8L / 261 kW (350 hp)
997 Coupe/Cabrio	M96.05	2007	7 697 00501>20000	6 Cyl / 3.6L / 239 kW (321 hp)
997 Coupe S/Cabrio S	M97.01	2007	7 687 00501>40000	6 Cyl / 3.8L / 261 kW (350 hp)
997 Coupe S/Cabrio S kit X51	M97.01S	2007	7 687 40501>60000	6 Cyl / 3.8L / 280 kW (375 hp)
997 Coupe/Cabrio	M96.05	2008	8 698 00501>20000	6 Cyl / 3.6L / 239 kW (321 hp)
997 Coupe S/Cabrio S	M97.01	2008	8 688 00501>40000	6 Cyl / 3.8L / 261 kW (350 hp)
997 Coupe S/Cabrio S kit X51	M97.01S	2008	8 688 40501>60000	6 Cyl / 3.8L / 280 kW (375 hp)
997 Coupe/Cabrio/Targa	MA1.02	2009	9 __9 00501>99999	6 Cyl / 3.6L / 253 kW (339 hp)
997 Coupe S/Cabrio S/Targa S	MA1.01	2009	9 __9 00501>99999	6 Cyl / 3.8L / 283 kW (380 hp)
997 Coupe/Cabrio/Targa	MA1.02	2010	A __A 00501>99999	6 Cyl / 3.6L / 254 kW (341 hp)
997 Coupe S/Cabrio S/Targa S	MA1.01	2010	A __A 00501>99999	6 Cyl / 3.8L / 283 kW (380 hp)
997 Coupe S(Sport Classic)X51	MA1.01	2010	A S_A 00501>60000	6 Cyl / 3.8L / 300 kW (402 hp)
997 Coupe/Cabrio/Targa	MA1.02	2011	B __B 00501>60000	6 Cyl / 3.6L / 254 kW (341 hp)
997 Coupe S/Cabrio S/Targa S	MA1.01	2011	B __B 00501>60000	6 Cyl / 3.8L / 283 kW (380 hp)
997 Coupe S/Cabrio S X51	MA1.01	2011	B S_B 00501>60000	6 Cyl / 3.8L / 300 kW (402 hp)
997 Coupe/Cabrio/Targa	MA1.02	2012	C __C 00501>60000	6 Cyl / 3.6L / 254 kW (341 hp)
997 Coupe S/Cabrio S/Targa S	MA1.01	2012	C __C 00501>60000	6 Cyl / 3.8L / 283 kW (380 hp)
997 Coupe S/Cabrio S X51	MA1.01	2012	C S C 00501>60000	6 Cyl / 3.8L / 300 kW (402 hp)
997 GT3	M97.76	2007	7 617 23501>26000	6 Cyl / 3.6L / 305 kW (409 hp)
997 GT3	M97.76	2008	8 618 23501>26000	6 Cyl / 3.6L / 305 kW (409 hp)
997 GT3	M97.76	2009	9 619 23501>26000	6 Cyl / 3.6L / 305 kW (409 hp)
997 GT3	M97.77	2010	A 61A 23501>26000	6 Cyl / 3.8L / 320 kW (429 hp)
997 GT3	M97.77	2011	B 61B 23501>26000	6 Cyl / 3.8L / 320 kW (429 hp)
997 GT3 RS	M97.77R	2011	B 61B 28501>30000	6 Cyl / 3.8L / 331 kW (444 hp)
997 GT3 RS 4.0	M97.74	2011	B 61B 31501>32000	6 Cyl / 4.0L / 368 kW (493 hp)
997 Turbo	M97.70	2007	7 627 00501>18000	6 Cyl / 3.6L / 353 kW (473 hp)
997 Turbo	M97.70	2008	8 628 00501>18000	6 Cyl / 3.6L / 353 kW (473 hp)
997 Turbo GT2	M97.70S	2008	8 628 20501>28000	6 Cyl / 3.6L / 390 kW (523 hp)
997 Turbo	M97.70	2009	9 629 00501>18000	6 Cyl / 3.6L / 353 kW (473 hp)
997 Turbo +I114	M97.70	2009	9 629 18501>20000	6 Cyl / 3.6L / 353 kW (473 hp)
997 Turbo GT2	M97.70S	2009	9 629 20501>28000	6 Cyl / 3.6L / 390 kW (523 hp)
997 Turbo GT2 +I114	M97.70S	2009	9 629 28501>30000	6 Cyl / 3.6L / 390 kW (523 hp)
997 Turbo	MA1.70	2010	A __A 00501>60000	6 Cyl / 3.8L / 368 kW (493 hp)
997 Turbo	MA1.70	2011	B __B 00501>60000	6 Cyl / 3.8L / 368 kW (493 hp)
997 Turbo S +I092	MA1.70	2011	B S_B 00501>60000	6 Cyl / 3.8L / 390 kW (523 hp)
997 GT2 RS	M97.70	2011	B 62B 30501>40000	6 Cyl / 3.6L / 456 kW (612 hp)
997 Turbo	MA1.70	2012	C __C 00501>60000	6 Cyl / 3.8L / 368 kW (493 hp)
997 Turbo S +I092	MA1.70	2012	C S_C 00501>60000	6 Cyl / 3.8L / 390 kW (523 hp)
997 Turbo	MA1.70	2013	D __D 00501>60000	6 Cyl / 3.8L / 368 kW (493 hp)
997 Turbo S +I092	MA1.70	2013	D S_D 00501>60000	6 Cyl / 3.8L / 390 kW (523 hp)

==== 991 ====
See Porsche 911 (991)

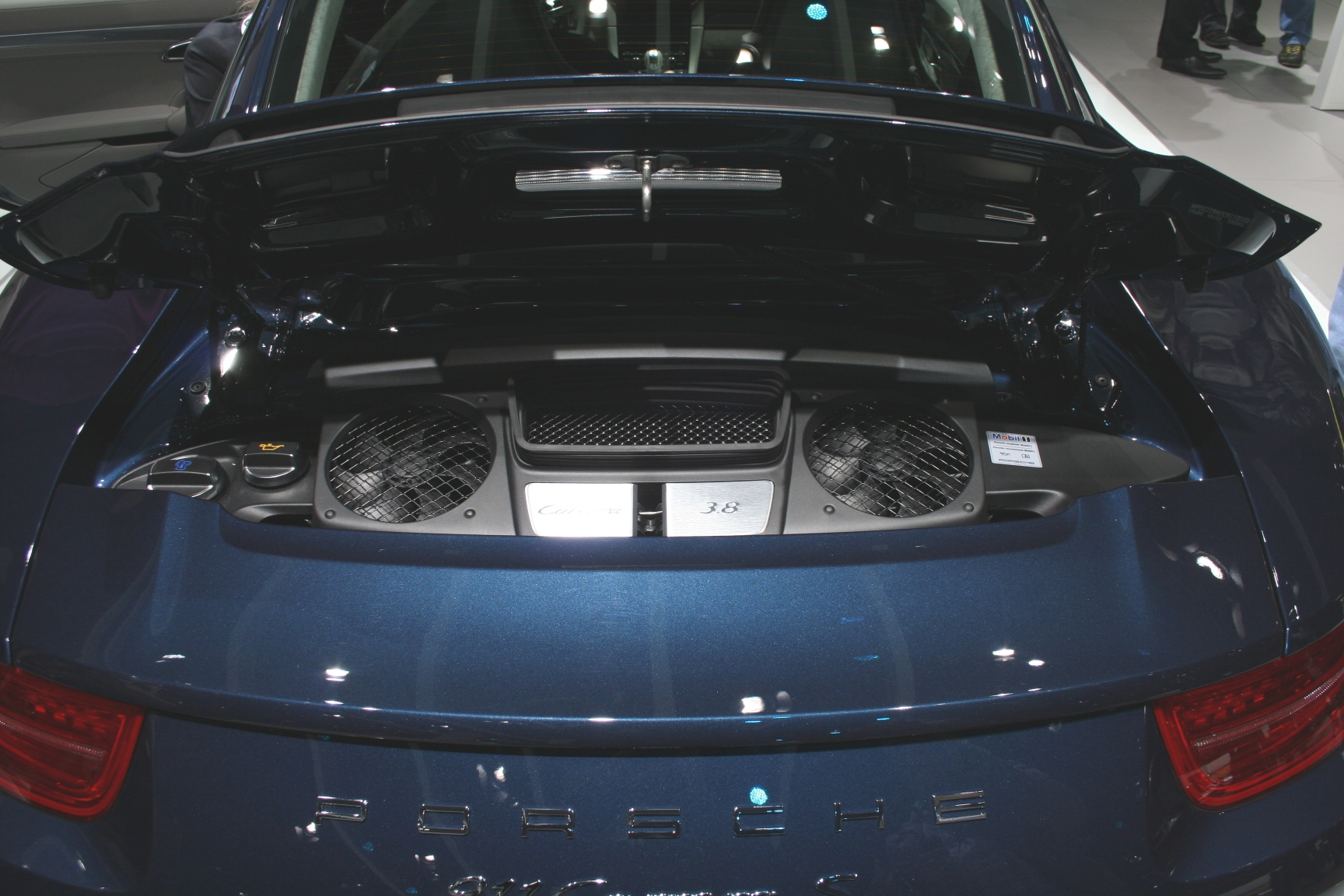
2012 911 Carrera S engine bay

- 2011–2015 3.4 L (3,436 cc) 350 PS (257 kW; 345 bhp) 390 N⋅m (288 lb⋅ft) water-cooled DOHC 24-valve boxer flat-six (VarioCam Plus) (Carrera/Targa 4)
- 2011–2015 3.8 L (3,800 cc) 400 PS (294 kW; 395 bhp) 440 N⋅m (325 lb⋅ft) water-cooled DOHC 24-valve boxer flat-six (VarioCam Plus) (Carrera S/Targa 4S)
- 2011–2015 3.8 L (3,800 cc) 430 PS (316 kW; 424 bhp) 440 N⋅m (325 lb⋅ft) water-cooled DOHC 24-valve boxer flat-six (VarioCam Plus) (Carrera GTS/Targa 4 GTS)
- 2013–2015 3.8 L (3,800 cc) 520 PS (382 kW; 513 bhp) 660 N⋅m (487 lb⋅ft) water-cooled biturbo DOHC 24-valve boxer flat-six (VarioCam Plus) (Turbo)
- 2013–2015 3.8 L (3,800 cc) 560 PS (412 kW; 552 bhp) 700 N⋅m (516 lb⋅ft) water-cooled biturbo DOHC 24-valve boxer flat-six (VarioCam Plus) (Turbo S)
- 2013–2015 3.8 L (3,800 cc) 475 PS (349 kW; 469 bhp) 440 N⋅m (325 lb⋅ft) water-cooled DOHC 24-valve boxer flat-six (VarioCam) (GT3)
- 2015–2016 4.0 L (3,996 cc) 500 PS (368 kW; 493 bhp) 460 N⋅m (339 lb⋅ft) water-cooled DOHC 24-valve boxer flat-six (VarioCam) (GT3 RS, R)
- 2013–2017 3.8 L (3,800 cc) 460 PS (338 kW; 454 bhp) (restricted) water-cooled DOHC 24-valve boxer flat-six (GT3 Cup)
- 2015–2017 4.0 L (3,996 cc) 470 PS (346 kW; 464 bhp) (restricted) water-cooled DOHC 24-valve boxer flat-six (RSR)
- 2015–2018 4.0 L (3,996 cc) 500 PS (368 kW; 493 bhp) (restricted) water-cooled DOHC 24-valve boxer flat-six (GT3 R)

991 II

- 2015–2019 3.0 L (2,981 cc) 370 PS (272 kW; 365 bhp) 450 N⋅m (332 lb⋅ft) water-cooled biturbo DOHC 24-valve boxer flat-six (VarioCam Plus) (Carrera/Targa)
- 2015–2019 3.0 L (2,981 cc) 420 PS (309 kW; 414 bhp) 500 N⋅m (369 lb⋅ft) water-cooled biturbo DOHC 24-valve boxer flat-six (VarioCam Plus) (Carrera S/Targa S)
- 2016–2019 3.8 L (3,800 cc) 540 PS (397 kW; 533 bhp) 660 N⋅m (487 lb⋅ft) water-cooled biturbo DOHC 24-valve boxer flat-six (VarioCam Plus) (Turbo)
- 2016–2019 3.8 L (3,800 cc) 580 PS (427 kW; 572 bhp) 700 N⋅m (516 lb⋅ft) water-cooled biturbo DOHC 24-valve boxer flat-six (VarioCam Plus) (Turbo S)
- 2017–2019 4.0 L (3,996 cc) 500 PS (368 kW; 493 bhp) 460 N⋅m (339 lb⋅ft) water-cooled DOHC 24-valve boxer flat-six (VarioCam) (GT3)
- 2017–2019 3.8 L (3,800 cc) 607 PS (446 kW; 599 bhp) 750 N⋅m (553 lb⋅ft) water-cooled biturbo DOHC 24-valve boxer flat-six (VarioCam Plus) (Turbo S Exclusive)
- 2017–2019 3.8 L (3,800 cc) 700 PS (515 kW; 690 bhp) 750 N⋅m (553 lb⋅ft) water-cooled biturbo DOHC 24-valve boxer flat-six (VarioCam Plus) (GT2 RS)
- 2018–2019 4.0 L (3,996 cc) 520 PS (382 kW; 513 bhp) 470 N⋅m (347 lb⋅ft) water-cooled DOHC 24-valve boxer flat-six (VarioCam) (GT3 RS)
- 2017–present 4.0 L (3,996 cc) 485 PS (357 kW; 478 bhp) (restricted) water-cooled DOHC 24-valve boxer flat-six (GT3 Cup)
- 2017–2019 4.0 L (3,996 cc) 510 PS (375 kW; 503 bhp) (restricted) water-cooled DOHC 24-valve boxer flat-six (RSR)
- 2018–present 4.0 L (3,996 cc) 550 PS (405 kW; 542 bhp) (restricted) water-cooled DOHC 24-valve boxer flat-six (GT3 R)
- 2019–present 4.2 L (4,192 cc) 515 PS (379 kW; 508 bhp) (restricted) water-cooled DOHC 24-valve boxer flat-six (RSR)

Porsche 991 engines
Vehicle	Engine	MY	Engine numbers	Technical data
991 S	MA1.03	2012	C __C 00501>60000	6 Cyl / 3.8L / 294 kW (394 hp)
991	MA1.04	2012	C __C 00501>60000	6 Cyl / 3.4L / 257 kW (345 hp)
991 S	MA1.03	2013	D __D 00501>60000	6 Cyl / 3.8L / 294 kW (394 hp)
991	MA1.04	2013	D __D 00501>60000	6 Cyl / 3.4L / 257 kW (345 hp)
991 S	MA1.03	2014	E __E 00501>60000	6 Cyl / 3.8L / 294 kW (394 hp)
991	MA1.04	2014	E __E 00501>60000	6 Cyl / 3.4L / 257 kW (345 hp)
991 S	MA1.03	2015	F __F 00501>60000	6 Cyl / 3.8L / 294 kW (394 hp)
991	MA1.04	2015	F __F 00501>60000	6 Cyl / 3.4L / 257 kW (345 hp)
991 S	MA1.03	2016	G __G 00501>60000	6 Cyl / 3.8L / 294 kW (394 hp)
991	MA1.04	2016	G __G 00501>60000	6 Cyl / 3.4L / 257 kW (345 hp)
991 S	MAB.03	2017	H __C 00501>60000	6 Cyl / 3.8L / 294 kW (394 hp)
991	MAB.04	2017	H _ C 00501>60000	6 Cyl / 3.4L / 257 kW (345 hp)
991 S HP	MDC.HA	2017	H __C 00501>60000	6 Cyl / 3.0L / 309 kW (414 hp)
991 S HP C33	MDC.H	2017	H __C 00501>60000	6 Cyl / 3.0L / 309 kW (414 hp)
991 S HP	MDC.JA	2017	H __C 00501>60000	6 Cyl / 3.0L / 331 kW (444 hp)
991 LP	MDC.KA	2017	H __C 00501>60000	6 Cyl / 3.0L / 272 kW (365 hp)
991 S HP	MDC.HA	2018	J __C 00501>60000	6 Cyl / 3.0L / 309 kW (414 hp)
991 S HP C33	MDC.H	2018	J __C 00501>60000	6 Cyl / 3.0L / 309 kW (414 hp)
991 S HP	MDC.JA	2018	J __C 00501>60000	6 Cyl / 3.0L / 331 kW (444 hp)
991 S HP C33	MDC.J	2018	J __C 00501>60000	6 Cyl / 3.0L / 331 kW (444 hp)
991 LP	MDC.KA	2018	J __C 00501>60000	6 Cyl / 3.0L / 272 kW (365 hp)
991 LP C33	MDC.K	2018	J __C 00501>60000	6 Cyl / 3.0L / 272 kW (365 hp)
991 GT3	MA1.75	2014	E __E 00501>60000	6 Cyl / 3.8L / 350 kW (469 hp)
991 GT3	MA1.75	2015	F __F 00501>60000	6 Cyl / 3.8L / 350 kW (469 hp)
991 GT3 RS	MA1.76	2015	F __F 00501>60000	6 Cyl / 4.0L / 373 kW (500 hp)
991 GT3	MA1.75	2016	G __G 00501>60000	6 Cyl / 3.8L / 350 kW (469 hp)
991 GT3 RS	MA1.76	2016	G __G 00501>60000	6 Cyl / 4.0L / 368 kW (493 hp)
991 R	MA1.76	2016	G __G 00501>60000	6 Cyl / 4.0L / 373 kW (500 hp)
991 GT3	MA1.75	2017	H __H 00501>60000	6 Cyl / 3.8L / 350 kW (469 hp)
991 GT3 RS	MA1.76	2017	H __H 00501>60000	6 Cyl / 4.0L / 383 kW (514 hp)
991 GT3	MDG.GA	2018	J __J 00501>60000	6 Cyl / 4.0L / 368 kW (493 hp)
991 GT3 C33	MDG.G	2018	J __J 00501>60000	6 Cyl / 4.0L / 368 kW (493 hp)
991 Turbo	MA1.71	2014	E __E 00501>60000	6 Cyl / 3.8L / 383 kW (514 hp)
991 Turbo	MA1.71	2015	F __F 00501>60000	6 Cyl / 3.8L / 383 kW (514 hp)
991 Turbo	MA1.71	2016	G __G 00501>60000	6 Cyl / 3.8L / 383 kW (514 hp)
991 II Turbo	MDA.BA	2017	H __H 00501>60000	6 Cyl / 3.8L / 397 kW (532 hp)
991 II Turbo S	MDB.CA	2017	H __H 00501>60000	6 Cyl / 3.8L / 426 kW (571 hp)
991 II Turbo	MDA.BA	2018	J __J 00501>60000	6 Cyl / 3.8L / 397 kW (532 hp)
991 II Turbo C33	MDA.B	2018	J __J 00501>60000	6 Cyl / 3.8L / 397 kW (532 hp)
991 II Turbo S	MDB.CA	2018	J __J 00501>60000	6 Cyl / 3.8L / 426 kW (571 hp)
991 II Turbo S C33	MDB.C	2018	J __J 00501>60000	6 Cyl / 3.8L / 426 kW (571 hp)
991 II GT2 RS	MDH.NA	2018	J __J 00501>60000	6 Cyl / 3.8L / 515 kW (691 hp)
991 II Turbo S Exclusive	MDB.CB	2018	J __J 00501>60000	6 Cyl / 3.8L / 446 kW (598 hp)

==== 992 ====
See Porsche 911 (992)

- 2019–present 3.0 L (2,981 cc) 385 PS (283 kW; 380 bhp) (at 6,500 rpm) 450 N⋅m (332 lb⋅ft) (at 1,950–5,000 rpm) water-cooled biturbo DOHC 24-valve boxer flat-six (VarioCam Plus) (Carrera)
- 2019–present 3.0 L (2,981 cc) 450 PS (331 kW; 444 bhp) (at 6,500 rpm) 530 N⋅m (391 lb⋅ft) (at 2,300–5,000 rpm) water-cooled biturbo DOHC 24-valve boxer flat-six (VarioCam Plus) (Carrera S)
- 2020–present 3.7 L (3,745 cc) 650 PS (478 kW; 641 bhp) (at 6,750 rpm) 800 N⋅m (590 lb⋅ft) (at 2,500–4,000 rpm) water-cooled biturbo DOHC 24-valve boxer flat-six (VarioCam Plus) (Turbo S)
- 2024–present 3.6 L (3,591 cc) 549 PS (404 kW; 541 bhp) (at 6,750 rpm) 569 N⋅m (420 lb⋅ft) (at 2,500–4,000 rpm) water-cooled turbo DOHC 24-valve boxer flat-six (VarioCam Plus) + Electric motor (GTS T-Hybrid)

=== Porsche 911 GT1 (9R1) ===
- 1996 3.2 L (3,200 cc) 440 kW (598 PS; 590 bhp) 600 N⋅m (443 lbf⋅ft) water-cooled biturbo DOHC 24-valve boxer flat-six
- 1997 3.2 L (3,164 cc) 400 kW (544 PS; 536 bhp) 600 N⋅m (443 lbf⋅ft) water-cooled biturbo DOHC 24-valve boxer flat-six (911 GT1 Evo, 911 GT1 Straßenversion, 911 GT1 Evo Straßenversion)
- 1998 3.2 L (3,220 cc) 404 kW (549 PS; 542 bhp) 630 N⋅m (465 lbf⋅ft) water-cooled biturbo DOHC 24-valve boxer flat-six (911 GT1-98, 911 GT1-98 Straßenversion)

=== Porsche 912 ===
- 1965–1969 1.6 L (1,582 cc) 66 kW (90 PS; 89 bhp) 121.6 N⋅m (90 lbf⋅ft) air-cooled, four-stroke, boxer flat-four (912 Coupé, 912 Targa)
- 1976 2.0 L (1,971 cc) 66 kW (90 PS; 89 bhp) air-cooled, four-stroke, boxer flat-four (912E)

Porsche 912 engines
Vehicle	Engine	MY	Engine numbers	Technical data
912 Coupe	616/36	1966	740001>	4 Cyl / 1.6L / 66 kW (89 hp)
912 Coupe/Karmann	616/36	1966	830001>	4 Cyl / 1.6L / 66 kW (89 hp)
912 Coupe	616/36	1967	750001>	4 Cyl / 1.6L / 66 kW (89 hp)
912 Coupe/Targa/Karmann	616/36	1967	836001>	4 Cyl / 1.6L / 66 kW (89 hp)
912 Coupe/Targa/Karmann	616/36	1968	1080001>	4 Cyl / 1.6L / 66 kW (89 hp)
912 Coupe/Targa/Karmann (USA)(CDN)	616/39	1968	1280001>	4 Cyl / 1.6L / 66 kW (89 hp)
912 Coupe/Targa/Karmann	616/36	1969	4090001>	4 Cyl / 1.6L / 66 kW (89 hp)
912 Coupe/Targa (USA)(CDN)	616/40	1969	4093001>	4 Cyl / 1.6L / 66 kW (89 hp)
912E Coupe	923.02	1976	6 406 0001>>	4 Cyl / 2.0L / 66 kW (89 hp)

=== Porsche 914 ===
914/4

- 1969–1972 1.7 L (1,679 cc) 59 kW (80 PS; 79 bhp) air-cooled, four-stroke flat-four
- 1974–1975 1.8 L (1,795 cc) 63 kW (86 PS; 84 bhp) air-cooled, four-stroke flat-four
- 1973–1976 2.0 L (1,971 cc) 74 kW (101 PS; 99 bhp) air-cooled, four-stroke flat-four

Porsche 914 engines
Vehicle	Engine	MY	Engine numbers	Technical data
914	022	1970	0 W0 000 001 >>	4 Cyl / 1.7L / 59 kW (79 hp)
914	022	1971	1 W 057461 >>	4 Cyl / 1.7L / 59 kW (79 hp)
914	022	1972	2 W0 129 582 >>	4 Cyl / 1.7L / 59 kW (79 hp)
914	022	1972	2 EA0 000 001>>	4 Cyl / 1.7L / 59 kW (79 hp)
914	022	1973	3 W0 170 001 >>	4 Cyl / 1.7L / 59 kW (79 hp)
914 (USA)	022	1973	3 EA0 057001 >>	4 Cyl / 1.7L / 59 kW (79 hp)
914 (CAL)	022	1973	3 EB0 000 001>>	4 Cyl / 1.7L / 53 kW (71 hp)
914-2.0 (USA)	039	1973	3 GA0 000 001>>	4 Cyl / 2.0L / 70 kW (94 hp)
914-2.0	039	1973	3 GB0 000 001>>	4 Cyl / 2.0L / 74 kW (99 hp)
914-1.8V	021	1974	4 AN0 000 001>>	4 Cyl / 1.8L / 63 kW (84 hp)
914-1.8 (USA)(CAL)	022	1974	4 EC0 000 001>>	4 Cyl / 1.8L / 56 kW (75 hp)
914-2.0 (USA)	039	1974	4 GA0 006 766>>	4 Cyl / 2.0L / 70 kW (94 hp)
914-2.0	039	1974	4 GB0 007 402>>	4 Cyl / 2.0L / 74 kW (99 hp)
914-1.8V	021	1975	5 AN0 008 798>>	4 Cyl / 1.8L / 63 kW (84 hp)
914-1.8 (USA)(CAL)	022	1975	5 EC0 037 552>>	4 Cyl / 1.8L / 56 kW (75 hp)
914-2.0	039	1975	5 GB0 009 822>>	4 Cyl / 2.0L / 74 kW (99 hp)
914-2.0 (USA)(CAL)	039	1975	5 GC0 000 001>>	4 Cyl / 2.0L / 65 kW (87 hp)
914-1.8V	021	1976	6 AN0 008 899>>	4 Cyl / 1.8L / 63 kW (84 hp)
914-1.8 (USA)(CAL)	022	1976	6 EC0 045 073>>	4 Cyl / 1.8L / 56 kW (75 hp)
914-2.0	039	1976	6 GB0 010 779>>	4 Cyl / 2.0L / 74 kW (99 hp)
914-2.0	039	1976	6 GC0 002 915>>	4 Cyl / 2.0L / 65 kW (87 hp)

914/6, 916

- 1970–1972 2.0 L (1,991 cc) 81 kW (110 PS; 109 bhp) air-cooled, four-stroke flat-six (2.0)
- 1970–1972 2.0 L (1,991 cc) 140 kW (190 PS; 188 bhp) air-cooled, four-stroke flat-six (914/6 R, 914/6 GT)
- 1970–1972 2.3 L (2,341 cc) 140 kW (190 PS; 188 bhp) air-cooled, four-stroke flat-six (916) (2.4)
- 1970–1972 2.7 L (2,687 cc) 154 kW (209 PS; 207 bhp) air-cooled, four-stroke flat-six (916) (2.7)

Porsche 914/6, 916 engines
Vehicle	Engine	MY	Engine numbers	Technical data
914-6	901.36	1970	0 640 0001 >>	6 Cyl / 2.0L / 81 kW (109 hp)
914-6 SPM	901.37	1970	0 640 3001 >>	6 Cyl / 2.0L / 81 kW (109 hp)
914-6 (USA)	901.38	1970	0 640 4001 >>	6 Cyl / 2.0L / 81 kW (109 hp)
914-6 (USA) SPM	901.39	1970	0 640 7001 >>	6 Cyl / 2.0L / 81 kW (109 hp)
914-6	901.36	1971	1 641 0001 >>	6 Cyl / 2.0L / 81 kW (109 hp)
914-6 SPM	901.37	1971	1 641 3001 >>	6 Cyl / 2.0L / 81 kW (109 hp)
914-6 (USA)	901.38	1971	1 641 4001 >>	6 Cyl / 2.0L / 81 kW (109 hp)
914-6 (USA) SPM	901.39	1971	1 641 7001 >>	6 Cyl / 2.0L / 81 kW (109 hp)
914-6 (USA)	901.38	1972	2 642 0001 >>	6 Cyl / 2.0L / 81 kW (109 hp)

914/8 prototypes

- 1969 2.9 L (2,926 cc) 192 kW (261 PS; 257 bhp) Type 908 air-cooled, four-stroke flat-eight
- 1969 2.9 L (2,926 cc) 220 kW (299 PS; 295 bhp) Type 908 air-cooled, four-stroke flat-eight

=== Porsche 917 ===
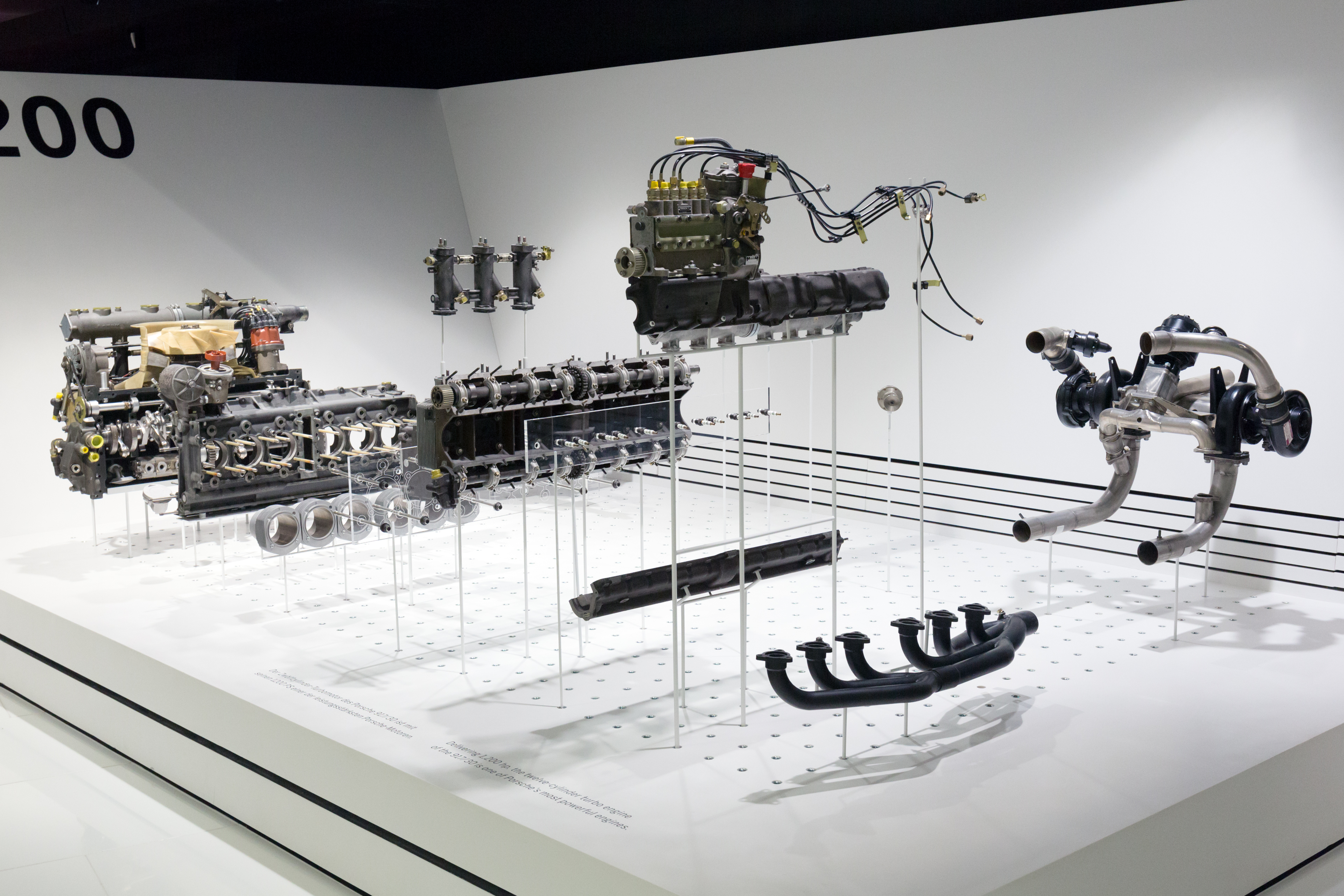
917/30: Type 912 180° V12

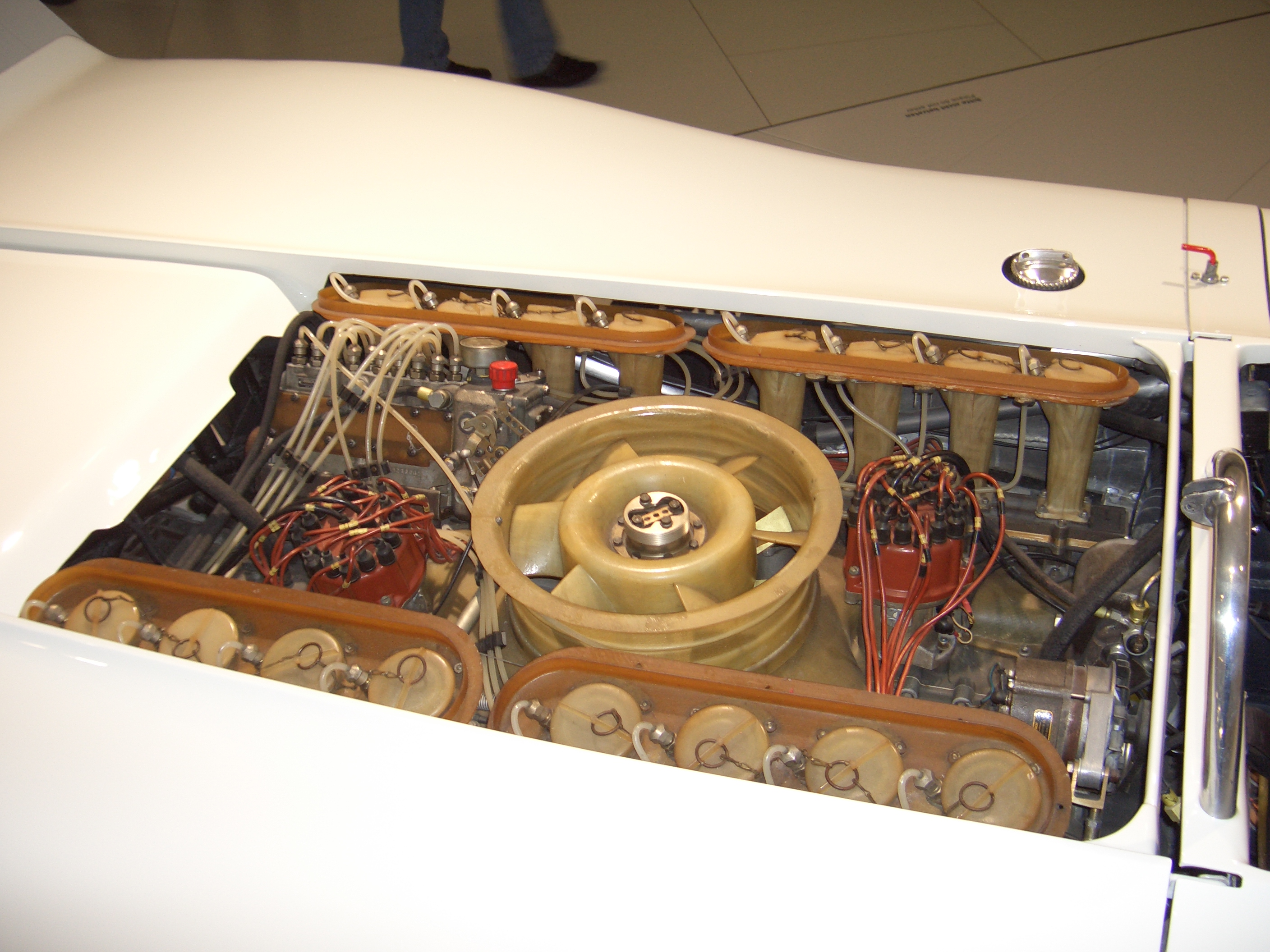
917/16 Spyder: V16

- 1969 4.5 L (4,494 cc) 383 kW (521 PS; 514 bhp) 460 N⋅m (339 lbf⋅ft) Type 912 air-cooled, four-stroke 180° V12 (917 Langheck, 917 Kurzheck)
- 1970 5.0 L (4,999 cc) 442 kW (601 PS; 593 bhp) 549 N⋅m (405 lbf⋅ft) Type 912 air-cooled, four-stroke 180° V12 (917 Langheck, 917 Kurzheck, 917 Spyder, 917/20)
- 1971 5.0 L (4,999 cc) 463 kW (630 PS; 621 bhp) 588 N⋅m (434 lbf⋅ft) Type 912 air-cooled, four-stroke 180° V12 (917 Langheck, 917 Kurzheck)
- 1971 6.6 L (6,643 cc) 551 kW (749 PS; 739 bhp) 735 N⋅m (542 lbf⋅ft) air-cooled, four-stroke 180° V16 (917/16 Spyder prototype)
- 1971 4.5 L (4,494 cc) 626 kW (851 PS; 839 bhp) 834 N⋅m (615 lbf⋅ft) Type 912 air-cooled, four-stroke, turbo 180° V12 (917/10 TC)
- 1972 5.0 L (4,999 cc) 736 kW (1,001 PS; 987 bhp) 981 N⋅m (724 lbf⋅ft) Type 912 air-cooled, four-stroke, turbo 180° V12 (917/10 TC)
- 1973 5.4 L (5,374 cc) 810 kW (1,101 PS; 1,086 bhp) 1,098 N⋅m (810 lbf⋅ft) Type 912 air-cooled, four-stroke, turbo 180° V12 (917/30)

=== Porsche 918 ===
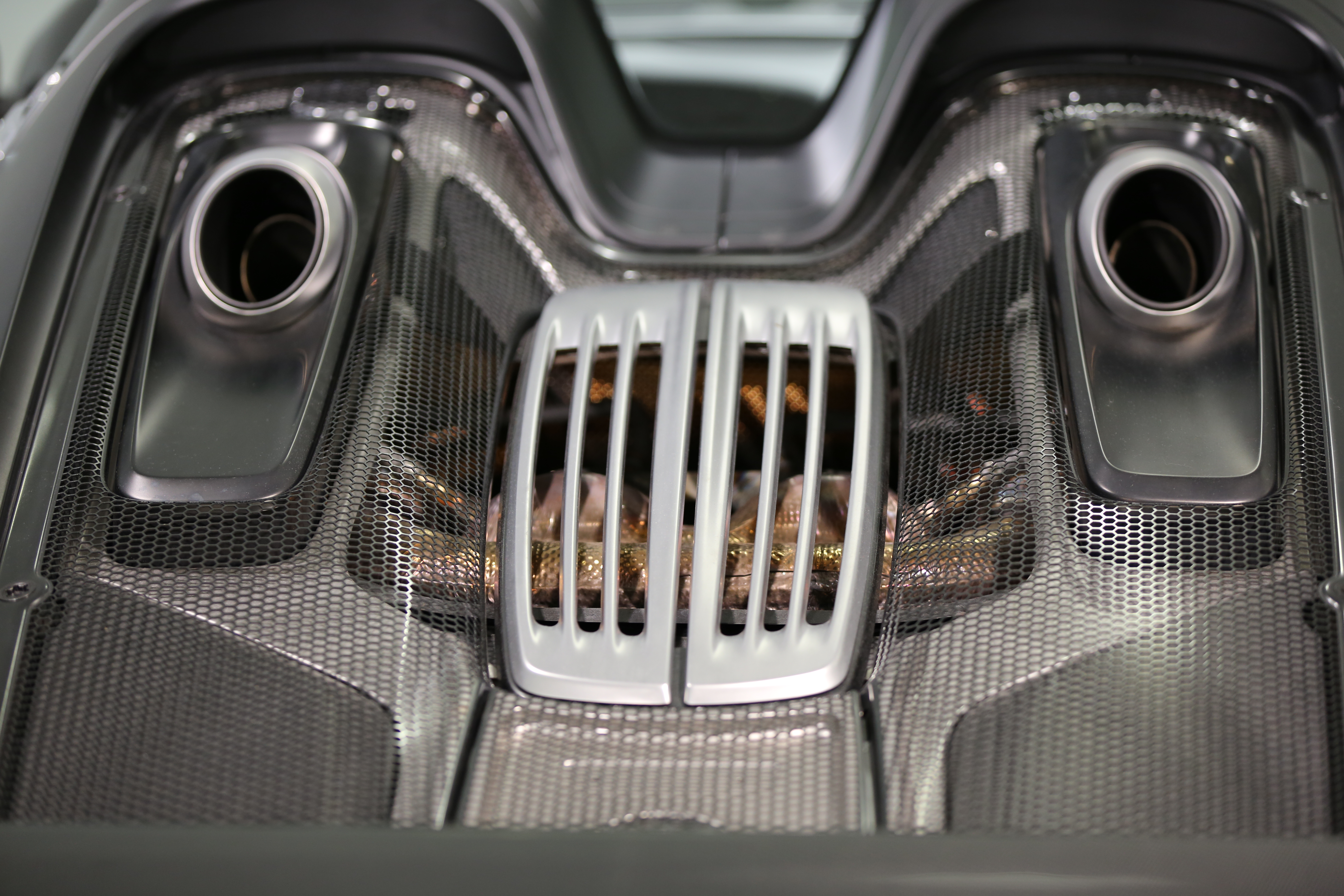
918 Spyder engine deck

- 2013–2015 4.6 L (4,593 cc) 447 kW (608 PS; 599 bhp) V8 (derived from the 3.4 L (3,397 cc) MR6 V8 of the Porsche RS Spyder)

=== Porsche 919 Hybrid (9R9) ===
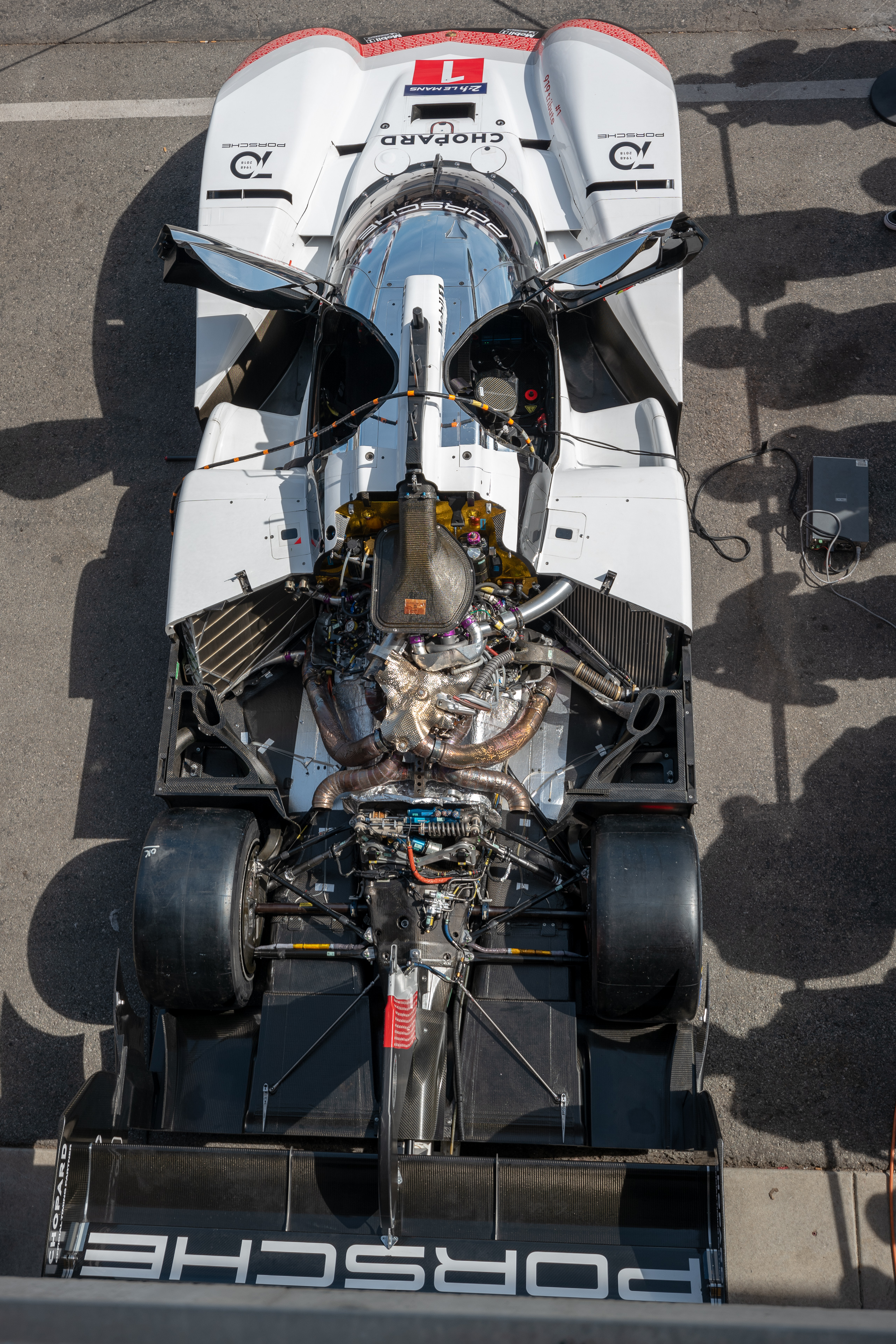
919 Evo: 2.0L V4 turbo hybrid

- 2014 2.0 L (2,000 cc) 370 kW (503 PS; 496 bhp) turbo-charged V4 plus 184 kW (250 PS; 247 bhp) electric motor
- 2015–2017 2.0 L (2,000 cc) 370 kW (503 PS; 496 bhp) turbo-charged V4 plus 294 kW (400 PS; 394 bhp) electric motor
- 2018 2.0 L (2,000 cc) 535 kW (727 PS; 717 bhp) turbo-charged V4 plus 328 kW (446 PS; 440 bhp) electric motor (919 Evo)

=== Porsche 924 (924/931/932/937/938/939/946/947) ===
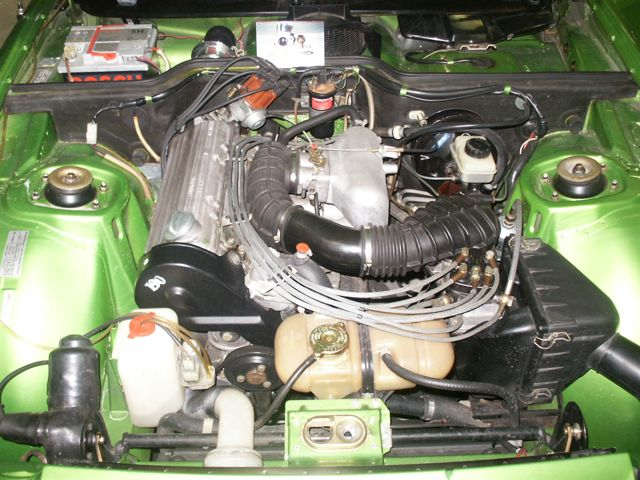
1976 924 engine bay

924

- 1976–1985 2.0 L (1,984 cc) 92 kW (125 PS; 123 bhp) (at 5800 rpm) 165 N⋅m (122 lb⋅ft) (at 3500 rpm) SOHC inline-four-cylinder

924 Turbo (931/932)

- 1978–1981 2.0 L (1,984 cc) 125 kW (170 PS; 168 bhp) (at 5500 rpm) 245 N⋅m (181 lb⋅ft) (at 3500 rpm) water-cooled SOHC turbo inline-four-cylinder
- 1981–1984 2.0 L (1,984 cc) 130 kW (177 PS; 174 bhp) (at 5500 rpm) 250 N⋅m (184 lb⋅ft) (at 3500 rpm) water-cooled SOHC turbo inline-four-cylinder

924 Carrera GT/Carrera GTS/Carrera GTS Clubsport (937/938)

- 1981–1984 2.0 L (1,984 cc) 154 kW (209 PS; 207 bhp) (at 6000 rpm) 250 N⋅m (184 lb⋅ft) (at 3500 rpm) M31/70 SOHC turbo inline-four-cylinder (Carrera GTS)
- 1981 2.0 L (1,984 cc) 180 kW (245 PS; 241 bhp) (at 6250 rpm) 335 N⋅m (247 lb⋅ft) (at 3000 rpm) M31/70 SOHC turbo inline-four-cylinder (Carrera GTS)
- 1981 2.0 L (1,984 cc) 199 kW (271 PS; 267 bhp) (at 6500 rpm) 335 N⋅m (247 lb⋅ft) (at 5500 rpm) M31/70 SOHC turbo inline-four-cylinder (Carrera GTS Clubsport)

924 Carrera GTP/Carrera GTP Le Mans/Carrera GTR (939)

- 1980 2.0 L (1,984 cc) 235 kW (320 PS; 315 bhp) (at 7000 rpm) 383 N⋅m (282 lb⋅ft) (at 4500 rpm) M31/70 SOHC turbo inline-four-cylinder (Carrera GTP)
- 1981 2.0 L (1,984 cc) 276 kW (375 PS; 370 bhp) (at 6500 rpm) 405 N⋅m (299 lb⋅ft) (at 5600 rpm) M31/70 SOHC turbo inline-four-cylinder (Carrera GTR)
- 1981 2.5 L (2,479 cc) 301 kW (409 PS; 404 bhp) (at 6500 rpm) DOHC turbo inline-four-cylinder (Carrera GTP Le Mans)

924S (946/947)

- 1986–1987 2.5 L (2,479 cc) 110 kW (150 PS; 148 bhp) (at 5800 rpm) 190 N⋅m (140 lb⋅ft) (at 3000 rpm) SOHC inline-four-cylinder
- 1988 2.5 L (2,479 cc) 118 kW (160 PS; 158 bhp) (at 5900 rpm) 210 N⋅m (155 lb⋅ft) (at 4500 rpm) SOHC inline-four-cylinder

Porsche 924 engines
Vehicle	Engine	MY	Engine numbers	Technical data
924	047.8	1976	6 XK 000001>>	4 Cyl / 2.0L / 92 kW (123 hp)
924	047.8	1977	7 XK 000001>>	4 Cyl / 2.0L / 92 kW (123 hp)
924 M249	047.9	1977	7 XK 000001>>	4 Cyl / 2.0L / 92 kW (123 hp)
924 (GB)(AUS)	047.8	1977	7 XJ 000001>>	4 Cyl / 2.0L / 92 kW (123 hp)
924 M249 (GB)(AUS)	047.9	1977	7 XJ 000001>>	4 Cyl / 2.0L / 92 kW (123 hp)
924 (USA)(CDN)	047.6	1977	7 XH 000001>>	4 Cyl / 2.0L / 74 kW (99 hp)
924 (USA)(CDN)	047.4	1977	7 XG 300001>>	4 Cyl / 2.0L / 85 kW (114 hp)
924 M249 (USA)(CDN)	047.5	1977	7 XG 300001>>	4 Cyl / 2.0L / 85 kW (114 hp)
924 (CAL)(J)	047.6	1977	7 XF 000001>>	4 Cyl / 2.0L / 74 kW (99 hp)
924 (CAL)	047.4	1977	7 XE 100050>>	4 Cyl / 2.0L / 85 kW (114 hp)
924 M249 (CAL)	047.5	1977	7 XE 100050>>	4 Cyl / 2.0L / 85 kW (114 hp)
924 (J)	047.4	1977	7 XG 300050>>	4 Cyl / 2.0L / 85 kW (114 hp)
924 M249 (J)	047.5	1977	7 XG 300050>>	4 Cyl / 2.0L / 85 kW (114 hp)
924	047.8	1978	8 XK 000001>>	4 Cyl / 2.0L / 92 kW (123 hp)
924	047.8	1978	8 XJ 000001>>	4 Cyl / 2.0L / 92 kW (123 hp)
924 M249	047.9	1978	8 XK 000001>>	4 Cyl / 2.0L / 92 kW (123 hp)
924 M249	047.9	1978	8 XJ 000001>>	4 Cyl / 2.0L / 92 kW (123 hp)
924 (USA)(CDN)(J)	047.4	1978	8 XG 000001>>	4 Cyl / 2.0L / 85 kW (114 hp)
924 M249 (USA)(CDN)(J)	047.5	1978	8 XG 000001>>	4 Cyl / 2.0L / 85 kW (114 hp)
924 (CAL)	047.4	1978	8 XE 000001>>	4 Cyl / 2.0L / 85 kW (114 hp)
924 M249 (CAL)	047.5	1978	8 XE 000001>>	4 Cyl / 2.0L / 85 kW (114 hp)
924	047.8	1979	9 XK 000001>>	4 Cyl / 2.0L / 92 kW (123 hp)
924	047.8	1979	9 XJ 000001>>	4 Cyl / 2.0L / 92 kW (123 hp)
924 M249	047.9	1979	9 XK 000001>>	4 Cyl / 2.0L / 92 kW (123 hp)
924 M249	047.9	1979	9 XJ 000001>>	4 Cyl / 2.0L / 92 kW (123 hp)
924 (USA)(CDN)(J)	047.4	1979	9 XG 000001>>	4 Cyl / 2.0L / 85 kW (114 hp)
924 M249 (USA)(CDN)(J)	047.5	1979	9 XG 000001>>	4 Cyl / 2.0L / 85 kW (114 hp)
924 (CAL)	047.4	1979	9 XE 000001>>	4 Cyl / 2.0L / 85 kW (114 hp)
924 M249 (CAL)	047.5	1979	9 XE 000001>>	4 Cyl / 2.0L / 85 kW (114 hp)
924 Turbo	M31.01	1979	9 31 010001>>	4 Cyl / 2.0L / 125 kW (168 hp)
924	047.8	1980	A XK.......	4 Cyl / 2.0L / 92 kW (123 hp)
924	047.8	1980	A XJ.......	4 Cyl / 2.0L / 92 kW (123 hp)
924 M249	047.9	1980	A XK.......	4 Cyl / 2.0L / 92 kW (123 hp)
924 M249	047.9	1980	A XJ.......	4 Cyl / 2.0L / 92 kW (123 hp)
924 Turbo	M31.01	1980	A 00001>09999	4 Cyl / 2.0L / 125 kW (168 hp)
924 (USA)(CDN)(J)	047E	1980	A VC.......	4 Cyl / 2.0L / 85 kW (114 hp)
924 M249 (USA)(CDN)(J)	047F	1980	A VC.......	4 Cyl / 2.0L / 85 kW (114 hp)
924 Turbo (USA)(CDN)(J)	M31.02	1980	A 00001>09999	4 Cyl / 2.0L / 110 kW (148 hp)
924	047.8	1981	B XK.......	4 Cyl / 2.0L / 92 kW (123 hp)
924	047.8	1981	B XJ.......	4 Cyl / 2.0L / 92 kW (123 hp)
924 M249	047.9	1981	B XK.......	4 Cyl / 2.0L / 92 kW (123 hp)
924 M249	047.9	1981	B XJ.......	4 Cyl / 2.0L / 92 kW (123 hp)
924 Turbo	M31.03	1981	B 00001>09999	4 Cyl / 2.0L / 130 kW (174 hp)
924 Carrera GT	M31.50	1981	B 00001>09999	4 Cyl / 2.0L / 154 kW (207 hp)
924 (USA)(CDN)(J)	047.E	1981	B VC.......	4 Cyl / 2.0L / 85 kW (114 hp)
924 M249 (USA)(CDN)(J)	047.F	1981	B VC.......	4 Cyl / 2.0L / 85 kW (114 hp)
924 Turbo (USA)(CDN)(J)	M31.04	1981	B 00001>09999	4 Cyl / 2.0L / 115 kW (154 hp)
924	047.8	1982	C XK.......	4 Cyl / 2.0L / 92 kW (123 hp)
924	047.8	1982	C XJ.......	4 Cyl / 2.0L / 92 kW (123 hp)
924 M249	047.9	1982	C XK.......	4 Cyl / 2.0L / 92 kW (123 hp)
924 M249	047.9	1982	C XJ.......	4 Cyl / 2.0L / 92 kW (123 hp)
924 Turbo	M31.03	1982	C 00001>09999	4 Cyl / 2.0L / 130 kW (174 hp)
924 (USA)(CDN)(J)	047.E	1982	C VC.......	4 Cyl / 2.0L / 85 kW (114 hp)
924 (USA)(CDN)(J)	047.F	1982	C VC.......	4 Cyl / 2.0L / 85 kW (114 hp)
924 Turbo (USA)(CDN)(J)	M31.04	1982	C 00001>09999	4 Cyl / 2.0L / 115 kW (154 hp)
924	047.8	1983	D XK.......	4 Cyl / 2.0L / 92 kW (123 hp)
924	047.8	1983	D XJ.......	4 Cyl / 2.0L / 92 kW (123 hp)
924 M249	047.9	1983	D XJ.......	4 Cyl / 2.0L / 92 kW (123 hp)
924 Turbo (I)	M31.03	1983	D 00001>09999	4 Cyl / 2.0L / 130 kW (174 hp)
924	047.8	1984	E XK.......	4 Cyl / 2.0L / 92 kW (123 hp)
924	047.8	1984	E XJ.......	4 Cyl / 2.0L / 92 kW (123 hp)
924 M249	047.9	1984	E XJ.......	4 Cyl / 2.0L / 92 kW (123 hp)
924 Turbo (I)	M31.03	1984	E 00001>09999	4 Cyl / 2.0L / 130 kW (174 hp)
924	047.8	1985	F XK.......	4 Cyl / 2.0L / 92 kW (123 hp)
924	047.8	1985	F XJ.......	4 Cyl / 2.0L / 92 kW (123 hp)
924 M249	047.9	1985	F XJ.......	4 Cyl / 2.0L / 92 kW (123 hp)
924 S	M44.07	1986	G 43G 00001>60000	4 Cyl / 2.5L / 110 kW (148 hp)
924 S	M44.08	1986	G 43G 60001>90000	4 Cyl / 2.5L / 110 kW (148 hp)
924 S	M44.07	1987	H 43H 00001>60000	4 Cyl / 2.5L / 110 kW (148 hp)
924 S	M44.08	1987	H 43H 60001>90000	4 Cyl / 2.5L / 110 kW (148 hp)
924 S	M44.09	1988	J 46J 00001>60000	4 Cyl / 2.5L / 118 kW (158 hp)
924 S	M44.10	1988	J 46J 60001>70000	4 Cyl / 2.5L / 118 kW (158 hp)

=== Porsche 928 ===
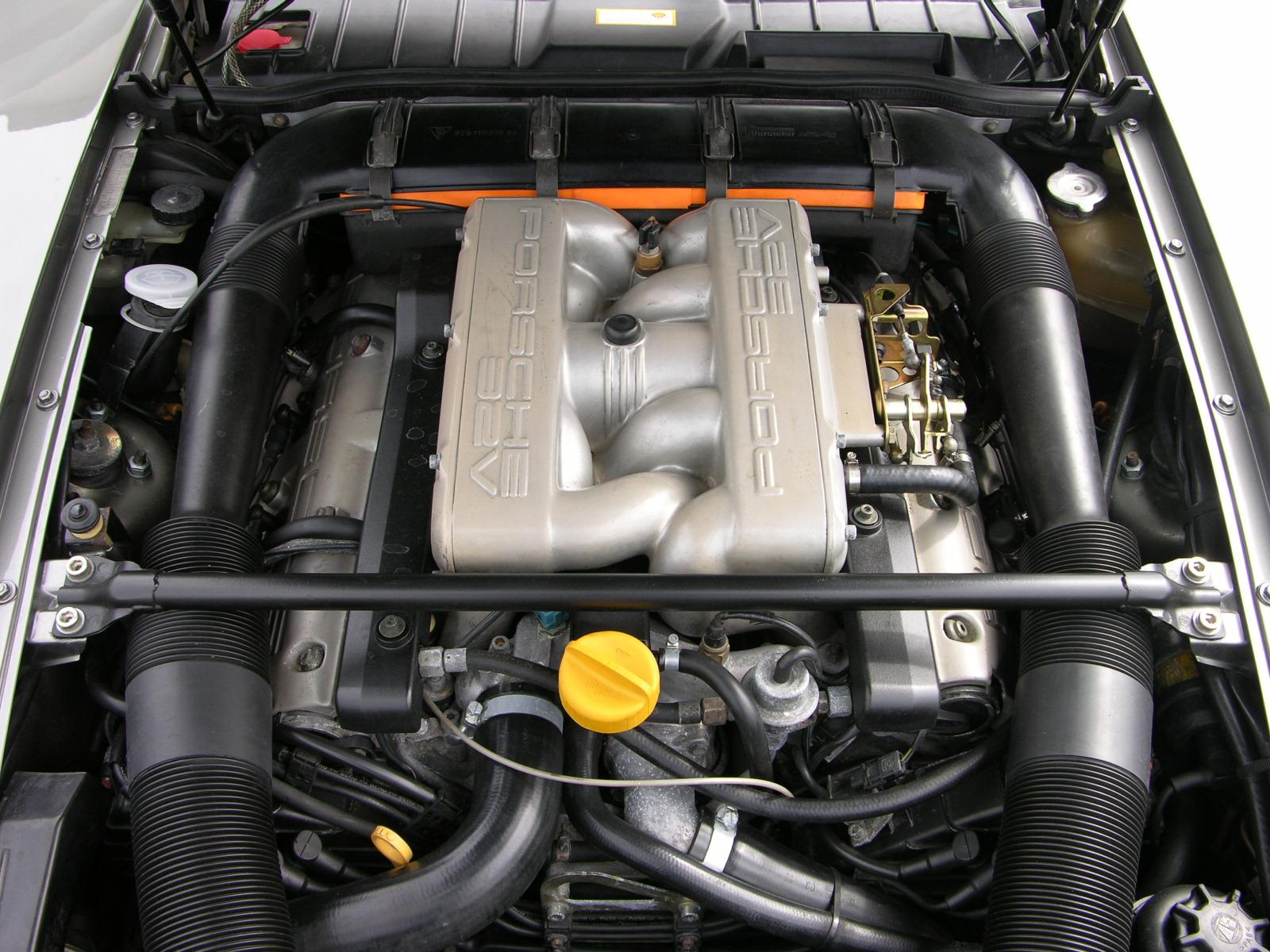
1987 928 V8

- 1977–1982 4.5 L (4,474 cc) 176 kW (239 PS; 236 bhp) (at 5,500 rpm) 350 N⋅m (258 lb⋅ft) (at 3,600 rpm) water-cooled SOHC V8 (928)
- 1980–1984 4.7 L (4,664 cc) 221 kW (300 PS; 296 bhp) (at 5,900 rpm) 385 N⋅m (284 lb⋅ft) (at 4,500 rpm) water-cooled SOHC V8 (928 S)
- 1984–1986 4.7 L (4,664 cc) 228 kW (310 PS; 306 bhp) (at 5,900 rpm) 400 N⋅m (295 lb⋅ft) (at 4,100 rpm) water-cooled SOHC V8 (928 S, 942)
- 1986 5.0 L (4,957 cc) 212 kW (288 PS; 284 bhp) (at 5,750 rpm) 410 N⋅m (302 lb⋅ft) (at 2,700 rpm) water-cooled DOHC V8 (928 S)
- 1987–1991 5.0 L (4,957 cc) 235 kW (320 PS; 315 bhp) (at 6,000 rpm) 430 N⋅m (317 lb⋅ft) (at 3,000 rpm) water-cooled DOHC V8 (928 S4, S4 Clubsport)
- 1989–1991 5.0 L (4,957 cc) 243 kW (330 PS; 326 bhp) (at 6,200 rpm) 430 N⋅m (317 lb⋅ft) (at 4,100 rpm) water-cooled DOHC V8 (928 GT)
- 1992–1995 5.4 L (5,397 cc) 257 kW (349 PS; 345 bhp) (at 5,700 rpm) 500 N⋅m (369 lb⋅ft) (at 4,250 rpm) water-cooled DOHC V8 (928 GTS)

Porsche 928 engines
Vehicle	Engine	MY	Engine numbers	Technical data
928	M28.01	1978	8 818 0001>9000	8 Cyl / 4.5L / 177 kW (237 hp)
928 M249	M28.02	1978	8 818 9001>9999	8 Cyl / 4.5L / 177 kW (237 hp)
928 (USA)(CDN)(J)	M28.03	1978	8 828 0001>9000	8 Cyl / 4.5L / 169 kW (227 hp)
928 M249 (USA)(CDN)(J)	M28.04	1978	8 828 9001>9999	8 Cyl / 4.5L / 169 kW (227 hp)
928	M28.01	1979	9 819 0001>5000	8 Cyl / 4.5L / 177 kW (237 hp)
928 M249	M28.02	1979	9 819 5001>9999	8 Cyl / 4.5L / 177 kW (237 hp)
928 (USA)(CDN)(J)	M28.03	1979	9 829 0001>5000	8 Cyl / 4.5L / 169 kW (227 hp)
928 M249 (USA)(CDN)(J)	M28.04	1979	9 829 5001>9999	8 Cyl / 4.5L / 169 kW (227 hp)
928	M28.09	1980	A 800 0001>5000	8 Cyl / 4.5L / 177 kW (237 hp)
928 M249	M28.10	1980	A 800 5001>5999	8 Cyl / 4.5L / 177 kW (237 hp)
928 S	M28.11	1980	A 820 0001>1000	8 Cyl / 4.7L / 221 kW (296 hp)
928 S M249	M28.12	1980	A 820 5001>6000	8 Cyl / 4.7L / 221 kW (296 hp)
928 (USA)(CDN)(J)	M28.13	1980	A 810 0001>5000	8 Cyl / 4.5L / 170 kW (228 hp)
928 M249 (USA)(CDN)(J)	M28.14	1980	A 810 5001>9999	8 Cyl / 4.5L / 170 kW (228 hp)
928	M28.09	1981	B 801 0001>5000	8 Cyl / 4.5L / 177 kW (237 hp)
928 M249	M28.10	1981	B 801 5001>8000	8 Cyl / 4.5L / 177 kW (237 hp)
928 S	M28.11	1981	B 821 0001>5000	8 Cyl / 4.7L / 221 kW (296 hp)
928 S M249	M28.12	1981	B 821 5001>8000	8 Cyl / 4.7L / 221 kW (296 hp)
928 (USA)(CDN)	M28.15	1981	B 811 0001>5000	8 Cyl / 4.5L / 170 kW (228 hp)
928 M249 (USA)(CDN)	M28.16	1981	B 811 5001>8000	8 Cyl / 4.5L / 170 kW (228 hp)
928 (J)	M28.17	1981	B 801 8001>9000	8 Cyl / 4.5L / 170 kW (228 hp)
928 M249 (J)	M28.18	1981	B 801 9001>9999	8 Cyl / 4.5L / 170 kW (228 hp)
928	M28.09	1982	C 80C 0001>5000	8 Cyl / 4.5L / 177 kW (237 hp)
928 M249	M28.10	1982	C 80C 5001>8000	8 Cyl / 4.5L / 177 kW (237 hp)
928 S	M28.11	1982	C 82C 0001>5000	8 Cyl / 4.7L / 221 kW (296 hp)
928 S M249	M28.12	1982	C 82C 5001>8000	8 Cyl / 4.7L / 221 kW (296 hp)
928 (USA)(CDN)	M28.15	1982	C 81C 0001>5000	8 Cyl / 4.5L / 170 kW (228 hp)
928 M249 (USA)(CDN)	M28.16	1982	C 81C 5001>8000	8 Cyl / 4.5L / 170 kW (228 hp)
928 (J)	M28.17	1982	C 80C 8001>9000	8 Cyl / 4.5L / 170 kW (228 hp)
928 M249 (J)	M28.18	1982	C 80C 9001>9999	8 Cyl / 4.5L / 170 kW (228 hp)
928 S	M28.11	1983	D 82D 0001>5000	8 Cyl / 4.7L / 221 kW (296 hp)
928 S M249	M28.12	1983	D 82D 5001>8000	8 Cyl / 4.7L / 221 kW (296 hp)
928 S (USA)(CDN)	M28.19	1983	D 81D 0001>5000	8 Cyl / 4.7L / 178 kW (239 hp)
928 S M249 (USA)(CDN)	M28.20	1983	D 81D 5001>8000	8 Cyl / 4.7L / 178 kW (239 hp)
928 S (J)	M28.20	1983	D 81D 9001>9999	8 Cyl / 4.7L / 178 kW (239 hp)
928 S	M28.21	1984	E 82E 00001>05000	8 Cyl / 4.7L / 228 kW (306 hp)
928 S M249	M28.22	1984	E 82E 05001>10000	8 Cyl / 4.7L / 228 kW (306 hp)
928 S (USA)(CDN)	M28.19	1984	E 81E 00001>05000	8 Cyl / 4.7L / 178 kW (239 hp)
928 S M249 (USA)(CDN)	M28.20	1984	E 81E 05001>10000	8 Cyl / 4.7L / 178 kW (239 hp)
928 S (J)	M28.20	1984	E 81E 05001>10000	8 Cyl / 4.7L / 178 kW (239 hp)
928 S	M28.21	1985	F 82F 00001>05000	8 Cyl / 4.7L / 228 kW (306 hp)
928 S M249	M28.22	1985	F 82F 05001>10000	8 Cyl / 4.7L / 228 kW (306 hp)
928 S M298	M28.43	1985	F 81F 00001>05000	8 Cyl / 4.7L / 200 kW (268 hp)
928 S M299	M28.44	1985	F 81F 05001>10000	8 Cyl / 4.7L / 200 kW (268 hp)
928 S (USA)(CDN)	M28.43	1985	F 81F 00001>05000	8 Cyl / 4.7L / 200 kW (268 hp)
928 S M249 (USA)(CDN)	M28.44	1985	F 81F 05001>10000	8 Cyl / 4.7L / 200 kW (268 hp)
928 S (J)	M28.44	1985	F 81F 05001>10000	8 Cyl / 4.7L / 200 kW (268 hp)
928 S	M28.21	1986	G 82G 00001>05000	8 Cyl / 4.7L / 228 kW (306 hp)
928 S M249	M28.22	1986	G 82G 05001>10000	8 Cyl / 4.7L / 228 kW (306 hp)
928 S M298	M28.45	1986	G 89G 00001>05000	8 Cyl / 4.7L / 212 kW (284 hp)
928 S M299	M28.46	1986	G 89G 05001>10000	8 Cyl / 4.7L / 212 kW (284 hp)
928 S M251 (CH)(S)	M28.22	1986	G 82G 05001>10000	8 Cyl / 4.7L / 228 kW (306 hp)
928 S (AUS)	M28.46	1986	G 89G 05001>10000	8 Cyl / 4.7L / 212 kW (284 hp)
928 S (USA)(CDN)	M28.43	1986	G 81G 00001>05000	8 Cyl / 4.7L / 215 kW (288 hp)
928 S M249 (USA)(CDN)	M28.44	1986	G 81G 05001>10000	8 Cyl / 4.7L / 215 kW (288 hp)
928 S (J)	M28.44	1986	G 81G 05001>10000	8 Cyl / 4.7L / 215 kW (288 hp)
928 S4	M28.41	1987	H 81H 00001>05000	8 Cyl / 5.0L / 235 kW (315 hp)
928 S4 M249	M28.42	1987	H 81H 05001>10000	8 Cyl / 5.0L / 235 kW (315 hp)
928 S4/CS M637	M28.41	1988	J 81J 00001>05000	8 Cyl / 5.0L / 235 kW (315 hp)
928 S4 M249	M28.42	1988	J 81J 05001>10000	8 Cyl / 5.0L / 235 kW (315 hp)
928 S4/CS M637	M28.41	1989	K 81K 00001>05000	8 Cyl / 5.0L / 235 kW (315 hp)
928 S4 M249	M28.42	1989	K 81K 05001>10000	8 Cyl / 5.0L / 235 kW (315 hp)
928 GT	M28.47	1989	K 85K 00061>50000	8 Cyl / 5.0L / 243 kW (326 hp)
928 S4	M28.42	1990	L 81L 50001>60000	8 Cyl / 5.0L / 235 kW (315 hp)
928 GT	M28.47	1990	L 85L 00061>50000	8 Cyl / 5.0L / 243 kW (326 hp)
928 S4	M28.42	1991	M 81M 50001>60000	8 Cyl / 5.0L / 235 kW (315 hp)
928 GT	M28.47	1991	M 85M 00001>50000	8 Cyl / 5.0L / 243 kW (326 hp)
928 GTS	M28.49	1992	N 85N 00501>20000	8 Cyl / 5.4L / 257 kW (345 hp)
928 GTS M249	M28.50	1992	N 81N 50501>60000	8 Cyl / 5.4L / 257 kW (345 hp)
928 GTS	M28.49	1993	P 85P 00501>20000	8 Cyl / 5.4L / 257 kW (345 hp)
928 GTS M249	M28.50	1993	P 81P 50501>60000	8 Cyl / 5.4L / 257 kW (345 hp)
928 GTS	M28.49	1994	R 85R 00501>20000	8 Cyl / 5.4L / 257 kW (345 hp)
928 GTS M249	M28.50	1994	R 81R 50501>60000	8 Cyl / 5.4L / 257 kW (345 hp)
928 GTS	M28.49	1995	S 85S 00501>20000	8 Cyl / 5.4L / 257 kW (345 hp)
928 GTS M249	M28.50	1995	S 81S 50501>60000	8 Cyl / 5.4L / 257 kW (345 hp)

=== Porsche 934.99 ===
- 1976 3.0 L (2,994 cc) 485 kW (659 PS; 650 bhp) 588 N⋅m (434 lbf⋅ft) Type 930 air-cooled, four-stroke, bi-turbo boxer flat-six
- 1977 3.0 L (2,994 cc) 540 kW (734 PS; 724 bhp) 607 N⋅m (448 lbf⋅ft) Type 930 air-cooled, four-stroke, bi-turbo boxer flat-six
- 1979 3.0 L (2,994 cc) 600 kW (816 PS; 805 bhp) Type 930 air-cooled, four-stroke, bi-turbo boxer flat-six

=== Porsche 935 ===
- 1976–1977 2.9 L (2,857 cc) 433 kW (589 PS; 581 bhp) 588 N⋅m (434 lbf⋅ft) air-cooled turbo boxer flat-six (935, 935/77)
- 1976 2.9 L (2,857 cc) 463 kW (630 PS; 621 bhp) 588 N⋅m (434 lbf⋅ft) air-cooled bi-turbo boxer flat-six (935/77)
- 1977 1.4 L (1,425 cc) 279 kW (379 PS; 374 bhp) air-cooled turbo boxer flat-six (935/2.0 Baby)
- 1978 2.9 L (2,857 cc) 441 kW (600 PS; 591 bhp) 588 N⋅m (434 lbf⋅ft) air-cooled bi-turbo boxer flat-six (935/78)
- 1978 3.2 L (3,211 cc) 620 kW (843 PS; 831 bhp) 785 N⋅m (579 lbf⋅ft) bi-turbo boxer flat-six (air-cooled cylinders, water-cooled heads) (935/78 Moby Dick)
- 1979–1980 3.1 L (3,124 cc) 500 kW (680 PS; 671 bhp) 706 N⋅m (521 lbf⋅ft) air-cooled turbo boxer flat-six (935/79, 935/80)

=== Porsche 936 ===
- 1976 2.1 L (2,142 cc) 382 kW (519 PS; 512 bhp) 480 N⋅m (354 lbf⋅ft) air-cooled turbo boxer flat-six (936 Spyder)
- 1977 2.1 L (2,142 cc) 397 kW (540 PS; 532 bhp) 490 N⋅m (361 lbf⋅ft) air-cooled bi-turbo boxer flat-six (936/77 Spyder)
- 1978 2.1 L (2,140 cc) 426 kW (579 PS; 571 bhp) bi-turbo boxer flat-six (air-cooled cylinders, water-cooled heads) (936/78 Spyder)
- 1981 2.7 L (2,650 cc) 455 kW (619 PS; 610 bhp) 539 N⋅m (398 lbf⋅ft) bi-turbo boxer flat-six (air-cooled cylinders, water-cooled heads) (936/81 Spyder)

=== Porsche 944 (944/951) ===
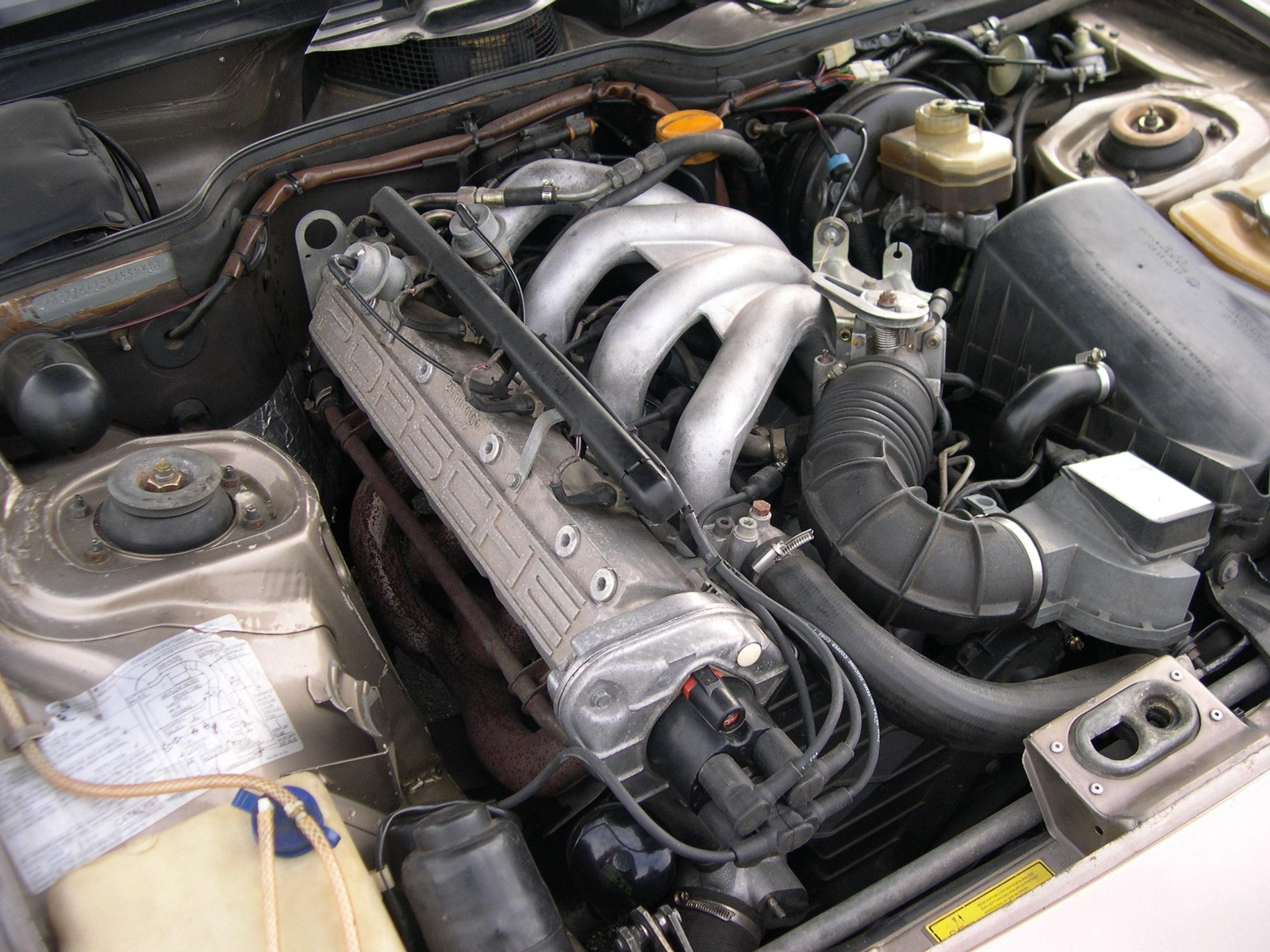
1986 944 engine bay

- 1982–1988 2.5 L (2,479 cc) 120 kW (163 PS; 161 bhp) (at 5,800 rpm) 205 N⋅m (151 lb⋅ft) (at 3,000 rpm) water-cooled SOHC inline four-cylinder (944)
- 1985–1987 2.5 L (2,479 cc) 110 kW (150 PS; 148 bhp) (at 5,800 rpm) 195 N⋅m (144 lb⋅ft) (at 3,000 rpm) water-cooled SOHC inline four-cylinder (944)
- 1988–1989 2.5 L (2,479 cc) 118 kW (160 PS; 158 bhp) (at 5,800 rpm) 210 N⋅m (155 lb⋅ft) (at 4,500 rpm) water-cooled SOHC inline four-cylinder (944)
- 1989–1991 2.7 L (2,681 cc) 121 kW (165 PS; 162 bhp) (at 5,800 rpm) 225 N⋅m (166 lb⋅ft) (at 4,200 rpm) water-cooled SOHC inline four-cylinder (944)
- 1986–1988 2.5 L (2,479 cc) 140 kW (190 PS; 188 bhp) (at 6,000 rpm) 230 N⋅m (170 lb⋅ft) (at 4,300 rpm) water-cooled DOHC inline four-cylinder (944 S)
- 1988–1991 3.0 L (2,990 cc) 155 kW (211 PS; 208 bhp) (at 5,800 rpm) 280 N⋅m (207 lb⋅ft) (at 4,000 rpm) water-cooled DOHC inline four-cylinder (944 S2)

951

- 1985–1988 2.5 L (2,479 cc) 162 kW (220 PS; 217 bhp) (at 5,800 rpm) 330 N⋅m (243 lb⋅ft) (at 3,500 rpm) water-cooled SOHC turbo inline four-cylinder (944 Turbo)
- 1988–1991 2.5 L (2,479 cc) 184 kW (250 PS; 247 bhp) (at 6,000 rpm) 350 N⋅m (258 lb⋅ft) (at 4,000 rpm) water-cooled SOHC turbo inline four-cylinder (944 Turbo, Turbo S)

Porsche 944 engines
Vehicle	Engine	MY	Engine numbers	Technical data
944	M44.01	1982	C 41C 0001>5000	4 Cyl / 2.5L / 120 kW (161 hp)
944 M249	M44.03	1982	C 41C 5001>8000	4 Cyl / 2.5L / 120 kW (161 hp)
944	M44.01	1983	D 41D 0001>E999	4 Cyl / 2.5L / 120 kW (161 hp)
944 M249	M44.03	1983	D 41D 5001>9999	4 Cyl / 2.5L / 120 kW (161 hp)
944 (USA)(CDN)(J)	M44.02	1983	D 43D 0001>J999	4 Cyl / 2.5L / 110 kW (148 hp)
944 M249 (USA)(CDN)(J)	M44.04	1982	D 43D 5001>9999	4 Cyl / 2.5L / 110 kW (148 hp)
944	M44.01	1984	E 41E 00001>20000	4 Cyl / 2.5L / 120 kW (161 hp)
944 M249	M44.03	1984	E 41E 20001>30000	4 Cyl / 2.5L / 120 kW (161 hp)
944 (USA)(CDN)(J)	M44.02	1984	E 43E 00001>20000	4 Cyl / 2.5L / 110 kW (148 hp)
944 M249 (USA)(CDN)(J)	M44.04	1984	E 43E 20001>30000	4 Cyl / 2.5L / 110 kW (148 hp)
944	M44.01	1985	F 41F 40001>50000	4 Cyl / 2.5L / 120 kW (161 hp)
944 M249	M44.03	1985	F 41F 50001>60000	4 Cyl / 2.5L / 120 kW (161 hp)
944 (USA)(CDN)(J)	M44.02	1985	F 43F 40001>50000	4 Cyl / 2.5L / 110 kW (148 hp)
944 M249 (USA)(CDN)(J)	M44.04	1985	F 43F 50001>60000	4 Cyl / 2.5L / 110 kW (148 hp)
944	M44.05	1985	F 41F 00001>20000	4 Cyl / 2.5L / 120 kW (161 hp)
944 M249	M44.06	1985	F 41F 20001>30000	4 Cyl / 2.5L / 120 kW (161 hp)
944	M44.07	1985	F 43F 00001>20000	4 Cyl / 2.5L / 110 kW (148 hp)
944 M249	M44.08	1985	F 43F 20001>30000	4 Cyl / 2.5L / 110 kW (148 hp)
944	M44.05	1986	G 41G 00001>20000	4 Cyl / 2.5L / 120 kW (161 hp)
944 M298	M44.06	1986	G 41G 20001>30000	4 Cyl / 2.5L / 120 kW (161 hp)
944 M298	M44.07	1986	G 43G 00001>60000	4 Cyl / 2.5L / 110 kW (148 hp)
944 M299	M44.08	1986	G 43G 60001>90000	4 Cyl / 2.5L / 110 kW (148 hp)
944 Turbo	M44.50	1986	G 44G 00001>00400	4 Cyl / 2.5L / 162 kW (217 hp)
944 Turbo	M44.51	1986	G 45G 00001>20000	4 Cyl / 2.5L / 162 kW (217 hp)
944	M44.05	1987	H 41H 00001>20000	4 Cyl / 2.5L / 120 kW (161 hp)
944 M249	M44.06	1987	H 41H 20001>30000	4 Cyl / 2.5L / 120 kW (161 hp)
944 M298	M44.07	1987	H 43H 00001>60000	4 Cyl / 2.5L / 110 kW (148 hp)
944 M299	M44.08	1987	H 43H 60001>90000	4 Cyl / 2.5L / 110 kW (148 hp)
944 S	M44.40	1987	H 42H 00001>50000	4 Cyl / 2.5L / 140 kW (188 hp)
944 Turbo	M44.51	1987	H 45H 00001>10000	4 Cyl / 2.5L / 162 kW (217 hp)
944	M44.09	1988	J 46J 00001>60000	4 Cyl / 2.5L / 118 kW (158 hp)
944 M249	M44.10	1988	J 46J 60001>70000	4 Cyl / 2.5L / 118 kW (158 hp)
944 S	M44.40	1988	J 42J 00001>50000	4 Cyl / 2.5L / 140 kW (188 hp)
944 Turbo	M44.51	1988	J 45J 00001>10000	4 Cyl / 2.5L / 162 kW (217 hp)
944 Turbo S	M44.52	1988	J 47J 00061>10000	4 Cyl / 2.5L / 184 kW (247 hp)
944	M44.11	1989	K 46K 00001>60000	4 Cyl / 2.7L / 121 kW (162 hp)
944 M249	M44.12	1989	K 46K 60001>70000	4 Cyl / 2.7L / 121 kW (162 hp)
944 S2	M44.41	1989	K 42K 00001>50000	4 Cyl / 3.0L / 155 kW (208 hp)
944 Turbo	M44.52	1989	K 47K 00001>10000	4 Cyl / 2.5L / 184 kW (247 hp)
944 S2	M44.41	1990	L 42L 00001>50000	4 Cyl / 3.0L / 155 kW (208 hp)
944 Turbo	M44.52	1990	L 47L 00001>10000	4 Cyl / 2.5L / 184 kW (247 hp)
944 S2	M44.41	1991	M 42M 00001>50000	4 Cyl / 3.0L / 155 kW (208 hp)
944 Turbo	M44.52	1991	M 47M 00001>01000	4 Cyl / 2.5L / 184 kW (247 hp)

=== Porsche 956 ===
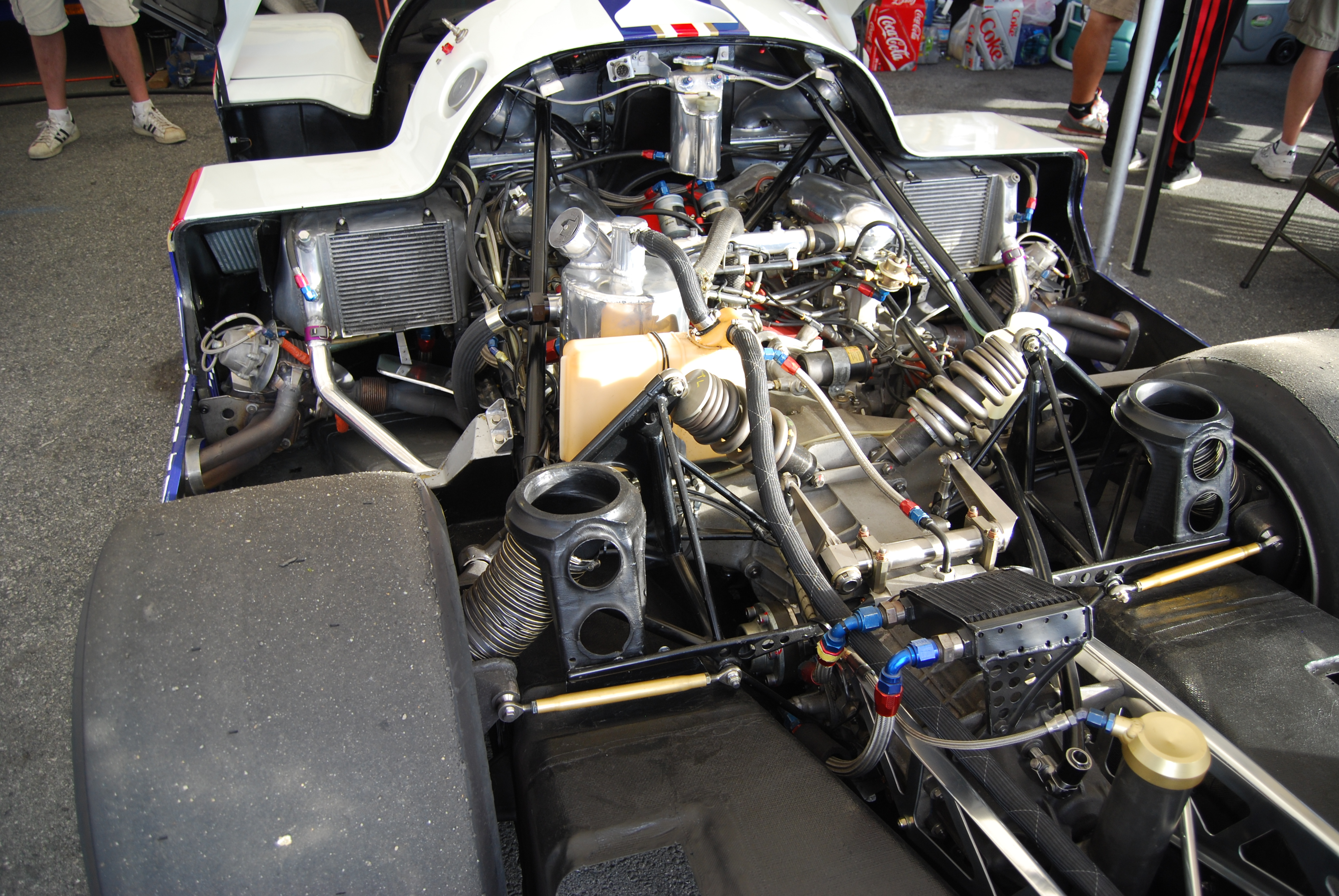
956: 2.6L flat-six twin turbo

- 1982–1983 2.6 L (2,649 cc) 455 kW (619 PS; 610 bhp) 630 N⋅m (465 lb⋅ft) DOHC 24-valve boxer flat-six (air-cooled cylinders, water-cooled heads)
- 1983–1984 2.6 L (2,649 cc) 470 kW (639 PS; 630 bhp) 630 N⋅m (465 lb⋅ft) DOHC 24-valve boxer flat-six (air-cooled cylinders, water-cooled heads)

=== Porsche 959 ===
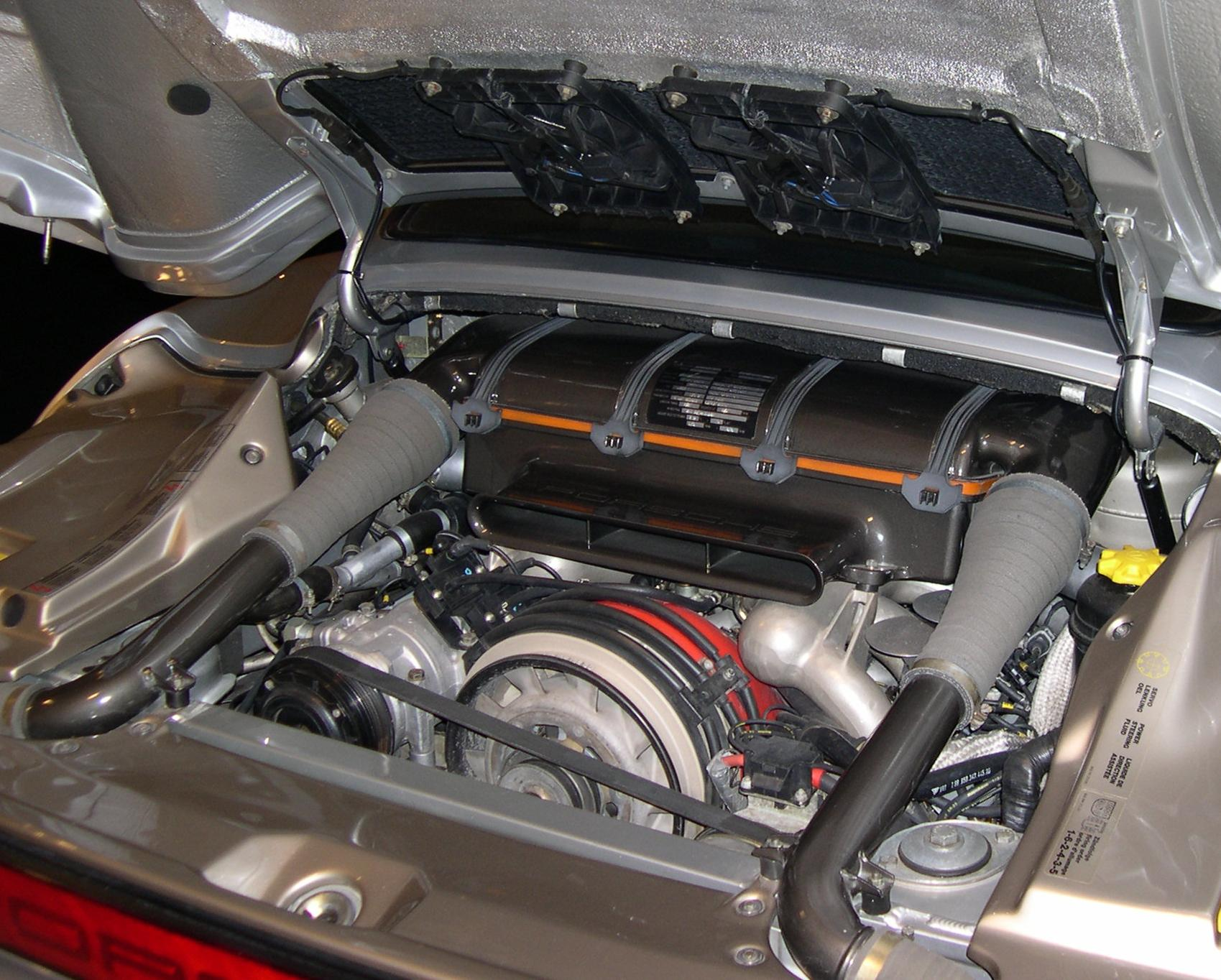
959: 2.8L flat-six twin turbo

- 1987–1988 2.8 L (2,849 cc) 450 PS (331 kW; 444 bhp) 500 N⋅m (369 lb⋅ft) DOHC 24-valve boxer flat-six (air-cooled cylinders, water-cooled heads)
- 1987–1988 2.8 L (2,849 cc) 515 PS (379 kW; 508 bhp) DOHC 24-valve boxer flat-six (air-cooled cylinders, water-cooled heads) (959 S)

Porsche 959 engines
Vehicle	Engine	MY	Engine numbers	Technical data
959 Coupe	959.50	1987	H 65H 00001-01000	6 Cyl / 2.85L / 330 kW (443 hp)
959 Coupe	959.50	1988	J 65H 00001-01000	6 Cyl / 2.85L / 330 kW (443 hp)

=== Porsche 961 ===
- 1986–1987 2.8 L (2,847 cc) 500 kW (680 PS; 671 bhp) 656 N⋅m (484 lbf⋅ft) Type 935/82 bi-turbo boxer flat-six (air-cooled cylinders, water-cooled heads)

=== Porsche 962 ===
- 1984–1991 2.9 L (2,869 cc) 500 kW (680 PS; 671 bhp) four-stroke turbo boxer flat-six (air-cooled cylinders, water-cooled heads)

=== Porsche 968 ===
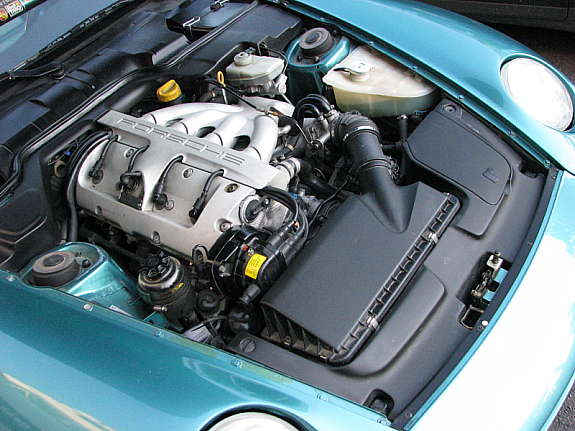
968: 3.0L inline-four

- 1991–1995 3.0 L (2,990 cc) 176 kW (239 PS; 236 bhp) (at 6,200 rpm) 305 N⋅m (225 lb⋅ft) (at 4,100 rpm) water-cooled DOHC 16-valve inline-four-cylinder (968, 968 CS)
- 1993–1994 3.0 L (2,990 cc) 227 kW (309 PS; 304 bhp) (at 5,400 rpm) 500 N⋅m (369 lb⋅ft) (at 3,000 rpm) water-cooled turbo SOHC 16-valve inline-four-cylinder (968 Turbo S)
- 1993–1994 3.0 L (2,990 cc) 257 kW (349 PS; 345 bhp) (at 6,900 rpm) 500 N⋅m (369 lb⋅ft) (at 3,000 rpm) water-cooled turbo SOHC 16-valve inline-four-cylinder (968 Turbo RS)

Porsche 968 engines
Vehicle	Engine	MY	Engine numbers	Technical data
968	M44.43	1992	N 42N 00501>20000	4 Cyl / 3.0L / 176 kW (236 hp)
968 M249	M44.44	1992	N 42N 50501>60000	4 Cyl / 3.0L / 176 kW (236 hp)
968	M44.43	1993	P 42P 00501>20000	4 Cyl / 3.0L / 176 kW (236 hp)
968 M249	M44.44	1993	P 42P 50501>60000	4 Cyl / 3.0L / 176 kW (236 hp)
968	M44.43	1994	R 42R 00501>20000	4 Cyl / 3.0L / 176 kW (236 hp)
968 M249	M44.44	1994	R 42R 50501>60000	4 Cyl / 3.0L / 176 kW (236 hp)
968	M44.43	1995	S 42S 00501>20000	4 Cyl / 3.0L / 176 kW (236 hp)
968 M249	M44.44	1995	S 42S 50501>60000	4 Cyl / 3.0L / 176 kW (236 hp)

=== Porsche Boxster ===
See Porsche Boxster and Cayman

==== 986 ====
See Porsche Boxster (986)

- 1997–1999 2.5 L (2,480 cc) 204 PS (150 kW; 201 bhp) 245 N⋅m (181 lb⋅ft) water-cooled DOHC 24-valve Boxer flat-six "M96.20"
- 2000–2002 2.7 L (2,687 cc) 220 PS (162 kW; 217 bhp) 260 N⋅m (192 lb⋅ft) water-cooled DOHC 24-valve Boxer flat-six (VarioCam) "M96.22"
- 2003–2004 2.7 L (2,687 cc) 228 PS (168 kW; 225 bhp) 260 N⋅m (192 lb⋅ft) water-cooled DOHC 24-valve Boxer flat-six (VarioCam Plus) "M96.23"
- 2000–2002 3.2 L (3,179 cc) 252 PS (185 kW; 249 bhp) 305 N⋅m (225 lb⋅ft) water-cooled DOHC 24-valve Boxer flat-six (VarioCam) "M96.21" (Boxster S)
- 2003–2004 3.2 L (3,179 cc) 260 PS (191 kW; 256 bhp) 310 N⋅m (229 lb⋅ft) water-cooled DOHC 24-valve Boxer flat-six (VarioCam Plus) "M96.24" (Boxster S)
- 2004 3.2 L (3,179 cc) 265 PS (195 kW; 261 bhp) 310 N⋅m (229 lb⋅ft) water-cooled DOHC 24-valve Boxer flat-six (VarioCam Plus) "M96.24" (Boxster S "50 Jahre 550 Spyder")

Porsche 986 engines
Vehicle	Engine	MY	Engine numbers	Technical data
Boxster	M96.20	1997	V 65V 00501>60000	6 Cyl / 2.5L / 150 kW (201 hp)
Boxster	M96.20	1998	W 65W 00501>60000	6 Cyl / 2.5L / 150 kW (201 hp)
Boxster	M96.20	1999	X 65X 00501>60000	6 Cyl / 2.5L / 150 kW (201 hp)
Boxster	M96.22	2000	Y 65Y 00501>60000	6 Cyl / 2.7L / 160 kW (215 hp)
Boxster	M96.22	2001	1 651 00501>60000	6 Cyl / 2.7L / 162 kW (217 hp)
Boxster	M96.22	2002	2 652 00501>60000	6 Cyl / 2.7L / 162 kW (217 hp)
Boxster	M96.23	2003	3 653 00501>60000	6 Cyl / 2.7L / 168 kW (225 hp)
Boxster	M96.23	2004	4 654 00501>60000	6 Cyl / 2.7L / 168 kW (225 hp)
Boxster S	M96.21	2000	Y 67Y 00501>60000	6 Cyl / 3.2L / 185 kW (248 hp)
Boxster S	M96.21	2001	1 671 00501>60000	6 Cyl / 3.2L / 185 kW (248 hp)
Boxster S	M96.21	2002	2 672 00501>60000	6 Cyl / 3.2L / 185 kW (248 hp)
Boxster S	M96.24	2003	3 673 00501>60000	6 Cyl / 3.2L / 191 kW (256 hp)
Boxster S	M96.24	2004	4 674 00501>60000	6 Cyl / 3.2L / 191 kW (256 hp)

==== 987 ====
See Porsche Boxster and Cayman (987)

- 2004–2006 2.7 L (2,687 cc) 240 PS (177 kW; 237 bhp) 270 N⋅m (199 lb⋅ft) water-cooled DOHC 24-valve Boxer flat-six (VarioCam) "M96.25"
- 2006–2008 2.7 L (2,687 cc) 245 PS (180 kW; 242 bhp) 273 N⋅m (201 lb⋅ft) water-cooled DOHC 24-valve Boxer flat-six (VarioCam Plus) "M97.20"
- 2004–2006 3.2 L (3,179 cc) 280 PS (206 kW; 276 bhp) 320 N⋅m (236 lb⋅ft) water-cooled DOHC 24-valve Boxer flat-six (VarioCam Plus) "M96.26" (Boxster S)
- 2006–2009 3.4 L (3,387 cc) 295 PS (217 kW; 291 bhp) 340 N⋅m (251 lb⋅ft) water-cooled DOHC 24-valve Boxer flat-six (VarioCam Plus) "M97.21" (Boxster S)
- 2007–2008 3.4 L (3,387 cc) 303 PS (223 kW; 299 bhp) 340 N⋅m (251 lb⋅ft) water-cooled DOHC 24-valve Boxer flat-six (VarioCam Plus) "M97.22" (Boxster "RS 60 Spyder Edition", Boxster S "Porsche Design Edition 2")

Porsche 987 engines
Vehicle	Engine	MY	Engine numbers	Technical data
Boxster	M96.25	05 5	615 00501>60000	6 Cyl / 2.7L / 176 kW (236 hp)
Boxster	M96.25	06 6	616 00501>60000	6 Cyl / 2.7L / 176 kW (236 hp)
Boxster	M97.20	07 7	657 00501>60000	6 Cyl / 2.7L / 180 kW (241 hp)
Boxster	M97.20	08 8	658 00501>60000	6 Cyl / 2.7L / 180 kW (241 hp)
—
Boxster "S"	M96.26	05 5	625 00501>60000	6 Cyl / 3.2L / 206 kW (276 hp)
Boxster "S"	M96.26	06 6	626 00501>60000	6 Cyl / 3.2L / 206 kW (276 hp)
Boxster "S"	M97.21	07 7	677 00501>60000	6 Cyl / 3.4L / 217 kW (291 hp)
Boxster "S"	M97.21	08 8	678 00501>60000	6 Cyl / 3.4L / 217 kW (291 hp)
—
Boxster "S" RS Spyder	M97.22	08 8	668 00501>60000	6 Cyl / 3.4L / 223 kW (299 hp)

987 II

- 2009–2012 2.9 L (2,893 cc) 255 PS (188 kW; 252 bhp) 290 N⋅m (214 lb⋅ft) water-cooled DOHC 24-valve Boxer flat-six (VarioCam Plus) "MA1.20"
- 2009–2012 3.4 L (3,436 cc) 310 PS (228 kW; 306 bhp) 360 N⋅m (266 lb⋅ft) water-cooled DOHC 24-valve Boxer flat-six (VarioCam Plus) "MA1.21" (Boxster S)
- 2010–2011 3.4 L (3,436 cc) 320 PS (235 kW; 316 bhp) 370 N⋅m (273 lb⋅ft) water-cooled DOHC 24-valve Boxer flat-six (VarioCam Plus) "MA1.22" (Boxster Spyder)

Porsche 987 II engines
Vehicle	Engine	MY	Engine numbers	Technical data
Boxster	MA1.20	09 9	__9 00501>99999	6 Cyl / 2.9L / 188 kW (252 hp)
Boxster	MA1.20	10 A	__A 00501>99999	6 Cyl / 2.9L / 188 kW (252 hp)
Boxster	MA1.20	11 B	__B 00501>60000	6 Cyl / 2.9L / 188 kW (252 hp)
Boxster	MA1.20	12 C	__C 00501>60000	6 Cyl / 2.9L / 188 kW (252 hp)
—
Boxster "S"	MA1.21	09 9	__9 00501>99999	6 Cyl / 3.4L / 228 kW (306 hp)
Boxster "S"	MA1.21	10 A	__A 00501>99999	6 Cyl / 3.4L / 228 kW (306 hp)
Boxster "S"	MA1.21	11 B	__B 00501>60000	6 Cyl / 3.4L / 228 kW (306 hp)
Boxster "S"	MA1.21	12 C	__C 00501>60000	6 Cyl / 3.4L / 228 kW (306 hp)
—
Boxster Spyder	MA1.21	11 B	C_B 50501>60000	6 Cyl / 3.4L / 235 kW (315 hp)
Boxster Spyder	MA1.21	12 C	C_C 50501>60000	6 Cyl / 3.4L / 235 kW (315 hp)

==== 981 ====
See Porsche Boxster and Cayman (981)

- 2012–2014 2.7 L (2,706 cc) 265 PS (195 kW; 261 bhp) 280 N⋅m (207 lb⋅ft) water-cooled DOHC 24-valve Boxer flat-six (VarioCam Plus) "MA1.22"
- 2014–2016 3.4 L (3,436 cc) 315 PS (232 kW; 311 bhp) 360 N⋅m (266 lb⋅ft) water-cooled DOHC 24-valve Boxer flat-six (VarioCam Plus) "MA1.23" (Boxster S)
- 2014–2016 3.4 L (3,436 cc) 330 PS (243 kW; 325 bhp) 370 N⋅m (273 lb⋅ft) water-cooled DOHC 24-valve Boxer flat-six (VarioCam Plus) "MA1.23" (Boxster GTS)
- 2015–2016 3.8 L (3,800 cc) 375 PS (276 kW; 370 bhp) 420 N⋅m (310 lb⋅ft) water-cooled DOHC 24-valve Boxer flat-six (VarioCam Plus) "MA1.24" (Boxster Spyder)

Porsche 981 engines
Vehicle	Engine	MY	Engine numbers	Technical data
Boxster	MA1.22	12 C	__C 00501>60000	6 Cyl / 2.7L / 195 kW (261 hp)
Boxster	MA1.22	13 D	__D 00501>60000	6 Cyl / 2.7L / 195 kW (261 hp)
Boxster	MA1.22	14 E	__E 00501>60000	6 Cyl / 2.7L / 195 kW (261 hp)
Boxster	MA1.22	15 F	__F 00501>60000	6 Cyl / 2.7L / 195 kW (261 hp)
Boxster	MA1.22	16 G	__G 00501>60000	6 Cyl / 2.7L / 195 kW (261 hp)
—
Boxster "S"	MA1.23	12 C	__C 00501>60000	6 Cyl / 3.4L / 232 kW (311 hp)
Boxster "S"	MA1.23	13 D	__D 00501>60000	6 Cyl / 3.4L / 232 kW (311 hp)
Boxster "S"	MA1.23	14 E	__E 00501>60000	6 Cyl / 3.4L / 232 kW (311 hp)
Boxster "S"	MA1.23	15 F	__F 00501>60000	6 Cyl / 3.4L / 232 kW (311 hp)
Boxster "S"	MA1.23	16 G	__G 00501>60000	6 Cyl / 3.4L / 232 kW (311 hp)
—
Boxster Spyder	MDB.XA	16 G	DBX 00501>60000	6 Cyl / 3.8L / 276 kW (370 hp)

Note: MA1.24 is classified as the "Remark". MDB.XA is the "Engine Type".

==== 982 (718) ====
See Porsche 718 Boxster and Cayman (982)

- 2016–present 2.0 L (1,988 cc) 250 PS (184 kW; 247 bhp) 310 N⋅m (229 lb⋅ft) water-cooled turbo DOHC 16-valve Boxer flat-four (VarioCam Plus) "MA2.20" (718 Boxster for Chinese market)
- 2016–present 2.0 L (1,988 cc) 300 PS (221 kW; 296 bhp) 380 N⋅m (280 lb⋅ft) water-cooled turbo DOHC 16-valve Boxer flat-four (VarioCam Plus) "MA2.20" (718 Boxster, 718 Boxster T)
- 2016–present 2.5 L (2,497 cc) 350 PS (257 kW; 345 bhp) 420 N⋅m (310 lb⋅ft) water-cooled turbo DOHC 16-valve Boxer flat-four (VarioCam Plus) "MA2.22" (718 Boxster S)
- 2017–present 2.5 L (2,497 cc) 365 PS (268 kW; 360 bhp) 430 N⋅m (317 lb⋅ft) water-cooled turbo DOHC 16-valve Boxer flat-four (VarioCam Plus) "MA2.22" (718 Boxster GTS)
- 2019–present 4.0 L (3,995 cc) 420 PS (309 kW; 414 bhp) 420 N⋅m (310 lb⋅ft) water-cooled DOHC 24-valve Boxer flat-six (VarioCam Plus) (718 Spyder)
- 2020–present 4.0 L (3,995 cc) 400 PS (294 kW; 395 bhp) 420 N⋅m (310 lb⋅ft) water-cooled DOHC 24-valve Boxer flat-six (VarioCam Plus) (718 Boxster GTS 4.0)

Porsche 982 engines
Vehicle	Engine	MY	Engine numbers	Technical data
Boxster CN	MDD.PA	17 H	__G 00501>60000	4 Cyl / 2.0L / 184 kW (247 hp)
Boxster	MDD.PB	17 H	__G 00501>60000	4 Cyl / 2.0L / 220 kW (295 hp)
—
Boxster "S"	MDD.NC	17 H	__G 00501>60000	4 Cyl / 2.5L / 257 kW (345 hp)

Note: MA2.20, MA2.22 are classified as the "Remark". MDD.PA, MDD.PB, MDD.NC are the "Engine Type".

=== Porsche Carrera GT (980) ===
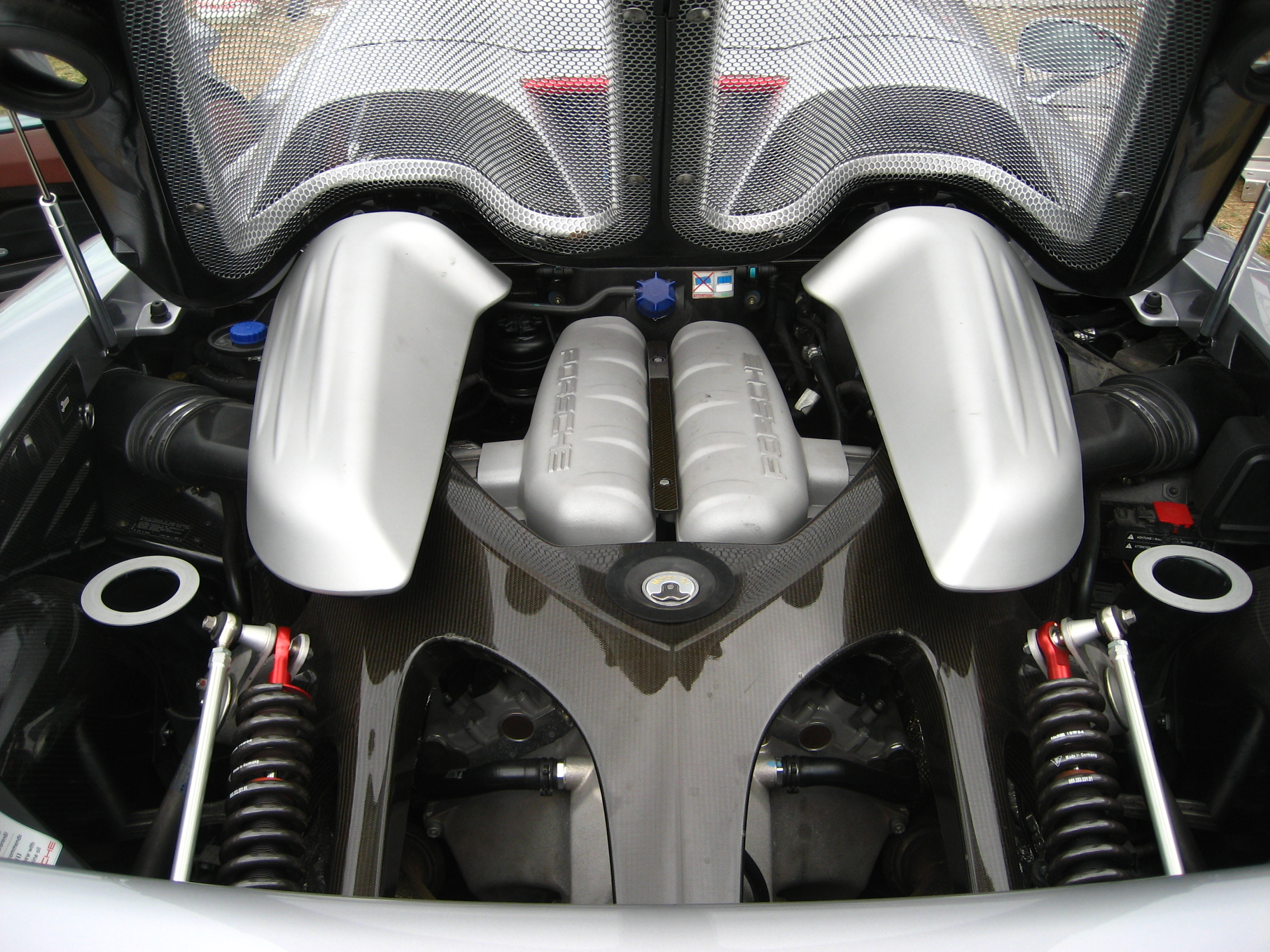
Carrera GT: 5.7L V10

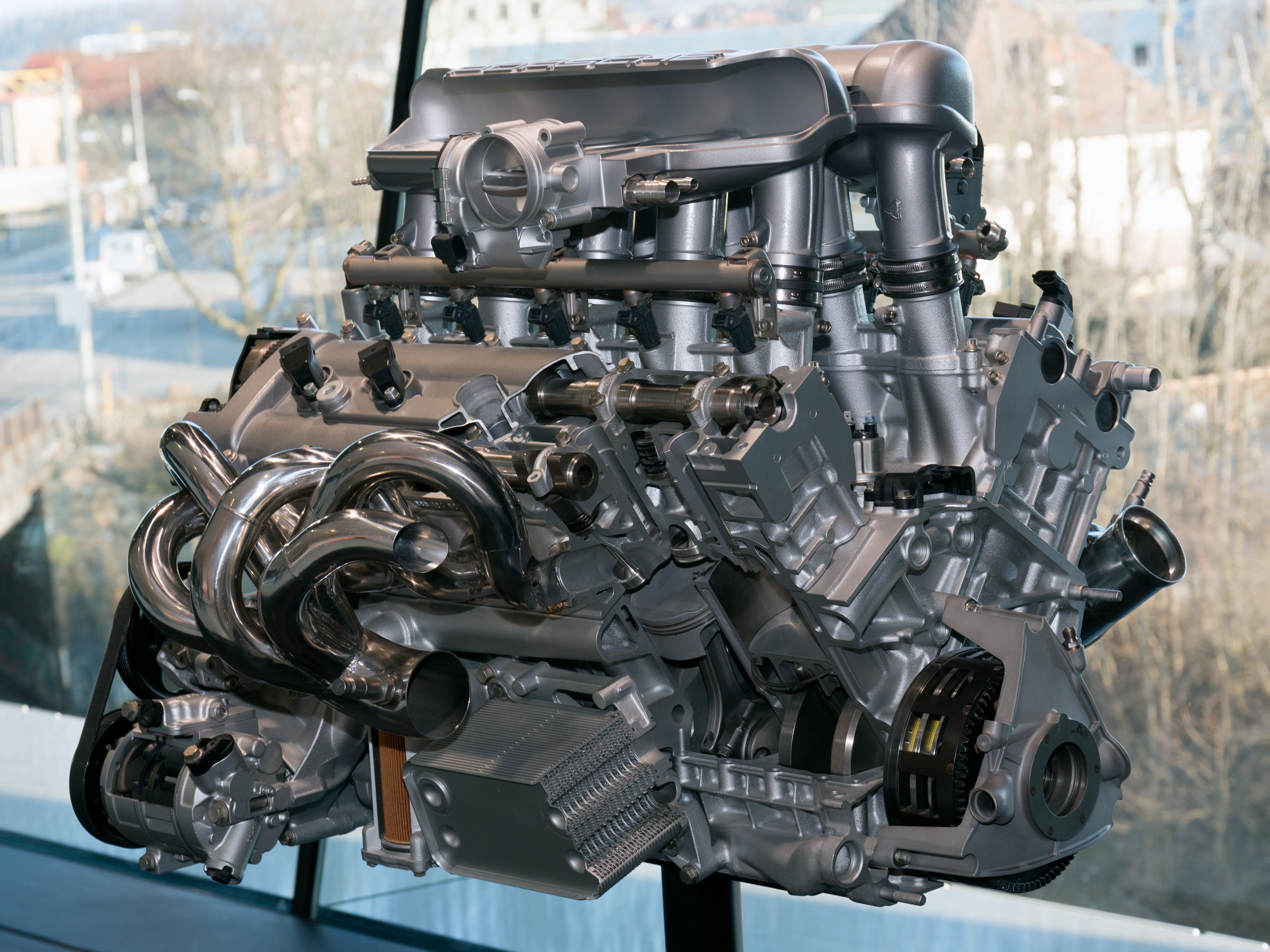
Carrera GT: 5.7L V10

- 2004–2006 5.7 L (5,733 cc) 450 kW (612 PS; 603 bhp) V10 (derived from Porsche LMP2000)

Porsche 980 engines
Vehicle	Engine	MY	Engine numbers	Technical data
980 Carrera GT	M80.01	04 4	994 00501>20000	10 Cyl / 5.7L / 450 kW (603 hp)
980 Carrera GT	M80.01	05 5	905 30501>60000	10 Cyl / 5.7L / 450 kW (603 hp)
980 Carrera GT	M80.01	06 6	906 00501>60000	10 Cyl / 5.7L / 450 kW (603 hp)

=== Porsche Cayman (987/981/982) ===
987 (987c)

- 2006–2009 2.7 L (2,687 cc) 245 PS (180 kW; 242 bhp) 273 N⋅m (201 lb⋅ft) water-cooled DOHC 24-valve Boxer flat-six (VarioCam Plus) "M97.20"
- 2005–2009 3.4 L (3,387 cc) 295 PS (217 kW; 291 bhp) 340 N⋅m (251 lb⋅ft) water-cooled DOHC 24-valve Boxer flat-six (VarioCam Plus) "M97.21" (Cayman S, Cayman S "Porsche Design Edition 1")
- 2008–2009 3.4 L (3,387 cc) 303 PS (223 kW; 299 bhp) 340 N⋅m (251 lb⋅ft) water-cooled DOHC 24-valve Boxer flat-six (VarioCam Plus) "M97.22" (Cayman S Sport)

Porsche 987c engines
Vehicle	Engine	MY	Engine numbers	Technical data
Cayman	M97.20	07 7	657 00501>60000	6 Cyl / 2.7L / 180 kW (241 hp)
Cayman	M97.20	08 8	658 00501>60000	6 Cyl / 2.7L / 180 kW (241 hp)
—
Cayman "S"	M97.21	06 6	676 00501>60000	6 Cyl / 3.4L / 217 kW (291 hp)
Cayman "S"	M97.21	07 7	677 00501>60000	6 Cyl / 3.4L / 217 kW (291 hp)
Cayman "S"	M97.21	08 8	678 00501>60000	6 Cyl / 3.4L / 217 kW (291 hp)
—
Cayman "S Sport"	M97.22	08 8	668 00501>60000	6 Cyl / 3.4L / 223 kW (299 hp)

987 II (987c)

- 2009–2012 2.9 L (2,893 cc) 265 PS (195 kW; 261 bhp) 300 N⋅m (221 lb⋅ft) water-cooled DOHC 24-valve Boxer flat-six (VarioCam Plus) "MA1.20"
- 2009–2012 3.4 L (3,436 cc) 320 PS (235 kW; 316 bhp) 370 N⋅m (273 lb⋅ft) water-cooled DOHC 24-valve Boxer flat-six (VarioCam Plus) "MA1.21" (Cayman S)
- 2010–2011 3.4 L (3,436 cc) 330 PS (243 kW; 325 bhp) 370 N⋅m (273 lb⋅ft) water-cooled DOHC 24-valve Boxer flat-six (VarioCam Plus) "MA1.21" (Cayman R, Cayman S Black Edition)

Porsche 987c II engines
Vehicle	Engine	MY	Engine numbers	Technical data
Cayman	MA1.20	09 9	C_9 00501>99999	6 Cyl / 2.9L / 195 kW (261 hp)
Cayman	MA1.20	10 A	C_A 00501>99999	6 Cyl / 2.9L / 195 kW (261 hp)
Cayman	MA1.20	11 B	C_B 00501>99999	6 Cyl / 2.9L / 195 kW (261 hp)
Cayman	MA1.20	12 C	C_C 00501>99999	6 Cyl / 2.9L / 195 kW (261 hp)
—
Cayman "S"	MA1.21	09 9	C_9 00501>99999	6 Cyl / 3.4L / 235 kW (315 hp)
Cayman "S"	MA1.21	10 A	C_A 00501>99999	6 Cyl / 3.4L / 235 kW (315 hp)
Cayman "S"	MA1.21	11 B	C_B 00501>99999	6 Cyl / 3.4L / 235 kW (315 hp)
Cayman "S"	MA1.21	12 C	C_C 00501>99999	6 Cyl / 3.4L / 235 kW (315 hp)
—
Cayman "R"	MA1.21	12 C	R_C 00501>99999	6 Cyl / 3.4L / 243 kW (326 hp)

981 (981c)

- 2012–2016 2.7 L (2,706 cc) 275 PS (202 kW; 271 bhp) 290 N⋅m (214 lb⋅ft) water-cooled DOHC 24-valve Boxer flat-six (VarioCam Plus) "MA1.22"
- 2012–2016 3.4 L (3,436 cc) 325 PS (239 kW; 321 bhp) 370 N⋅m (273 lb⋅ft) water-cooled DOHC 24-valve Boxer flat-six (VarioCam Plus) "MA1.23" (Cayman S)
- 2014–2016 3.4 L (3,436 cc) 340 PS (250 kW; 335 bhp) 380 N⋅m (280 lb⋅ft) water-cooled DOHC 24-valve Boxer flat-six (VarioCam Plus) "MA1.23" (Cayman GTS)
- 2015–2016 3.8 L (3,800 cc) 385 PS (283 kW; 380 bhp) 420 N⋅m (310 lb⋅ft) water-cooled DOHC 24-valve Boxer flat-six (VarioCam Plus) "MA1.24" (Cayman GT4)

Porsche 981c engines
Vehicle	Engine	MY	Engine numbers	Technical data
Cayman	MA1.22	13 D	__D 00501>60000	6 Cyl / 2.7L / 195 kW (261 hp)
Cayman	MA1.22	14 E	__E 00501>60000	6 Cyl / 2.7L / 195 kW (261 hp)
Cayman	MA1.22	15 F	__F 00501>60000	6 Cyl / 2.7L / 195 kW (261 hp)
—
Cayman "S"	MA1.23	13 D	__D 00501>60000	6 Cyl / 3.4L / 239 kW (321 hp)
Cayman "S"	MA1.23	14 E	__E 00501>60000	6 Cyl / 3.4L / 239 kW (321 hp)
Cayman "S"	MA1.23	15 F	__F 00501>60000	6 Cyl / 3.4L / 239 kW (321 hp)
Cayman "S"	MA1.23	16 G	__G 00501>60000	6 Cyl / 3.4L / 239 kW (321 hp)
—
Cayman GT4	MDB.XA	15 F	DBX 00501>60000	6 Cyl / 3.8L / 283 kW (380 hp)
Cayman GT4	MDB.XA	16 G	DBX 00501>60000	6 Cyl / 3.8L / 283 kW (380 hp)

Note: MA1.24 is classified as the "Remark". MDB.XA is the "Engine Type".

982 (718)

- 2016–present 2.0 L (1,988 cc) 250 PS (184 kW; 247 bhp) 310 N⋅m (229 lb⋅ft) water-cooled turbo DOHC 16-valve Boxer flat-four (VarioCam Plus) "MA2.20" (718 Cayman for Chinese market)
- 2016–present 2.0 L (1,988 cc) 300 PS (221 kW; 296 bhp) 380 N⋅m (280 lb⋅ft) water-cooled turbo DOHC 16-valve Boxer flat-four (VarioCam Plus) "MA2.20" (718 Cayman, 718 Cayman T)
- 2016–present 2.5 L (2,497 cc) 350 PS (257 kW; 345 bhp) 420 N⋅m (310 lb⋅ft) water-cooled turbo DOHC 16-valve Boxer flat-four (VarioCam Plus) "MA2.22" (718 Cayman S)
- 2017–present 2.5 L (2,497 cc) 365 PS (268 kW; 360 bhp) 430 N⋅m (317 lb⋅ft) water-cooled turbo DOHC 16-valve Boxer flat-four (VarioCam Plus) "MA2.22" (718 Cayman GTS)
- 2019–present 4.0 L (3,995 cc) 420 PS (309 kW; 414 bhp) 420 N⋅m (310 lb⋅ft) water-cooled DOHC 24-valve Boxer flat-six (VarioCam Plus) (718 Cayman GT4)
- 2020–present 4.0 L (3,995 cc) 400 PS (294 kW; 395 bhp) 420 N⋅m (310 lb⋅ft) water-cooled DOHC 24-valve Boxer flat-six (VarioCam Plus) (718 Cayman GTS 4.0)

Porsche 982 engines
Vehicle	Engine	MY	Engine numbers	Technical data
Cayman CN	MDD.PA	17 H	DDP 501>060000	4 Cyl / 2.0L / 184 kW (247 hp)
Cayman CN	MDD.PA	18 J	DDP 501>060000	4 Cyl / 2.0L / 184 kW (247 hp)
Cayman	MDD.PB	17 H	DDP 501>060000	4 Cyl / 2.0L / 220 kW (295 hp)
Cayman	MDD.PB	18 J	DDP 501>060000	4 Cyl / 2.0L / 220 kW (295 hp)
Cayman C33	MDD.P	18 1	DDP 501>060000	4 Cyl / 2.0L / 220 kW (295 hp)
—
Cayman "S"	MDD.NC	17 H	DDN 501>060000	4 Cyl / 2.5L / 257 kW (345 hp)
Cayman S/GTS	MDD.NC	18 J	DDN 501>060000	4 Cyl / 2.5L / 257 kW (345 hp)
Cayman S/GTS C33	MDD.N	18 J	DDN 501>060000	4 Cyl / 2.5L / 257 kW (345 hp)

Note: MA2.20, MA2.22 are classified as the "Remark". MDD.PA, MDD.PB, MDD.P, MDD.NC, MDD.N are the "Engine Type".

=== Porsche Cayenne (9PA/92A/9Y0/9YA) ===
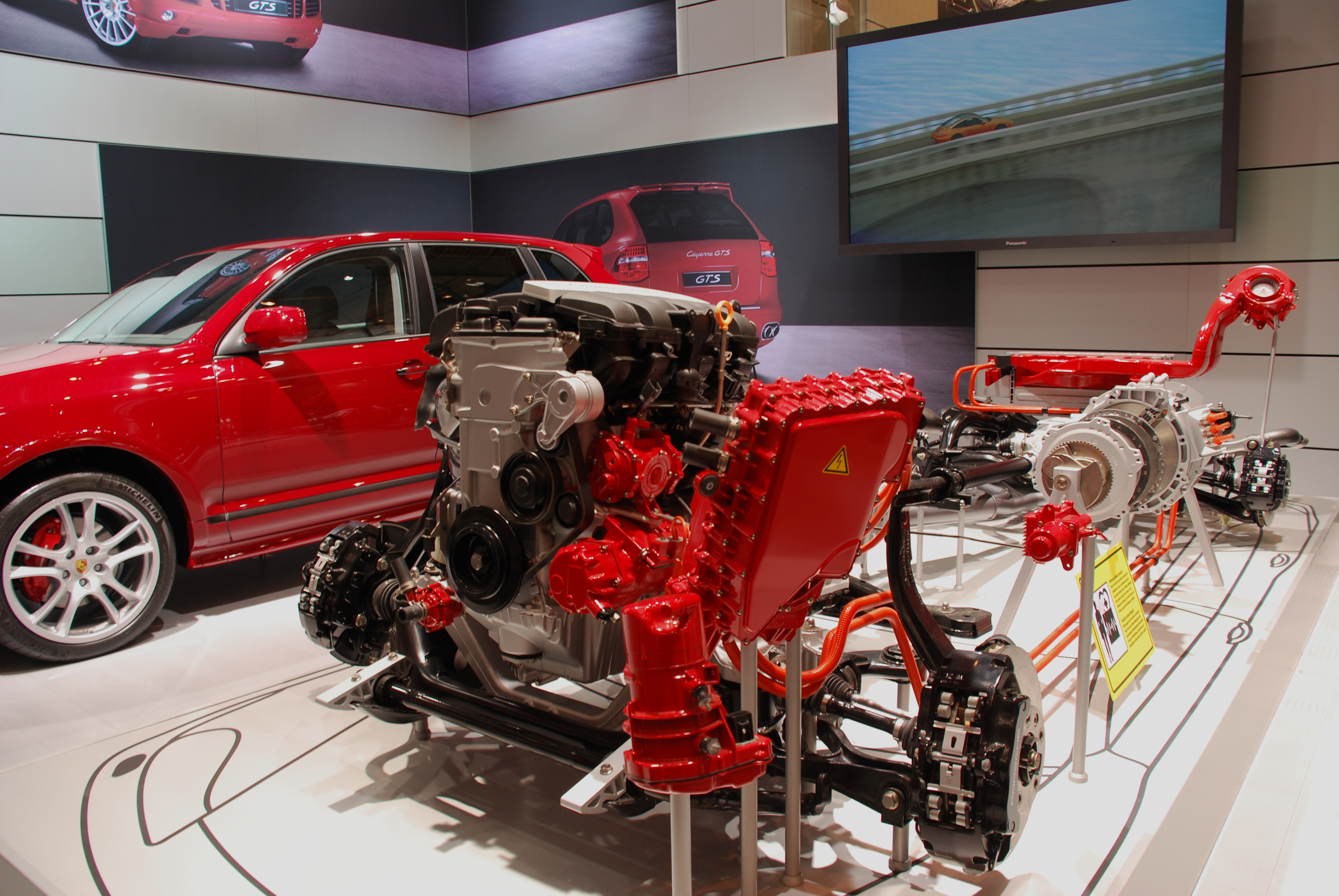
Cayenne hybrid drivetrain

9PA/E1/955

- 2004–2007 3.2 L (3,189 cc) 184 kW (250 PS; 247 bhp) (at 6,000 rpm) 310 N⋅m (229 lb⋅ft) (at 2,500–5,500 rpm) VR6 (Cayenne)
- 2003–2007 4.5 L (4,511 cc) 250 kW (340 PS; 335 bhp) (at 6,000 rpm) 420 N⋅m (310 lb⋅ft) (at 2,500–5,500 rpm) V8 (Cayenne S)
- 2003–2007 4.5 L (4,511 cc) 331 kW (450 PS; 444 bhp) (at 6,000 rpm) 620 N⋅m (457 lb⋅ft) (at 2,250–4,750 rpm) V8 (Cayenne Turbo)
- 2005–2007 4.5 L (4,511 cc) 368 kW (500 PS; 493 bhp) (at 6,000 rpm) 700 N⋅m (516 lb⋅ft) (at 2,250–4,500 rpm) V8 (Cayenne Turbo Performancekit WLS)
- 2006–2007 4.5 L (4,511 cc) 383 kW (521 PS; 514 bhp) (at 5,500 rpm) 720 N⋅m (531 lb⋅ft) (at 2,750–3,750 rpm) V8 (Cayenne Turbo S)

Porsche 9PA/E1/955 engines
Vehicle	Engine	MY	Engine numbers	Technical data
Cayenne S	M48.00	03 3	813 00501>60000	8 Cyl / 4.5L / 250 kW (335 hp)
Cayenne Turbo	M48.50	03 3	823 00501>60000	8 Cyl / 4.5L / 331 kW (444 hp)
—
Cayenne	M02.2Y	04 4	BFD 00501>60000	6 Cyl / 3.2L / 184 kW (247 hp)
Cayenne S	M48.00	04 4	814 00501>60000	8 Cyl / 4.5L / 250 kW (335 hp)
Cayenne Turbo	M48.50	04 4	824 00501>60000	8 Cyl / 4.5L / 331 kW (444 hp)
—
Cayenne	M02.2Y	05 5	BFD 00501>60000	6 Cyl / 3.2L / 184 kW (247 hp)
Cayenne S	M48.00	05 5	815 00501>60000	8 Cyl / 4.5L / 250 kW (335 hp)
Cayenne Turbo	M48.50	05 5	825 00501>60000	8 Cyl / 4.5L / 331 kW (444 hp)
—
Cayenne	BFD M02.2Y	06 6	616 00501>60000	6 Cyl / 3.2L / 184 kW (247 hp)
Cayenne S	M48.00	06 6	816 00501>60000	8 Cyl / 4.5L / 250 kW (335 hp)
Cayenne Turbo	M48.50	06 6	826 00501>60000	8 Cyl / 4.5L / 331 kW (444 hp)

9PA/E1/957

- 2007–2010 3.6 L (3,598 cc) 213 kW (290 PS; 286 bhp) (at 6,200 rpm) 385 N⋅m (284 lb⋅ft) (at 3,000 rpm) VR6 (Cayenne)
- 2007–2010 4.8 L (4,806 cc) 283 kW (385 PS; 380 bhp) (at 6,200 rpm) 500 N⋅m (369 lb⋅ft) (at 3,500 rpm) V8 (Cayenne S)
- 2008–2010 4.8 L (4,806 cc) 298 kW (405 PS; 400 bhp) (at 6,500 rpm) 500 N⋅m (369 lb⋅ft) (at 3,500 rpm) V8 (Cayenne GTS)
- 2007–2010 4.8 L (4,806 cc) 368 kW (500 PS; 493 bhp) (at 6,000 rpm) 700 N⋅m (516 lb⋅ft) (at 4,500 rpm) V8 (Cayenne Turbo)
- 2008–2010 4.8 L (4,806 cc) 404 kW (549 PS; 542 bhp) (at 6,000 rpm) 750 N⋅m (553 lb⋅ft) (at 2,250–4,500 rpm) V8 (Cayenne Turbo S)
- 2009–2010 3.0 L (2,967 cc) 176 kW (239 PS; 236 bhp) (at 4,000–4,400 rpm) 550 N⋅m (406 lb⋅ft) (at 2,000–2,250 rpm) V6 (Cayenne Diesel)

Porsche 9PA/E1/957 engines
Vehicle	Engine	MY	Engine numbers
Cayenne S	4801	2008	838 00501>99999
Cayenne GTS	4801	2008	858 00501>99999
Cayenne Turbo	4851	2008	848 00501>99999
Cayenne Turbo +E81	4851	2008	868 00501>99999
Cayenne	5501	2008	638 01001>99999
Cayenne diesel	059D	2009	CAS 0001>999999
Cayenne S	4801	2009	__9 00501>99999
Cayenne GTS	4801	2009	G_9 00501>99999
Cayenne Turbo	4851	2009	__9 00501>99999
Cayenne Turbo +E81	4851	2009	S_9 00501>99999
Cayenne Turbo +E8A	4851	2009	T_9 00501>99999
Cayenne	5501	2009	639 01001>99999
Cayenne diesel	059D	2010	CAS 0001>999999
Cayenne S	4801	2010	__A 00501>99999
Cayenne GTS	4801	2010	G_A 00501>99999
Cayenne Turbo	4851	2010	__A 00501>99999
Cayenne Turbo +E81	4851	2010	S_A 00501>99999
Cayenne Turbo +E8A	4851	2010	T_A 00501>99999
Cayenne	5501	2010	63A 01001>99999

92A/E2/958

- 2010–2016 3.6 L (3,598 cc) 220 kW (299 PS; 295 bhp) (at 6,300 rpm) 400 N⋅m (295 lb⋅ft) (at 3,000 rpm) VR6 (Cayenne)
- 2010–2014 4.8 L (4,806 cc) 294 kW (400 PS; 394 bhp) (at 6,500 rpm) 500 N⋅m (369 lb⋅ft) (at 3,500 rpm) V8 (Cayenne S)
- 2014–2017 3.6 L (3,604 cc) 309 kW (420 PS; 414 bhp) (at 6,000 rpm) 550 N⋅m (406 lb⋅ft) (at 1,350–4,500 rpm) biturbo V6 (Cayenne S)
- 2010–2014 3.0 L (2,995 cc) 245 kW (333 PS; 329 bhp) supercharged V6 (Cayenne S Hybrid)
- 2014–2017 3.0 L (2,995 cc) 272 kW (370 PS; 365 bhp) supercharged V6 (Cayenne S E-Hybrid)
- 2012–2015 4.8 L (4,806 cc) 309 kW (420 PS; 414 bhp) (at 6,500 rpm) 515 N⋅m (380 lb⋅ft) (at 3,500 rpm) V8 (Cayenne GTS)
- 2015–2017 3.6 L (3,604 cc) 324 kW (441 PS; 434 bhp) (at 6,000 rpm) 600 N⋅m (443 lb⋅ft) (at 1,600–5,000 rpm) biturbo V6 (Cayenne GTS)
- 2010–2014 4.8 L (4,806 cc) 368 kW (500 PS; 493 bhp) (at 6,000 rpm) 700 N⋅m (516 lb⋅ft) (at 2,250–4,500 rpm) biturbo V8 (Cayenne Turbo)
- 2014–2017 4.8 L (4,806 cc) 382 kW (519 PS; 512 bhp) (at 6,000 rpm) 750 N⋅m (553 lb⋅ft) (at 2,250–4,000 rpm) biturbo V8 (Cayenne Turbo)
- 2013–2015 4.8 L (4,806 cc) 405 kW (551 PS; 543 bhp) (at 6,000 rpm) 750 N⋅m (553 lb⋅ft) (at 2,250–4,500 rpm) biturbo V8 (Cayenne Turbo S)
- 2015–2017 4.8 L (4,806 cc) 419 kW (570 PS; 562 bhp) (at 6,000 rpm) 800 N⋅m (590 lb⋅ft) (at 2,500–4,000 rpm) biturbo V8 (Cayenne Turbo S)
- 2010–2018 3.0 L (2,967 cc) 176 kW (239 PS; 236 bhp) (at 3,800–4,400 rpm) 550 N⋅m (406 lb⋅ft) (at 1,750–2,750 rpm) turbo V6 (Cayenne Diesel)
- 2015–2018 3.0 L (2,967 cc) 193 kW (262 PS; 259 bhp) (at 4,000 rpm) 580 N⋅m (428 lb⋅ft) (at 1,750–2,500 rpm) turbo V6 (Cayenne Diesel)
- 2012–2014 4.1 L (4,134 cc) 281 kW (382 PS; 377 bhp) (at 3,750 rpm) 850 N⋅m (627 lb⋅ft) (at 2,000–2,750 rpm) turbo V8 (Cayenne S Diesel)
- 2014–2018 4.1 L (4,134 cc) 283 kW (385 PS; 380 bhp) (at 3,750 rpm) 850 N⋅m (627 lb⋅ft) (at 2,000–2,750 rpm) turbo V8 (Cayenne S Diesel)

Porsche 92A/E2/958 engines
Vehicle	Engine	MY	Engine numbers
Cayenne diesel	059E	2011	CAS 0001>999999
Cayenne CHINA ID11	06EC	2011	__B 00501>99999
Cayenne hybrid	06EC	2011	__B 00501>99999
Cayenne S	4802	2011	__B 00501>59999
Cayenne S I1A5	4802	2011	_VB 00501>59999
Cayenne Turbo	4852	2011	__B 00501>99999
Cayenne	5502	2011	__B 01001>99999
Cayenne hybrid (C33)	CGE	2012	CGE 0001>999999
Cayenne hybrid	CGEA	2012	CGE 0001>999999
Cayenne hybrid I553	CGFA	2012	CGF 0001>999999
Cayenne CHINA ID11	CJT	2012	CJT 0001>999999
Cayenne diesel (C33)	CRC	2012	CRC 0001>999999
Cayenne diesel	CRCA	2012	CRC 0001>999999
Cayenne diesel (C22/C20)	CRCB	2012	CRC 0001>999999
Cayenne S	4802	2012	__C 00501>99999
Cayenne S I1A5	4802	2012	_VC 00501>99999
Cayenne Turbo	4852	2012	__C 00501>99999
Cayenne Turbo kit (IE81)	4852	2012	S_C 00501>99999
Cayenne	5502	2012	__C 01001>99999
Cayenne hybrid (C33)	CGE	2013	CGE 0001>999999
Cayenne hybrid	CGEA	2013	CGE 0001>999999
Cayenne hybrid I553	CGFA	2013	CGF 0001>999999
Cayenne CHINA ID11	CJT	2013	CJT 0001>999999
Cayenne CHINA ID11	CJTB	2013	CJT 0001>999999
Cayenne diesel (USA.CDN)	CNRB	2013	CNR 0001>999999
Cayenne diesel (C33)	CRC	2013	CRC 0001>999999
Cayenne diesel	CRCA	2013	CRC 0001>999999
Cayenne diesel (C22/C20)	CRCB	2013	CRC 0001>999999
Cayenne V8 diesel (IDD8)	CUDB	2013	CUD 0001>999999
Cayenne S	4802	2013	__D 00501>99999
Cayenne S I1A5	4802	2013	_VD 00501>99999
Cayenne GTS	4802	2013	G_D 00501>99999
Cayenne GTS I1A5	4802	2013	GVD 00501>99999
Cayenne Turbo	4852	2013	__D 00501>99999
Cayenne Turbo kit (IE81)	4852	2013	S_D 00501>99999
Cayenne	5502	2013	__D 01001>99999
Cayenne hybrid (C33)	CGE	2014	CGE 0001>999999
Cayenne hybrid	CGEA	2014	CGE 0001>999999
Cayenne hybrid I553	CGFA	2014	CGF 0001>999999
Cayenne CHINA ID11	CJT	2014	CJT 0001>999999
Cayenne diesel (USA.CDN)	CNRB	2014	CNR 0001>999999
Cayenne diesel (C33)	CRC	2014	CRC 0001>999999
Cayenne diesel	CRCA	2014	CRC 0001>999999
Cayenne diesel (C22/C20)	CRCB	2014	CRC 0001>999999
Cayenne V8 diesel (IDD8)	CUDB	2014	CUD 0001>999999
Cayenne S	4802	2014	__E 00501>99999
Cayenne S I1A5	4802	2014	_VE 00501>99999
Cayenne GTS	4802	2014	G_E 00501>99999
Cayenne GTS I1A5	4802	2014	GVE 00501>99999
Cayenne Turbo	4852	2014	__E 00501>99999
Cayenne Turbo kit (IE81)	4852	2014	S_E 00501>99999
Cayenne Turbo S (IE8A)	4852	2014	T_E 00501>99999
Cayenne	5502	2014	__E 01001>99999
Cayenne	CEYA	2015	CEY 0001>999999
Cayenne V8 Turbo	CFTB	2015	CFT 0501>999999
Cayenne hybrid (C33)	CGE	2015	CGE 0001>999999
Cayenne hybrid	CGEA	2015	CGE 0001>999999
Cayenne hybrid I553	CGFA	2015	CGF 0001>999999
Cayenne CHINA ID11	CJT	2015	CJT 0001>999999
Cayenne diesel (USA.CDN)	CNRB	2015	CNR 0001>999999
Cayenne V8 diesel (IDD8)	CUDC	2015	CUD 0001>999999
Cayenne V6 Turbo	CURA	2015	CUR 0501>999999
Cayenne diesel	CVVA	2015	CVV 0001>999999
Cayenne diesel (C07)	CVVB	2015	CVV 0001>999999
Cayenne diesel (C22)	CVVC	2015	CVV 0001>999999
Cayenne V6 Turbo GTS	CXZA	2015	CXZ 0501>999999
Cayenne	CEYA	2016	CEY 0001>999999
Cayenne V8 Turbo	CFTB	2016	CFT 0501>999999
Cayenne hybrid (C33)	CGE	2016	CGE 0001>999999
Cayenne hybrid	CGEA	2016	CGE 0001>999999
Cayenne hybrid I553	CGFA	2016	CGF 0001>999999
Cayenne CHINA ID11	CJT	2016	CJT 0001>999999
Cayenne diesel (USA.CDN)	CNRB	2016	CNR 0001>999999
Cayenne V8 diesel (IDD8)	CUDC	2016	CUD 0001>999999
Cayenne V6 Turbo	CURA	2016	CUR 0501>999999
Cayenne diesel	CVVA	2016	CVV 0001>999999
Cayenne diesel (C07)	CVVB	2016	CVV 0001>999999
Cayenne diesel (C22)	CVVC	2016	CVV 0001>999999
Cayenne V6 Turbo GTS	CXZA	2016	CXZ 0501>999999
Cayenne V8 Turbo S	CYXA	2016	CYX 0501>999999
Cayenne	CEYA	2017	CEY 0001>999999
Cayenne V8 Bi-Turbo	CFTB	2017	CFT 0501>999999
Cayenne hybrid (C33)	CGE	2017	CGE 0001>999999
Cayenne hybrid	CGEA	2017	CGE 0001>999999
Cayenne hybrid I553	CGFA	2017	CGF 0001>999999
Cayenne CHN VNM ID11	CJT	2017	CJT 0001>999999
Cayenne diesel (USA.CDN)	CNRB	2017	CNR 0001>999999
Cayenne diesel	CRCA	2017	CRC 0001>999999
Cayenne V8 diesel (IDD8)	CUDC	2017	CUD 0001>999999
Cayenne V6 Bi-Turbo	CURA	2017	CUR 0501>999999
Cayenne diesel	CVVA	2017	CVV 0001>999999
Cayenne diesel (C07)	CVVB	2017	CVV 0001>999999
Cayenne diesel (C22)	CVVC	2017	CVV 0001>999999
Cayenne V6 Bi-Turbo GTS	CXZA	2017	CXZ 0501>999999
Cayenne V8 Bi-Turbo S	CYXA	2017	CYX 0501>999999
Cayenne	CEYA	2018	CEY 0001>999999
Cayenne V8 Bi-Turbo (C33)	CFT	2018	CFT 0501>999999
Cayenne V8 Bi-Turbo	CFTB	2018	CFT 0501>999999
Cayenne hybrid (C33)	CGE	2018	CGE 0001>999999
Cayenne hybrid	CGEA	2018	CGE 0001>999999
Cayenne hybrid I553	CGFA	2018	CGF 0001>999999
Cayenne CHN VNM ID11	CJT	2018	CJT 0001>999999
Cayenne diesel (USA.CDN)	CNRB	2018	CNR 0001>999999
Cayenne diesel	CRCA	2018	CRC 0001>999999
Cayenne V8 diesel (IDD8)	CUDC	2018	CUD 0001>999999
Cayenne V6 Bi-Turbo C33)	CUR	2018	CUR 0501>999999
Cayenne V6 Bi-Turbo	CURA	2018	CUR 0501>999999
Cayenne diesel	CVVA	2018	CVV 0001>999999
Cayenne diesel (C07)	CVVB	2018	CVV 0001>999999
Cayenne diesel (C22)	CVVC	2018	CVV 0001>999999
Cayenne V6 Bi-Turbo GTS	CXZA	2018	CXZ 0501>999999
Cayenne V6 Bi-Turbo GTS C33)	CXZA	2018	CXZ 0501>999999
Cayenne V8 Bi-Turbo S	CYXA	2018	CYX 0501>999999
Cayenne V8 Bi-Turbo S C33)	CYXA	2018	CYX 0501>999999

9Y0/9YA/9YB/PO536

- 2017–present 3.0 L (2,995 cc) 250 kW (340 PS; 335 bhp) (at 5,300–6,400 rpm) 450 N⋅m (332 lb⋅ft) (at 1,350–5,300 rpm) EA839 water-cooled turbo DOHC 24-valve V6 (VarioCam Plus) (Cayenne, Cayenne Coupé, Cayenne E-Hybrid, Cayenne Coupé E-Hybrid)
- 2017–present 2.9 L (2,894 cc) 324 kW (441 PS; 434 bhp) (at 5,700–6,600 rpm) 550 N⋅m (406 lb⋅ft) (at 1,800–5,500 rpm) EA839 water-cooled biturbo DOHC 24-valve V6 (VarioCam Plus) (Cayenne S)
- 2017–2018 4.0 L (3,996 cc) 404 kW (549 PS; 542 bhp) (at 5,750–6,000 rpm) 770 N⋅m (568 lb⋅ft) (at 1,960–4,500 rpm) EA825 water-cooled biturbo DOHC 32-valve V8 (VarioCam Plus) (Cayenne Turbo)
- 2019–present 4.0 L (3,996 cc) 404 kW (549 PS; 542 bhp) (at 5,750–6,000 rpm) 770 N⋅m (568 lb⋅ft) (at 2,000–4,500 rpm) EA825 water-cooled biturbo DOHC 32-valve V8 (VarioCam Plus) (Cayenne Turbo, Cayenne Coupé Turbo, Cayenne Turbo S E-Hybrid, Cayenne Coupé Turbo S E-Hybrid)

=== Porsche Macan (95B) ===
95B

- 2014–2018 2.0 L (1,984 cc) 174 kW (237 PS; 233 bhp) (at 5000–6800 rpm) 350 N⋅m (258 lb⋅ft) (at 1450–4500 rpm) VW EA888 turbo inline four-cylinder
- 2016–2018 2.0 L (1,984 cc) 185 kW (252 PS; 248 bhp) (at 5000–6800 rpm) 370 N⋅m (273 lb⋅ft) (at 1600–4500 rpm) VW EA888 turbo inline four-cylinder
- 2014–2018 3.0 L (2,997 cc) 250 kW (340 PS; 335 bhp) (at 5500–6500 rpm) 460 N⋅m (339 lb⋅ft) (at 1450–5000 rpm) turbo V6 (Macan S)
- 2015–2018 3.0 L (2,997 cc) 265 kW (360 PS; 355 bhp) (at 6000 rpm) 500 N⋅m (369 lb⋅ft) (at 1650–4000 rpm) turbo V6 (Macan GTS)
- 2014–2018 3.6 L (3,604 cc) 294 kW (400 PS; 394 bhp) (at 6000 rpm) 550 N⋅m (406 lb⋅ft) (at 1350–4500 rpm) turbo V6 (Macan Turbo)
- 2016–2018 3.6 L (3,604 cc) 324 kW (441 PS; 434 bhp) (at 6000 rpm) 600 N⋅m (443 lb⋅ft) (at 1500–4500 rpm) turbo V6 (Macan Turbo with Performance Package)
- 2014–2018 3.0 L (2,967 cc) 155 kW (211 PS; 208 bhp) (at 2750–4000 rpm) 580 N⋅m (428 lb⋅ft) (at 1750–2500 rpm) turbo V6 (Macan S Diesel)
- 2014–2018 3.0 L (2,967 cc) 184 kW (250 PS; 247 bhp) (at 3500–4600 rpm) 580 N⋅m (428 lb⋅ft) (at 1750–2500 rpm) turbo V6 (Macan S Diesel)
- 2014–2018 3.0 L (2,967 cc) 190 kW (258 PS; 255 bhp) (at 4000–4250 rpm) 580 N⋅m (428 lb⋅ft) (at 1750–2500 rpm) turbo V6 (Macan S Diesel)

95B II

- 2018–present 2.0 L (1,984 cc) 180 kW (245 PS; 241 bhp) (at 5000–6750 rpm) 370 N⋅m (273 lb⋅ft) (at 1600–4500 rpm) VW EA888 turbo inline four-cylinder
- 2018–present 3.0 L (2,995 cc) 260 kW (354 PS; 349 bhp) (at 5400–6400 rpm) 480 N⋅m (354 lb⋅ft) (at 1360–4800 rpm) VW EA839 turbo V6 (Macan S)
- 2019–present 2.9 L (2,894 cc) 280 kW (381 PS; 375 bhp) (at 5200–6700 rpm) 520 N⋅m (384 lb⋅ft) (at 1750–5000 rpm) VW EA839 bi-turbo V6 (Macan GTS)
- 2019–present 2.9 L (2,894 cc) 324 kW (441 PS; 434 bhp) (at 5700–6600 rpm) 550 N⋅m (406 lb⋅ft) (at 1800–5600 rpm) VW EA839 bi-turbo V6 (Macan Turbo)

Porsche 95B/95B II engines
Vehicle	Engine	MY	Engine numbers
Macan V6 TDI	CDUD	2014	CDU 0001>999999
Macan V6 TDI	CTBA	2014	CTB 0001>999999
Macan V6 TDI	CTBB	2014	CTB 0001>999999
Macan V6 TDI	CTBC	2014	CTB 0001>999999
Macan Turbo	CTLA	2014	CTL 0001>999999
Macan S	CTMA	2014	CTM 0001>999999
Macan V6 TDI	CDUD	2015	CDU 0001>999999
Macan (C33)	CNC	2015	CNC 0001>999999
Macan	CNCC	2015	CNC 0001>999999
Macan V6 TDI	CTBA	2015	CTB 0001>999999
Macan V6 TDI	CTBB	2015	CTB 0001>999999
Macan V6 TDI	CTBC	2015	CTB 0001>999999
Macan Turbo	CTLA	2015	CTL 0001>999999
Macan S	CTMA	2015	CTM 0001>999999
Macan C39 (KOR)	CYNA	2015	CYN 0001>999999
Macan V6 TDI	CDUD	2016	CDU 0001>999999
Macan (C33)	CNC	2016	CNC 0001>999999
Macan	CNCC	2016	CNC 0001>999999
Macan V6 TDI	CNRB	2016	CNR 0001>999999
Macan V6 TDI BiN5	CPNB	2016	CPN 0001>999999
Macan V6 TDI	CTBA	2016	CTB 0001>999999
Macan V6 TDI	CTBB	2016	CTB 0001>999999
Macan V6 TDI	CTBC	2016	CTB 0001>999999
Macan Turbo	CTLA	2016	CTL 0001>999999
Macan S	CTMA	2016	CTM 0001>999999
Macan C39 (KOR)	CYNA	2016	CYN 0001>999999
Macan R4 TFSI (USA)	CYNB	2016	CYN 0001>999999
Macan R4 TFSI	CYPA	2016	CYP 0001>999999
Macan Bi-Turbo GTS	DCNA	2016	DCN 0001>999999
Macan V6 TDI	CDUD	2017	CDU 0001>999999
Macan (C33)	CNC	2017	CNC 0001>999999
Macan	CNCC	2017	CNC 0001>999999
Macan V6 TDI	CNRB	2017	CNR 0001>999999
Macan V6 TDI BiN5	CPNB	2017	CPN 0001>999999
Macan V6 TDI	CTBA	2017	CTB 0001>999999
Macan V6 TDI	CTBB	2017	CTB 0001>999999
Macan V6 TDI	CTBC	2017	CTB 0001>999999
Macan Turbo	CTLA	2017	CTL 0001>999999
Macan S	CTMA	2017	CTM 0001>999999
Macan C39 (KOR)	CYNA	2017	CYN 0001>999999
Macan R4 TFSI (USA)	CYNB	2017	CYN 0001>999999
Macan R4 TFSI	CYPA	2017	CYP 0001>999999
Macan Bi-Turbo GTS C33	DCN	2017	DCN 0001>999999
Macan Bi-Turbo GTS	DCNA	2017	DCN 0001>999999
Macan Turbo kit C33	DHK	2017	DHK 0001>999999
Macan Turbo kit	DHKA	2017	DHK 0001>999999
Macan V6 TDI	CDUD	2018	CDU 0001>999999
Macan (C33)	CNC	2018	CNC 0001>999999
Macan	CNCC	2018	CNC 0001>999999
Macan V6 TDI	CNRB	2018	CNR 0001>999999
Macan V6 TDI	CTBA	2018	CTB 0001>999999
Macan V6 TDI	CTBB	2018	CTB 0001>999999
Macan V6 TDI	CTBC	2018	CTB 0001>999999
Macan Turbo C33	CTL	2018	CTL 0001>999999
Macan Turbo	CTLA	2018	CTL 0001>999999
Macan S C33	CTM	2018	CTM 0001>999999
Macan S	CTMA	2018	CTM 0001>999999
Macan C39 (KOR)	CYNA	2018	CYN 0001>999999
Macan R4 TFSI (USA)	CYNB	2018	CYN 0001>999999
Macan R4 TFSI C33	CYP	2018	CYP 0001>999999
Macan R4 TFSI	CYPA	2018	CYP 0001>999999
Macan Bi-Turbo GTS C33	DCN	2018	DCN 0001>999999
Macan Bi-Turbo GTS	DCNA	2018	DCN 0001>999999
Macan Turbo kit C33	DHK	2018	DHK 0001>999999
Macan Turbo kit	DHKA	2018	DHK 0001>999999
Macan R4 TFSI C33	DLH	2018	DHK 0001>999999
Macan R4 TFSI C33	DLHB	2018	DHK 0001>999999

=== Porsche Panamera (970/971) ===
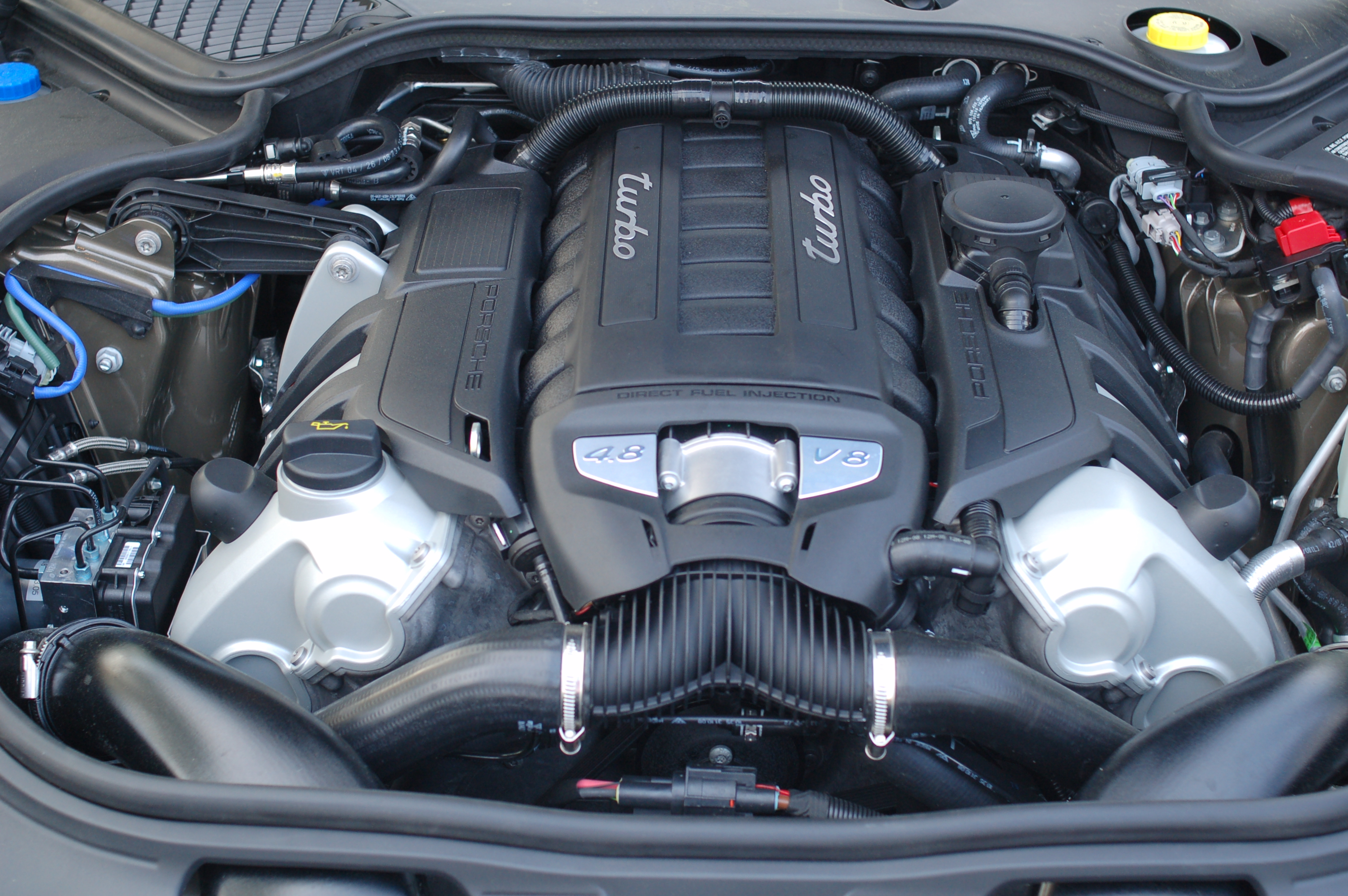
Panamera Turbo: 4.8L V8 twin turbo

970

- 2010–2013 3.6 L (3,605 cc) 300 PS (221 kW; 296 bhp) (at 6,200 rpm) 400 N⋅m (295 lb⋅ft) (at 4,250 rpm) water-cooled DOHC 24-valve V6 (VarioCam Plus)
- 2009–2013 4.8 L (4,806 cc) 400 PS (294 kW; 395 bhp) (at 6,500 rpm) 500 N⋅m (369 lb⋅ft) (at 3,500–5,000 rpm) water-cooled DOHC 32-valve V8 (VarioCam Plus) (Panamera S/4S)
- 2011–2013 3.0 L (2,995 cc) 380 PS (279 kW; 375 bhp) (at 5,500 rpm) 580 N⋅m (428 lb⋅ft) (at 1,750–5,250 rpm) water-cooled supercharged DOHC 24-valve V6 (Panamera S Hybrid)
- 2009–2013 4.8 L (4,806 cc) 430 PS (316 kW; 424 bhp) (at 6,700 rpm) 520 N⋅m (384 lb⋅ft) (at 3,500 rpm) water-cooled DOHC 32-valve V8 (VarioCam Plus) (Panamera GTS)
- 2009–2013 4.8 L (4,806 cc) 500 PS (368 kW; 493 bhp) (at 6,000 rpm) 700 N⋅m (516 lb⋅ft) (at 2,250–4,500 rpm) water-cooled biturbo DOHC 32-valve V8 (VarioCam Plus) (Panamera Turbo)
- 2011–2013 4.8 L (4,806 cc) 550 PS (405 kW; 542 bhp) (at 6,000 rpm) 750 N⋅m (553 lb⋅ft) (at 2,500–4,000 rpm) water-cooled biturbo DOHC 32-valve V8 (VarioCam Plus) (Panamera Turbo S)
- 2011–2013 3.0 L (2,967 cc) 250 PS (184 kW; 247 bhp) (at 3,800–4,000 rpm) 550 N⋅m (406 lb⋅ft) (at 1,750–2,750 rpm) water-cooled DOHC 24-valve V6 (Panamera Diesel)
- 2013–2016 3.6 L (3,605 cc) 310 PS (228 kW; 306 bhp) (at 6,200 rpm) 400 N⋅m (295 lb⋅ft) (at 3,750 rpm) water-cooled DOHC 24-valve V6 (VarioCam Plus)
- 2013–2016 3.0 L (2,997 cc) 420 PS (309 kW; 414 bhp) (at 6,000 rpm) 520 N⋅m (384 lb⋅ft) (at 1,750–5,000 rpm) water-cooled biturbo DOHC 24-valve V6 (VarioCam Plus) (Panamera S/4S/4S Executive)
- 2013–2016 3.0 L (2,995 cc) 416 PS (306 kW; 410 bhp) (at 5,500 rpm) 590 N⋅m (435 lb⋅ft) (at 1,750–5,250 rpm) water-cooled supercharged DOHC 24-valve V6 (Panamera S E-hybrid)
- 2013–2016 4.8 L (4,806 cc) 440 PS (324 kW; 434 bhp) (at 6,700 rpm) 520 N⋅m (384 lb⋅ft) (at 3,500 rpm) water-cooled DOHC 32-valve V8 (VarioCam Plus) (Panamera GTS)
- 2013–2016 4.8 L (4,806 cc) 520 PS (382 kW; 513 bhp) (at 6,000 rpm) 700–770 N⋅m (516–568 lb⋅ft) (at 2,250–4,500 rpm) water-cooled biturbo DOHC 32-valve V8 (VarioCam Plus) (Panamera Turbo/Turbo Executive)
- 2013–2016 4.8 L (4,806 cc) 570 PS (419 kW; 562 bhp) (at 6,000 rpm) 750–800 N⋅m (553–590 lb⋅ft) (at 2,250–5,000 rpm) water-cooled biturbo DOHC 32-valve V8 (VarioCam Plus) (Panamera Turbo S/Turbo S Executive)
- 2013–2015 3.0 L (2,967 cc) 300 PS (221 kW; 296 bhp) (at 3,800–4,000 rpm) 650 N⋅m (479 lb⋅ft) (at 1,750–2,750 rpm) water-cooled DOHC 24-valve V6 (Panamera Diesel)

Porsche 970 engines
Vehicle	Engine	MY	Engine numbers
Panamera S I338	4820	2010	__A 00501>99999
Panamera S I339	4840	2010	__A 00501>99999
Panamera Turbo I339	4870	2010	__A 00501>99999
Panamera I338	4620	2011	__B 00501>59999
Panamera I338 I145	4620	2011	_VB 00501>59999
Panamera I339	4640	2011	__B 00501>59999
Panamera I339 I145	4640	2011	_VB 00501>59999
Panamera S I338	4820	2011	__B 00501>59999
Panamera S I339	4840	2011	__B 00501>59999
Panamera Turbo I339	4870	2011	__B 00501>59999
Panamera hybrid (C33)	CGE	2012	CGE 0001>999999
Panamera hybrid	CGEA	2012	CGE 0001>999999
Panamera hybrid I553	CGFA	2012	CGF 0001>999999
Panamera diesel (C33)	CRC	2012	CRC 0001>999999
Panamera diesel (C22/C20)	CRCB	2012	CRC 0001>999999
Panamera diesel	CRCC	2012	CRC 0001>999999
Panamera I338	4620	2012	__C 00501>60000
Panamera I338 I145	4620	2012	_VC 00501>60000
Panamera I339	4640	2012	__C 00501>60000
Panamera I339 I145	4640	2012	_VC 00501>60000
Panamera S I338	4820	2012	__C 00501>60000
Panamera S I338 I145	4820	2012	_VC 00501>60000
Panamera S I339	4840	2012	__C 00501>60000
Panamera S I339 I145	4840	2012	_VC 00501>60000
Panamera Turbo	4870	2012	__C 00501>60000
Panamera Turbo IX80	4870	2012	S_C 00501>60000
Panamera Turbo I016	4870	2012	T_C 00501>60000
Panamera hybrid (C33)	CGE	2013	CGE 0001>999999
Panamera hybrid	CGEA	2013	CGE 0001>999999
Panamera hybrid I553	CGFA	2013	CGF 0001>999999
Panamera diesel (C33)	CRC	2013	CRC 0001>999999
Panamera diesel (C22/C20)	CRCB	2013	CRC 0001>999999
Panamera diesel	CRCC	2013	CRC 0001>999999
Panamera I339	4620	2013	__D 00501>60000
Panamera I338 I145	4620	2013	_VD 00501>60000
Panamera I339	4640	2013	__D 00501>60000
Panamera I339 I145	4640	2013	_VD 00501>60000
Panamera S I338	4820	2013	__D 00501>60000
Panamera S I338 I145	4820	2013	_VD 00501>60000
Panamera S I339	4840	2013	__D 00501>60000
Panamera S I339 I145	4840	2013	_VD 00501>60000
Panamera GTS I339 I015	4840	2013	G_D 00501>60000
Panamera GTS I339 I015 I145	4840	2013	GVD 00501>60000
Panamera Turbo	4870	2013	__D 00501>60000
Panamera Turbo IX80	4870	2013	S_D 00501>60000
Panamera Turbo I016	4870	2013	T_D 00501>60000
Panamera hybrid (C33)	CGE	2014	CGE 0001>999999
Panamera hybrid	CGEA	2014	CGE 0001>999999
Panamera hybrid I553	CGFA	2014	CGF 0001>999999
Panamera diesel (C33)	CRC	2014	CRC 0001>999999
Panamera diesel (C22/C20)	CRCB	2014	CRC 0001>999999
Panamera diesel	CRCC	2014	CRC 0001>999999
Panamera	CWAA	2014	CWA 0001>999999
Panamera Turbo	CWBA	2014	CWB 0001>999999
Panamera Turbo I016	CWCA	2014	CWC 0001>999999
Panamera S I144	CWDA	2014	CWD 0001>999999
Panamera S I143 (C33)	CWF	2014	CWF 0001>999999
Panamera S I143	CWFA	2014	CWF 0001>999999
Panamera diesel	CWJA	2014	CWJ 0001>999999
Panamera I145	CXNA	2014	CXN 0001>999999
Panamera GTS I339	CXPA	2014	CXP 0001>999999
Panamera GTS I339 I145	CXRA	2014	CXR 0001>999999
Panamera hybrid (C33)	CGE	2015	CGE 0001>999999
Panamera hybrid	CGEA	2015	CGE 0001>999999
Panamera hybrid I553	CGFA	2015	CGF 0001>999999
Panamera diesel (C22/C20)	CRCB	2015	CRC 0001>999999
Panamera diesel	CRCC	2015	CRC 0001>999999
Panamera	CWAA	2015	CWA 0001>999999
Panamera Turbo	CWBA	2015	CWB 0001>999999
Panamera Turbo I016	CWCA	2015	CWC 0001>999999
Panamera S (C33) I144	CWD	2015	CWD 0001>999999
Panamera S I144	CWDA	2015	CWD 0001>999999
Panamera S (C33) I143	CWF	2015	CWF 0001>999999
Panamera diesel	CWJA	2015	CWJ 0001>999999
Panamera I145	CXNA	2015	CXN 0001>999999
Panamera GTS I339	CXPA	2015	CXP 0001>999999
Panamera GTS I339 I145	CXRA	2015	CXR 0001>999999
Panamera hybrid (C33)	CGE	2016	CGE 0001>999999
Panamera hybrid	CGEA	2016	CGE 0001>999999
Panamera hybrid I553	CGFA	2016	CGF 0001>999999
Panamera diesel (C22/C20)	CRCB	2016	CRC 0001>999999
Panamera diesel	CRCC	2016	CRC 0001>999999
Panamera	CWAA	2016	CWA 0001>999999
Panamera Turbo (C33)	CWB	2016	CWB 0001>999999
Panamera Turbo	CWBA	2016	CWB 0001>999999
Panamera Turbo I016 (C33)	CWC	2016	CWC 0001>999999
Panamera Turbo I016	CWCA	2016	CWC 0001>999999
Panamera S (C33) I144	CWD	2016	CWD 0001>999999
Panamera S I144	CWDA	2016	CWD 0001>999999
Panamera S (C33) I143	CWF	2016	CWF 0001>999999
Panamera diesel	CWJA	2016	CWJ 0001>999999
Panamera I145	CXNA	2016	CXN 0001>999999
Panamera GTS I339	CXPA	2016	CXP 0001>999999
Panamera GTS I339 I145 (C33)	CXR	2016	CXR 0001>999999
Panamera GTS I339 I145	CXRA	2016	CXR 0001>999999

971

- 2016–2018 3.0 L (2,995 cc) 330 PS (243 kW; 325 bhp) (at 5,400–6,400 rpm) 450 N⋅m (332 lb⋅ft) (at 1,340–4,900 rpm) EA839 water-cooled turbo DOHC 24-valve V6 (VarioCam Plus) (Panamera/Panamera Sport Turismo/Panamera 4/4 Sport Turismo/4 E-Hybrid/4 E-Hybrid Sport Turismo/4 Executive)
- 2016–2018 2.9 L (2,894 cc) 440 PS (324 kW; 434 bhp) (at 5,650–6,600 rpm) 550 N⋅m (406 lb⋅ft) (at 1,750–5,500 rpm) EA839 water-cooled biturbo DOHC 24-valve V6 (VarioCam Plus) (Panamera 4S/4S Sport Turismo/4S Executive)
- 2016–2018 4.0 L (3,996 cc) 550 PS (405 kW; 542 bhp) (at 5,750–6,000 rpm) 770 N⋅m (568 lb⋅ft) (at 1,960–4,500 rpm) EA825 water-cooled biturbo DOHC 32-valve V8 (VarioCam Plus) (Panamera Turbo/Turbo Sport Turismo/Turbo Executive/Turbo S E-Hybrid/Turbo S E-Hybrid Sport Turismo)
- 2016–2017 4.0 L (3,956 cc) 422 PS (310 kW; 416 bhp) (at 3,500–5,000 rpm) 850 N⋅m (627 lb⋅ft) (at 1,000–3,250 rpm) EA898 water-cooled biturbo DOHC 32-valve V8 (Panamera 4S Diesel)
- 2019–present 3.0 L (2,995 cc) 330 PS (243 kW; 325 bhp) (at 5,400–6,400 rpm) 450 N⋅m (332 lb⋅ft) (at 1,750–4,900 rpm) EA839 water-cooled turbo DOHC 24-valve V6 (VarioCam Plus) (Panamera 4/4 Sport Turismo/4 Executive/4 Edition 10 Jahre/4 Sport Turismo Edition 10 Jahre/4 E-Hybrid/4 E-Hybrid Sport Turismo/4 E-Hybrid Executive/4 E-Hybrid Edition 10 Jahre)
- 2019–present 2.9 L (2,894 cc) 440 PS (324 kW; 434 bhp) (at 5,650–6,600 rpm) 550 N⋅m (406 lb⋅ft) (at 2,000–5,500 rpm) EA839 water-cooled biturbo DOHC 24-valve V6 (VarioCam Plus) (Panamera 4S/4S Sport Turismo/4S Executive)
- 2018–present 4.0 L (3,996 cc) 460 PS (338 kW; 454 bhp) (at 6,000–6,500 rpm) 620 N⋅m (457 lb⋅ft) (at 1,800–4,500 rpm) EA825 water-cooled biturbo DOHC 32-valve V8 (VarioCam Plus) (Panamera GTS/GTS Sport Turismo)
- 2018–present 4.0 L (3,996 cc) 550 PS (405 kW; 542 bhp) (at 5,750–6,000 rpm) 770 N⋅m (568 lb⋅ft) (at 2,000–4,500 rpm) EA825 water-cooled biturbo DOHC 32-valve V8 (VarioCam Plus) (Panamera Turbo/Turbo Sport Turismo/Turbo Executive/Turbo S E-Hybrid/Turbo S E-Hybrid Sport Turismo/Turbo S E-Hybrid Executive)

Porsche 971 engines
Vehicle	Engine	MY	Engine numbers	Technical data
Panamera V6 Bi Turbo	MCS.ZA	17 H	CSZ 0001>999999	6 Cyl / 2.9L / 324 kW (434 hp)
Panamera V6 Bi Turbo C33	MCS.Z	17 HCSZ	CSZ 0001>999999	6 Cyl / 2.9L / 324 kW (434 hp)
Panamera V6 Turbo	MCX.TA	17 HCSZ	CSZ 0001>999999	6 Cyl / 3.0L / 243 kW (326 hp)
Panamera V6 Turbo C33	MCX.T	17 HCSZ	CSZ 0001>999999	6 Cyl / 3.0L / 243 kW (326 hp)
Panamera V8 diesel	MDB.UC	17 HCSZ	CSZ 0001>999999	8 Cyl / 4.0L / 310 kW (416 hp)
Panamera PHEV	MDG.PA	17 HCSZ	CSZ 0001>999999	6 Cyl / 2.9L / 243 kW (326 hp)
Panamera PHEV C33	MDG.P	17 HCSZ	CSZ 0001>999999	6 Cyl / 2.9L / 243 kW (326 hp)
Panamera V8 Bi Turbo 0K0	MCV.DA	17 H	CVD 0001>999999	8 Cyl / 4.0L / 404 kW (542 hp)
—
Panamera V6 Bi Turbo	MCS.ZA	18 J	CSZ 0001>999999	6 Cyl / 2.9L / 324 kW (434 hp)
Panamera V6 Turbo	MCX.TA	18 J	CXT 0001>999999	6 Cyl / 3.0L / 243 kW (326 hp)
Panamera V8 diesel	MDB.UC	18 J	DBU 0001>999999	8 Cyl / 4.0L / 310 kW (416 hp)
Panamera PHEV	MDG.PA	18 J	DGP 0001>999999	6 Cyl / 2.9L / 243 kW (326 hp)
Panamera V8 Bi Turbo 0K0	MCV.DA	18 J	CVD 0001>999999	8 Cyl / 4.0L / 404 kW (542 hp)
Panamera PHEV V8 Bi Turbo 0K3	MCV.DA	18 J	CVD 0001>999999	8 Cyl / 4.0L / 404 kW (542 hp)
Panamera PHEV V8 Bi Turbo 0K3	MCV.D	18 J	CVD 0001>999999	8 Cyl / 4.0L / 404 kW (542 hp)
Panamera Diesel	MDE.PA	18 J	DEP 0001>999999	6 Cyl / 3.0L / 221 kW (296 hp)
Panamera Diesel	MDE.PB	18 J	DEP 0001>999999	6 Cyl / 3.0L / 184 kW (247 hp)
Panamera Diesel	MDE.RC	18 J	DEP 0001>999999	6 Cyl / 3.0L / 155 kW (208 hp)
Panamera Diesel	MDE.RA	18 J	DEP 0001>999999	6 Cyl / 3.0L / 190 kW (255 hp)

=== Porsche RS Spyder (9R6) ===
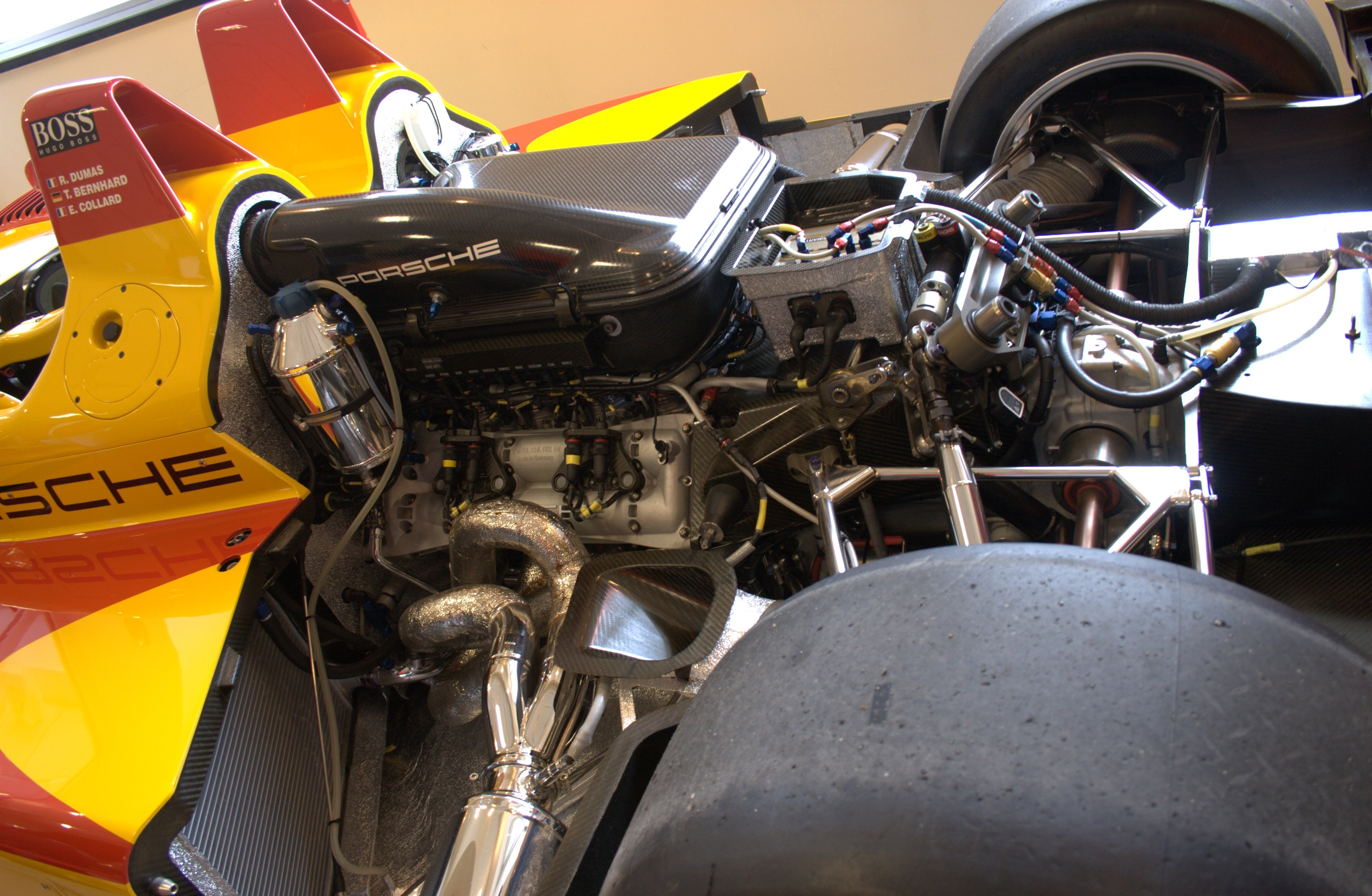
RS Spyder: 3.4L MR6 V8

- 2005–2010 3.4 L (3,397 cc) MR6, DOHC, 32-valve, 90-degree V8

=== Porsche Taycan (J1) ===
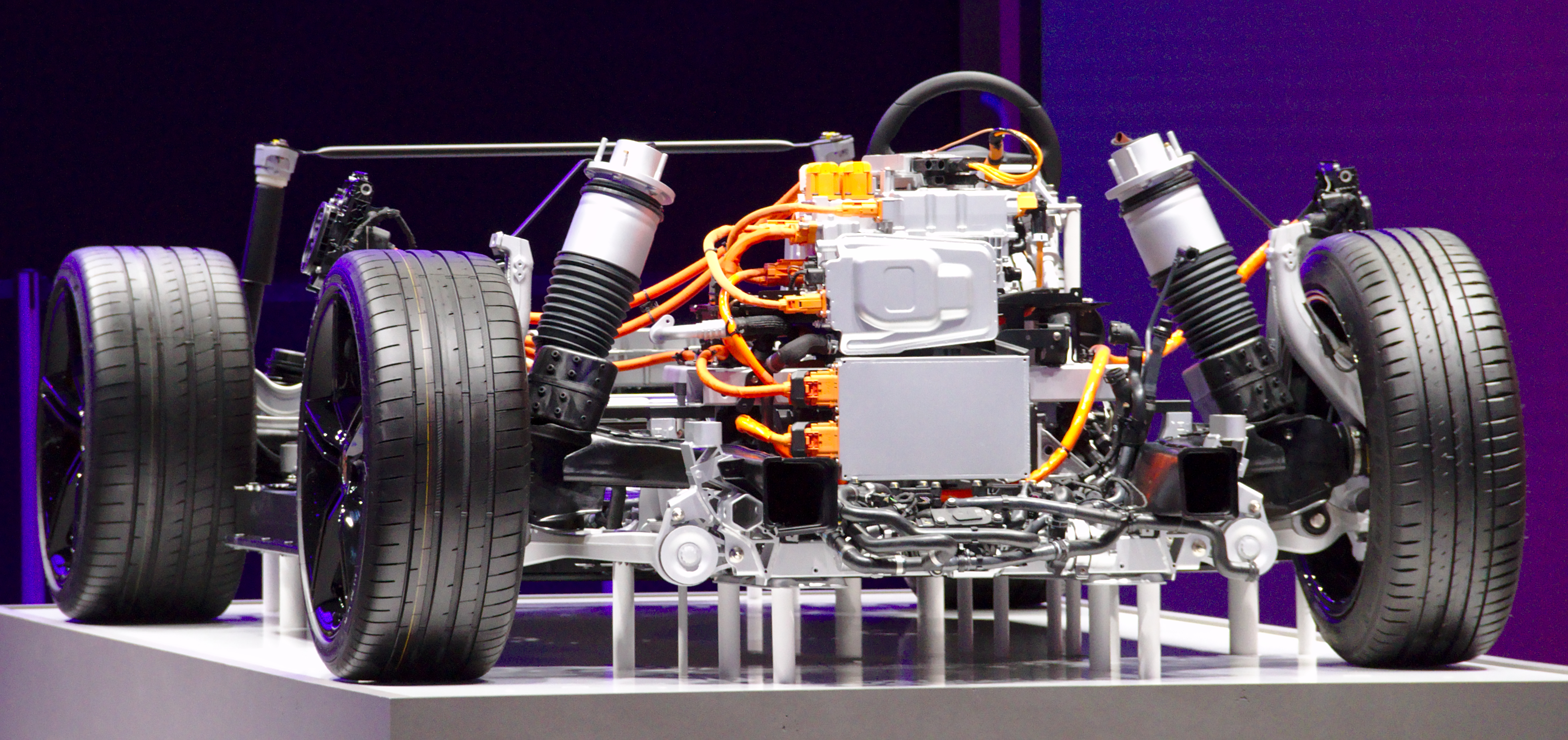
Taycan J1 platform

- 2019–present 390 kW (530 PS; 523 hp) (320 kW (435 PS; 429 hp) without launch control/overboost) 640 N⋅m (472 lb⋅ft) of two AC synchronous permanent magnet electric motors with 79.2 kWh liquid-cooled lithium-ion battery (4S)
- 2019–present 420 kW (571 PS; 563 hp) (360 kW (489 PS; 483 hp) without launch control/overboost) 650 N⋅m (479 lb⋅ft) of two AC synchronous permanent magnet electric motors with 93.4 kWh liquid-cooled lithium-ion battery (4S with Performance Battery Plus)
- 2019–present 500 kW (680 PS; 671 hp) (460 kW (625 PS; 617 hp) without launch control/overboost) 850 N⋅m (627 lb⋅ft) of two AC synchronous permanent magnet electric motors with 93.4 kWh liquid-cooled lithium-ion battery (Turbo)
- 2019–present 560 kW (761 PS; 751 hp) (460 kW (625 PS; 617 hp) without launch control/overboost) 1,050 N⋅m (774 lb⋅ft) of two AC synchronous permanent magnet electric motors with 93.4 kWh 723 V (835 V full, 610 V empty) 396 cell liquid-cooled lithium-ion battery (Turbo S)

=== Footwork Arrows A11C ===
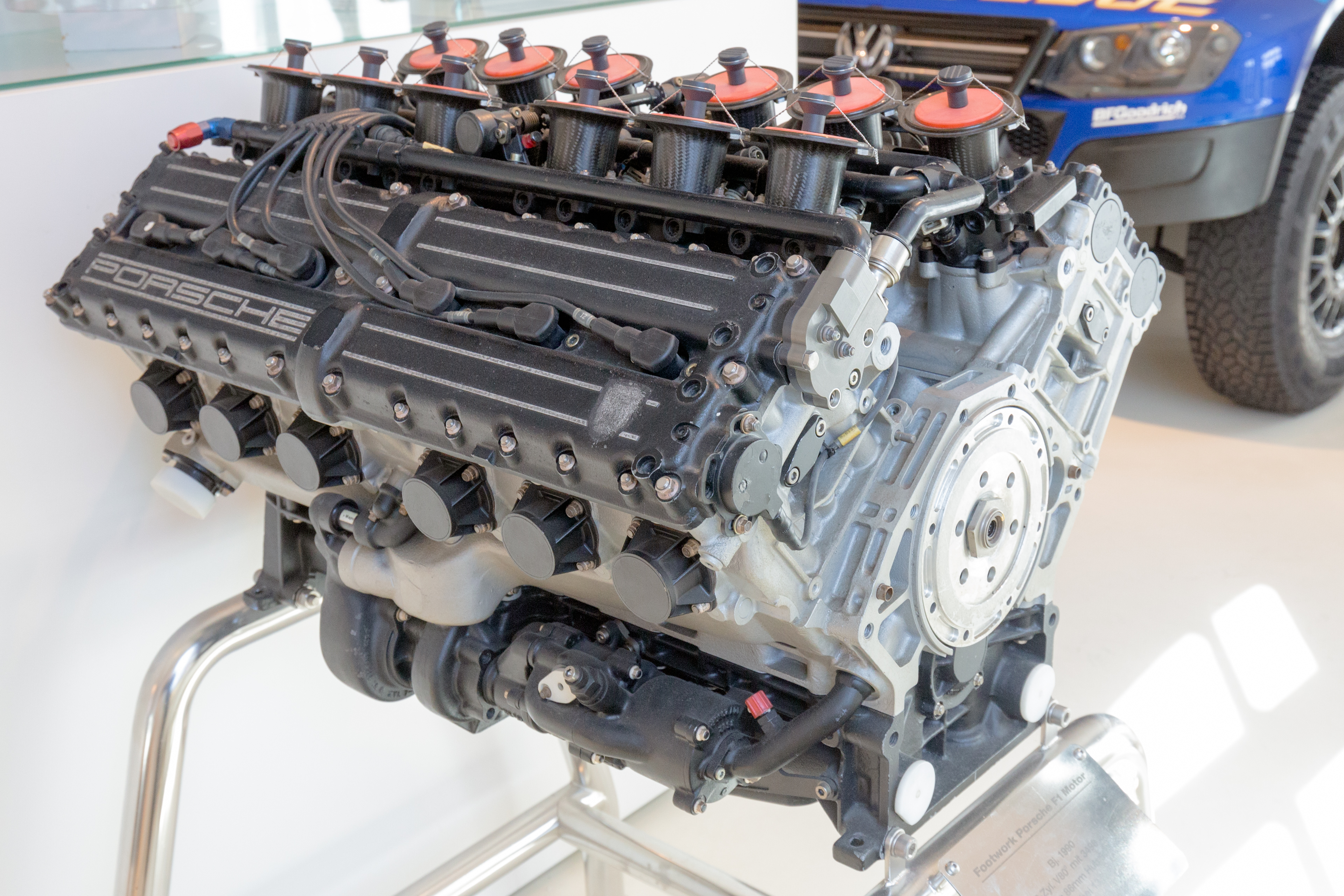
Footwork Arrows A11C: 3.5L V12

- 1991 3.5 L (3,499 cc) Porsche 3512 80° V12

=== McLaren MP4 ===
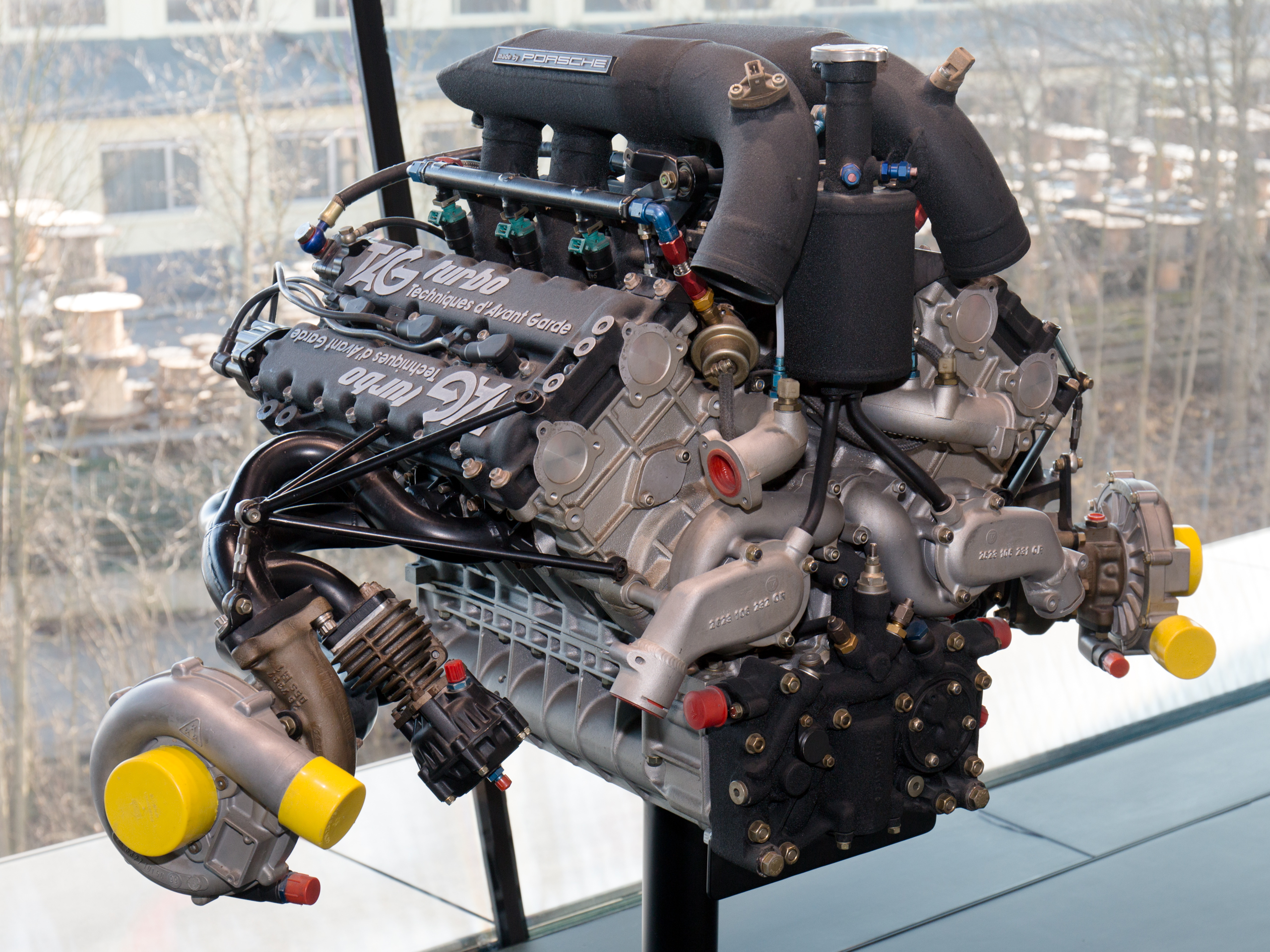
McLaren MP4/2: 1.5L V6 twin-turbo

- 1983 1.5 L (1,499 cc) TAG-Porsche TTE PO1 90° V6 (McLaren MP4/1)
- 1984–1986 1.5 L (1,499 cc) 485–597 kW (659–812 PS; 650–801 bhp) TAG-Porsche TTE PO1 90° V6 (McLaren MP4/2)
- 1987 1.5 L (1,499 cc) 480–590 kW (653–802 PS; 644–791 bhp) TAG-Porsche TTE PO1 90° V6 (McLaren MP4/3)

=== Porsche 9M0 ===
- 2.7 L (2,650 cc) 515–552 kW (700–751 PS; 691–740 bhp) March-Porsche 9M0 90° Indy V8

=== Hemi-head engines ===
Some notable hemi-head engines designed and used by Porsche in commercial production and race cars include the following:

Year	Displacement	Power	Power per Litre	Notes
1964	2.0 L	96 kW (129 hp) at 6100 rpm	65 hp (48 kW)/L	
1966	2.0 L	157 kW (211 hp)	105 hp (78 kW)/L	Carrera 6 race
1966	2.0 L	119 kW (160 hp) at 6600 rpm	80 hp (60 kW)/L	S
1970	2.2 L	134 kW (180 hp) at 6800 rpm	81 hp (60 kW)/L	S
1971	4.9 L	470 kW (630 hp)	128 hp (95 kW)/L	917 race
1973	5.4 L	820 kW (1,100 hp) at 7800 rpm	203 hp (151 kW)/L	917/30 race, forced induction
1973	2.4 L	142 kW (190 hp) at 6500 rpm	79 hp (59 kW)/L	S
1974	2.2 L	373 kW (500 hp)	227 hp (169 kW)/L	RSR T race, forced induction
1976	3.0 L	194 kW (260 hp)	86 hp (64 kW)/L	turbocharged
1985–95	5.0–5.4 L	288–316–326–345 hp (257 kW)	66 hp (49 kW)/L	928 32 valve, S, S4, GT, GTS

== Heavy vehicle engines ==
=== Porsche Junior engines ===
- 1957–1961 822 cc (50.2 cu in) 10.3 kW (14.0 PS; 13.8 bhp) air-cooled, four-stroke, single-cylinder diesel (Junior 4, 108 K/KH, 108 L/LH, 108 S, 108 V)
- 1961–1963 875 cc (53.4 cu in) 11.2 kW (15.2 PS; 15.0 bhp) air-cooled, four-stroke, single-cylinder diesel (Junior 109 G (V))

=== Porsche Standard engines ===
- 1960–1961 1.4 L (1,374 cc) 14.6 kW (19.9 PS; 19.6 bhp) air-cooled, four-stroke, two-cylinder diesel (Standard T 217)
- 1957–1958 1.5 L (1,531 cc) 16 kW (22 PS; 21 bhp) air-cooled, four-stroke, two-cylinder diesel (Standard AP/S)
- 1958–1960 1.6 L (1,644 cc) 14.6 kW (19.9 PS; 19.6 bhp) air-cooled, four-stroke, two-cylinder diesel (Standard AP, U 218)
- 1958–1960 1.6 L (1,644 cc) 16.1 kW (21.9 PS; 21.6 bhp) air-cooled, four-stroke, two-cylinder diesel (Standard AP, U 218)
- 1957–1960 1.6 L (1,644 cc) 18.3 kW (24.9 PS; 24.5 bhp) air-cooled, four-stroke, two-cylinder diesel (Standard N 208, H 218, V 218)
- 1961–1962 1.6 L (1,629 cc) 19 kW (26 PS; 25 bhp) air-cooled, four-stroke, two-cylinder diesel (Standard Star 238)
- 1960–1963 1.8 L (1,750 cc) 22.1 kW (30.0 PS; 29.6 bhp) air-cooled, four-stroke, two-cylinder diesel (Standard Star 219)

=== Porsche Super engines ===
- 1957–1962 2.5 L (2,467 cc) 27.8 kW (37.8 PS; 37.3 bhp) air-cooled, four-stroke, three-cylinder diesel (Super N 308, L 308, S 308, B 308)
- 1960–1961 2.5 L (2,467 cc) 29.4 kW (40.0 PS; 39.4 bhp) air-cooled, four-stroke, three-cylinder diesel (Super L 318, L 319)
- 1961–1963 2.6 L (2,625 cc) 26 kW (35 PS; 35 bhp) air-cooled, four-stroke, three-cylinder diesel (Super Export 329, Export 339)
- 1962–1963 2.6 L (2,625 cc) 22 kW (30 PS; 30 bhp) air-cooled, four-stroke, three-cylinder diesel (Super 339)
- 1961–1963 2.6 L (2,625 cc) 29.3 kW (39.8 PS; 39.3 bhp) air-cooled, four-stroke, three-cylinder diesel (Super S 309, B 309)

=== Porsche Master engines ===
- 1958–1960 3.3 L (3,288 cc) 36.6 kW (49.8 PS; 49.1 bhp) air-cooled, four-stroke, four-cylinder diesel (Master 408, 418)
- 1960–1963 3.5 L (3,500 cc) 36.8 kW (50.0 PS; 49.3 bhp) air-cooled, four-stroke, four-cylinder diesel (Master 409, 419, 429)

== Aircraft engines ==
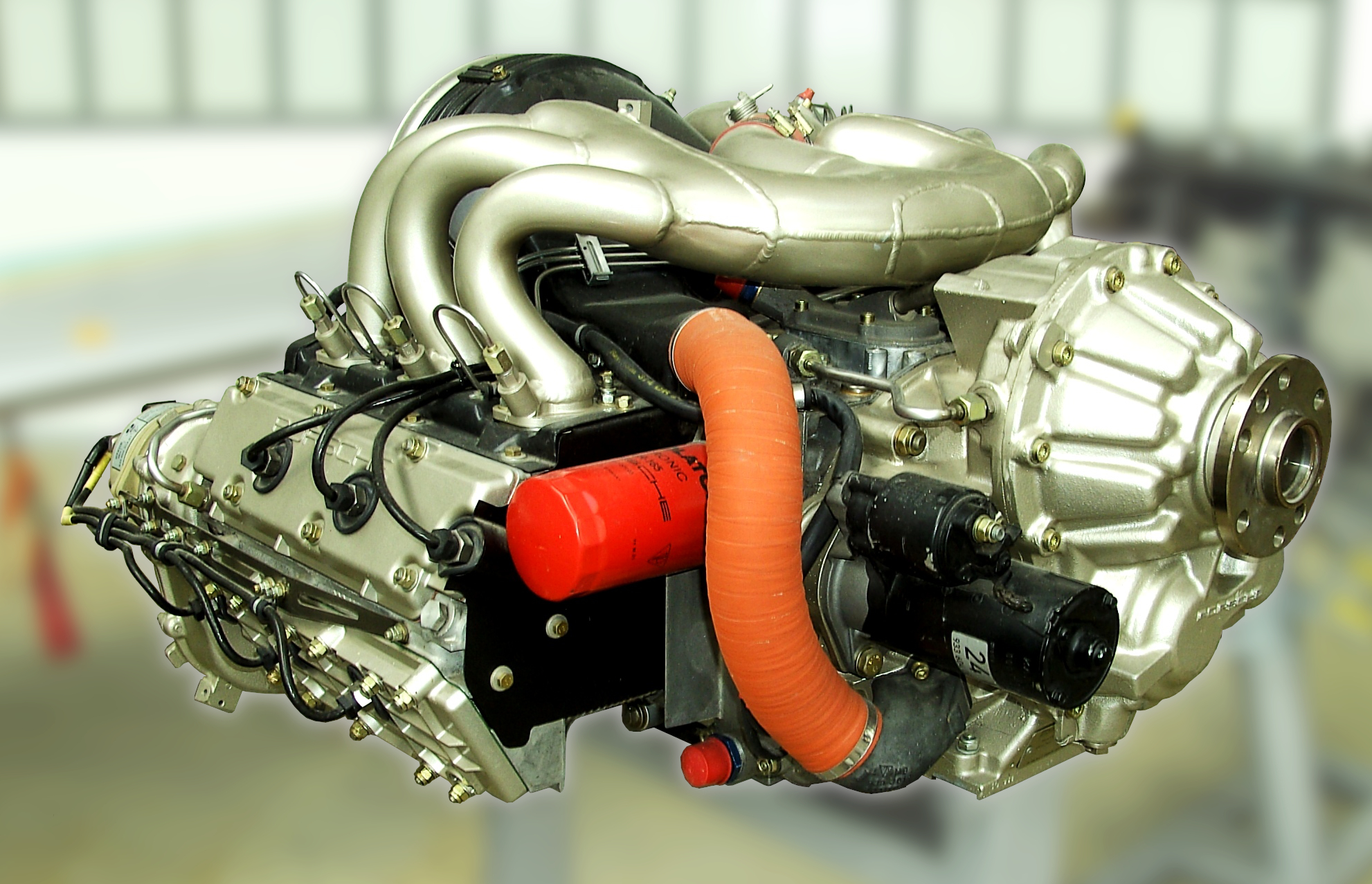
PFM 3200 3.2L flat-six

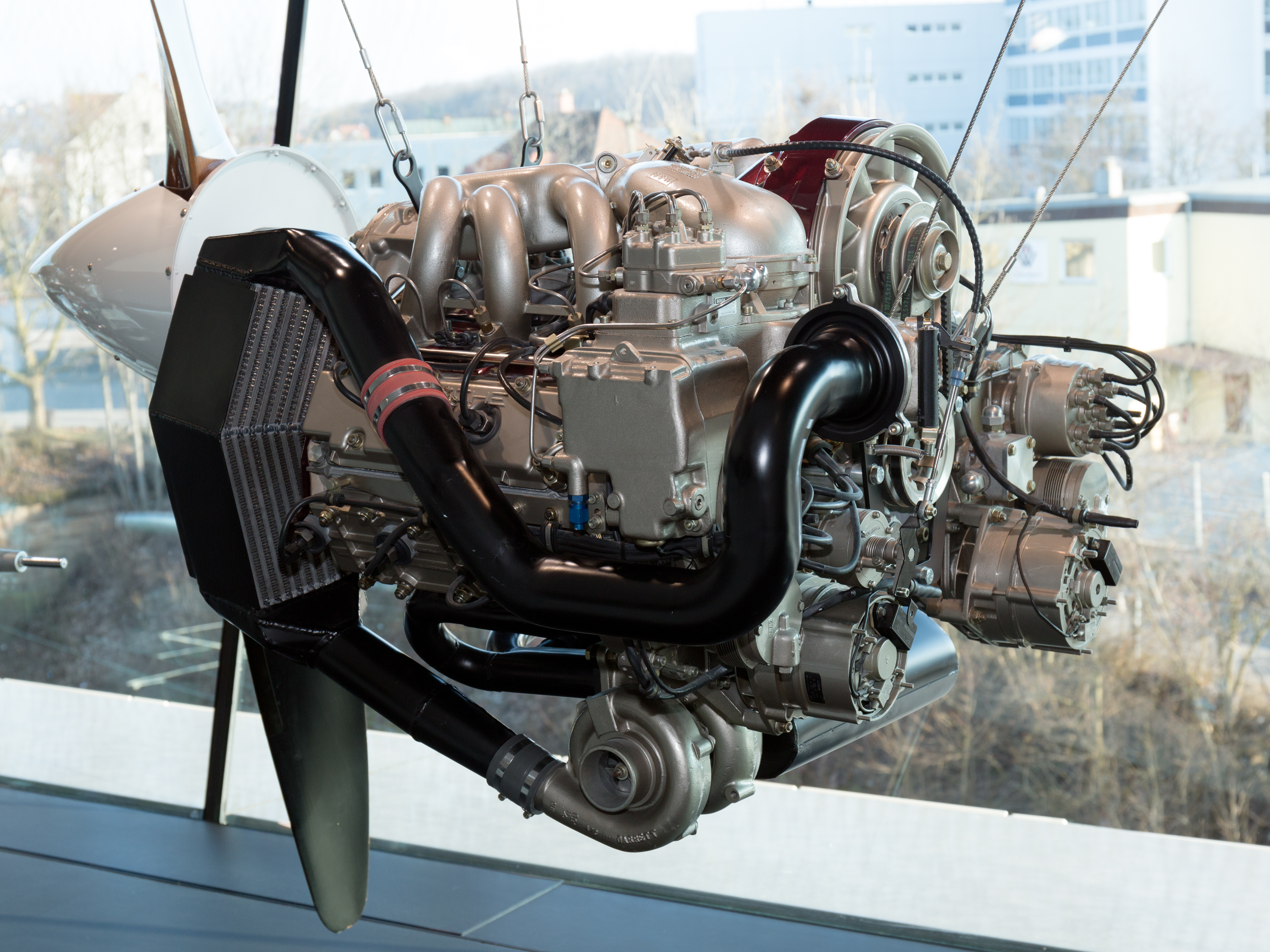
PFM 3200 3.2L flat-six

- 1984–1990 3.2 L Porsche PFM 3200 air-cooled flat-six

== See also ==
- Flat engine
