= List of Hong Kong Polytechnic University alumni =

This is a list of notable graduates of Hong Kong Polytechnic University or the former Hong Kong Polytechnic.

== Politicians and public service ==
- Chan Kam Lam (1971) - former member (Kowloon East) of the Legislative Council of Hong Kong SAR
- Leung Chun Ying (1974, Higher Diploma in Surveying) - former Chief Executive of Hong Kong
- Li Qiang (2005, EMBA) - Premier of the State Council of the People's Republic of China
- Lam Tai-fai (1981, Higher Diploma in Textile Technology) - former member of the Legislative Council of Hong Kong SAR for the Industrial Functional Constituency; currently Chairman of the Council of the Hong Kong Polytechnic University and Chairman of the Hong Kong Sports Institute

== Education ==
- Kim Man Lui (2006, Ph.D. in Software Engineering) - author, business, and professor at Hong Kong Polytechnic University

== Community leaders ==
- Rebecca Lee (1964, Certificate in Commercial Design) - explorer
- Ng Chun-ting, Elton (2000, Bachelor of Science in Physiotherapy; 2005, Master of Science in Sports Physiotherapy) - mountaineer; 2018, Ten Outstanding Young Persons of Hong Kong

== Design and performing arts ==
- Vivienne Tam - fashion designer
- Wong Kar-wai - film director
- Gigi Leung - singer, songwriter and actor
- Raman Hui - film director and animator
- Paul Wong - composer, songwriter, singer and the lead guitarist of the band Beyond
- Alice Mak - artist and cartoonist, mother of cartoon characters McMug and McDull
- Pinky Lai - designer of the original Porsche Boxster and Cayman
- Stella So - illustrator and comic artist
- Phoebus Ng - singer and actor; champion of King Maker II, member of Hong Kong Cantopop group P1X3L
- Beatrix Pang - visual artist

== Outstanding PolyU Alumni Award ==
- List of awardees
