= Porsche Boxster (986) =

First generation of the Porsche Boxster sports car

Porsche 986
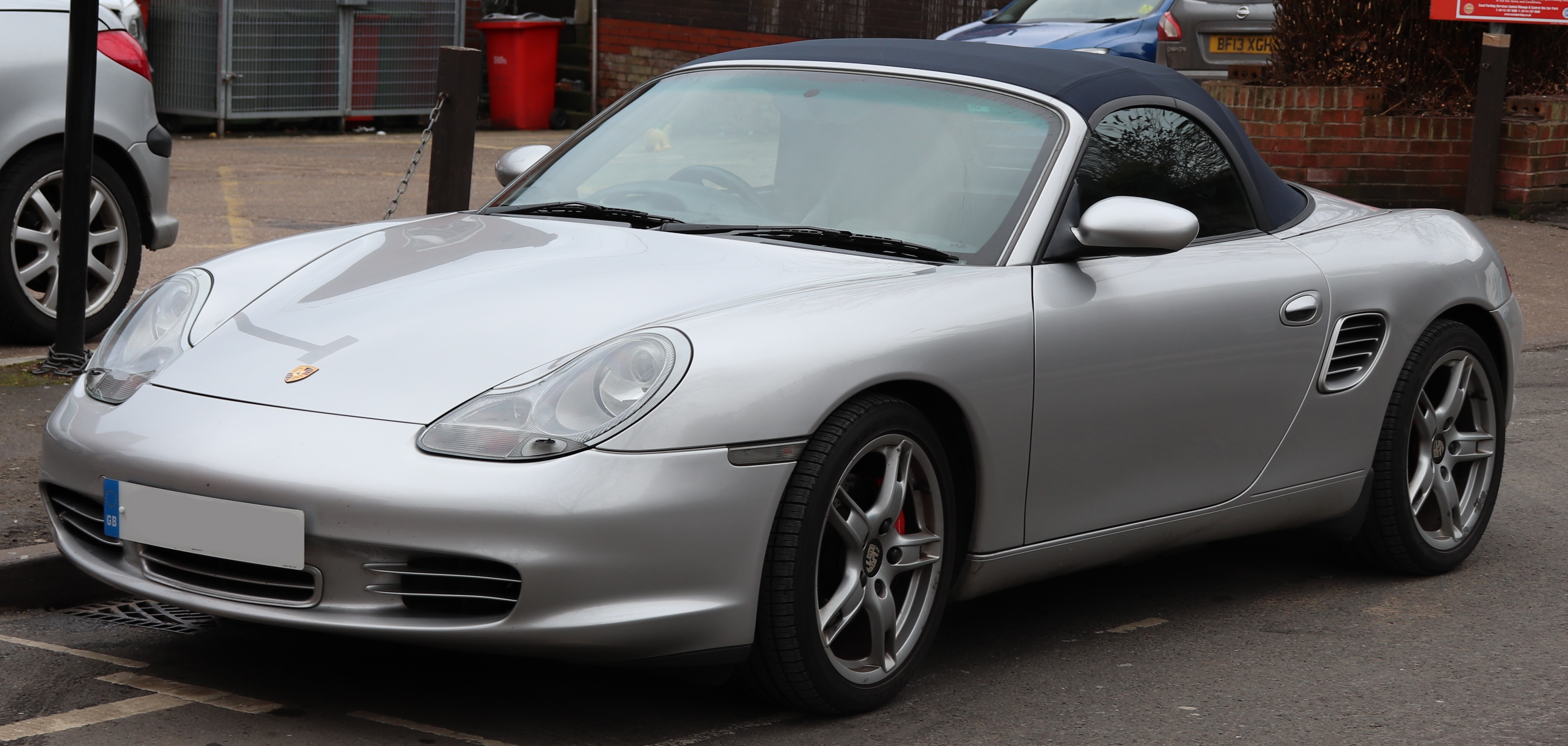
- Porsche Boxster S (post-facelift)

Overview
- Production: 1996–2004
- Assembly: Germany: Stuttgart; Finland: Uusikaupunki (under Valmet Automotive)
- Designer: Grant Larson under Harm Lagaay (1992: concept; production: 1993)

Body and chassis
- Class: Sports car (S)
- Body style: 2-door roadster
- Layout: Mid-engine, rear-wheel drive
- Related: Porsche 996

Powertrain
- Engine: 2.5 L Porsche M96.20 flat-6 (1996–1999); 2.7 L M96.22/M96.23 flat-6 (1999–2004); 3.2 L M96.21/M96.24 flat-6 (1999–2004)
- Transmission: 5-speed automatic; 5-speed manual; 6-speed manual

Dimensions
- Wheelbase: 1996–2002: 2,418 mm (95.2 in); 2002–2004: 2,416 mm (95.1 in)
- Length: 1996–2002: 4,343 mm (171.0 in); 2002–2004: 4,321 mm (170.1 in)
- Width: 1,781 mm (70.1 in)
- Height: 1,290 mm (50.8 in)
- Curb weight: 1,250–1,320 kg (2,756–2,910 lb)

Chronology
- Predecessor: Porsche 968
- Successor: Porsche 987

The Porsche 986 is the internal designation for the first generation Boxster, a mid-engine two-seater roadster built by German automobile manufacturer Porsche. Introduced in late 1996, the Boxster, based on the 1993 Boxster Concept, was Porsche's first road vehicle to be originally designed as a roadster since the Porsche 914. The Boxster's name is derived from the word "boxer", referring to the vehicle's flat or "boxer" engine, and the name "speedster", first seen on the 356. Powered by a 2.5-litre flat six-cylinder engine, the base model was upgraded to a 2.7-litre engine in the year 2000 and a new Boxster S variant was introduced with a 3.2-litre engine. In 2003, styling and engine output was upgraded on both variants. The 986 was succeeded by the 987, which retained the Boxster roadster and added the Cayman fixed-roof coupé body style.

The 986 stimulated a commercial turnaround for Porsche, which during the early 1990s had been suffering with an ageing product range and falling sales, and it's credited with saving the company. The 986 Boxster was Porsche's biggest volume seller from its introduction in 1996 until the introduction of the Cayenne sport utility vehicle in 2003.

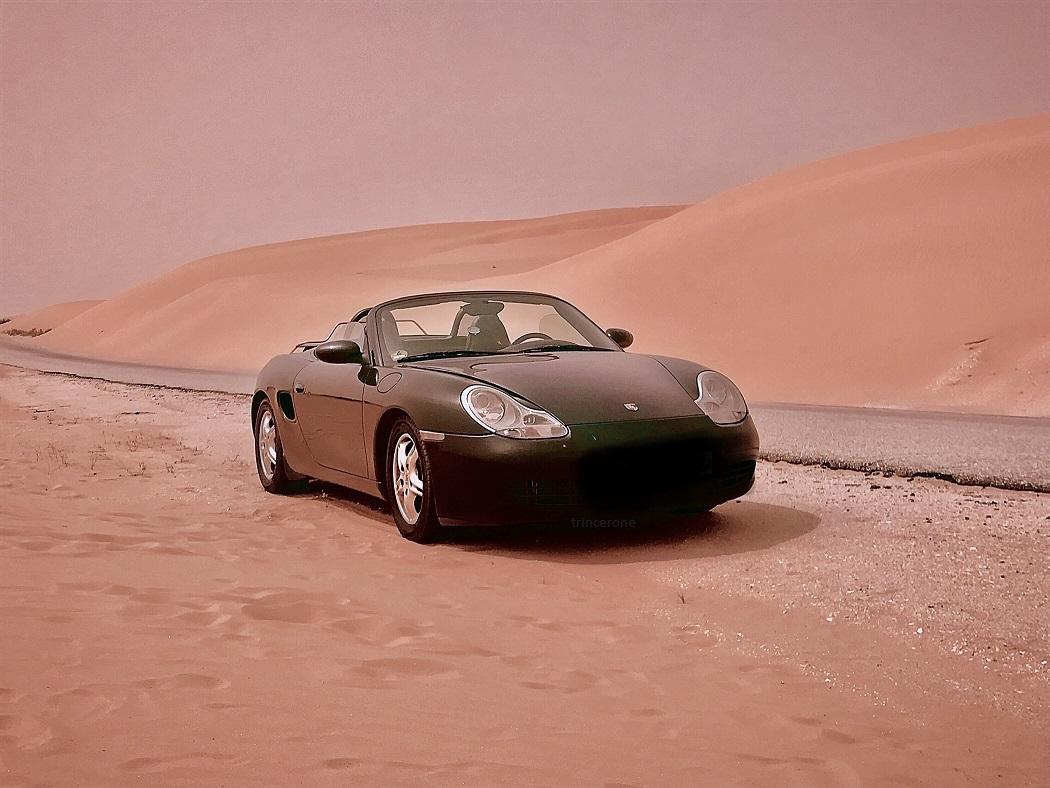
2000 Porsche Boxster 2.7 in Mauritania between Nouadhibou and Nouakchott en route from Paris to Dakar.

== Development ==
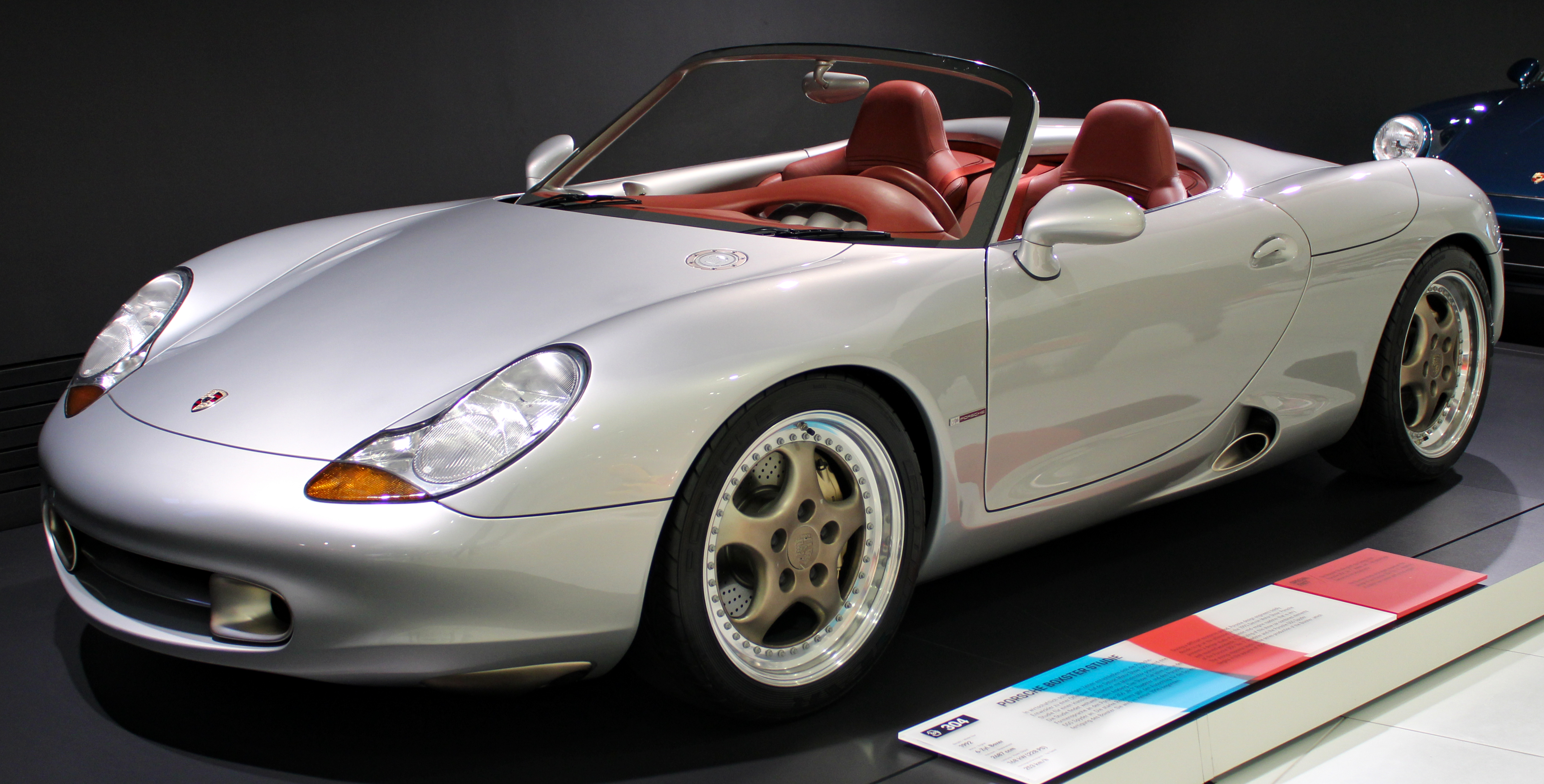
The 1993 Porsche Boxster concept, prior to the production model. Notice the different side air intake.

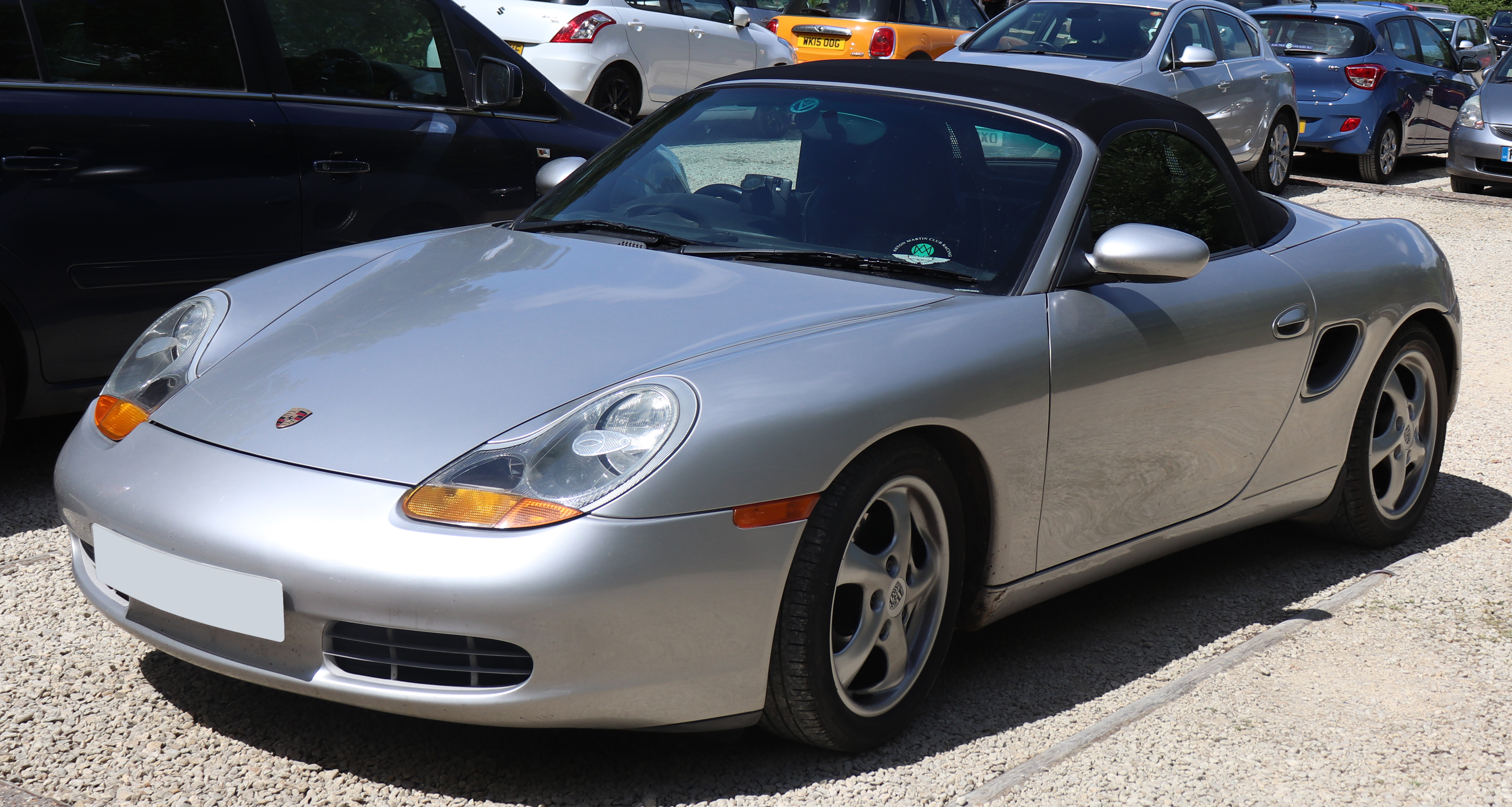
1999 Porsche Boxster 2.5 (pre-facelift)

By the early 1990s, Porsche's lineup was dated, with the most recent new design being 1978's 928, notwithstanding the 968, which was an evolution of the earlier 944

By June 1992, out of 4 proposals based on dual collaboration between the 986 and 996 (993's successor) design teams, a proposal by Grant Larson and Pinky Lai inspired by the 356 Cabriolet, Speedster, and 550 Spyder was chosen by Harm Lagaay.

In August 1992, a decision was made to develop the concept into a show vehicle, in time for the 1993 North American International Auto Show. After garnering widespread acclaim from the press and public upon presentation of the Boxster Concept in January 1993, the final production 986 production exterior design by Larson was frozen in March 1993. By the second half of 1993, however, difficulties arose with fitment of some components, resulting in lengthening of the hood and requiring another design freeze by fourth quarter of that year. Prototypes in 968 bodies were built to test the mid-engine power train of the 986 by the end of 1993, with proper prototypes surfacing in 1994. Pilot production began in the second half of 1995, ahead of series production in mid-1996.

Through consultation with Toyota, Porsche began widely sharing parts among models and slashed costs. The Boxster shares parts with the more expensive 911 (internal designation 996), including the bonnet, front wings, headlights, interior and engine architecture.

Production of the 986 began at the former 928 facility in Stuttgart, Germany in 1996. Valmet Automotive also manufactured Boxsters under contract to Porsche at a facility in Uusikaupunki, Finland. The cars assembled in Finland have the letter "U" as the 11th character of the VIN instead of the "S" in the German assembled cars.

== Engine ==
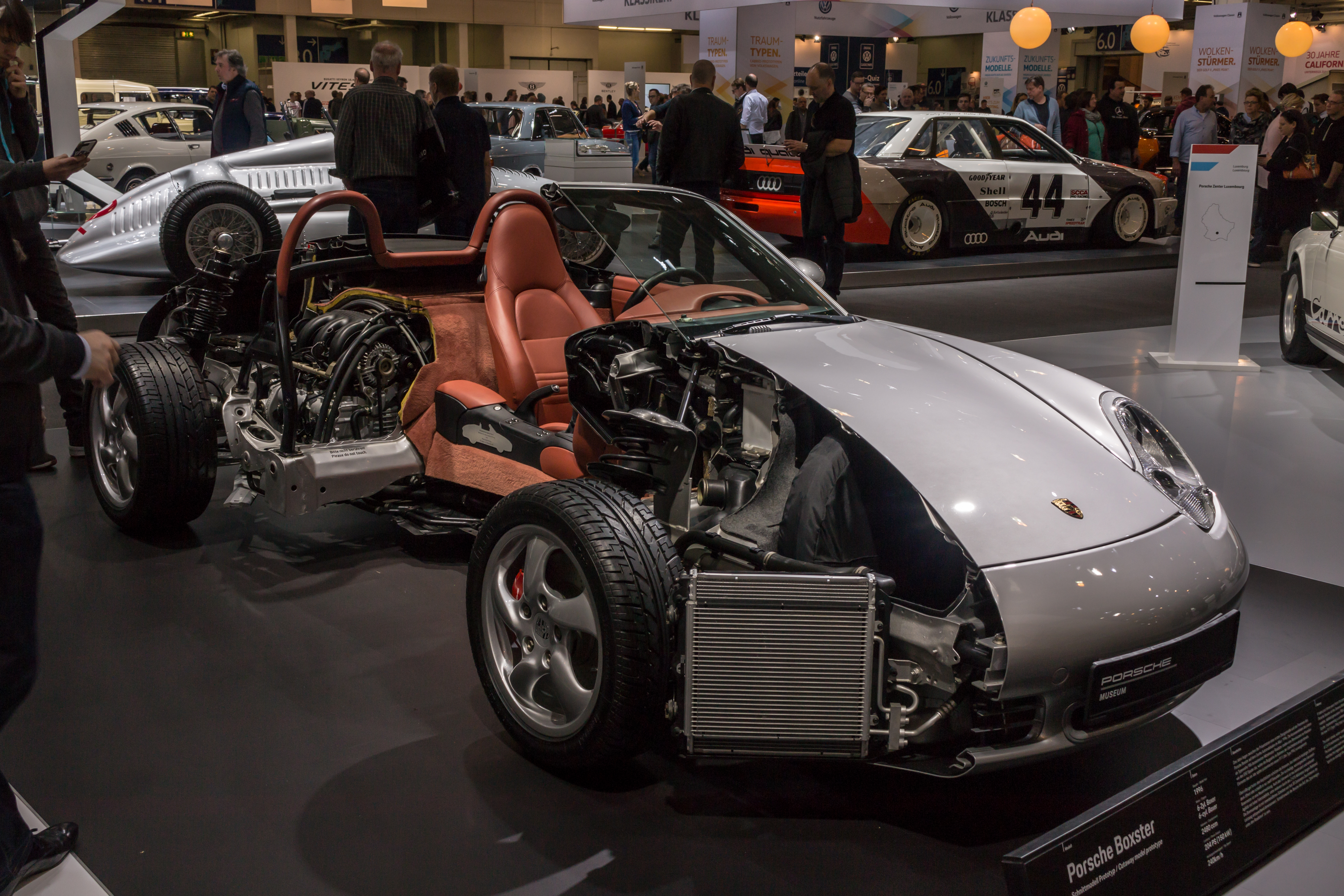
Porsche Boxster cutaway showing the inner workings of the car

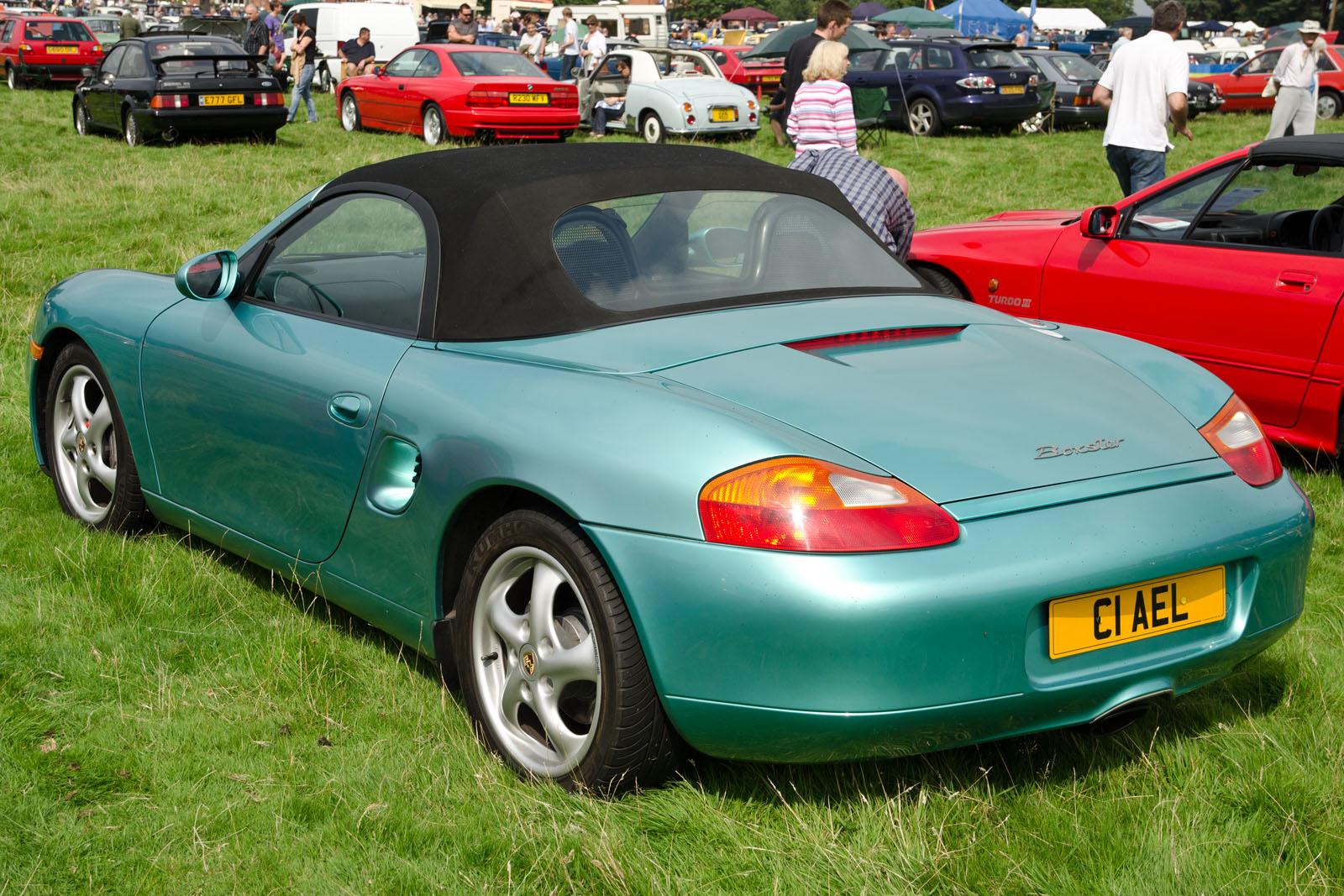
1999 Porsche Boxster rear view (pre-facelift)

The 986 Boxster uses the M96, a water-cooled, horizontally opposed ("flat"), six-cylinder engine. It was Porsche's first water-cooled non-front engine. In the Boxster, it is placed mid-engine, while in the 911, the traditional rear-engine layout is used. The engines used in the Boxster are low displacement versions of the 3.4-litre Flat-6 found in the 996 Carrera. The mid-engine layout provides a low center of gravity, near-perfect weight distribution, and neutral handling. The engines had a number of failures, resulting in cracked or slipped cylinder liners, which were resolved by a minor redesign and better control of the casting process in late 1999. A failure for these early engines was a spate of porous engine blocks, as the manufacturer had difficulty in the casting process. In addition to causing problems with coolant and oil systems mingling fluids, it also resulted in Porsche's decision to repair faulty engines by boring out the cast sleeves on the cylinders where defects were noted in production and inserting new sleeves rather than scrapping the engine block. Normally, the cylinder walls are cast at the same time as the rest of the engine, this being the reason for adopting the casting technology.

== Facelift ==
The model received a minor facelift in 2002. The plastic rear window was replaced by a smaller glass window with a heating element. The interior received a glove compartment, new electro-mechanical hood and trunk release mechanism (with an electronic emergency release in the fuse box panel) and an updated steering wheel. Porsche installed a reworked exhaust pipe and air intake.

In addition, the front headlight's amber "fried egg" indicators were replaced with clear indicators. The rear light cluster was also changed with translucent grey turn signals replacing the amber ones. The side marker lights on the front wings were changed as well from amber to clear, except on American market cars where they remained amber. The bumpers were also changed slightly for a more defined, chiseled appearance, and new wheel designs were made available.

=== Boxster 986 model history ===
Year	Engine and power	Transmission	0–100 km/h (0–62 mph)	0–60 mph (0–97 km/h)	Top speed
1996	2.5L, 150 kW (204 PS)	Manual	6.9 seconds	6.7 seconds	240 km/h (149 mph)
1996	2.5L, 150 kW (204 PS)	Tiptronic	7.6 seconds	7.4 seconds	235 km/h (146 mph)
2000	2.7L, 162 kW (220 PS)	Manual	6.6 seconds	6.5 seconds	250 km/h (155 mph)
2000	2.7L, 162 kW (220 PS)	Tiptronic	7.4 seconds	7.2 seconds	245 km/h (152 mph)
2000	3.2L S, 184 kW (250 PS)	Manual	5.9 seconds	5.6 seconds	260 km/h (162 mph)
2000	3.2L S, 184 kW (250 PS)	Tiptronic	6.5 seconds	6.2 seconds	255 km/h (158 mph)
2003	2.7L, 165 kW (225 PS)	Manual	6.4 seconds		253 km/h (157 mph)
2003	2.7L, 165 kW (225 PS)	Tiptronic S	7.3 seconds		248 km/h (154 mph)
2003	3.2L S, 190 kW (258 PS)	Manual	5.7 seconds		264 km/h (164 mph)
2003	3.2L S, 190 kW (258 PS)	Tiptronic S	6.4 seconds		258 km/h (160 mph)

=== Boxster S Special Edition ===
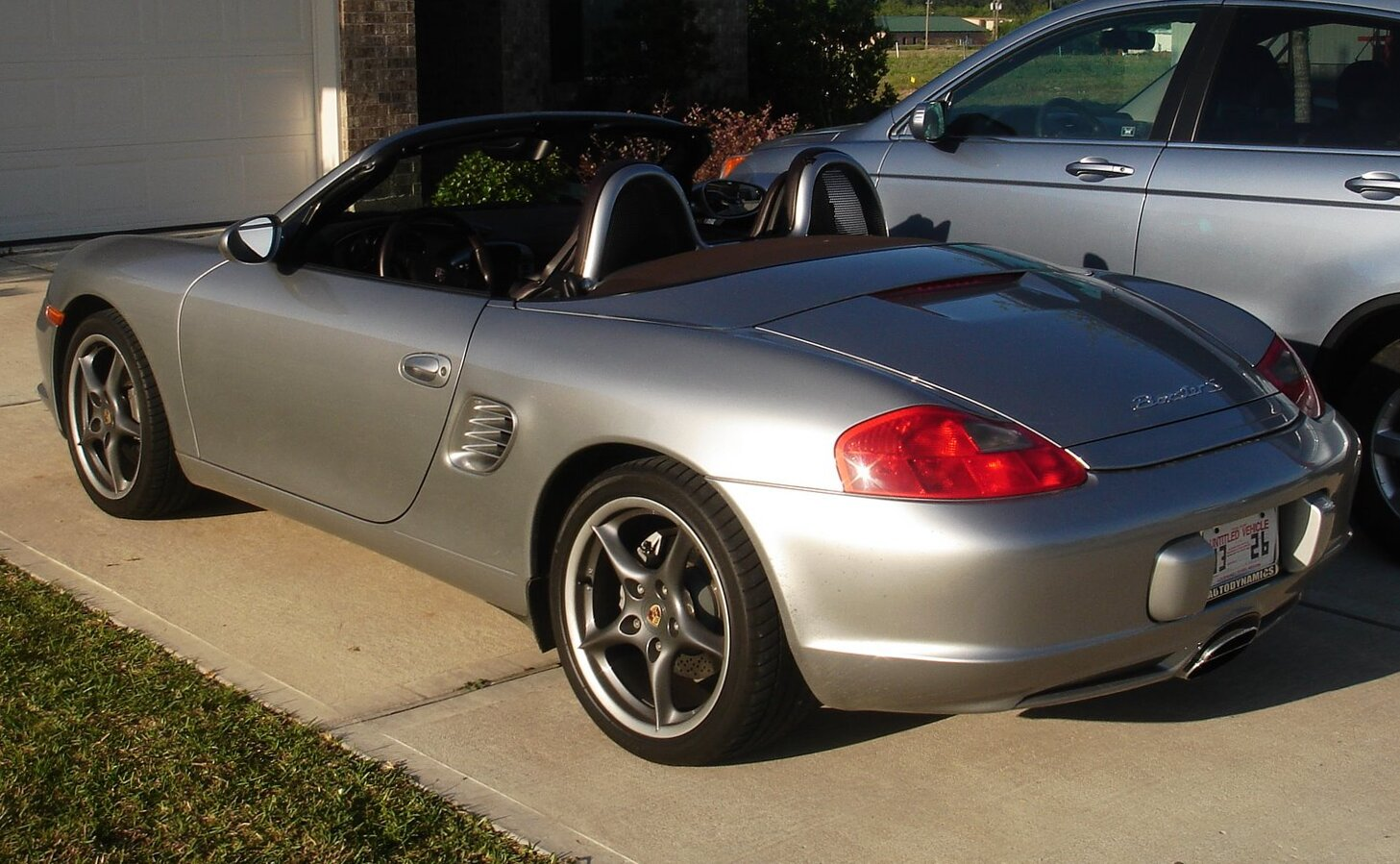
Boxster S Special Edition

In 2004, the Boxster S Special Edition, also called the 550 Spyder Boxster S Special Edition, was introduced. It had a production run of 1,953 cars (paying homage to the 550 Spyder's year of introduction), with 500 cars made for the US market. These were all painted in GT Silver Metallic, the same colour as the Carrera GT concept presented in 2000, and had unique cocoa-brown full-leather interior as standard, with grey natural leather as a no-cost option. Each car also had special interior paintwork, a Bose sound system, two-tone grey and silver 18 inch Carrera wheels (unpainted as another zero-cost option), 5 mm (0.2 in) wheel spacers, the Boxster S sport exhaust, the M030 option sports suspension, and a plate on the center console piece commonly known as the "batwing" showing the production number. Only on the American market cars were the rear turn signals red rather than clear.
