= Studio Voltaire =

Coordinates: 51°27′44″N 0°8′5″W

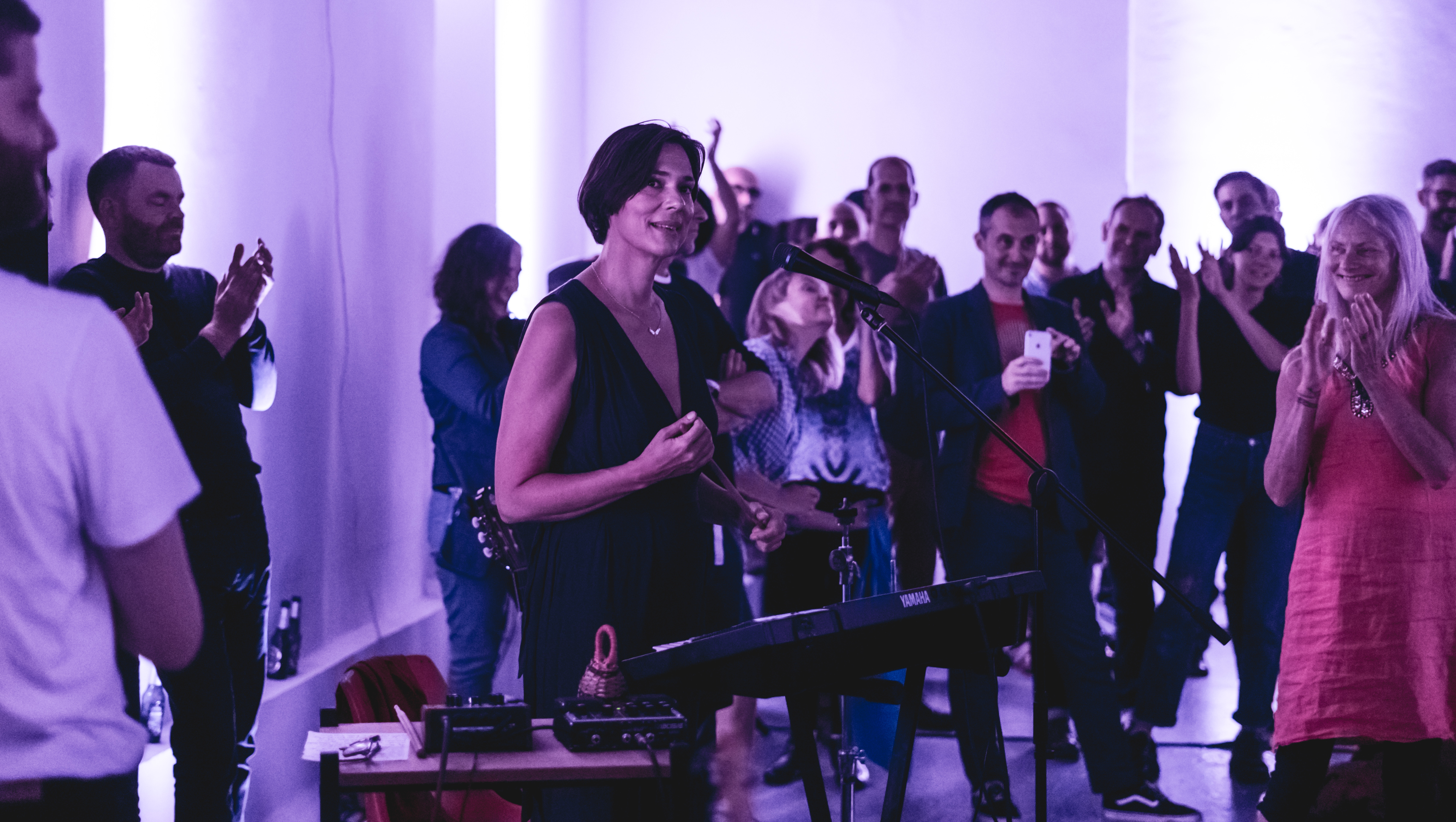
Lætitia Sadier performing in 2017

Studio Voltaire is a non-profit gallery and artist studios based in Clapham, South London. The organisation focuses on contemporary arts, staging a public programme of exhibitions, performances, and live events. Studio Voltaire invests in the production of new work and often gives artists their first opportunity for a solo exhibition in London. The gallery space is housed in a Victorian former Methodist Chapel and artist commissions frequently take the form of site-specific installation, focusing on the unique architecture of the space. Studio Voltaire also provides affordable workspace to over 40 artists and hosts artist residencies with a variety of national and international partners. Since 2011 the Not Our Class programme has provided a series of participation and research projects for local audiences. In 2011 Studio Voltaire was awarded with regular funding from Arts Council England as a National Portfolio Organisation. Joe Scotland is the Director of Studio Voltaire.

== National exhibitions and events ==
Studio Voltaire was established in 1994 on Voltaire Road, Clapham, by a small artist collective. In 1999 it moved to its current location in a former Methodist Chapel at Nelson’s Row, Clapham.

Studio Voltaire produced its first Print Portfolio, including editions by acclaimed artists Jeremy Deller, Mark Titchner and Spartacus Chetwynd, in 2005. The organisation has subsequently developed a strong reputation for producing affordably priced artist editions, including works by Cory Arcangel, Ryan McGinley and Wolfgang Tillmans. Also in 2005 Studio Voltaire commissioned Spartacus Chetwynd’s The Walk to Dover, the artist’s first offsite project, involving a week-long expedition from London to Dover.

Studio Voltaire began an artist residency programme in 2006 in collaboration with the Berlin Cultural Senate and Whitechapel Gallery, London to host a Berlin-based artist with workspace for a 10-month period. Elizabeth Price presented her first video work A Public Lecture & Exhumation in 2006.

Georgian-born artist Thea Djordjadze presented Possibility Nansen in 2007, her first exhibition in the UK following a residency period at Studio Voltaire.

Studio Voltaire commissioned Nairy Baghramian’s exhibition Butcher, Barber, Angler & Others in 2009, the artist’s first exhibition in the UK. Cathy Wilkes presented a mixed media installation entitled Mummy’s here in 2009, the first exhibition since her nomination for the Turner Prize in 2008.

In 2010, Phyllida Barlow’s critically acclaimed installation Bluff led to widespread recognition for the artist, including a subsequent presentation with Nairy Baghramian at the Serpentine Gallery and commercial representation with Hauser & Wirth. Also in 2010 Studio Voltaire established House of Voltaire, an offsite temporary shop.

In 2011 Studio Voltaire initiated Not Our Class, a programme of education and participatory projects exploring the legacy of photographer Jo Spence. Collaborators included Marysia Lewandowska and The Jo Spence Memorial Archive, Rehana Zaman working with King’s College Hospital and Body & Soul, research group X Marks The Spot and Intoart. Mark Francis Writer, Curator and Director, Gagosian Gallery, London was appointed as Chair of Trustees in 2011.

In 2012, in collaboration with Space, Studio Voltaire mounted the first major retrospective of photographer Jo Spence on the twentieth anniversary of her death.

In 2021 Studio Voltaire reopened following a £2.8m renovation project designed by the architects Matheson Whiteley. The project took existing studio space for 30 artists and increased its capacity to 75, as well as improving the quality and heating of the studios. Studio Voltaire's design shop, House of Voltaire, was given a permanent home as part of the renovation works.

The Loewe Foundation / Studio Voltaire Award international artist residency was established in 2021. It comes with a year-long studio space at Studio Voltaire, a £25,000 ($32,522) stipend for accommodations and living costs, a production and travel budget, and a professional development program. Recipients have since included Beatrix Pang (2022) and Prajakta Potnis (2024).
