= Ng Chun-ting =

Ng Chun-ting, Elton (Chinese: 吳俊霆, born 1978) is a mountaineer, trail athlete and physiotherapist specialising in sports physiotherapy based in Hong Kong. He has been active in mountaineering, orienteering and trail races since 1997.

On 30 September 2016, Ng conquered the Eighth Highest Summit of Mt Manaslu (8,163 metres) --- making him the second person in Hong Kong to succeed in such expedition.

On 12 April 2017, Ng, together with two organ-transplant-recipient athletes from the Hong Kong Transplant Sports Association (HKTSA), embarked on an expedition to the Mt Everest. While he attempts to be the fourth person in Hong Kong to conquer the summit from the Southern Course, this is also to raise awareness to Organ-Transplantation in Hong Kong and sponsorship for HKTSA.

Ng reached the summit of Mt. Everest on 21 May 2017, together with Ada Tsang, a former secondary teacher in Hong Kong. Tsang thus became the first Hong Kong woman to summit Everest.

== Life as a sportsman ==
Born with poor health, Ng grew up in the squatter near a shabby area in Yuen Long that is nicknamed “the big drainage” – the name itself depicted how poor and dirty the vicinity is. The family was subsequently relocated to the public housing estate nearby. Elton developed an interest in photography which transcended into a passion for nature during his earlier years, and that drove him to the trails and hills near where he lived. The view of the farmland and greeneries of Yuen Long back then was mesmerising, and a stunning sunset was guaranteed on a fine day.

Elton joined The Duke of Edinburgh's Award (renamed to The Hong Kong Award for Young People) in Form 3, and gradually sharpened his skills in mountaineering and orienteering. His natural talent in navigation and good memory helped him conquer 250 hills in Hong Kong by the age of 21. He joined the Oxfam Trailwalker in 1997 along with his three secondary classmates, making them the youngest team ever to join the event. The team finished 100 km in a whooping 27 hours.

In 2000, he came fourth in the 1st “Raleigh Challenge - Mountain Marathon” in 2000, his education on sports science and physiotherapy to his training brought him championship in that same race a year after. His achievements in sports earned him a sponsorship by the “Protrek”, an outdoor and sporting goods company. Elton has since remained a sponsored athlete of the “Protrek” to date.

Elton raced intensively and frequently during his earlier years, and was plagued by all sorts of injuries. He adopted a proactive approach in rehabilitating himself and developed his own philosophy of recovery science. He realized he could not engage in one single sports activity like endurance running. He extended his scope to mountaineering, orienteering, rock climbing, ice climbing, snow climbing, triathlon, mountain biking, open water swimming, kayaking, scuba diving, sailing and horse riding, and achieved amazing results in all of these sports. Elton is among the first few all-rounded sportsman in Hong Kong, and he is especially outstanding in orienteering --- 9 times Champion of the elite division of the “Raleigh International Mountain Marathon” and 7 times Overall Team Champion in the “AYP Rogaine 24 Hour Orienteering Championship”.

Elton completed the “Sports Specialist Program of the American College of Sports Science” in 2003 and earned his Postgraduate Degree in Physiotherapy of the “Hong Kong Polytechnic University” in 2004. He is constantly learning and had acquired professional and coaching qualifications in mountaineering, rock climbing, sports climbing, kayaking and sailing between 2000 and 2005. Elton grew up in a humble family, he worked part-time on top of his full-time physiotherapy job during that same period and saved up a decent sum of HK$1.2 million as the startup capital for his first clinic --- the “CORES, Centre of Rehabilitation and Exercise Specialist” in 2006. His private practice did not stop him from engaging in sports and community service. He worked as team physiotherapist for sports teams and races of different sports and origins, the “National Women's Rugby's Team” of Australia, the “World Transplant Games” in Australia, the “World Orienteering Championship” in Denmark and Japan, the practice games of the “Premier League Championships” in London to name a few.

Elton is not only all-time champion in local trail and orienteering races, he came 4th in the “City Chase World Championship” in Italy in 2007; 3rd in the “China All-Rounded Orienteering Championship” in Zhejiang China in 2011 and 6th in the “China All-Rounded Orienteering Championship” in Guangxi China in 2011.

The mountains are always on the calling for Elton, his footprints are found on some of the most amazing summits around the world. Elton, though born with poor health, is blessed with a physique that made him highly adapted to high altitude. The effect of altitude sickness starts kicking in at 5,000 metres when the oxygen content in blood drops to around 70% for most people, but Elton's oxygen content remains in the high 90%. Elton didn't rely on his natural gift, he spent more than 10 years training in over 30 summits, ranging from 3,000 to 7,000 metres around the world before embarking on his expedition of the dangerous Manaslu, the 8th highest summit in the world.

On 4 September 2016, Elton led the expedition team comprising some local television artists and the TVB Crew to the Mt Manaslu. The Crew suffered from various ill effects of the high altitude once they set foot at the Base Camp at 4,850 metres. Only one artist managed to get to Camp 1 at 5,800 metres, and the whole crew retreated thereafter, leaving Elton on his solo adventure to the very top. On 30 September, Elton made it to the Summit of Manasalu at 8,163 metres, the second Hong Kong person to succeed in such expedition. The expedition was captured and subsequently broadcast on TVB's program “Heaven and Earth”, in celebration of the station's anniversary.

On 21 May 2017, Elton reached the summit of Mount Everest (8,848 metres). The expedition is especially meaningful this time as he's bringing with him two patients who recovered from organ transplant. Elton, being the “Life Invigorating Ambassador” of the Hong Kong Transplant Sports Association, hopes to promote helping organ transplant patients to engage in sports activities, and to raise funds for the Association through this expedition.

== Achievements in mountaineering ==
The list of summits that Elton has conquered include:

- Mt. Everest, 8848m
- Mt. Manaslu 8163m, making him the second person in Hong Kong to have conquered this summit
- Mt. Island Peak, 6189m
- Mt. Lobuche Peak, 6119m
- Mt. Kilimanjaro, 5895m
- Mt. Kosciuszko, 2228m
- Mt. Kalapattar, 5643m
- The Everest Base camp, 5334m
- Mt. Kinabulu, 4095m
- Mt Tanigawadake
- Solo Expeditions to the various Summits in China, Taiwan and Japan
- Conquering 250 highest summits in Hong Kong before the age of 21

== Important races and achievements ==
Elton has participated in over 400 local and international races winning in over 200 of them. The following is a list of his major achievements:-

Year	Race	Category	Achievements
2007	City Chase World Championship, Italy	Orienteering	4th Place
2009	China All–Rounded Orienteering Championship, Zhejiang	Orienteering	2nd Runner-up
2011	China All–Rounded Orienteering Championship, Guangxi	Orienteering	6th Place
2001-2013	Raleigh International Mountain Marathon	Ultra Endurance Trail	9 times Champion
2007	City Chase Hong Kong Championship	Orienteering	Champion
2008	Kaohsiung International Sailing Rally, Taiwan	Sailing	Champion
2010	Tenggeli Desert 90 km Challenge, Inner Mongolia	Extreme Ultra Endurance	Champion
2011	China Shangri La Challenge Race	Ultra Endurance Trail	Champion
2013	Gobi Desert 100 km Challenge, Dunhuang	Extreme Ultra Endurance	Champion
2001	Oxfam Trailwalker 100 km	Ultra Endurance Trail	Category Champion
2003	Land Rover Amazing Adventure 200 km	Ultra Endurance Trail	Champion
2005	MSF Orienteering Competition	Ultra Trail Orienteering	Champion
2006-2017	Outward Bound Adventure Race	Ultra Trail Orienteering	10 times Champion
2006-2012	NEMM Ultra Trail Marathon	Ultra Trail Marathon	7 times Champion
2007-2017	AYP Rogaine 24-hour Race	Ultra Trail Orienteering	7 times Champion
2008-2015	Green Power Hike 25 km	Trail	5 times Individual and Team Champion
2009	Action Asia Action Sprint	Trail	Champion
2012	Green Power Hike 50 km	Trail	Champion
2013	Hong Kong Night Orienteering Open Competition	Trail Orienteering	Champion
2015	Hong Kong 100	Ultra Trail Endurance	7th place in local category

== TV programs and publications ==
- 2017 ”The Adventures of Sports”, proposed publication to be issued in 2017
- 2016 “Peak to Pit” (Chinese: 天與地), TVB Program
- 2014 “From Horizon to Flying Free in Wilderness”, publication
- 2013 “Xtreme Marathon” (Chinese: 極地狂奔), TVB Program
- 2013 “Running in Hong Kong – A Collection of My Favorite Running Routes”, Publication
- 2013-2017 Hosting Online Radio Programs on Sportune

== Community service and contributions ==
Ng started volunteering every summer at the “United Christian Hospital in Hong Kong since secondary school. He developed empathy for the patients and all those who are suffering, this experience inspired him on his career as a physiotherapist.

Since 2002, Ng has been a committee member of the Sports Specialty Group of the “Hong Kong Physiotherapy Association” for 8 years. He also contributed in the continuing professional development to the physiotherapy field.

Since 2003, he is a Grade IV officer in the Auxiliary Medical Service. He has presented in many seminars; organizing and providing on-field physiotherapy service in Hong Kong and overseas.

In 2007, Ng served as the Committee Member of the “Board of Sports Injury and Physiotherapy Curriculum” under the “Accident and Emergency Service Training Centre” of the Hospital Authority, coaching physiotherapists to handle emergency sports injuries. He founded “CORES, the Centre of Rehabilitation and Exercise Specialists” in 2006 to provide physiotherapy and sports training to the general public.

In 2009, Ng completed the “Pitch Side Immediate Trauma Care Course (PSITCC)” course of the Royal College of Surgeons, Edinburgh, United Kingdom. He also became a Core Member of the Medical Committee of the Hong Kong Rugby Union and the Consultant of the Field Research Tour of the Scout Association of Hong Kong.

He is also Committee Member of Physiotherapy Sub-Committee of the 2009 East Asian Games held in Hong Kong, providing physiotherapy consultation to the game.

In 2017, Ng became the “Life Invigorating Ambassador” of the Hong Kong Transplant Sports Association (HKTSA) in 2017. This new role is to help raise public awareness of organ transplant and to help raise funds for the numerous educational projects of the Association.

He is also an AASFP Lecturer. With his extensive knowledge and practical experience in sports science, Ng has given talks and seminars to over 50 non–profit organisations and educational institutions in Hong Kong, including the University of Hong Kong, the Chinese University of Hong Kong, the Hong Kong Medical Association, the Asia Pacific League of Associations for Rheumatology etc.
