= Porsche 911 (996) =

Fifth generation of the Porsche 911 sports car

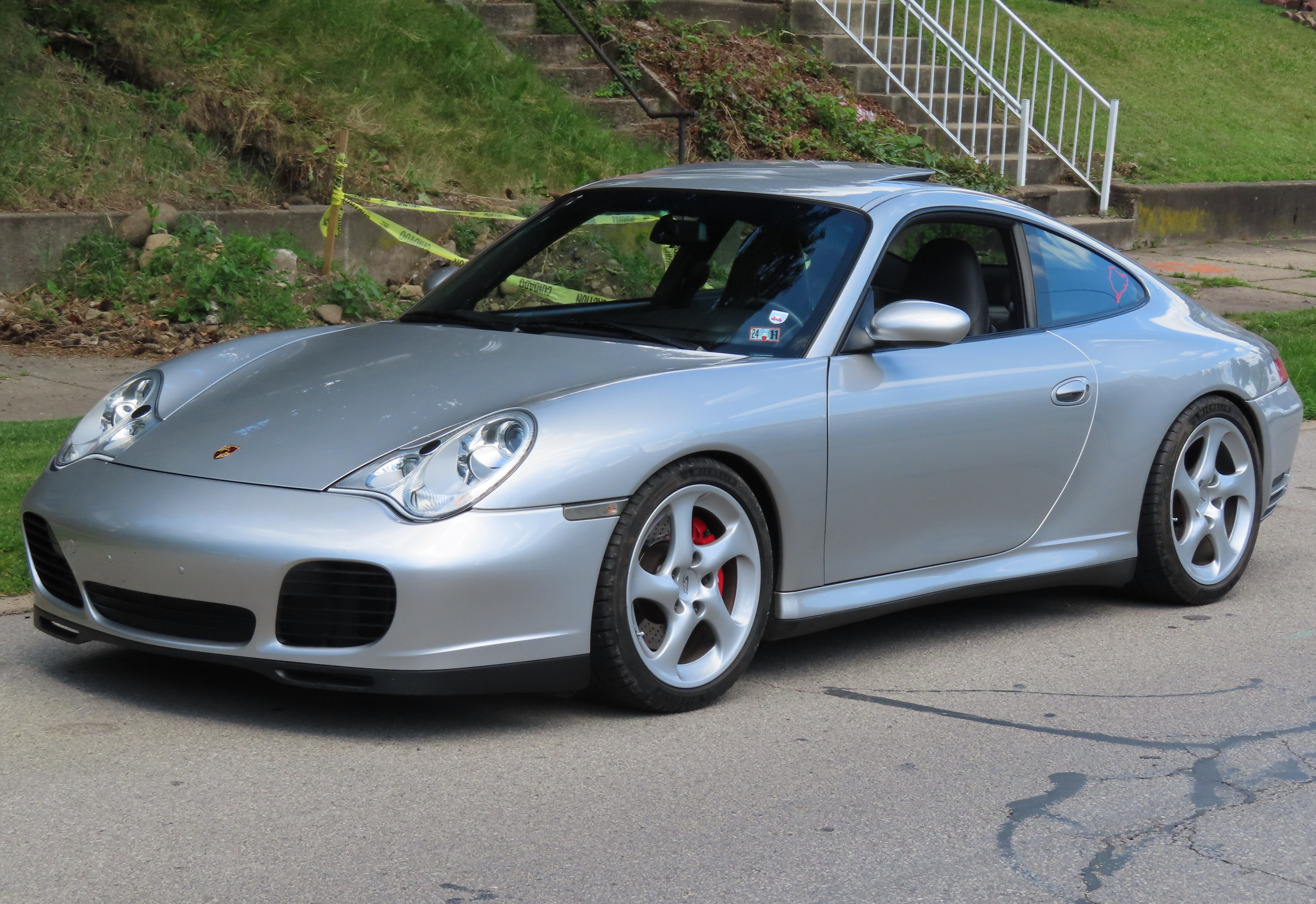
- Porsche 996 Carrera 4S

Overview
- Manufacturer: Porsche AG
- Also called: Porsche 911; Porsche Carrera
- Production: July 17, 1997–2004 (2005 and 2006 for 911 Turbo S, GT2 and GT3 models only)
- Assembly: Germany: Stuttgart
- Designer: Pinky Lai (1993–2006); Harm Lagaay

Body and chassis
- Class: Sports car (S)
- Body style: 2-door coupé; 2-door convertible; 2-door Targa top
- Layout: Rear-engine, rear-wheel drive/Rear-engine, all-wheel drive
- Related: Porsche 986 Boxster; Ruf RTurbo; Ruf RGT

Powertrain
- Engine: 3.4 L–3.6 L M96 naturally aspirated/twin-turbocharged flat-6
- Transmission: 6-speed Getrag G96/00 manual; 5-speed ZF 5HP19 automatic; 5-speed Mercedes-Benz 5G-Tronic automatic

Dimensions
- Wheelbase: 92.6 in (2,352 mm)
- Length: 174.5 in (4,432 mm); Carrera 4S and Turbo: 174.6 in (4,435 mm)
- Width: 1999–2001: 69.5 in (1,765 mm); 2002–2004: 69.7 in (1,770 mm); Carrera 4S and Turbo: 72.0 in (1,829 mm)
- Height: 51.4 in (1,306 mm); Carrera 4S and Turbo: 51.0 in (1,295 mm); 40th Anniversary coupé: 50.2 in (1,275 mm); GT2: 50.2 in (1,275 mm)
- Curb weight: 2,904 lb (1,317 kg)

Chronology
- Predecessor: Porsche 993
- Successor: Porsche 997

The Porsche 996 is the fifth generation of the 911 model sports car manufactured by the German automaker Porsche from 1997 until 2006. It was replaced by the 997 in 2004, but the high performance Turbo S, GT2 and GT3 variants remained in production until 2006. The 996 had little in common with its predecessor, with the first all new chassis platform since the original 911 and a new water-cooled engine. Technically, it was a major change, a complete break from the original car other than the overall layout.

The 996's development was shared with the roadster-only Porsche Boxster (986) whose nameplate was making its debut as Porsche's entry-level offering. The 986 was released shortly before the 996 for sales. Commonalities between the 996 and 986 included the front suspension, various interior components, and the engine, all of which were enlarged for the 996. The multi-link rear suspension was derived from the preceding 993. This was done mainly to save development costs as Porsche was facing financial troubles at that time. This move resulted in cost savings of approximately 30% in the development of the car.

At its debut, the 996 featured the most significant change from the classic 911 series: a water-cooled engine replacing the previously air-cooled engine. Progressively more stringent emissions and noise regulations, environmental concerns, a higher expectation for refinement and the need for a high-performance 4 valve per cylinder engine made the switch necessary. Other major changes include a completely new platform having a sleeker body with a more raked windshield, and a re-designed interior along with new "fried egg" shaped headlamp covers (so called due to the amber coloured turn signals) instead of previous "bug eye" headlamps.

== Design and history ==
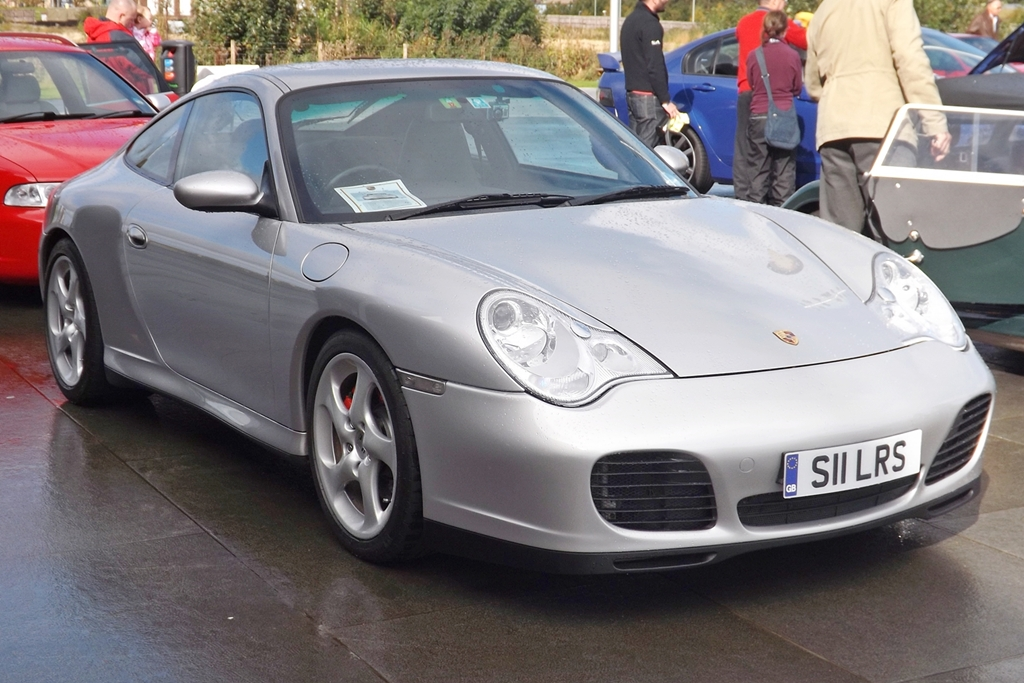
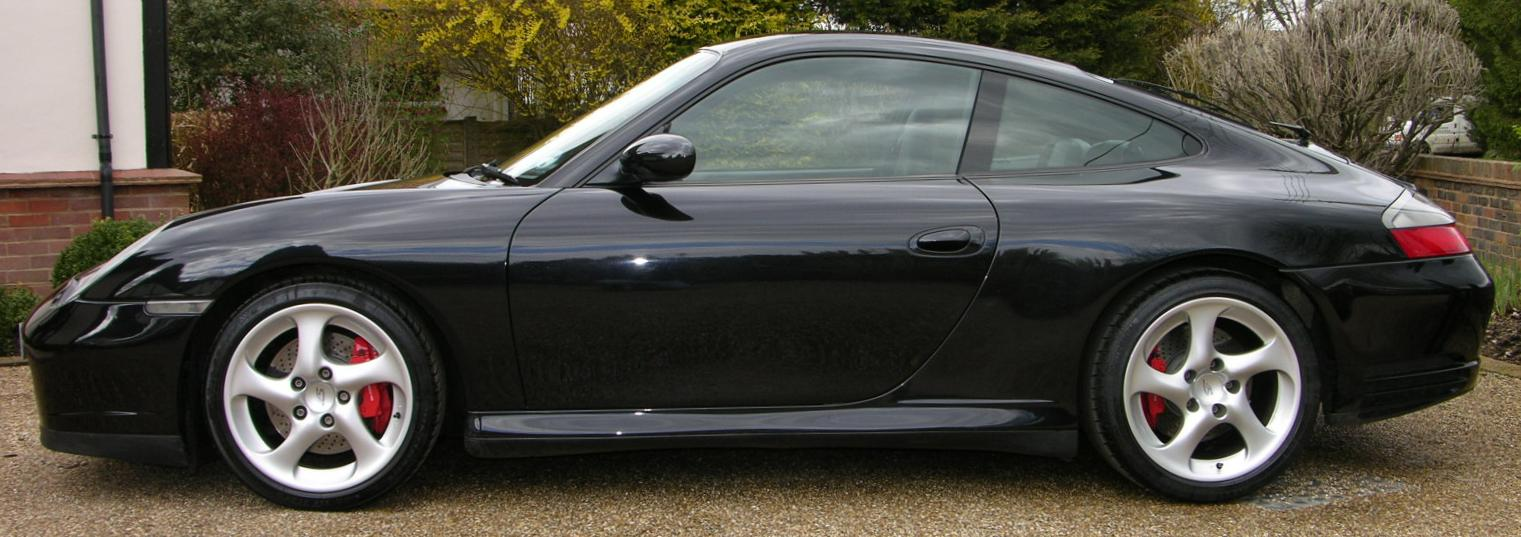
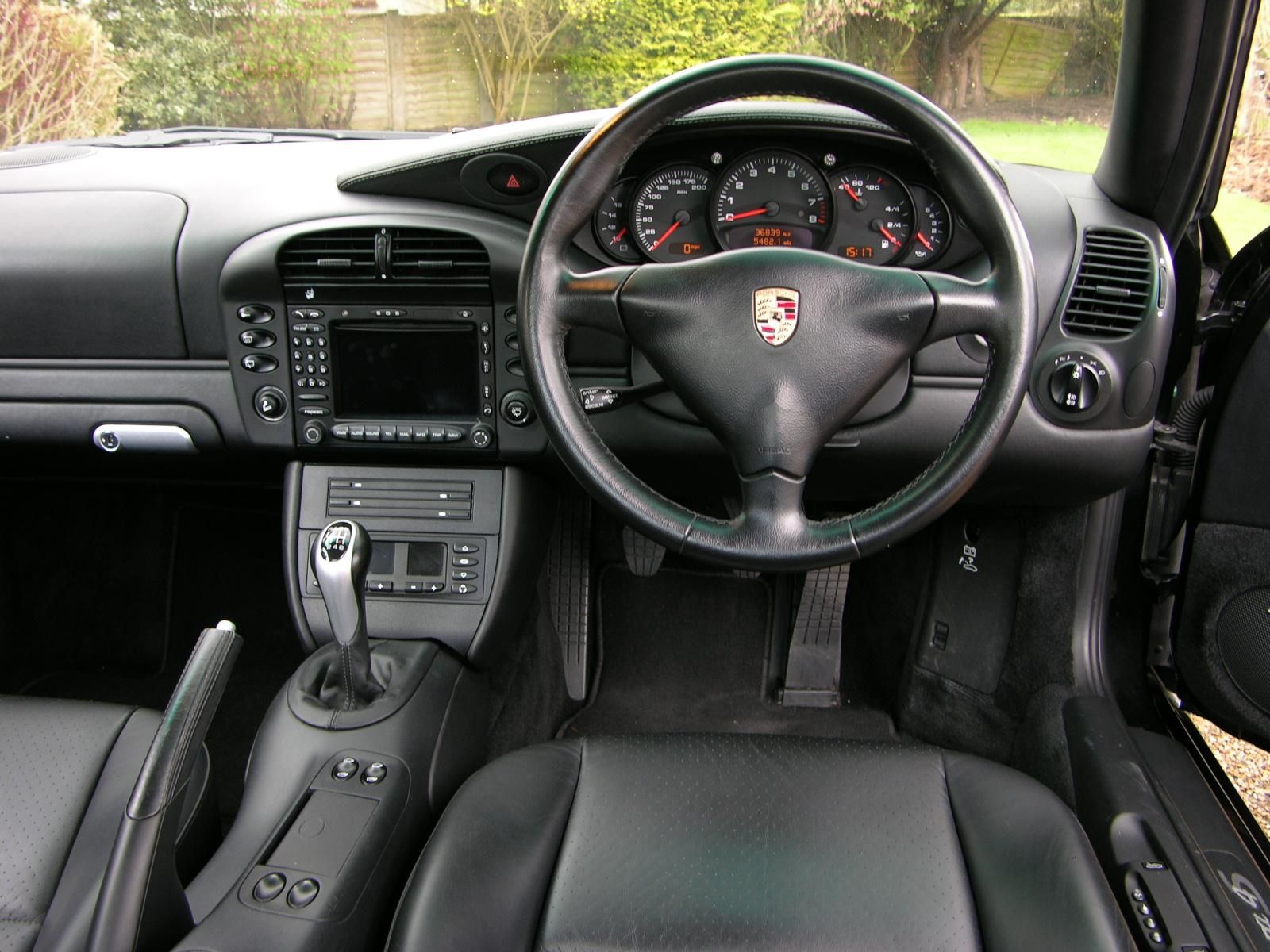

Porsche 911 Carrera 4S (post facelift model)

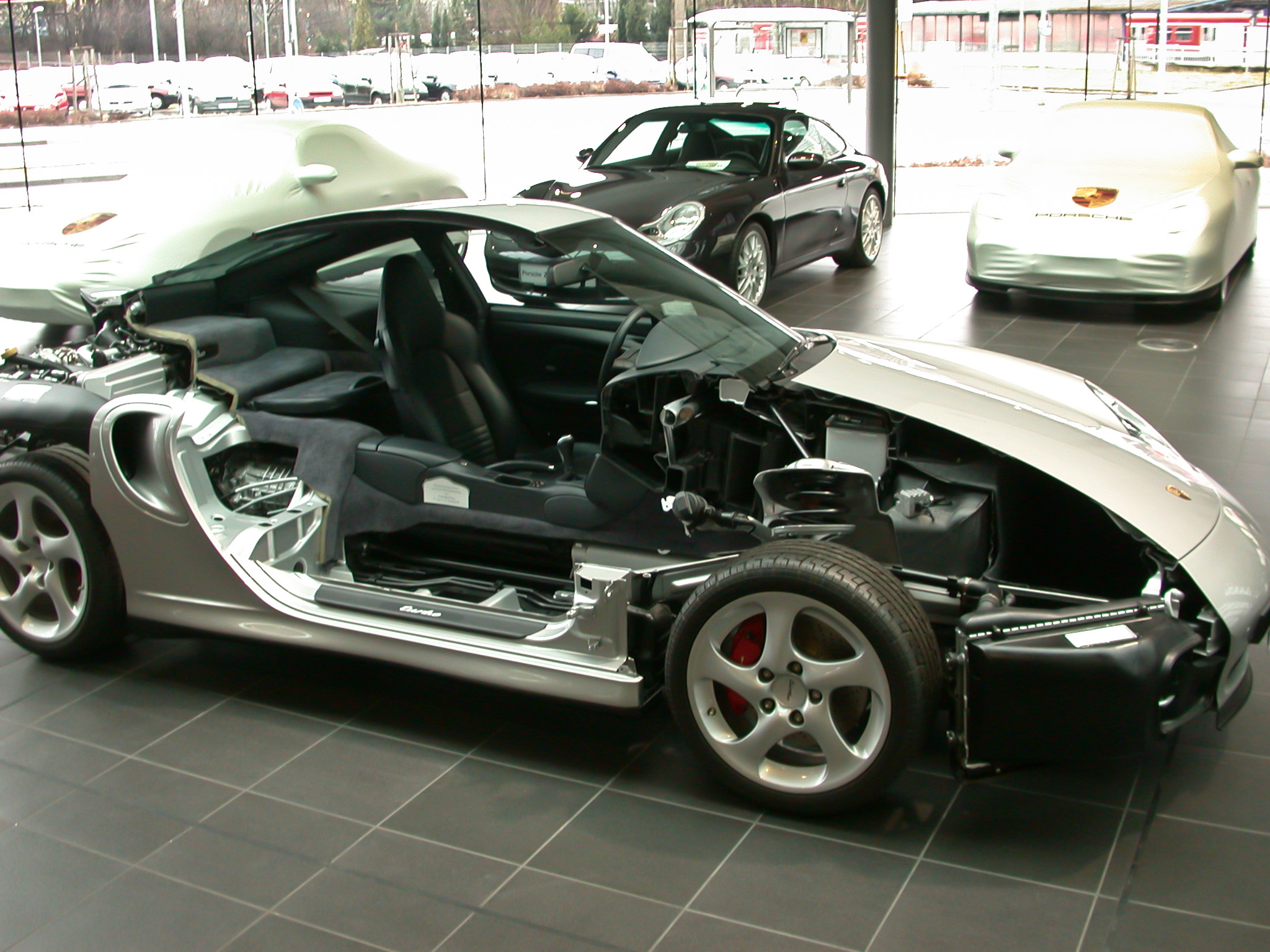
Porsche 996 Turbo, sectioned for display purposes

During the 1990s, Porsche was facing financial troubles and rumours of a proposed takeover were being spread. The signature air-cooled flat-6 of the 911 was reaching the limits of its potential as made evident by the 993. Stricter emissions regulations worldwide further forced Porsche to think of a replacement of the air-cooled unit. In order to improve manufacturing processes, Porsche took the aid of leading Japanese car manufacturer Toyota, whose consultants would assist in the overhaul of the Zuffenhausen manufacturing facility, introducing mass production techniques that would allow Porsche to carry out production processes more efficiently. Porsche had realised that in order to keep the 911 in production, it would need radical changes. This led to the development of the 996. The sharing of development between the new 911 and the entry level Boxster model allowed Porsche to save development costs. This move also resulted in interchangeable parts between the two models bringing down maintenance costs.

The Porsche 996 was a new design developed by Pinky Lai under Porsche design chief Harm Lagaay from 1992 to 2006; it was the first 911 that was completely redesigned, and carried over little from its predecessor as Porsche wanted the design team to design a 911 for the next millennium. Featuring an all new body, interior, and the first water-cooled engine, the 996 replaced the 993 from which only the front suspension, rear multi-link suspension, and a 6-speed manual transmission were retained in revised form. The 996 had a drag coefficient of Cd=0.30 resulting from hours spent in the wind tunnel. The 996 is 185 mm (7 in) longer and 40 mm (2 in) wider than its predecessor. It is also 45% stiffer courtesy of a chassis formed from high-strength steel. Additionally, it is 50 kg (110 lb) lighter despite having additional radiators and coolant.

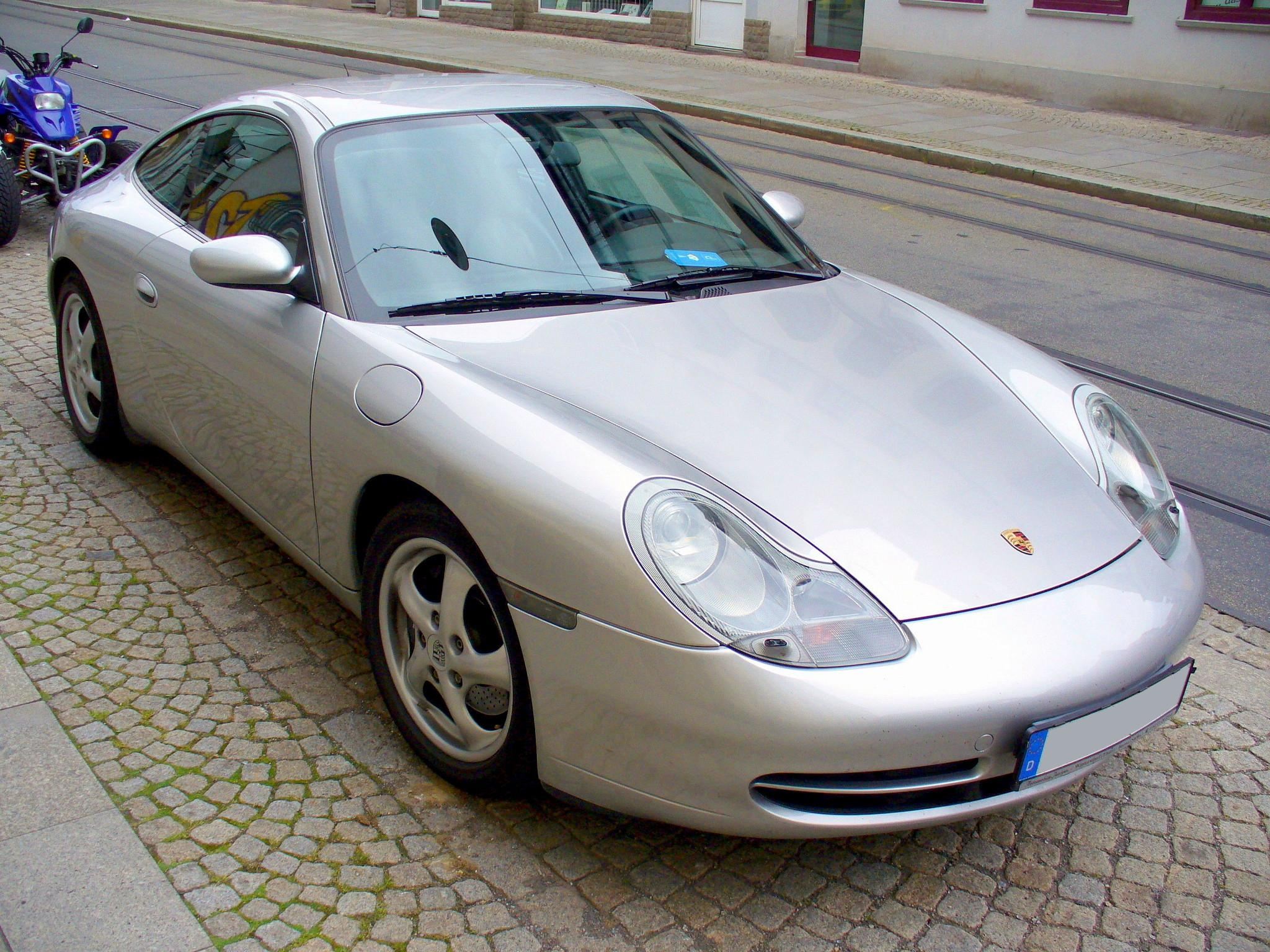
The front end of the early 996 Carrera models shared with the entry-level Boxster was highly controversial among Porsche customers

The 996 was initially available in a coupé or a cabriolet bodystyle with rear-wheel drive, and later with four-wheel drive, utilising a 3.4 litre flat-6 engine generating a maximum power output of 221 kW (300 PS; 296 hp). The 996 had a similar front end as the entry-level Boxster. After requests from the Carrera owners about their premium cars looking like a "lower priced car that looked just like theirs did", Porsche redesigned the headlamps of the Carrera in 2002 similar to the high performance Turbo's headlamps. The design for the initial "fried egg" shaped headlamps could be traced back to the 1997 911 GT1 race car.

In 2000, Porsche introduced the 996 Turbo, equipped with a four-wheel-drive system and a 3.6-litre, twin-turbocharged and intercooled flat-six engine generating a maximum power output of 309 kW (420 PS; 414 hp), making the car capable of accelerating from 0–97 km/h (0–60 mph) in 4.2 seconds. An X50 option, which included larger turbochargers and intercoolers along with revised engine control software, became available from the factory in 2002, increasing power output to 331 kW (450 PS; 444 hp). In 2005, Porsche introduced the Turbo S, which had the X50 option included as standard equipment, with the formerly optional Carbon fibre-reinforced Silicon Carbide (C/SiC) composite ceramic brakes (PCCB) also included as standard.

In 2000, power output on the base Carrera model was increased to 224 kW (305 PS; 300 hp), however weight also increased to 1,370kg. 2001 marked the final year of production for the base Carrera 4 Coupé in narrow body format.

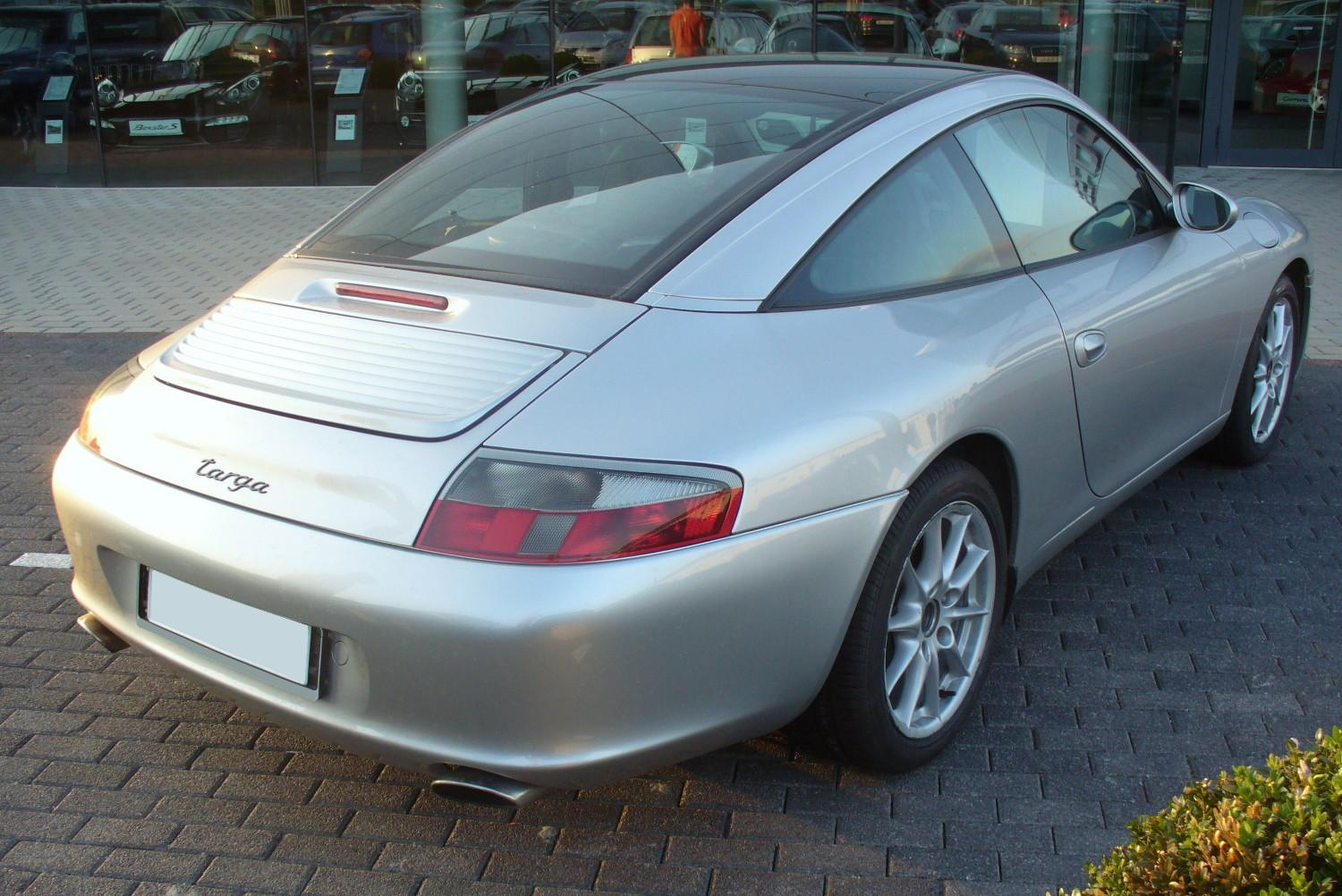
The 996 Targa used the same sliding roof mechanism as its predecessor

In 2002, the standard Carrera models underwent the above-mentioned facelift. In addition, engine capacity of the M96 engine was also increased to 3.6-litres across the range, yielding gains of 11 kW (15 PS; 15 hp) for the naturally aspirated models. 2002 also marked the start of the production of the 996 based Targa model, with a sliding glass "green house" roof system as introduced on its predecessor. It also features a rear glass hatch that gave the driver access to the storage compartment. Also in 2002, the Carrera 4S model was first introduced. The C4S, as it is called among the enthusiasts, shares the wide-body look of the Turbo as well as the brakes and suspension.

== Turbo ==
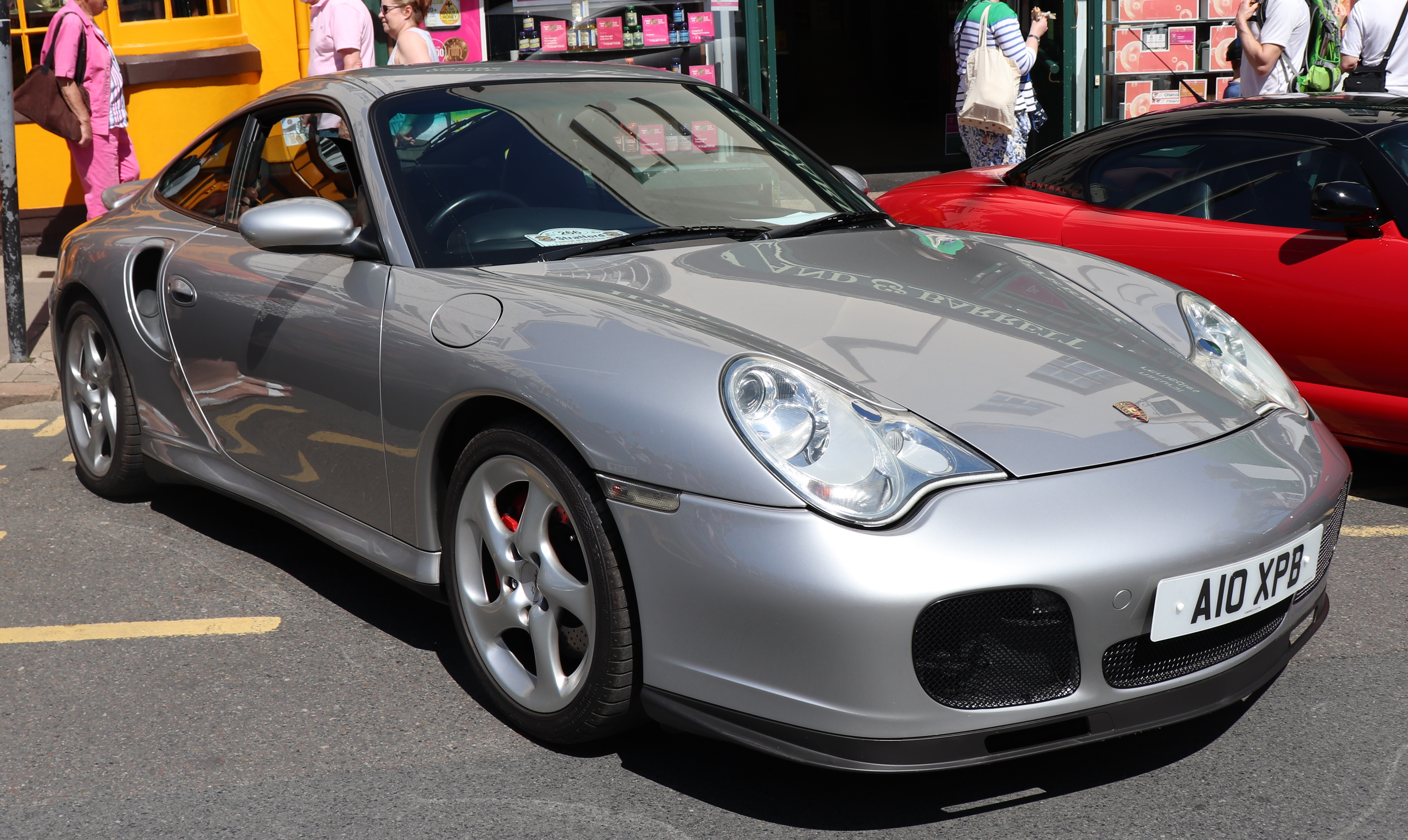

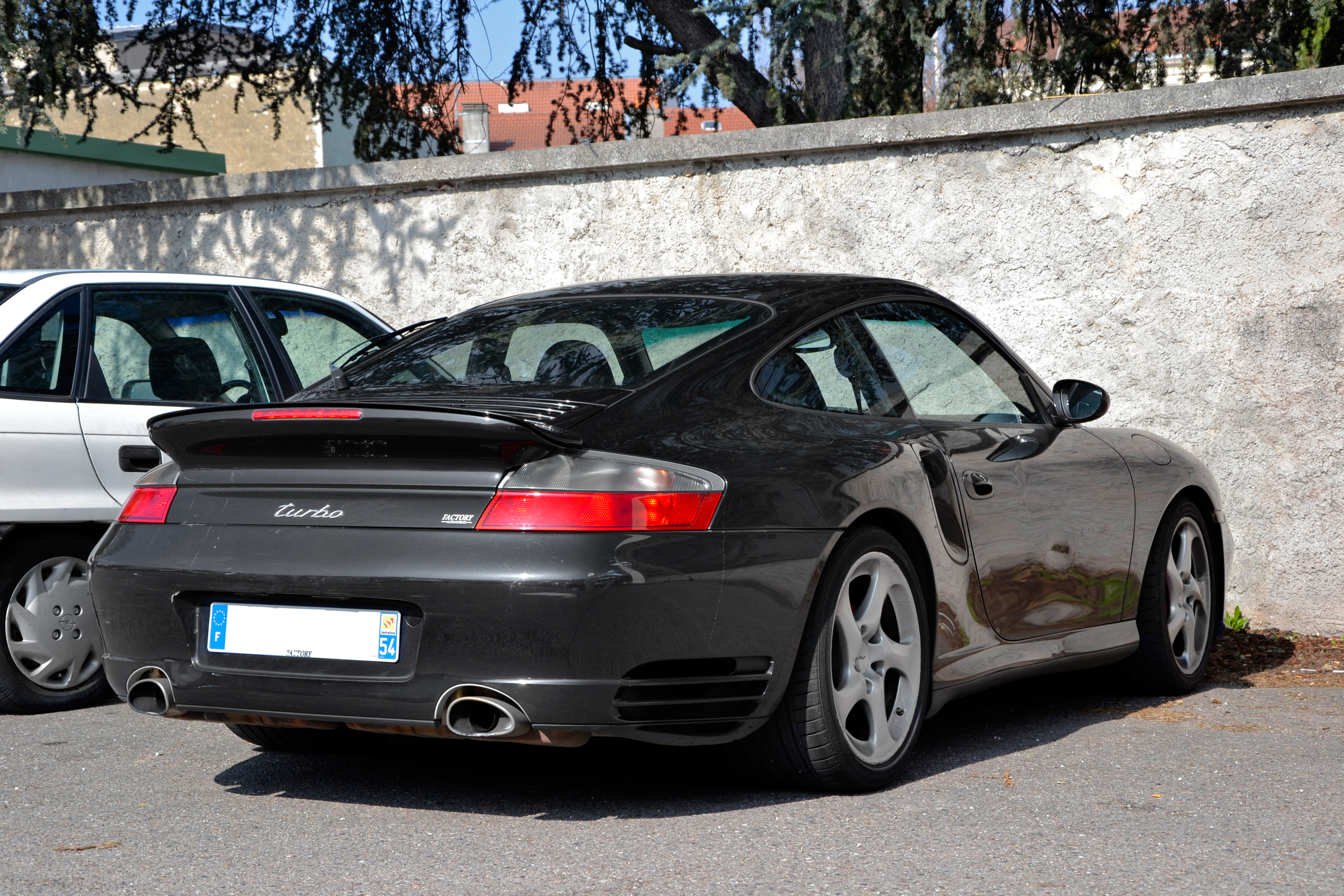
Porsche 911 (996) Turbo

The 996 Turbo debuted at the Frankfurt Auto show in September 1999 and went on sale in the US in summer of 2000 as a 2001 model. The Turbo is powered by a water-cooled twin-turbocharged and intercooled 3.6-litre flat-6 engine derived from the 1998 Le Mans winning 911 GT1 race car. The engine is rated at 309 kW (420 PS; 414 hp) at 6,000 rpm and 415 lb⋅ft (563 N⋅m) of torque. It features an all-wheel drive system and was available with either a 6-speed manual or a 5-speed Tiptronic transmission. It has revised styling and a wider stance than the naturally aspirated 996 Carrera models, along with new bi-xenon headlamps and a retractable rear wing. The Turbo also came with VarioCam Plus and stability management, and on the US models, an electronically adjustable rear spoiler was included that would rise at a speed of 76 mph (122 km/h) and lower at 36 mph (58 km/h). The bodywork was also revised to allow airflow to 3 radiators up front and to accommodate 18-inch wheels and tyres.

In 2002, the X50 package was offered as an option on the Turbo that included larger K24 turbochargers and intercoolers, a revised ECU and quad-pipe exhaust that raised power output to 331 kW (450 PS; 444 hp). Other features introduced in 2002 were a glove box, center-mounted cup holders, an optional Bose stereo and rain-sensing wipers.

In 2003, Porsche North America restated their horsepower numbers due to SAE changes. The Turbo was still listed at 415 hp, the X50 option was now listed at 444 hp.

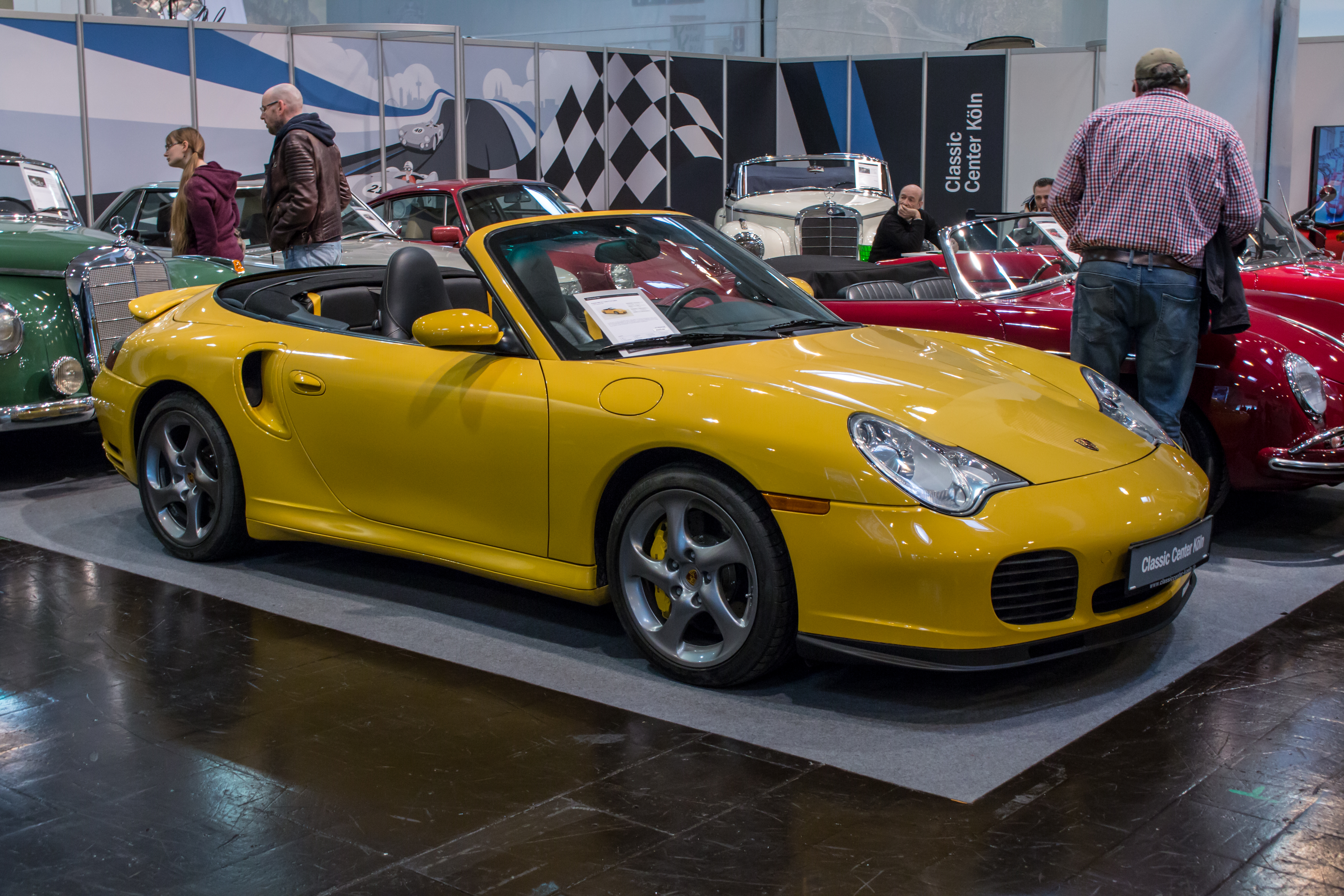
Porsche 911 (996) Turbo Cabriolet

The Turbo Cabriolet was introduced for the 2004 model year and was the first mass-produced Turbo Cabriolet model since the 1989 930 Turbo Cabriolet.

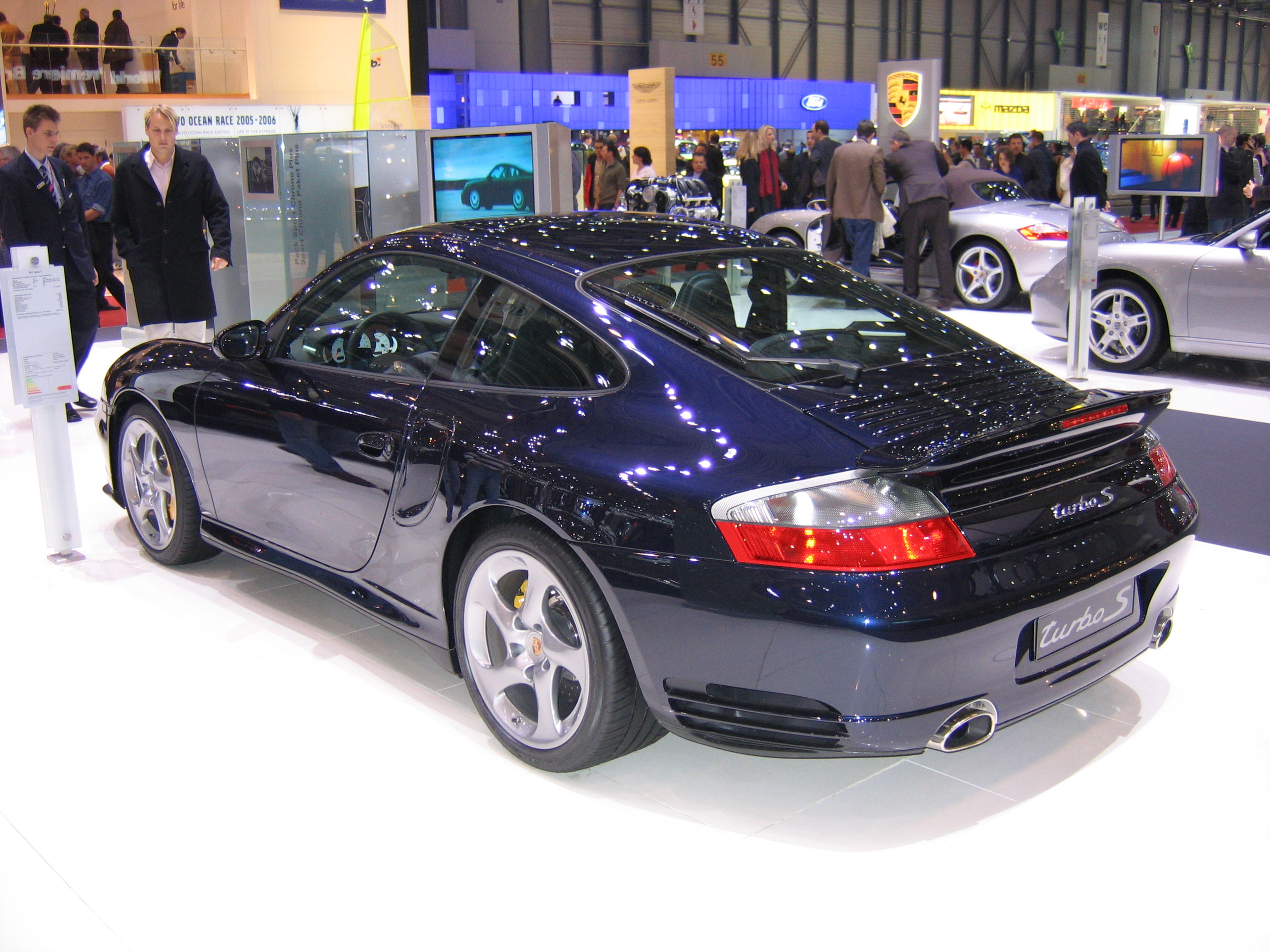
Porsche 911 (996) Turbo S

In 2005, Porsche introduced the Turbo S model available as either a coupé or cabriolet. The Turbo S was essentially a 996 Turbo with the X50 option but also included PCCB, 6-disc CD changer and aluminum-faced instruments.

== GT variants ==
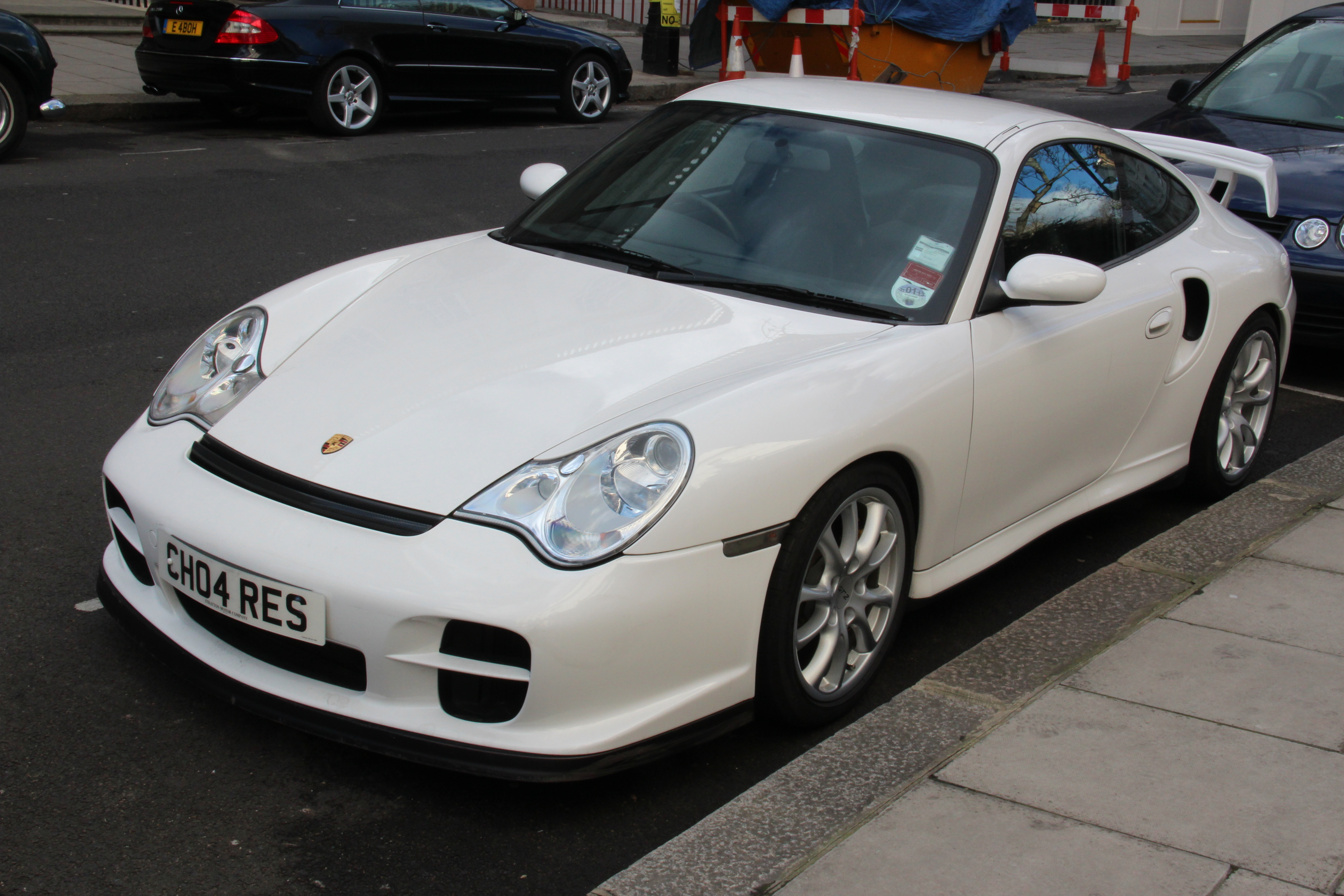
996 GT2 (2003)

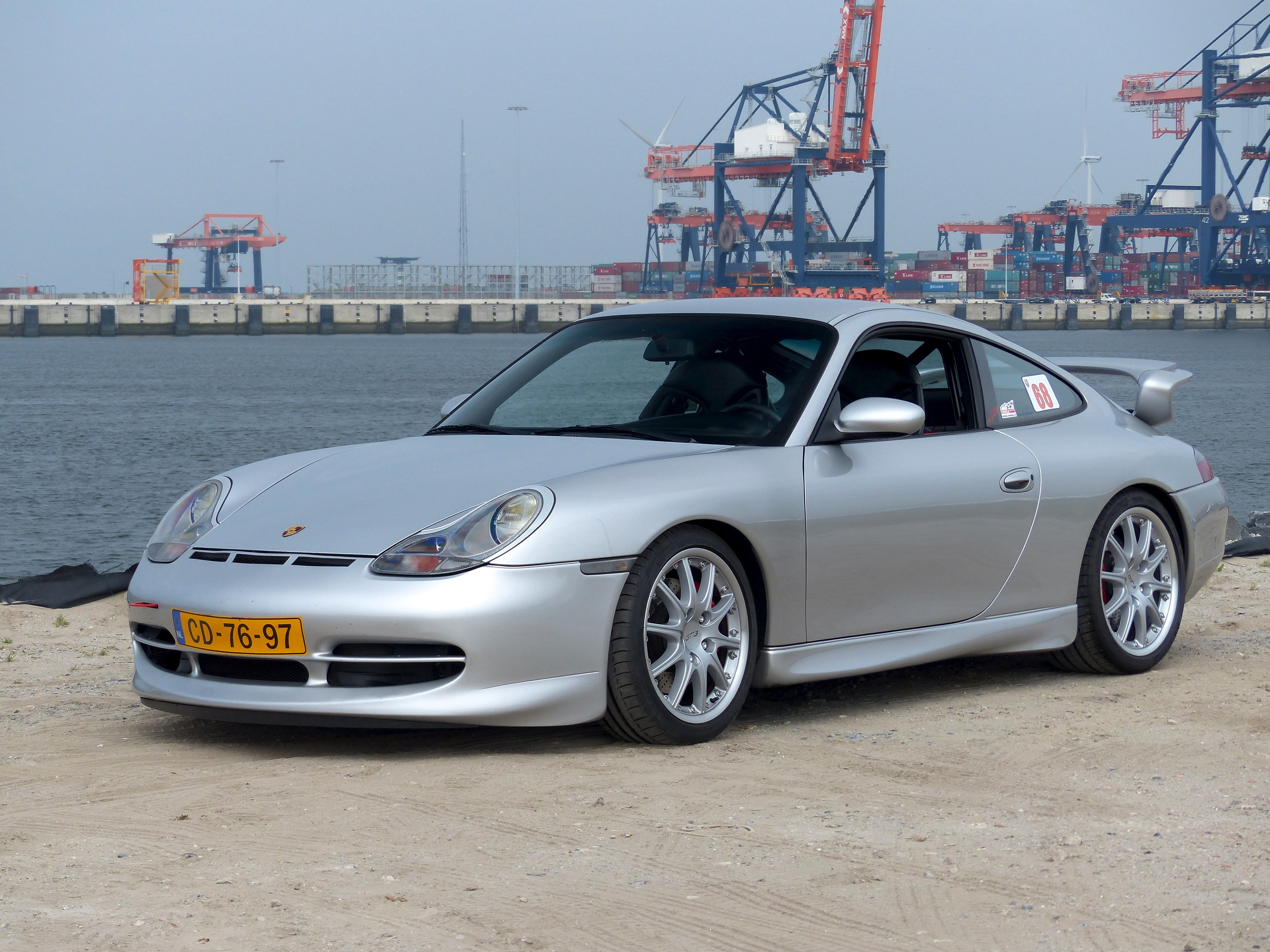
996 GT3 (1999)

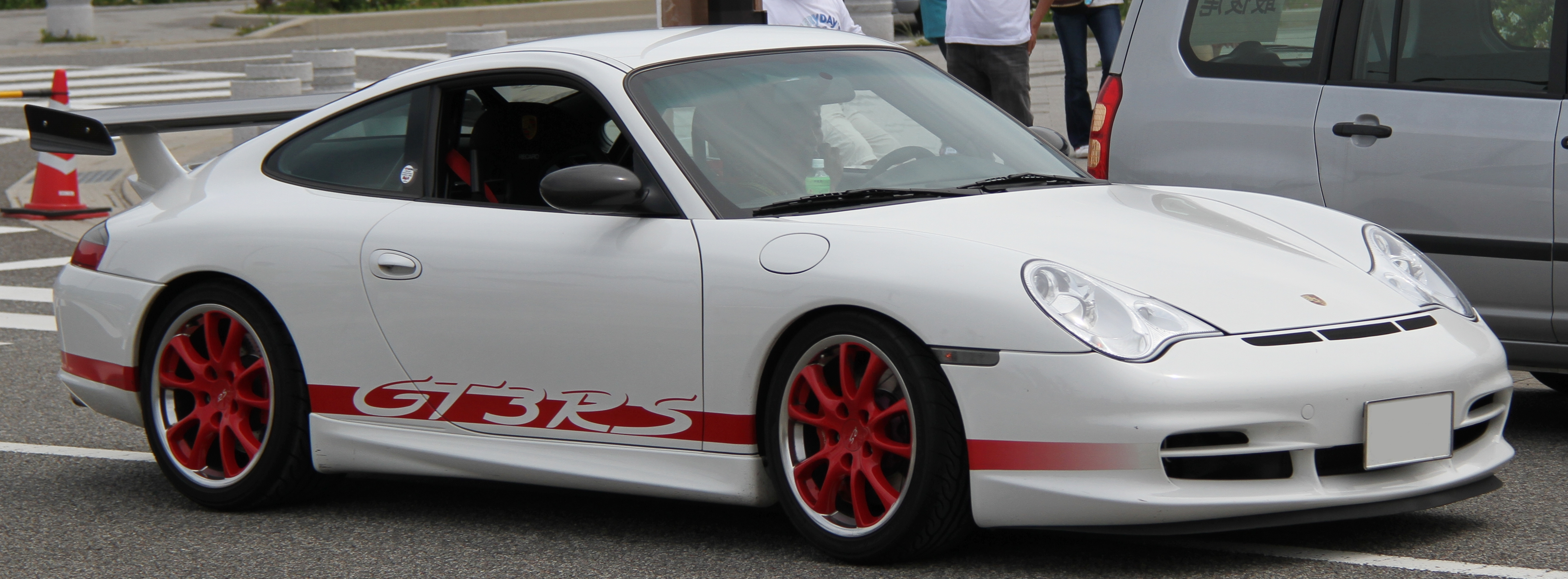
996 GT3 RS (2003)

The 996 platform was used as the basis for two lightweight GT variants called the GT2 and the GT3. The GT3 was based on the standard 996 Carrera, but was stripped of a great deal of equipment for weight savings, featuring stiffer, adjustable suspension and upgraded brakes. The GT3 used the bodyshell of the four-wheel-drive Carrera 4, which incorporated additional front-end stiffening. The GT3 was produced in two versions. The first, commonly referred to as the Mk.I GT3, was introduced in 1999 in all markets, except North America. It featured a naturally aspirated 3.6-litre flat-six engine generating a maximum power output of 265 kW (360 PS; 355 hp). This engine was shared with the 996 Turbo and was a derivative of the engine developed for the 911 GT1 race car. The Mk.II GT3 variant was based on the second generation of the 996, and featured updated aerodynamics, and a more powerful version of the 3.6 L engine from the MK.I, now rated at 280 kW (381 PS; 375 hp). The Mk.II was the first GT3 marketed in the North America. An Mk.II GT3 was tested in 2004 and accelerated from 0–97 km/h (0–60 mph) in 4.0 seconds, and produced 1.03 g on the skidpad, the second highest number ever recorded by a street-legal vehicle at the time.

The turbocharged counterpart to the GT3, the GT2, was rear-wheel drive as well, to save weight and to avoid power losses through the transmission (This is primarily due to the fact that the GT2 was built to compete in GT2 class racing, which restricted the use of an all-wheel-drive system). The GT2 received an added group of aerodynamic body parts, and a re-tuned version of the 996 Turbo's 3.6 litre, twin-turbocharged engine featuring larger turbochargers and intercoolers, a revised intake and exhaust system and re-programmed engine control software. The result was 356 kW (484 PS; 477 hp) at 5,700 rpm and 640 N⋅m (472 lbf⋅ft) at 3,500 to 4,500 rpm, enough to launch the car from 0–97 km/h (0–60 mph) in 3.9 seconds and to a top speed of 315 km/h (196 mph). Bigger wheels and tyres along with lightweight ceramic brakes were standard. The GT2's fixed rear wing (made of CFRP for the post-2003 cars) appears to be a concession to racing rules that usually outlaw adjustable aerodynamic components. The GT2 had no rear seat and no air conditioning and came with a factory installed roll cage. Both the GT3 and GT2 were available only with a 6-speed manual transmission.

The Turbo, GT2 and GT3 models use the Aluminum crankcase of the air-cooled 911 with its true dry sump oiling system. The six separate individual Nikasil lined cylinders in this engine are covered with two separately installed water jackets each covering a bank of 3 cylinders on each side of the engine, thus adding water cooling to a crankcase originally designed for air-cooled cylinders (the standard 996 Carrera engine has the cylinders and water jackets cast together with the crankcase).

== Special editions ==
Porsche offered a special edition of the 996 for the year 2000. The car, named the 911 Millennium edition was based on the Carrera 4 coupé. Only 911 cars were made. It came with polished “turbo look” wheels.

This special edition was finished in Violet Chromaflair paint with natural leather interior and dark burr maple trim. The car was available with a Tiptronic or six-speed manual gearbox. A number plate on the center console and a unique "911" badge on the engine lid and lettering on the door sills make this special edition easy to identify from other base Carrera models.

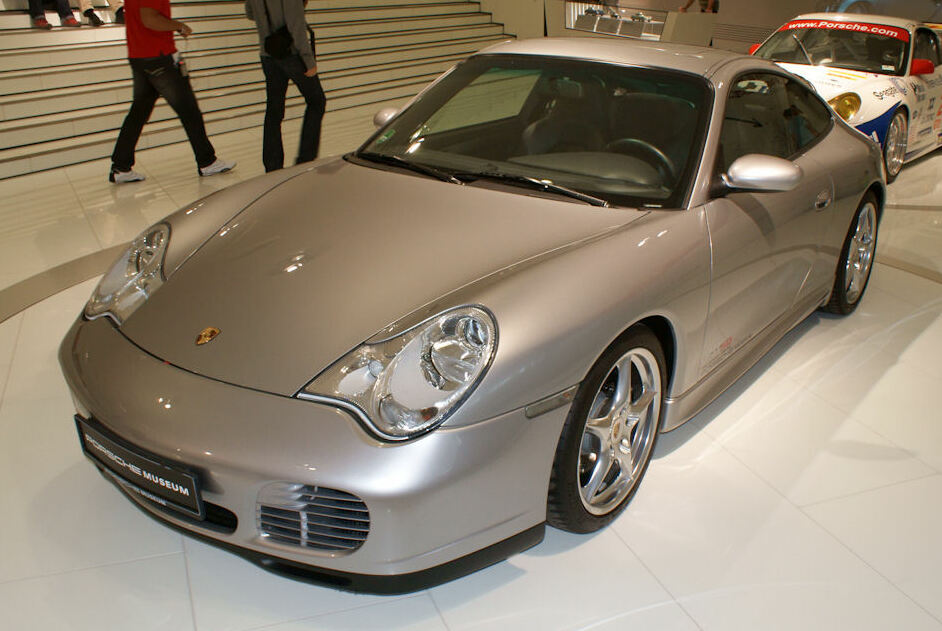
Porsche 40 Jahre 911

Porsche celebrated the 911's 40-year history in 2003, using the slogan, "40 Jahre 911/40 Years of the 911". The company also introduced the 996 "40th Anniversary Edition" for model year 2004. This model has the 996 Turbo's front-end, and was available only in GT Silver metallic paint. Other unique features included: X51 power kit, turbo radiators, limited slip differential, sport suspension, polished 5-spoke alloy wheels (unique to this model), GT3 side skirts, natural gray leather interior (with matching luggage set), sports seats (there was a power comfort seat option), polished exhaust tips, heated seats (option in Latin America), litronic bi-xenon headlights, special dynamic sealed panels, and a special "40 Jahre 911" logo on the engine cover. The power was increased to 254 kW (345 PS; 341 hp). Only 1,963 units were made, to commemorate 1963—the year in which the 911 was first introduced.

== Mechanical issues ==
The Porsche 911 996 model equipped with the engine code M96.01 and M96.02 3.4 litre engines and M96.03 and M96.04 3.6 litre engines, produced between 1998 and 2005, is known for some mechanical issues including problems with the rear main seal (RMS), cylinder cracking, slipped sleeves, and bore scoring, and last, the intermediate shaft (IMS) bearing. The rear main seal issue in some models was due to improper machining, requiring engine replacement to correct for chronic RMS leaks. Porsche did redesign the rear main seal and the most current PTFE seal addresses most RMS issues. Some early 996 engined M96.01 and M96.02 3.4 litre models were sleeved from the factory to correct for manufacturing issues, but some of these sleeves can drop, referred to as a slipped sleeve failure. Cracked or scored cylinders are also common with the 996's 3.4 and 3.6 litre engines that can result in intermix of the engine oil and coolant, or in the case of bore scoring, excessive piston noise, oil consumption, and smoking can occur. The most well-known 996 M96.01 and M96.02 3.4 litre and M96.03 and M96.04 3.6 litre engine issues is that of the intermediate shaft bearing, which was the subject of The Eisen class action lawsuit. IMS failure rates of up to 8% were disclosed during the discovery process. These mechanical issues are very rare (<1%) in early MY98 models with a dual-row IMS bearing, and do not apply to the Hans Mezger designed Mezger GT3, Turbo, and GT2 engine models.

== Statistics ==
Specifications for the MkI, EU spec 996 models:

Model	Power output (in metric), Engine	0–100 km/h (62 mph) acceleration (seconds)	Top Speed
911 Carrera	221 kW (300 PS) at 6,800 rpm, 3.4L integrated dry-sump	5.2	280 km/h (170 mph)
911 Carrera 4	221 kW (300 PS) at 6,800 rpm, 3.4L integrated dry-sump	5.2	274 km/h (170 mph)

Specifications for the MkII, EU spec 996 models:

Model	Power output (in metric), Engine	0–100 km/h (62 mph) acceleration (seconds)	Top Speed
911 Carrera	235 kW (320 PS) at 6,800 rpm, 3.6L integrated dry-sump	4.9	286 km/h (178 mph)
911 Carrera 4S	235 kW (320 PS) at 6,800 rpm, 3.6L integrated dry-sump	5.0	280 km/h (174 mph)
911 "40 Jahre"	254 kW (345 PS) at 6,800 rpm, 3.6L integrated dry-sump	4.8	290 km/h (180 mph)
911 Targa	235 kW (320 PS) at 6,800 rpm, 3.6L integrated dry-sump	5.2	280 km/h (174 mph)
911 Turbo	309 kW (420 PS) at 6,000 rpm, 3.6L dry-sump	4.2	310 km/h (190 mph)
911 Turbo X50	331 kW (450 PS) at 6,000 rpm, 3.6L dry-sump	4.0	309 km/h (192 mph)
911 Turbo S	331 kW (450 PS) at 6,000 rpm, 3.6L dry-sump	3.9	317 km/h (197 mph)
911 GT3	265 kW (360 PS) at 7,400 rpm, 3.6L dry-sump	4.5	310 km/h (190 mph)
911 GT3 RS	280 kW (381 PS) at 7,400 rpm, 3.6L dry-sump	4.4	310 km/h (190 mph)
911 GT2	356 kW (484 PS) at 5,700 rpm, 3.6L dry-sump	3.9	314 km/h (195 mph)
911 Turbo Cabriolet	309 kW (420 PS) at 6,000 rpm, 3.6L dry-sump	4.4	301 km/h (187 mph)
911 Turbo X50 Cabriolet	331 kW (450 PS) at 6,000 rpm, 3.6L dry-sump	4.2	304 km/h (189 mph)
911 Turbo S Cabriolet	331 kW (450 PS) at 6,000 rpm, 3.6L dry-sump	4.1	310 km/h (190 mph)
911 Carrera Cabriolet	235 kW (320 PS) at 6,800 rpm, 3.6L integrated dry-sump	4.9	283 km/h (176 mph)
911 Carrera 4 Cabriolet	235 kW (320 PS) at 6,800 rpm, 3.6L integrated dry-sump	5.2	282 km/h (175 mph)
911 Carrera 4S Cabriolet	235 kW (320 PS) at 6,800 rpm, 3.6L integrated dry-sump	5.4	277 km/h (172 mph)

- Integrated dry-sump is Porsche's name for a dry sump lubrication system integrated within the engine block, i.e. no separate oil reservoir.

Production Numbers:

Year	Production numbers (units)
1997	14
1998	9,248
1999	28,040
2000	20,979
2001	27,275
2002	33,013
2003	29,536
2004	23,145
2005	4,012
Total	175,262

== Individual vehicles ==
=== Movie character ===
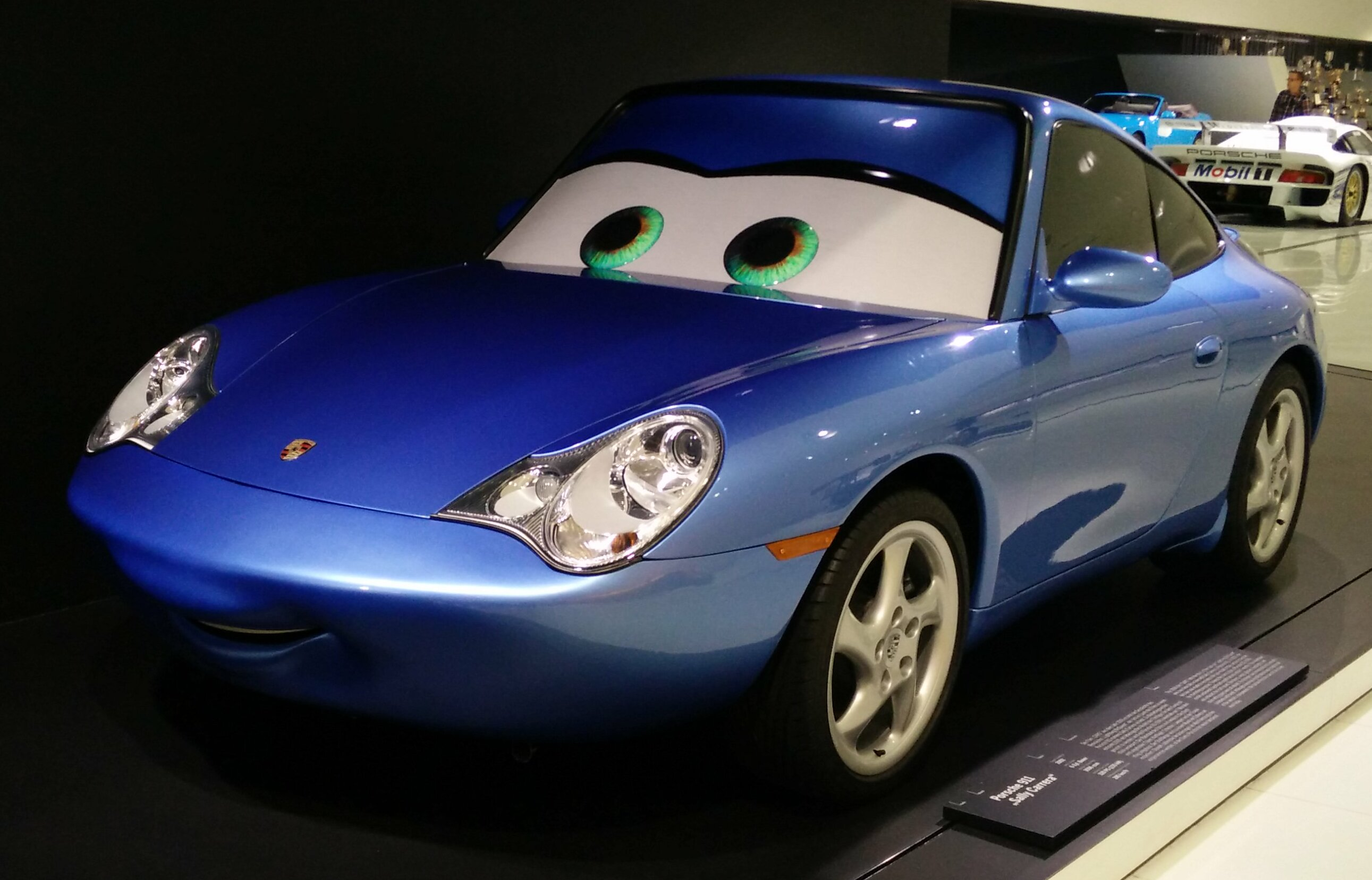
Sally Carrera as a customised 996

Hollywood custom car builder Eddie Paul created a modified 996 Carrera as one of a set of three vehicles for Pixar's 2006 Cars promotional tour. Sally, a blue Porsche 996 designed to closely resemble a 2002 Carrera, is built on a slightly shortened wheelbase; her windshield is tilted closer to vertical (adding a few inches to the car's height) to accommodate the animated character's eyes. The vehicle is currently held in the Porsche Museum in Stuttgart, Germany.

=== Police car ===
In 2007, a motorist's 2001 Porsche 911 was searched during a traffic stop by Hoover, Alabama police. The police department seized the vehicle after they found 10 kilograms of cocaine hidden inside two compartments. Since then the vehicle was redecorated in two-tone police blue with a wing, light bar, and rear window lights. The vehicle was unveiled in 2009 as a Hoover Police Department police car and has appeared at various public events.

== See also ==
- Porsche 911
