= The Hong Kong Award for Young People =

The Hong Kong Award for Young People, formerly known as The Duke of Edinburgh's Award, is one of the active members of the International Award Association. The Hong Kong Award was incepted in 1961.

== History ==
The Duke of Edinburgh's Award was introduced in Hong Kong in 1961, mirroring the British counterpart. Participants who achieved Gold Award would receive their award from the Governor of Hong Kong. In 1997, prior to the handover of Hong Kong to China, the Duke of Edinburgh's Award was renamed the Hong Kong Award for Young People.

== Process ==
The HKAYP, with its unique international principles, cultivates youngsters with perseverance and the spirit of self-challenge. The Award aims at encouraging and motivating young people aged between 14 and 25 to undertake a variety of voluntary and challenging activities. There are three levels of Award: Bronze, Silver and Gold. In order to complete the Bronze and Silver award, four sections must be completed: services, skills, physical recreation and expedition. Additionally, for the Gold award, a residential project is also required.

Currently, there are roughly 53,000 youth participants in Hong Kong. More than 600 different user units, including schools, universities, uniform group youth organisations and community centres, are running the Award Scheme.

The Gold and Silver Award of the HKAYP rank 3rd and 4th respectively under the Self Recommendation Scheme of the Joint University Programmes Admissions System. Since the inception of the Self Recommendation Scheme in 1999, 24 Gold and Silver Award holders admitted to the Chinese University of Hong Kong through the Self Recommendation Scheme.
