= Asian Academy for Sports and Fitness Professionals =

Hong Kong fitness instructor certification body

The Asian Academy for Sports and Fitness Professionals (AASFP) is a fitness instructors certification body founded in Hong Kong in 1992. The academy provides professional education and training programs in Asia.

== Certification Programs ==
AASFP runs a variety of fitness programs which include instructor certification courses in personal fitness training, aerobic and group fitness, yoga, pilates, fit-ball, children's fitness, aquatic fitness, distance running and Muay Thai. AASFP also conducts a number of professional certification courses in such fields as sports massage, sports injury management and nutrition and weight management. Since its establishment, AASFP has conducted programs in China, Hong Kong, Malaysia, Thailand, Singapore and Taiwan. Research of Hong Kong Fitness Guide 2018 (www.fitnessguide.hk) stated that 60% of certified personal trainers are certified by AASFP in Hong Kong.

== Development in China ==
In 2001, AASFP became the first fitness academy to enter China, introducing the concept of “Fitness” to a relatively new but rapidly developing Chinese fitness industry. AASFP worked closely with the China Sports Authorities to set recognized standards for the fitness industry and has conducted fitness education programs in 28 Chinese cities including Beijing, Shanghai, Guangzhou, Nanjing and Xian.

In 2005, AASFP conducted the first major survey of the Chinese fitness industry - creating a statistics report that provided data on the development of fitness clubs all around China. 2005 also marked AASFP's establishment of the first fully equipped fitness academy in Beijing, China - providing a training facility for AASFP students, graduates and national team coaches.

== Major Events & Conferences ==
AASFP holds two major conferences every year: The Asian Fitness Education Expo (AFEEX) in Beijing and the AASFP Fitness Forum in Hong Kong. Both events invite a number of international fitness professionals to present and educate personal trainers and group exercise instructors within the Asian fitness industry. AASFP also participates and provides workshops and seminars in fitness conferences around Asia such as Asiafit and has helped to co-organize Fitness China Beijing.

== AASFP in 2006 ==
In 2006, AASFP was appointed 'Approved Training Provider' by the Register of Exercise Professionals New Zealand (REPs NZ) - providing AASFP-certified personal trainers with a chance to register as a Registered Exercise Professional and train in any of the member countries under the International Confederation of Registers for Exercise Professionals (ICREPs) - which currently includes New Zealand, United Kingdom and Australia.

== External Reference ==
www.aasfp.com
