= Beatrix Pang =

Hong Kong artist

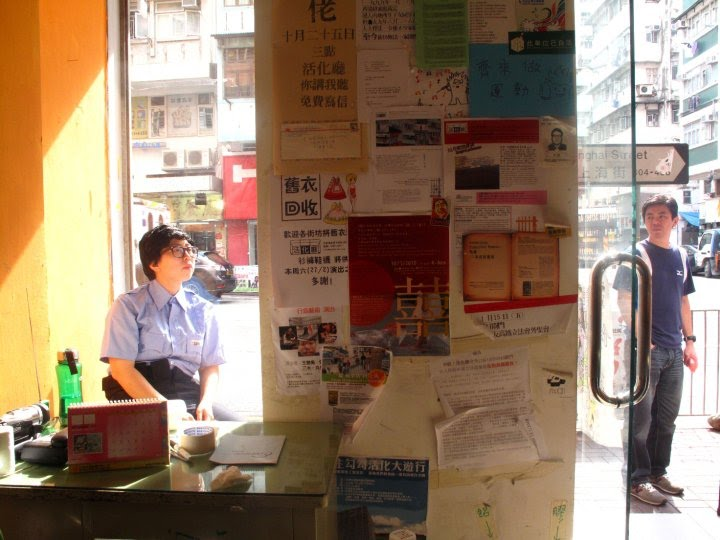
- Beatrix Pang, Performance work SeQ-ing for program See Through at Yau Ma Tei, Hong Kong

Beatrix Pang (Chinese: Pang Sin Kwok 彭倩幗) is a visual artist, cultural producer, educator, and independent publisher based in Hong Kong. Pang's practice has transitioned from photography, lens-based media, and performance to self-publishing, moving image, and community-engaged projects.

== Early life and education ==
They completed a BA in Photographic Design (2000) at the School of Design, Hong Kong Polytechnic University, and an MA in Photography (2005) at the Bergen National Academy of the Arts, Norway. In 2003, Pang received a scholarship from the Ministry of Education and Research of Norway to support her master's degree studies.

== Work ==
Pang's video installation for the Hong Kong Art Biennial 2005, titled "Distance = Time × Speed", explored their journey as an artist from Hong Kong to their time as a graduate student in Norway. In the November 2005 opening of "Beyond: 2nd Guangzhou Triennial" at the Guangdong Museum of Art, Pang collaborated with design professor Matthew Turner and the Asia Art Archive to organize a one-day symposium titled "Trading Places: Cultural Imaginaries of the Pearl River Delta."

In 2009, Pang received the Asian Cultural Council fellowship, supported by The Starr Foundation, to conduct research on community art and photography in the United States. This research led them to focus on strengthening the independent publishing scene upon returning to Hong Kong.

They were a co-founder of KLACK Photography and Cultural Magazine, which released its first issue in the summer of 2010. In 2011, Pang started the independent art publishing project Small Tune Press, which produces artist’s books and zines focusing on photography, drawing, collage, conceptual work, and poetry. Pang established the press to provide a distribution platform for lesser-known artists. The initiative received early encouragement from artist Susanne Bürner, whose book "Vanishing Point: How to Disappear in China without a Trace" was the press's first publication.

In 2017, Pang co-founded Zine Coop, a collective that promotes zine culture in Hong Kong through workshops and international exhibitions. The following year, they co-founded Queer Reads Library with the artist-curator Kaitlin Chan, creating a mobile collection of international queer publications and independent zines.

During the 2019–20 Hong Kong protests, Zine Coop engaged with the movement through independent publishing and curated events, including the international touring exhibition "Freedom-Hi", which traveled to 17 cities to document the region's political context.

== Exhibitions ==
=== Group exhibitions ===
- 2024–25 – How to be Happy Together?, curated by Zairong Xiang, at Para Site, Hong Kong.
- 2024 – (In)directions: Queerness in Chinese Contemporary Photography, at Eli Klein Gallery, New York.
- 2016 – Afterwork, curated by Freya Chou, Cosmin Costinas, Inti Guerrero, and Qinyi Lim, at Para Site, Hong Kong.

== Publications ==
- 2022 – Peer Review: Publishing the Present by Wendy's Subway (New York, USA) Prior to this publication, in July 2020, Wendy's Subway invited Pang to present as part of the panel “Artist-publishers, care, and social action,” organized during the institution's online residency with the Libby Leshgold Gallery and READ Books at Emily Carr University of Art + Design.
- 2019 – A Mobile Publishing Manual by Publication Studio Portable (Hong Kong/ Rotterdam NL)
