= Pinky Lai =

Chinese automotive designer

- Born: 20 March 1951 (age 74); British Hong Kong
- Education: Istituto Superiore per le Industrie Artistiche (ISIA) of Rome Royal College of Art of London
- Occupation: Automotive designer
- Years active: 1980–2014
- Employer(s): Ford of Europe (1980–1983); BMW (1984–1988); Porsche (1989–2014)

Pinky Lai (賴平 Lai Ping, born 20 March 1951) is an automotive designer. Lai is noted for his design work at Ford, BMW and Porsche.

During Lai's tenure at Porsche from January 1989 until his retirement in 2014, he was chief designer responsible for the exterior designs of 996 series of the Porsche 911 as well as both the Porsche 987 Boxster and Cayman.

== Background ==
Born and raised in Quarry Bay, Hong Kong, Lai moved to Rome in 1972, where he studied and received a BA in industrial design at the Istituto Superiore per le Industrie Artistiche. After seeing an opening for car designer at Ford of Germany, in 1978 Lai received a two-year full scholarship for master's degree study on transportation design at the RCA Royal College of Art in London.

In 1980, winner and recipient of the John Ogier Memorial Design Bursary of the Royal Society of Arts.

== Career ==
After his graduation from RCA in 1980, he started working for the Fordwerke in Cologne, Germany. In 1982–83 he went on a joint venture project to work in Ghia Studios (Italy) and Mazda in Japan, where he worked on a specialty car program as a result of winning the internal competition. He worked on the Sierra, Fiesta, Escort, and Scorpio projects.

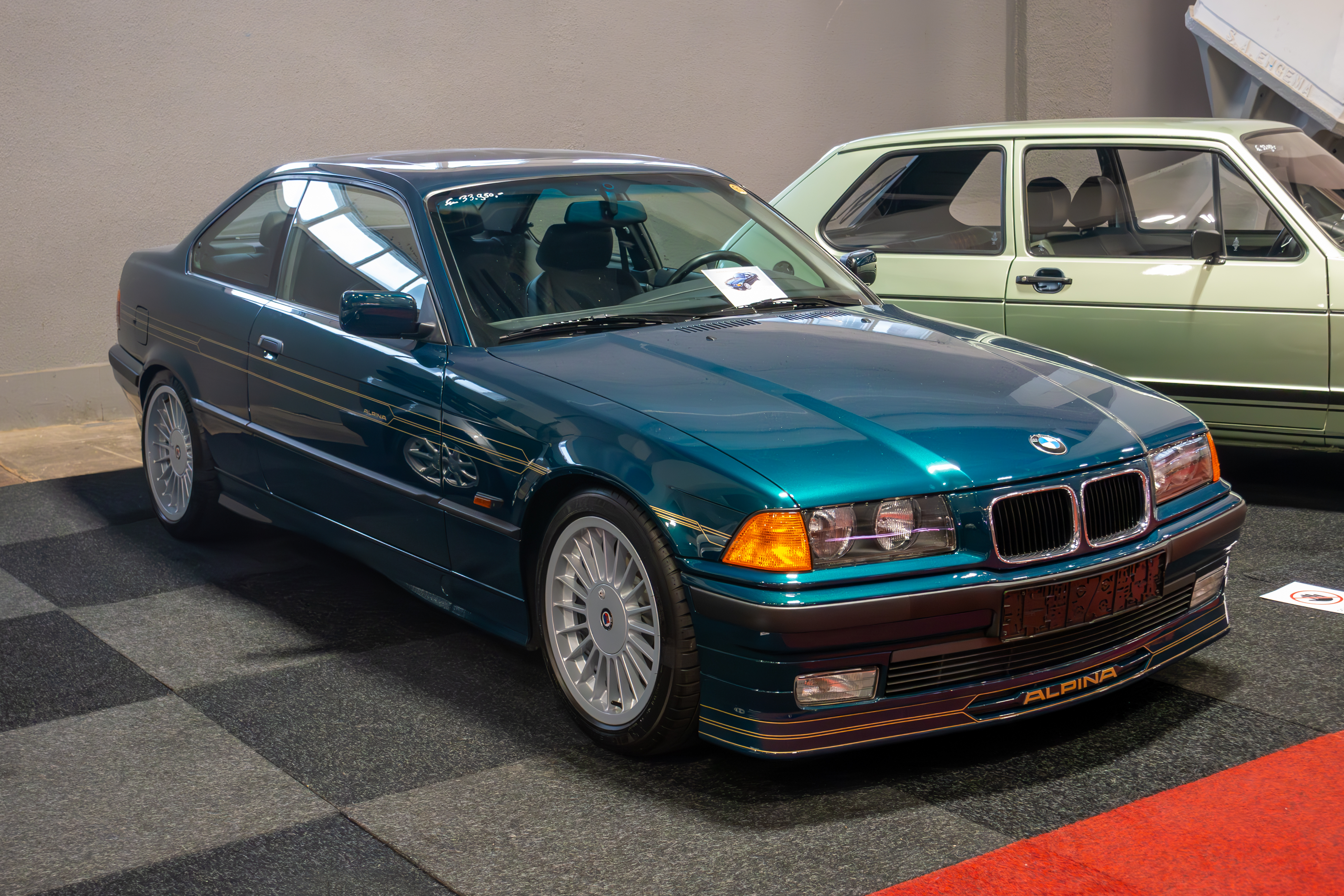
BMW 3 Series (E36)

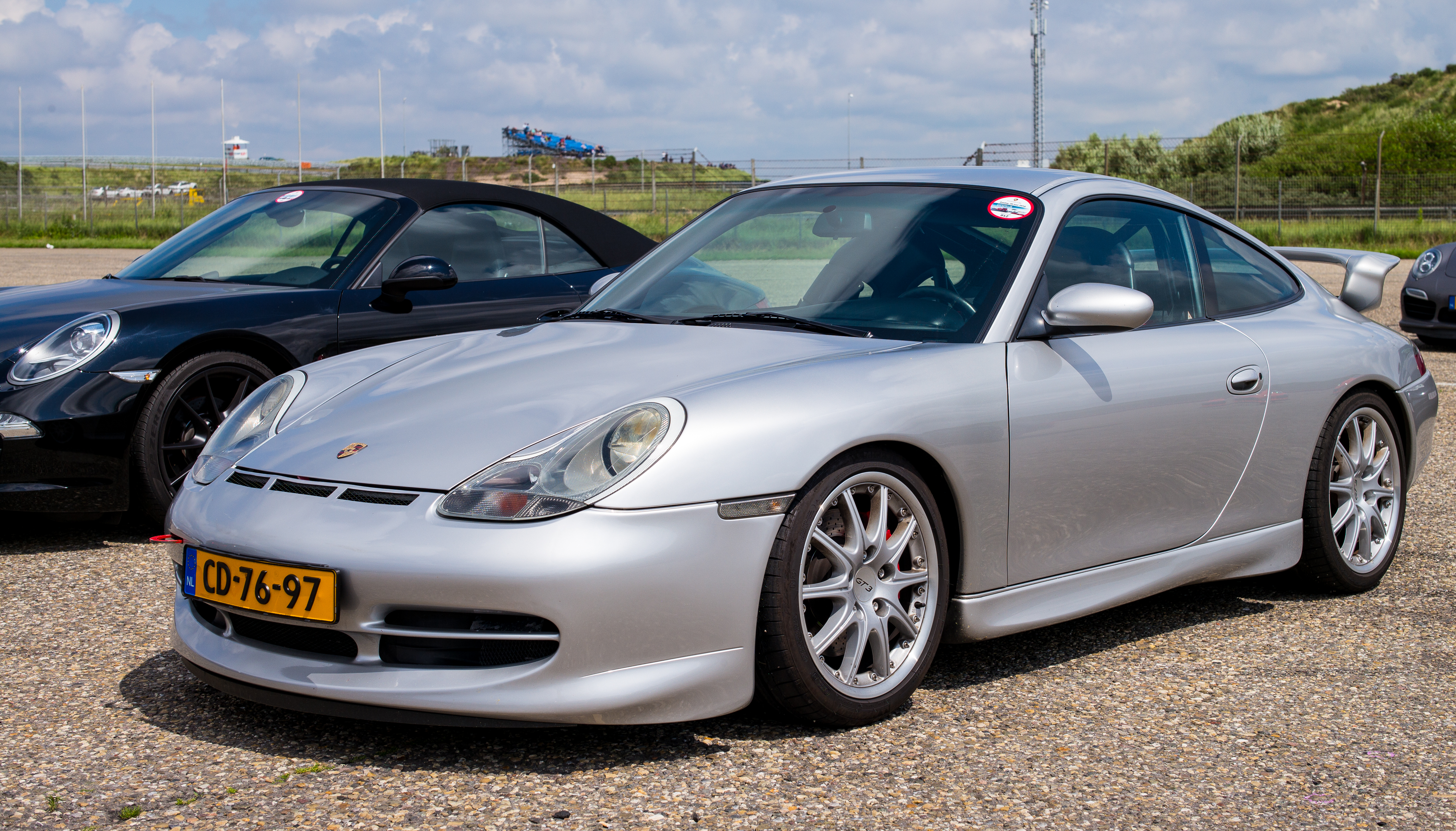
Porsche 911 (996)

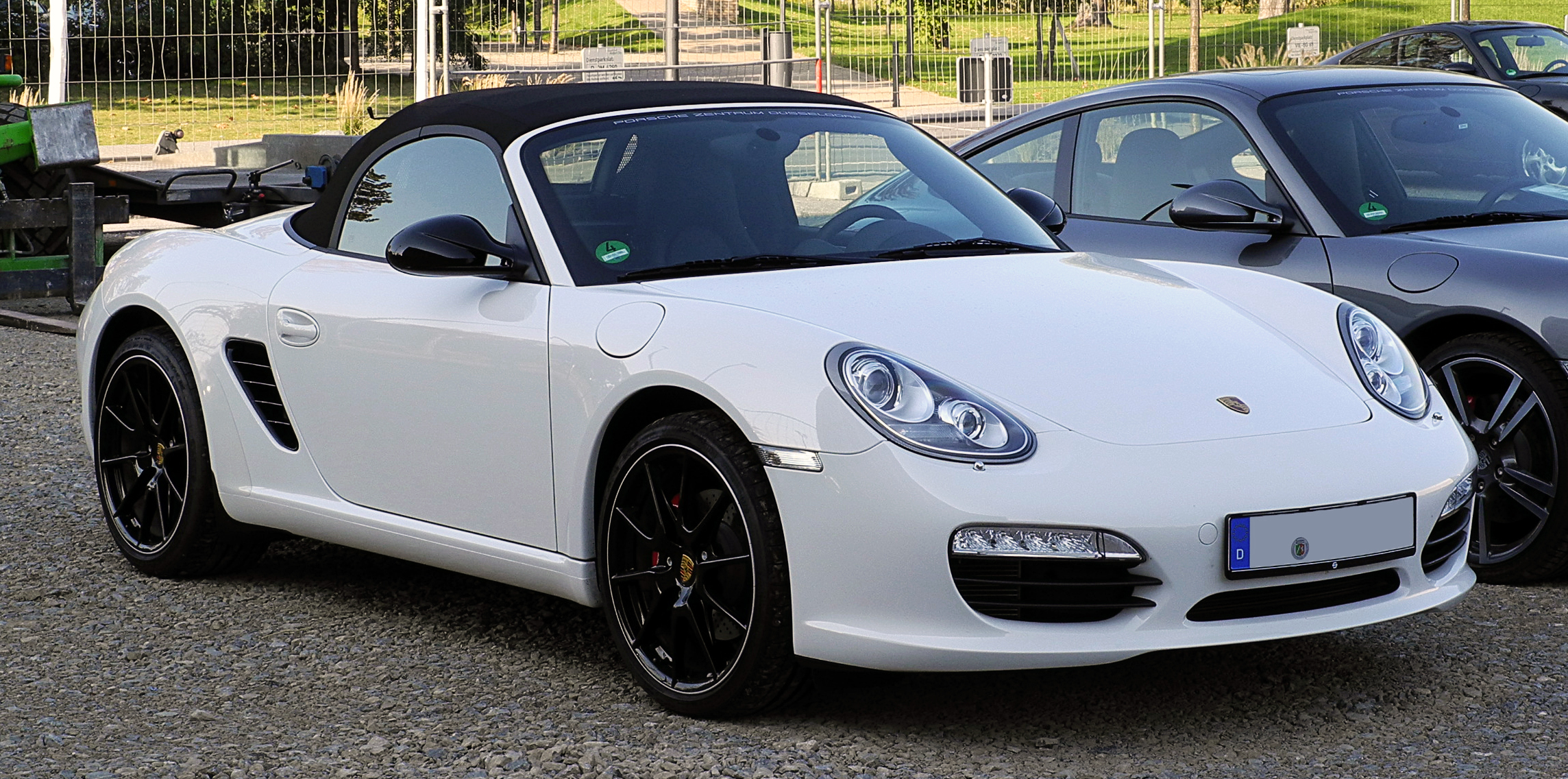
Porsche Boxster (987)

After returning to Germany, he joined BMW in 1984 as a senior designer. He won the design of E36 program (the BMW 3 Series). In 1989, he was invited by the president of R&D of Porsche AG to join the design team Porsche Styling as studio chief. Since then, he has worked on all the models from the factory, from the Boxster to the Cayman, including the revolutionary 996, the first major departure from Ferdinand Alexander "Butzi" Porsche's original design for the 911 in four decades.

Between 1992 and 1995, every Saturday he taught design sketching at the Art Center College of Design in La Tour-de-Peilz, Switzerland.

Since 2004, he was appointed the chief designer for all external projects at Porsche Styling, handling all transportation design for clients from Japan, Korea, China, and Europe. Projects ranged from high-performance motor bike design to design face-lifting of an over-300-meter-long cruise liner.

=== Awards ===
- 1997 911 Carrera L'Automobile Più Bella Del Mondo, Milan;
- 1998 911 C4 Carrera L'Automobile Più Bella Del Mondo, Milan;
- 1998 911 Carrera Design Zentrum Nordrhein-Westfalen, Germany;
- 1998 911 Carrera Chicago Athenaeum; Museum of Architecture, Usa;
- 2000 911 Turbo L'Automobile Più Bella Del Mondo, Milan;
- 2000 911 Turbo Industrie Forum Design Hanover, Germany;
- 2000 911 Carrera(Fl) Autonis (Berlin), Germany;
- 2001 911 Turbo Design Zentrum Nordrhein_Westfalen, Germany;
- 2001 911 Carrera L'Automobile Più Bella Del Mondo, Milan;
- 2002 911 Turbo German Design Council;
- 2001 911 C4s Cabriolet L'Automobile Più Bella Del Mondo, Milan;
- December 2015 Recipient of Lifetime Achievement Award by Hong Kong Design Centre.

=== Speeches ===
Invitations as key-note speaker and distinguished speaker:

- November 2012 WPO (Hong Kong chapter);
- July 2013 Moet Hennessy Gala-Dinner, Taipei, Taiwan;
- April 2014 Oklahoma State University, school of Architecture;
- October 2014 Hong Kong University; Entrepreneurs Organization; Hong Kong Polytechnic university; Stanford University Alumni; Columbia University Alumni; Hong Kong Chinese University;
- December 2015 The Hong Kong University of Science & Technology;
- April 2017 Shanghai Jiao Tong University and Fudan university;
- June 2022 Keynote Speaker at the Royal College of Art China Forum with over 3 million of audience via Zoom;
- July 2022 Invitation by the Royal College of Art Students and Scholars Association (RCACSSA) to hold the Lifetime Honorary Chairman of the Royal College of Art Chinese Alumni Association.

=== Consultancies ===
- 2013 For a major Chinese car manufacturers on Brand Creation/Accessment across the entire range of vehicles – from SUVs to limousines.
- Residential building design Concept consultancy project for a 7-Stars Sun Hung Kai Properties, Hong Kong
