= Porsche Boxster and Cayman (987) =

Sports cars

Porsche 987
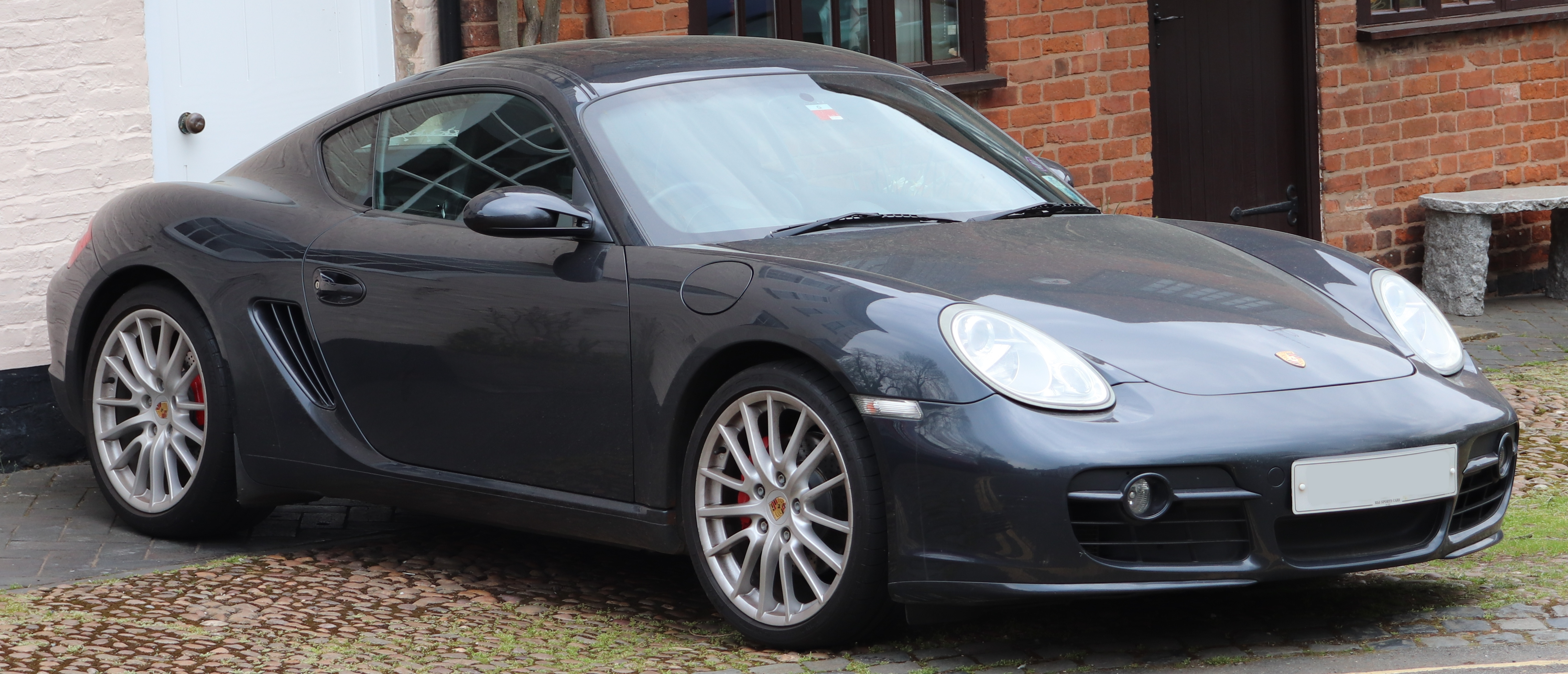
- Porsche Cayman S (987.1)

Overview
- Also called: Boxster / Cayman
- Production: September 2004–2012 (Boxster); August 2005–2012 (Cayman)
- Model years: 2005–2012 (Boxster); 2006–2012 (Cayman)
- Assembly: Germany: Stuttgart, Zuffenhausen; Finland: Uusikaupunki (Valmet)
- Designer: Pinky Lai (Cayman; 2002)

Body and chassis
- Class: Sports car (S)
- Body style: 2-door roadster; 2-door fastback coupé
- Layout: Mid-engine, rear-wheel drive
- Related: Ruf RK; Porsche 997

Powertrain
- Engine: 2.7 L M96.25 / M97.20 flat-6 (2005–2008); 2.9 L M96.26/MA1.20 flat-6 (2009–2012); 3.2 L M96.26 flat-6 (2005–2006); 3.4 L M97.21/M97.22/MA1.21/MA1.22 flat-6 (2007–2012)
- Transmission: 5-speed automatic; 5-speed manual; 6-speed manual; 7-speed PDK

Dimensions
- Wheelbase: Boxster: 2,416 mm (95.1 in); Cayman: 2,416 mm (95.1 in)
- Length: 2005–2008: Boxster: 4,358.6 mm (171.6 in); 2009–2012: 4,368.8 mm (172.0 in); Cayman: 4,372 mm (172.1 in); 2009–2012: Cayman: 4,376 mm (172 in)
- Width: Boxster: 2005–2012: 1,800.9 mm (70.9 in); 2009–2012: 1,816.1 mm (71.5 in); Cayman: 1,801 mm (70.9 in)
- Height: Boxster: 1,295.4 mm (51.0 in); Cayman: 1,305 mm (51.4 in); 2009–2012: 1,303 mm (51.3 in)
- Curb weight: Boxster: 1,295 kg (2,855 lb); Cayman: 1,340 kg (2,954 lb)

Chronology
- Predecessor: Porsche 986
- Successor: Porsche 981

The Porsche 987 is the internal designation for the second generation Porsche Boxster sports car. It made its debut at the 2004 Paris Motor Show alongside the 911 (997) and went on sale in 2005.

In 2005, it was joined in the range by the new Cayman fastback coupé (project 987c) with which it shared the same mid-engine platform and many components, including the front fenders and trunk lid, doors, headlights, taillights, and forward portion of the interior.

It was replaced by the Porsche 981 in 2012.

== Boxster 987.1 ==
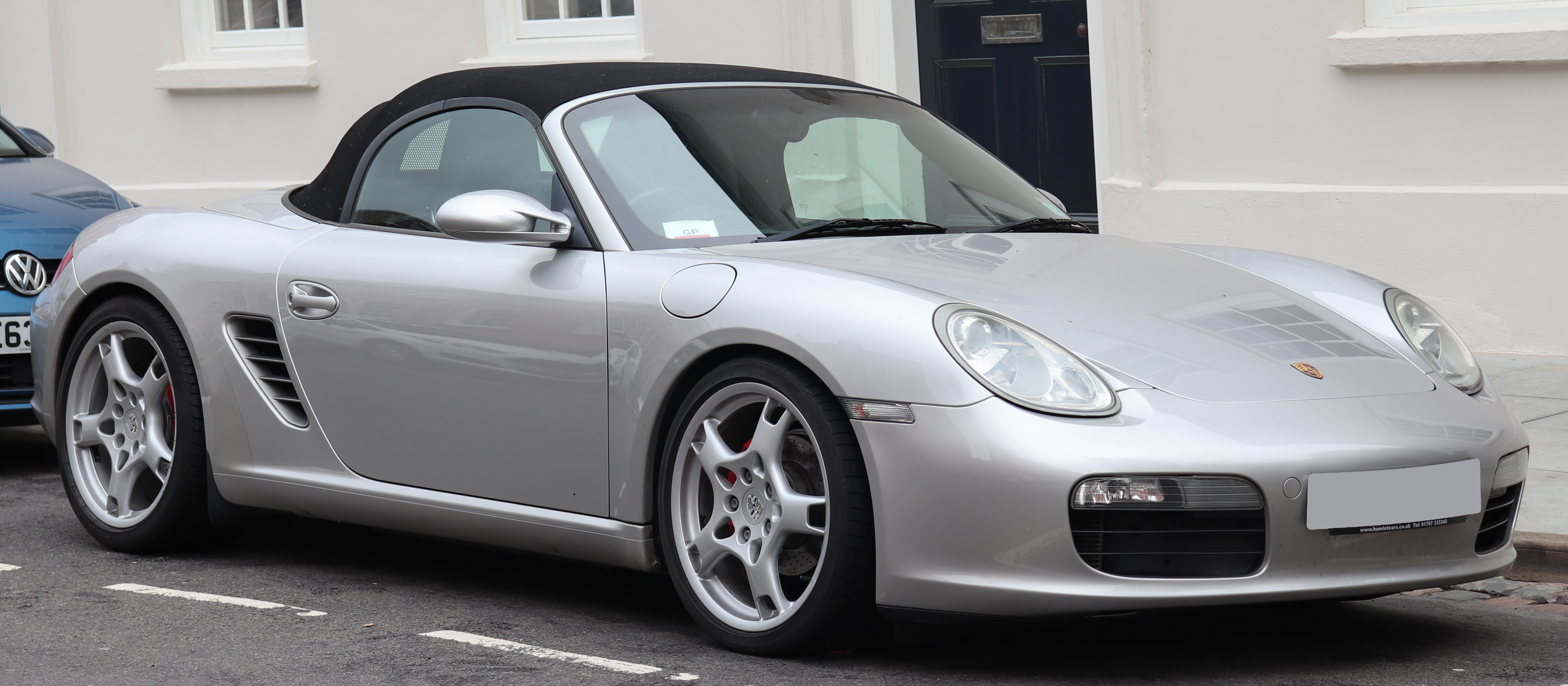
Boxster (987.1)

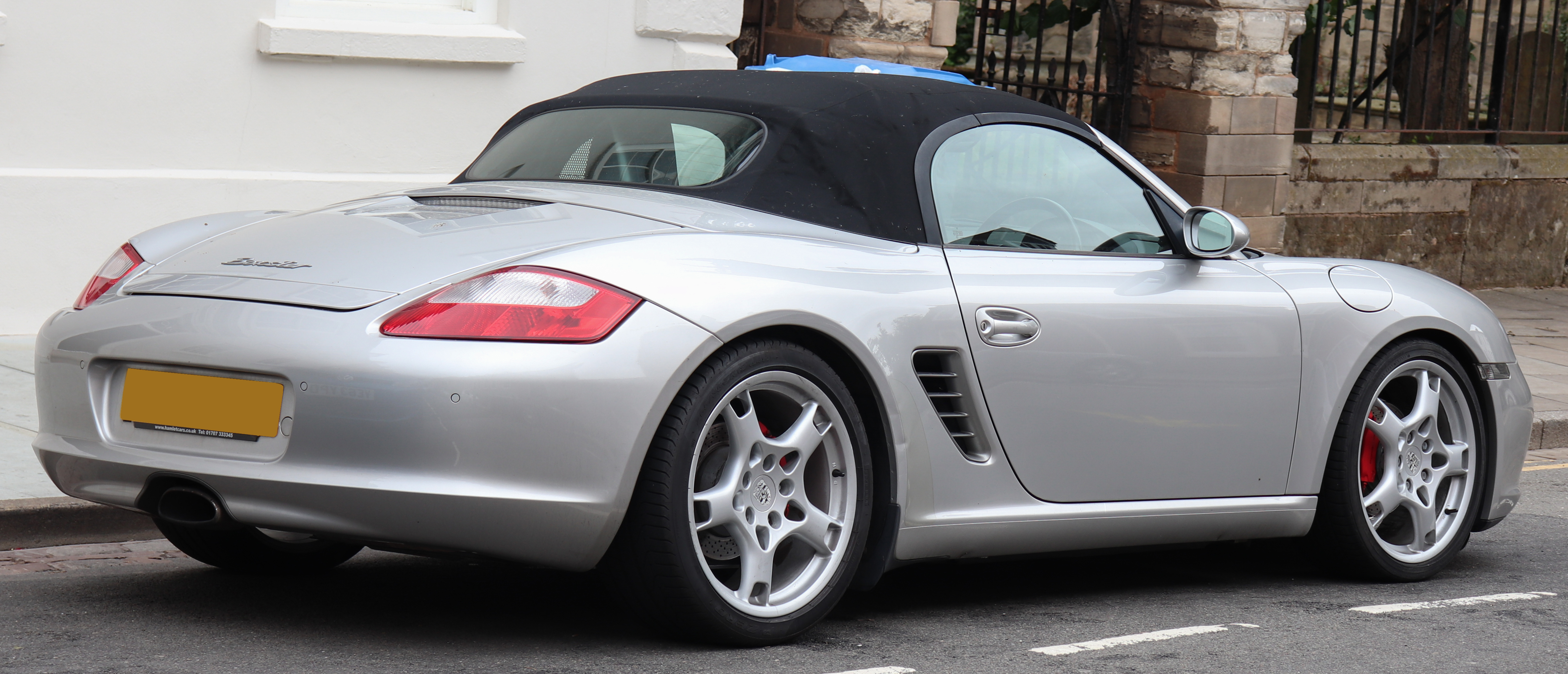
Boxster (987.1) - Rear view

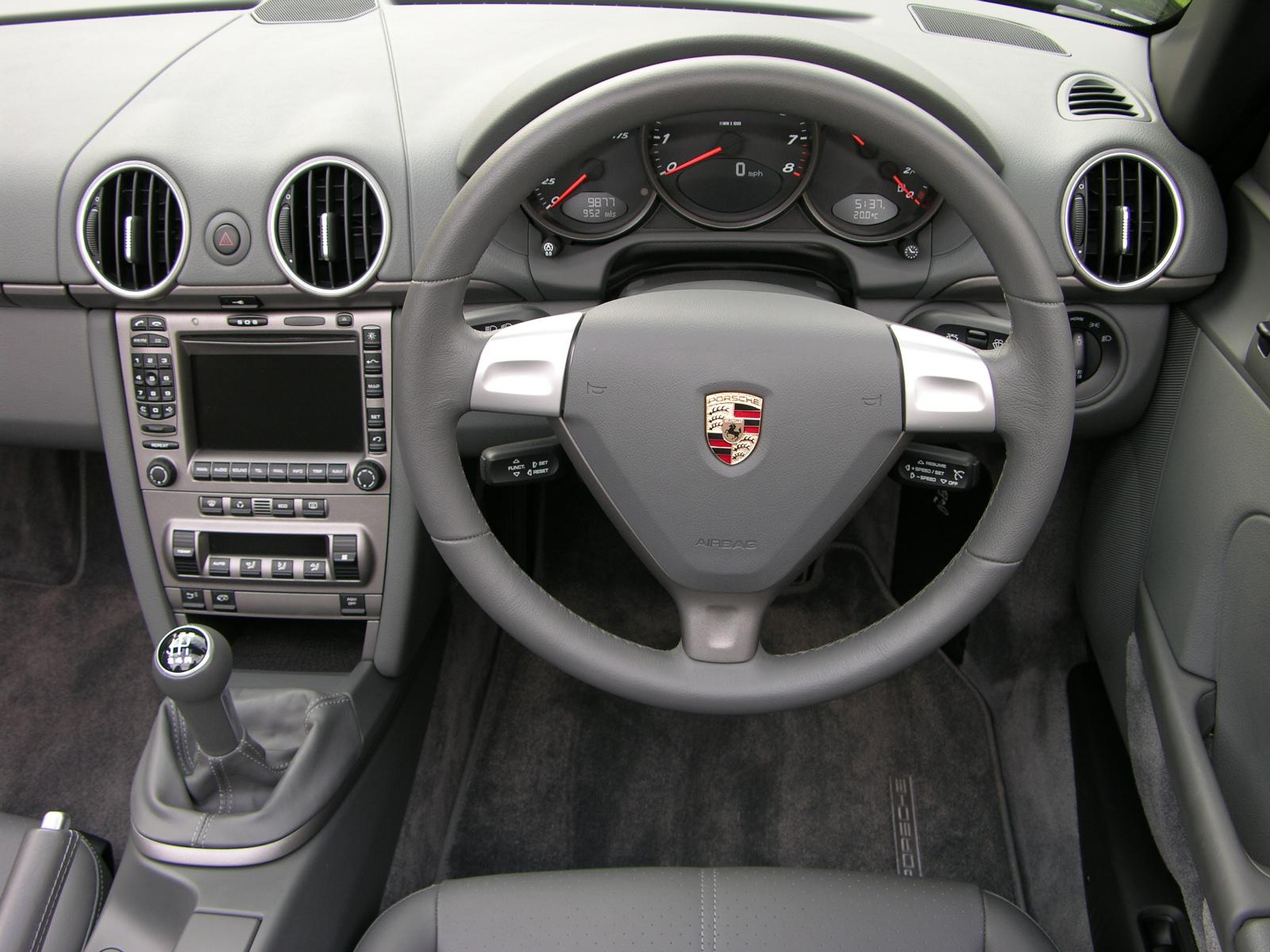
Interior

The 987 was the second generation Boxster model, but remained very similar to the previous generation. The most obvious styling change is to the headlights, which now have a profile similar to those of the Carrera GT, Porsche's flagship mid-engine sports car of the time. The intake vents on the sides of the Boxster were now larger, with more pronounced horizontal slats and are coloured metallic silver, irrespective of the paint colour on the rest of the car. The wheel arches were enlarged to allow wheels up to 19 inches in diameter, a first for the Boxster series.

The most significant updates from the 986 series are in the interior, with a more prominent circular theme evident in the instrument cluster and cooling vents. Porsche claims that the 987 Boxster shares only 20% of its components with its predecessor. The base engine is a 2.7-litre 176 kW (236 hp) flat-6, with the Boxster S getting a 3.2-litre 206 kW (276 hp) engine. The Cayman 2-door fastback coupé is derived from the 987.

For the 2007 model year, the base Boxster received a revised engine featuring VarioCam Plus to provide a 3.7 kW (5.0 hp) power increase (183 kW (245 hp) the same as the Cayman). The Boxster S' engine was upgraded from 3.2-litre to 3.4-litre, resulting in a power increase of 11 kW (15 hp) more (220 kW (295 hp) the same as the Cayman S). These upgrades made the Boxster series and the Cayman series equivalent in terms of power.

=== Boxster 987.1 Specifications ===
| Year | Engine and Power | Transmission | 0–100 km/h (0–62 mph) | Top speed |
|---|---|---|---|---|
| 2005 | 2.7 L, 240 PS (237 hp; 177 kW) | Manual (5) | 6.2 seconds | 256 km/h (159 mph) |
| 2005 | 2.7 L, 240 PS (237 hp; 177 kW) | Tiptronic S | 7.1 seconds | 250 km/h (155 mph) |
| 2005 | 3.2 L S, 280 PS (276 hp; 206 kW) | Manual (6) | 5.5 seconds | 268 km/h (167 mph) |
| 2005 | 3.2 L S, 280 PS (276 hp; 206 kW) | Tiptronic S | 6.3 seconds | 260 km/h (162 mph) |
| 2007 | 2.7 L, 245 PS (242 hp; 180 kW) | Manual (5) | 6.1 seconds | 258 km/h (160 mph) |
| 2007 | 2.7 L, 245 PS (242 hp; 180 kW) | Tiptronic S | 7.0 seconds | 251 km/h (156 mph) |
| 2007 | 3.4 L S, 295 PS (291 hp; 217 kW) | Manual (6) | 5.4 seconds | 272 km/h (169 mph) |
| 2007 | 3.4 L S, 295 PS (291 hp; 217 kW) | Tiptronic S | 6.1 seconds | 264 km/h (164 mph) |

== Boxster 987.2 ==
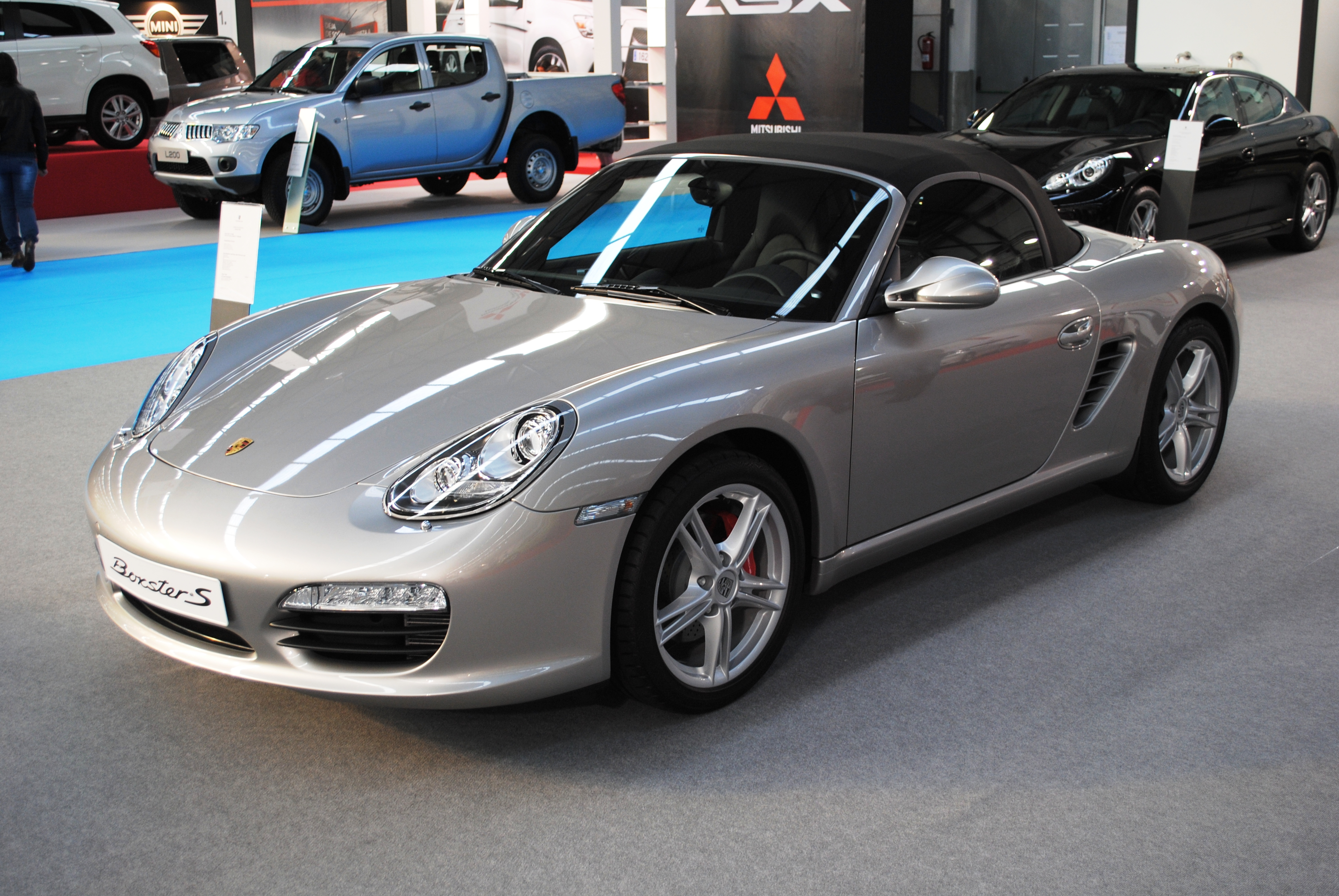
Boxster S (987.2)

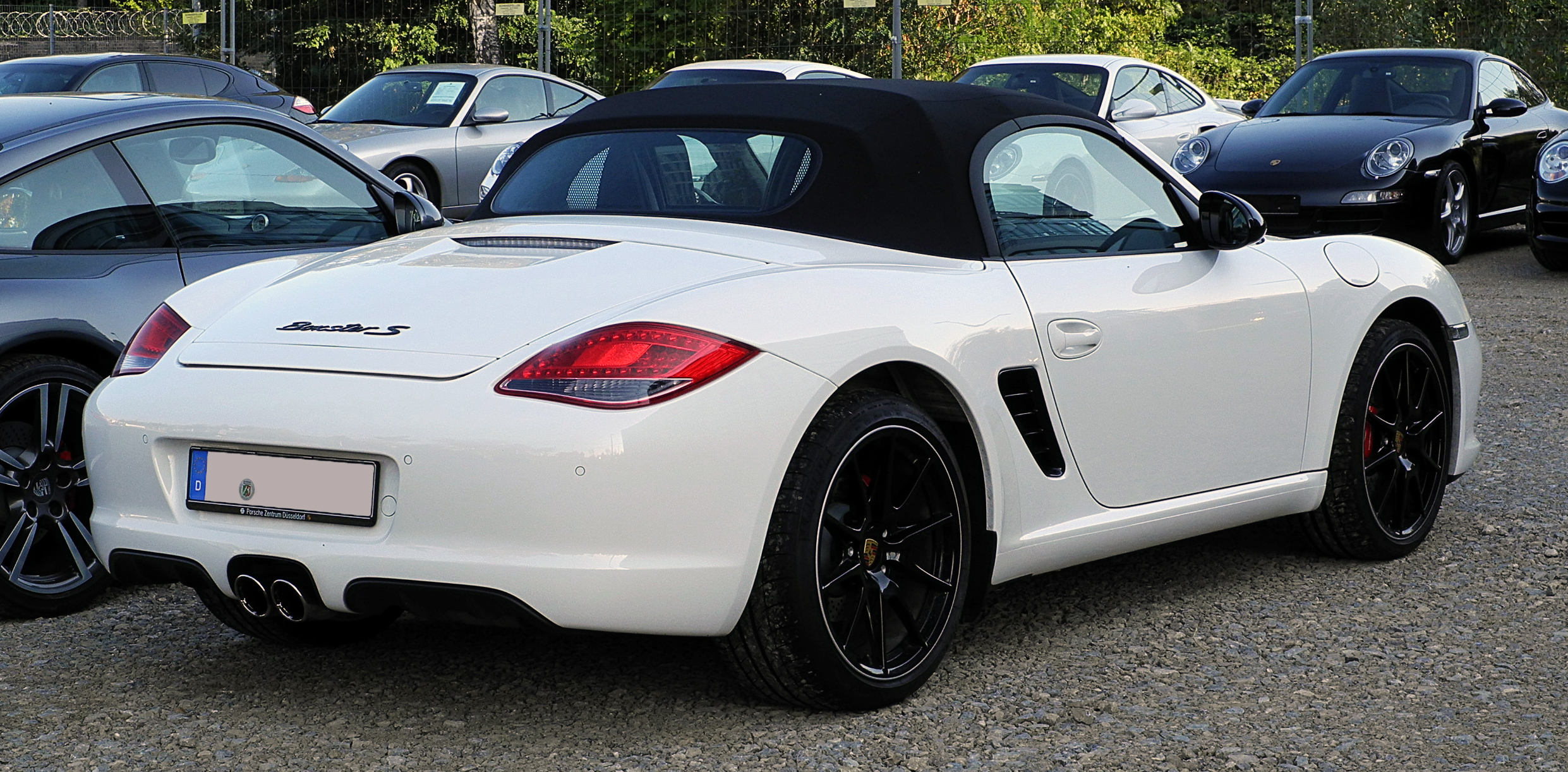
Boxster S (987.2) - Rear view

Porsche first revealed the new revised 987.2 2008 Boxster and Boxster S models at the Los Angeles International Auto Show in November 2008, using totally new engines (MA1.20/MA1.21). Both models featured greater power due to an increase in engine displacement for the Boxster and the incorporation of Direct Fuel Injection (DFI) for the Boxster S. Both models were available with Porsche's new 7-speed Porsche Doppelkupplungsgetriebe (PDK) dual clutch gearbox but came standard with a new 6-speed manual gearbox. Displacement in the standard Boxster's flat-six engine increased from 2.7 to 2.9 liters, increasing power from 245 hp (183 kW) to 255 hp (190 kW). Use of DFI in the Boxster S raised the output of the 3.4-litre engine from 295 hp (220 kW) to 310 hp (231 kW). Cosmetic changes to the 2009 Boxster and Boxster S included new head and tail lights, larger front air intakes with incorporated daytime running lights, and an altered lower rear end flanked by twin diffusers. The interior included the redesigned Porsche Communication Management System as an option with a touchscreen interface to reduce button clutter.

Boxster 3.4L in-car acceleration

=== Boxster 987.2 Specifications ===
| Year | Engine and Power | Transmission | 0–100 km/h (62 mph) | 0–60 mph (97 km/h) | Top speed |
|---|---|---|---|---|---|
| 2009 | 2.9L, 255 PS (252 hp; 188 kW) | Manual (6) | 5.9 seconds | | 263 km/h (163 mph) |
| 2009 | 2.9L, 255 PS (252 hp; 188 kW) | PDK (Sport Plus) | 5.8 seconds | 5.6 seconds | 261 km/h (162 mph) |
| 2009 | 3.4L S, 310 PS (306 hp; 228 kW) | Manual (6) | 5.3 seconds | | 274 km/h (170 mph) |
| 2009 | 3.4L S, 310 PS (306 hp; 228 kW) | PDK (Sport Plus) | 5.2 seconds | 5.0 seconds | 272 km/h (169 mph) |

=== Special models ===
==== RS60 Spyder ====
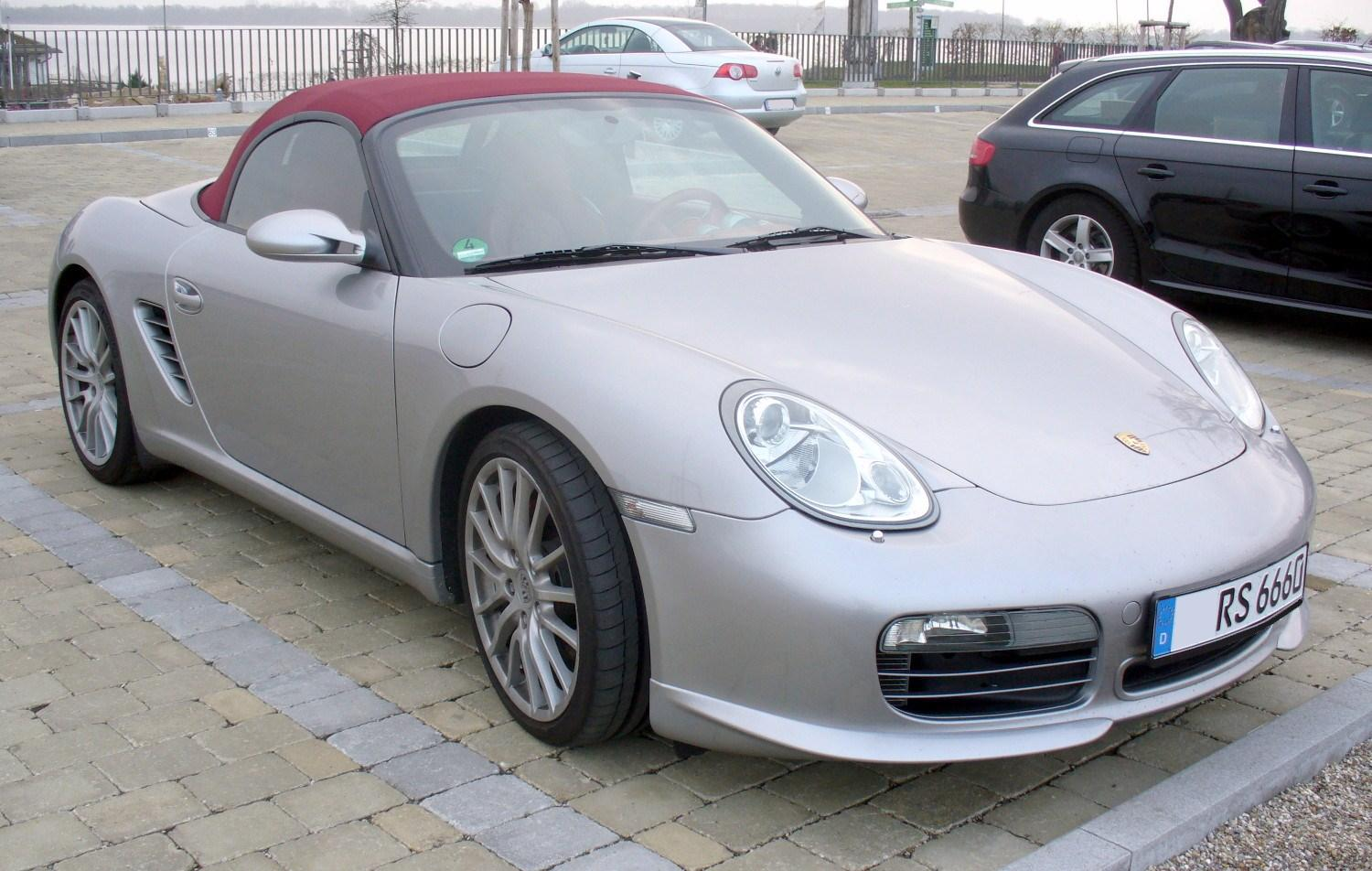
Boxster RS60 Spyder

In November 2007, Porsche announced a commemorative RS60 Spyder edition of the Boxster to celebrate Porsche's 1960 win in the 12 Hours of Sebring in Florida. A total of 1,960 units were produced worldwide, with approximately 800 slated for the U.S. with each model bearing a numbered production badge on the dash. The RS60 Spyder came only in GT Silver Metallic exterior colour while the standard interior is Carrera Red leather, with dark gray leather as an option. The RS60 came standard with 19 inch SportDesign alloy wheels, Porsche's Active Suspension Management System, and a sports exhaust that increased the engine output to 303 PS (299 hp; 223 kW).

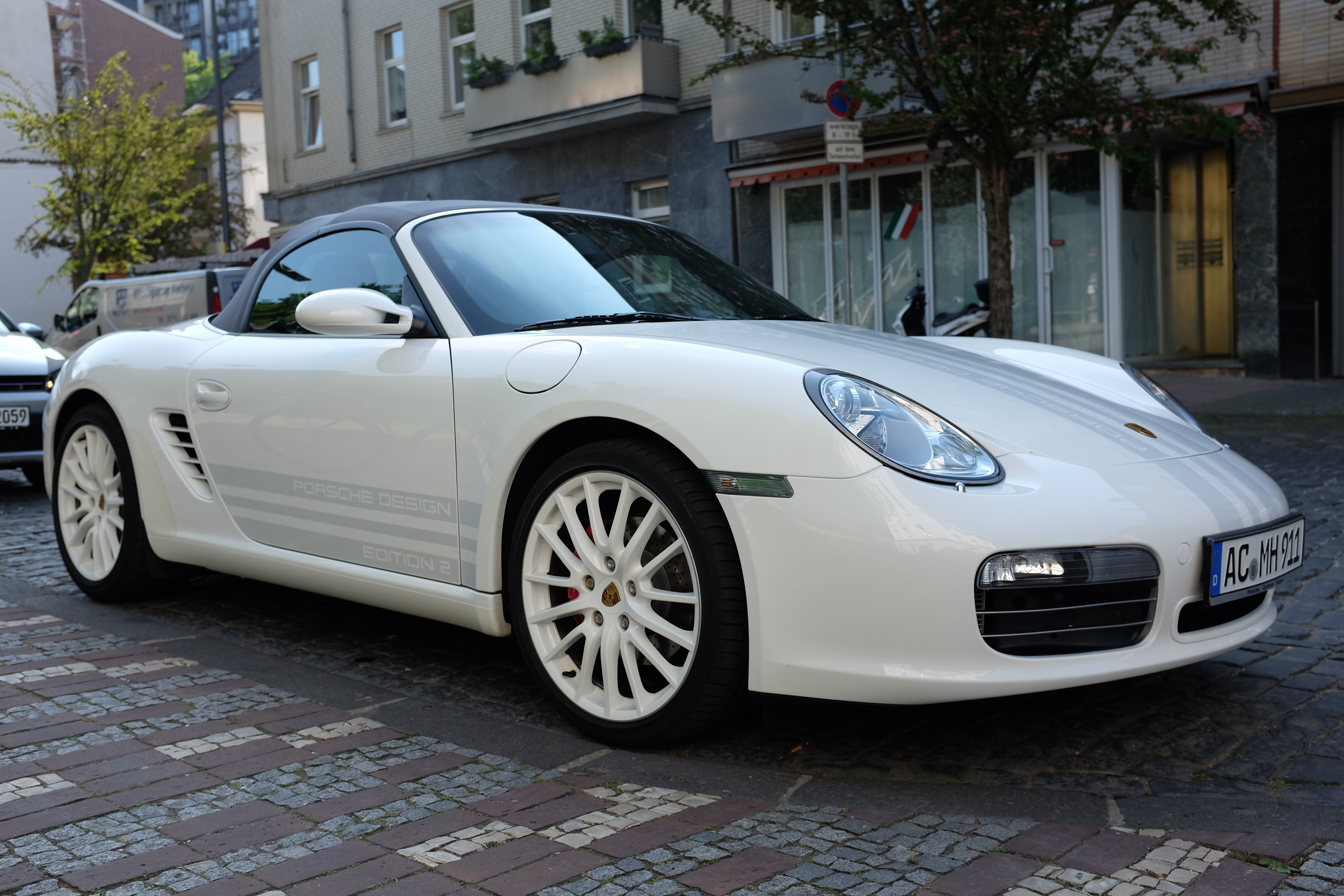
Boxster Design Edition 2

The limited production Boxster S Porsche Design Edition 2 debuted in October 2008 as 2009 model. It featured a free-flowing exhaust system, which raised power from 217 kW (291 hp) at 6,250 rpm to 223 kW (299 hp) at an identical 6,250 rpm. It came in a unified Carrera White paint scheme with matching white 19-inch wheels, a black and grey interior with white gauges, red taillights and light grey stripes along the entire body. 500 were made for the worldwide market, 32 shipped into the U.S. and 18 into Canada.

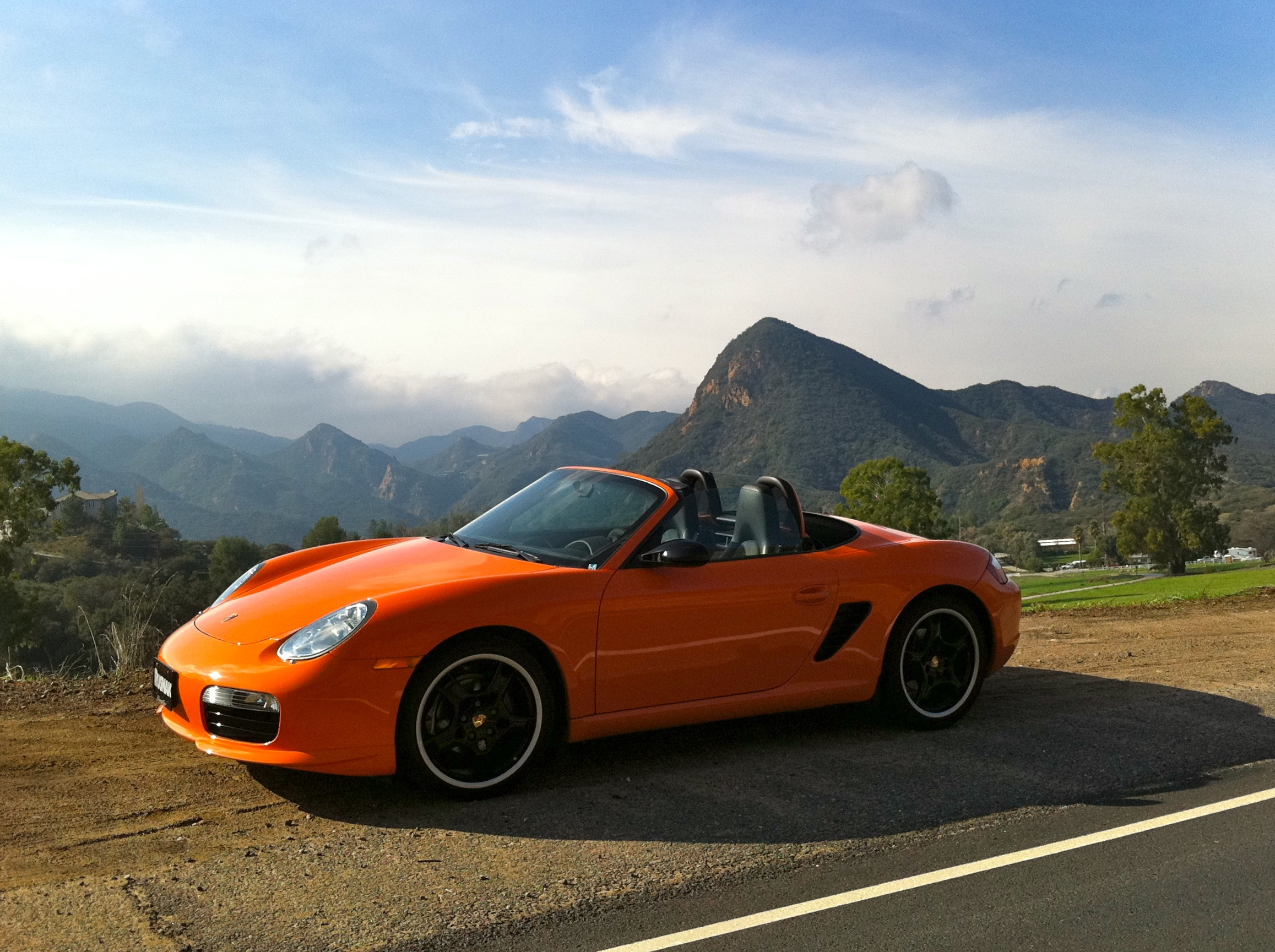
Boxster S Limited Edition

Porsche unveiled its 2008 Limited Edition Boxster and Boxster S models at a private gathering at the occasion of the 2007 New York Auto Show. Largely inspired by the 2007 911 GT3 RS, 250 examples of each model were produced in brilliant orange. Other special exterior features included glossy black painted mirrors, alloy wheels, front and side air inlets, and model designation. The SportDesign package was included as standard which includes aggressive front splitters, a revised rear two-stage spoiler that extends automatically at speed, and an integrated rear diffuser. A sports exhaust system with a dual chromed exhaust tip completed the exterior modifications. On the interior, a numbered 'Limited Edition' plaque is found on the glove box door, while the seat inserts, 911 GT3-spec steering wheel, and handbrake lever all receive Alcantara trim, a suede-like material. Orange roll-over hoops, door lever surrounds, shift knob, cup-holder cover trim and even the font on the gear shift pattern carrying bright orange that match the exterior colour and offset the otherwise black interior.

==== Boxster Spyder ====
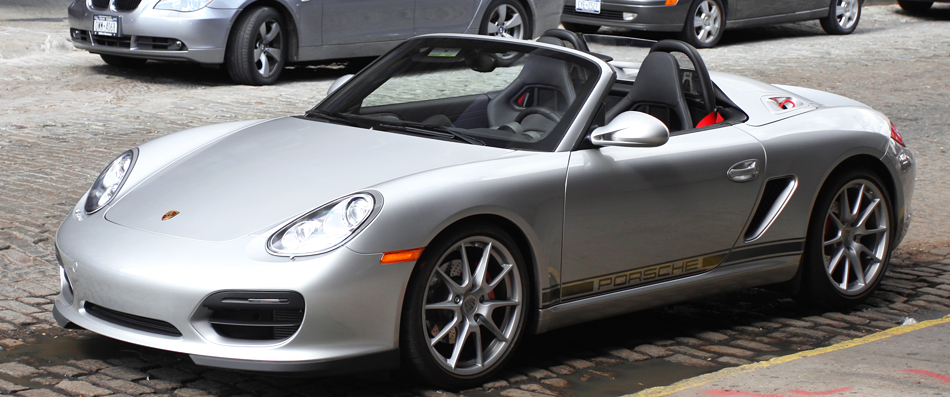
Boxster Spyder

On 5 November 2009, Porsche officially announced a new variant of the Boxster, which was officially unveiled at the 2009 Los Angeles Motor Show. Positioned above the Boxster S, the Boxster Spyder was the lightest Porsche on the market at the time, weighing 1,275 kg (2,811 lb), 80 kg (176 lb) lighter than a Boxster S. This was achieved through the elimination of the conventional soft top's operating mechanism, the radio/PCM unit, door handles, air conditioning, storage compartments, cup holders and large LED light modules on the front fascia, although some of these could be re-added to the car in the form of options. Weight saving was also gained using aluminum doors, an aluminum rear deck and the lightest 19-inch wheels in the Porsche pallet. The Spyder has a firmer suspension setup than the other Boxster models, and is almost one inch lower in order to have improved handling. A manually operated canvas top, carbon fibre sports bucket seats and two signature humps running along the back of the vehicle provide characteristic design elements. It is powered by a six-cylinder boxer engine rated at 320 PS (316 hp; 235 kW) and 273 lb⋅ft (370 N⋅m) of torque, a 7.5 kW (10 hp) increase in power over the Boxster S and the related Cayman S. The Boxster Spyder came with a 6-speed manual transmission as standard and had Porsche's 7-speed PDK dual-clutch gearbox available as an option. The vehicle was released worldwide in February 2010 as a 2011 model.

==== Boxster E ====
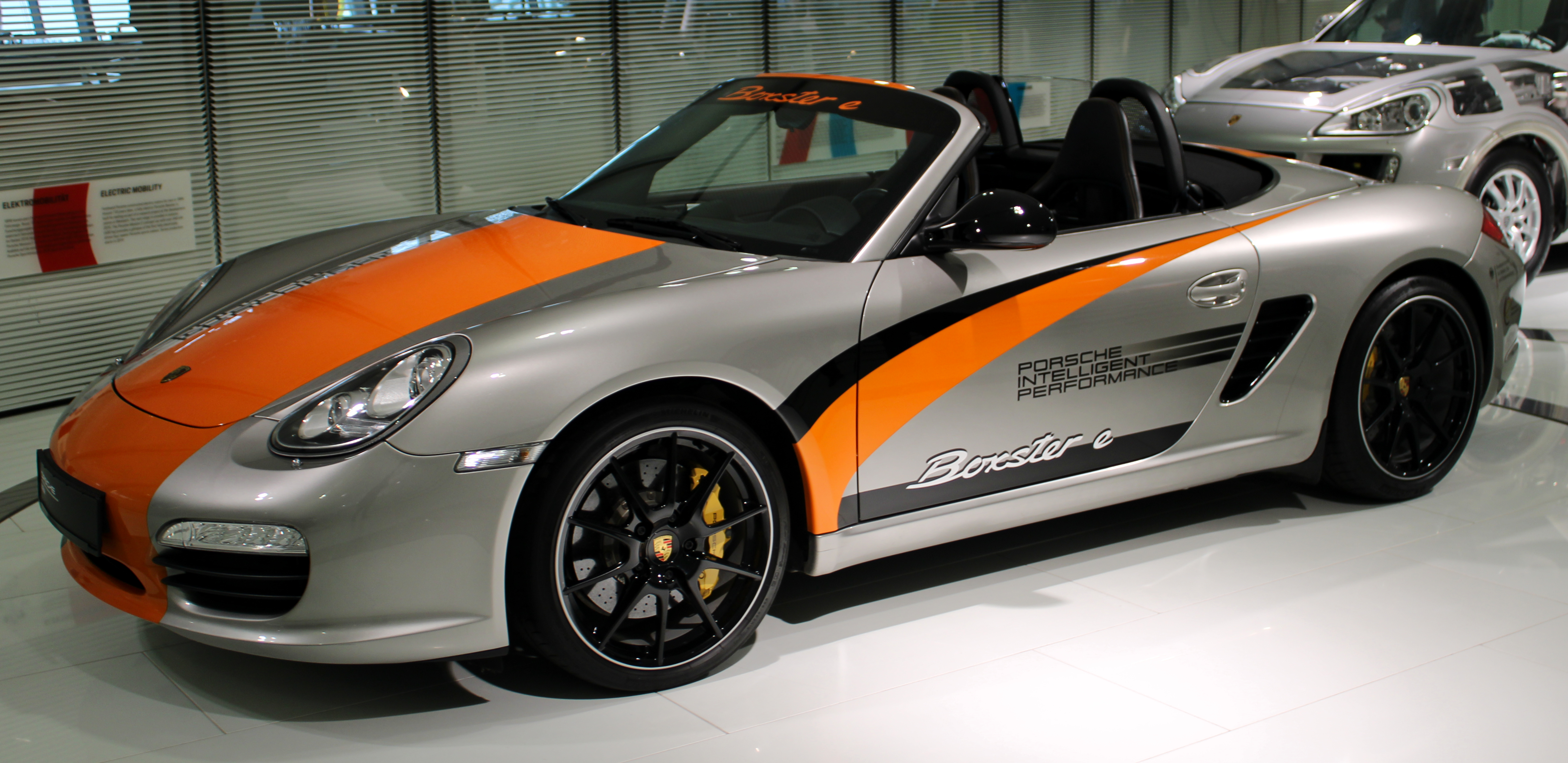
Boxster E prototype in the Porsche Museum (2018)

The 987 chassis was used to develop three battery-electric prototypes in 2011, each known as the Boxster E, as part of the "Model Region Electro-Mobility Stuttgart" practical trial. One prototype was equipped with electric traction motors for both the front and rear axles, while the other two were equipped with motors on the rear axle only. Each motor was the same, producing 90 kW (120 hp) and 270 N⋅m (200 lbf⋅ft), with a single-speed transmission and maximum speed of 12,000 RPM. The two-motor variant had a combined output of 180 kW (240 hp) and 540 N⋅m (400 lbf⋅ft). The Boxster E prototypes were unveiled at the Michelin Challenge Bibendum in May 2011.

The two-motor Boxster E had a claimed performance of 0–100 km/h (62 mph) of 5.5 seconds and a top speed of 200 km/h (120 mph); the rear-motor Es had a respective sprint time of 9.8 seconds and top speed of 150 km/h (93 mph). On the NEDC, the rated range was 170 km (110 mi), using a LiFePO_{4} battery with 29 kW-hr gross capacity (26 kW-hr usable). The entire vehicle weighed 1,600 kg (3,500 lb), of which 341 kg (752 lb) was the traction battery.

== Cayman 987.1 ==
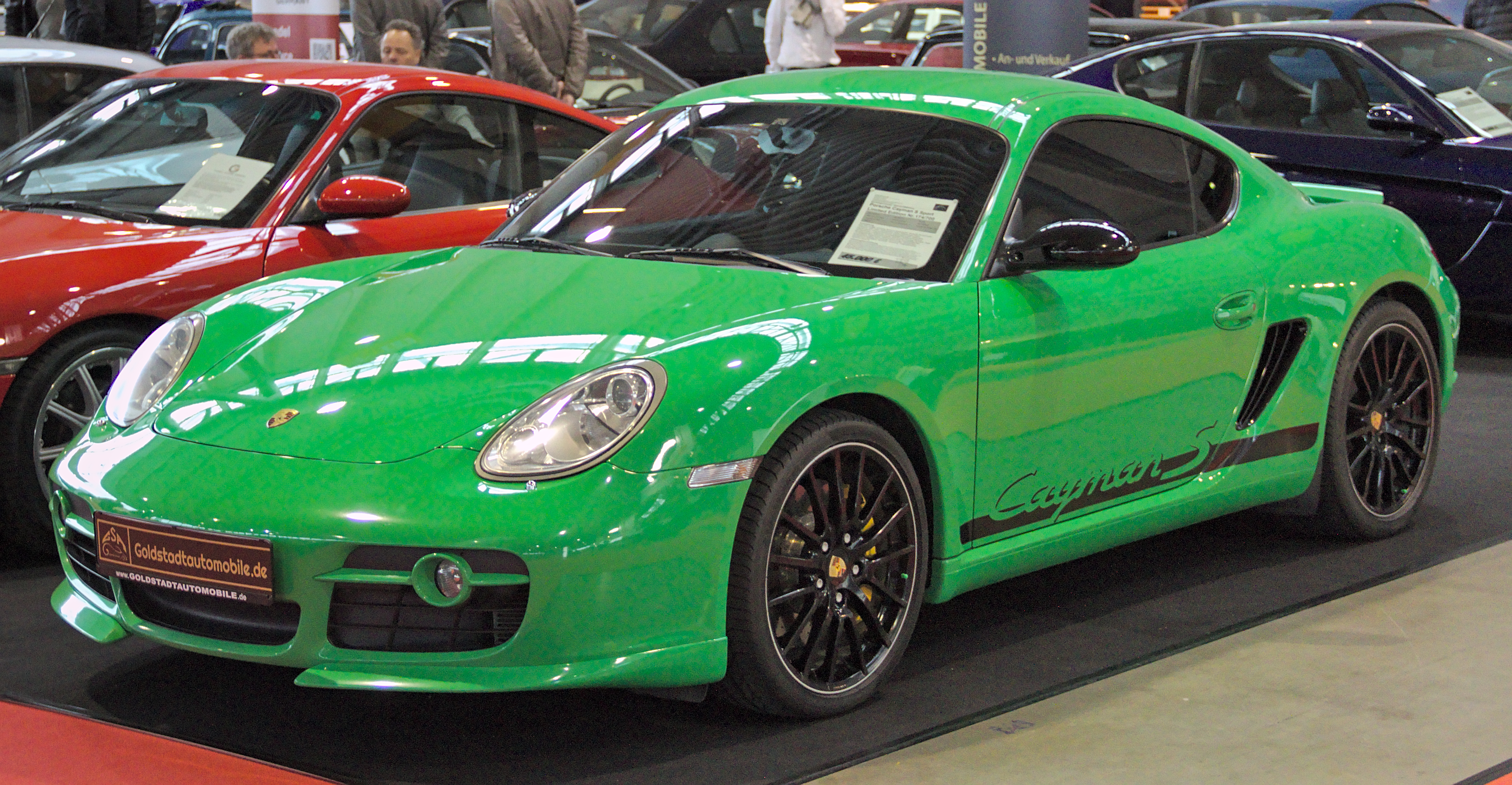
Cayman S (987.1)

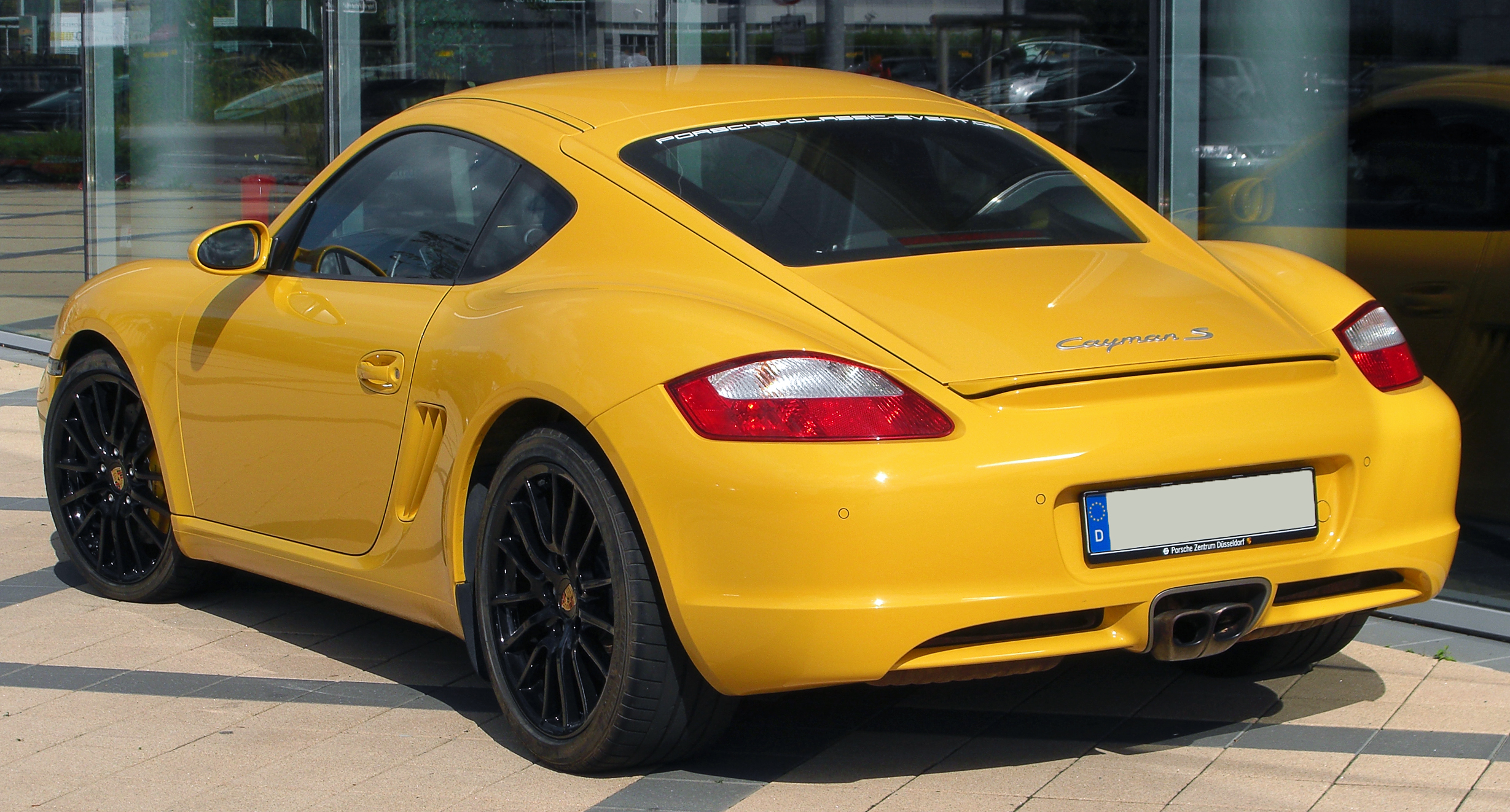
Cayman S (987.1) - Rear view

After two years of development, the first model of the fastback coupé to be released was the Cayman S (type 987120). Photographs and technical details were released in May 2005, but the public unveiling took place at the September Frankfurt Motor Show. The S suffix (for Sport or Special) indicated that this was a higher performance version of a then unreleased base model. That model, the Cayman (987110), went on sale in July 2006.

The Cayman fastback coupé (project 987c) and the second generation Boxster roadster (project 987) shared the same mid-engine platform and many components, including the front fenders and trunk lid, doors, headlights, taillights, and forward portion of the interior. The design of the Cayman's body incorporates styling cues from classic Porsches; 356/1, the 550 Coupé and the 904 Coupé. The 987.1 Cayman used the M97.20 and M97.21 engines.

Unlike the Boxster, the Cayman has a hatchback for access to luggage areas on top of and in the back of the engine cover. The entire rear section rear-wards of the side doors of the Cayman is made from stainless steel. The suspension design is fundamentally the same as that of the Boxster with revised settings due to the stiffer chassis with the car's fixed roof.

The 3.4-litre flat-6 boxer engine (M97.21) in the first generation Cayman S was derived from the 3.2-litre (M96.26) that was used in the Boxster S, with cylinder heads from the 997 S's 3.8-litre engine (M97.01), which have the VarioCam Plus inlet valve timing and lift system. A less powerful but more fuel efficient version, the 2.7-litre M97.20, powered the base model. The use of these engines exclusively in Caymans ended in the 2007 model year when Porsche upgraded the Boxster (987310) and Boxster S (987320).

A 5-speed manual transaxle is standard on the Cayman (G87.01), while a 6-speed manual (Getrag 466) was the standard transmission for the S model (G87.21) and an option on the base model (A87.20). An electronically controlled 5-speed automatic transaxle (Tiptronic) was also available on the S (A87.21) and the non-S version (A87.02) (The 2009 models replaced this option with a seven-speed "PDK", Porsche's dual clutch transmission. Other options include active shock absorbers (ThyssenKrupp Bilstein GmbH's DampTronic, rebadged as PASM by Porsche), ceramic disc brakes (PCCB), xenon headlights (Hella's Bi-Xenon) and an electronically controlled sport mode (Sport Chrono Package).

The first generation Cayman ceased production in November 2011.

=== Cayman 987.1 Specifications ===
| Year | Engine | Power | Torque | Transmission | 0–100 km/h (62 mph) | 0–60 mph (97 km/h) | Top speed | CO2 |
|---|---|---|---|---|---|---|---|---|
| 2006 | 3.4 L (3,386 cc) | 295 PS (291 hp; 217 kW) | 340 N⋅m (251 lb⋅ft) | Manual (6) | 5.4 seconds | 5.1 seconds | 275 km/h (171 mph) | 254 g/km |
| 2007 | 2.7 L (2,687 cc) | 245 PS (242 hp; 180 kW) | 273 N⋅m (201 lb⋅ft) | Manual (5) | 6.1 seconds | 5.8 seconds | 260 km/h (162 mph) | 222 g/km |

Performance

Porsche Cayman S
Cayman S 3.4-litre under acceleration

The Cayman S' performance came close to the performance of Porsche's flagship models at the time. Rally driver Walter Röhrl lapped the Nürburgring Nordschleife track in a Cayman S equipped with optional 19" wheels, PCCB, and PASM in a time of 8 minutes, 11 seconds. The time for a standard Cayman S, as published by the manufacturer, was 8 minutes, 20 seconds. In contrast, Röhrl recorded 8 minutes, 15 seconds in a 911 Carrera.

A Cayman prepared and run by private team of Jürgen and Uwe Alzen finished fourth overall (of 220 entrants) in the 2007 Nürburgring 24 Hour race, ahead of two flagship Porsche 997 GT3 RSR's, a 997 GT3 Cup, and a 996 GT3 Cup. Another two privateer Caymans, entered by CSR and MSpeed, finished 22nd and 117th overall, respectively. Porsche disclaims support for the Cayman teams, while supporting some or all of the 997 teams.

Starting with the 2009 model, a limited-slip differential was available as an option. The base Cayman received an engine upgrade to 2.9 L (198 kW (266 hp)), and the Cayman S a 3.4 L (229 kW (307 hp)). The factory tuned 2008 Cayman S Sport with its special exhaust system produces 236 kW (316 hp) from its 3.4 L engine.

Performance data
| Source | 0–60 mph (97 km/h) | 0–100 km/h (62 mph) | 0–160 km/h (100 mph) | 0–200 km/h (125 mph) | 1/4 mile (~400 m) | 1 km | Top speed |
|---|---|---|---|---|---|---|---|
Cayman
| Manufacturer | 5.8 s | 6.1 s | 14.2 s | — | — | — | 260 km/h (162 mph) |
Cayman S
| Manufacturer | 5.1 s | 5.4 s | 11.7 s | 18.6 s | — | 24.3 s | 280 km/h (174 mph) |
| Auto Motor Sport | — | 5.5 s | 12 s | 19.2 s | — | — | — |
| Automobile | 5.1 s | — | — | — | 13.7 at 105 mph (169 km/h) | — | — |
| Car and Driver | 4.8 s | — | 11.4 s | — | 13.3 at 107 mph (172 km/h) | — | 267 km/h (166 mph) |
| Road & Track | 4.8 s | — | — | — | 13.3 at 106 mph (171 km/h) | — | — |
Cayman R
| Manufacturer | 4.4 s | 4.7 s | 10.2 s | 16.7 s | 12.5 at 112 mph | 23 s | 282 km/h (175 mph) |

== Cayman 987.2 ==
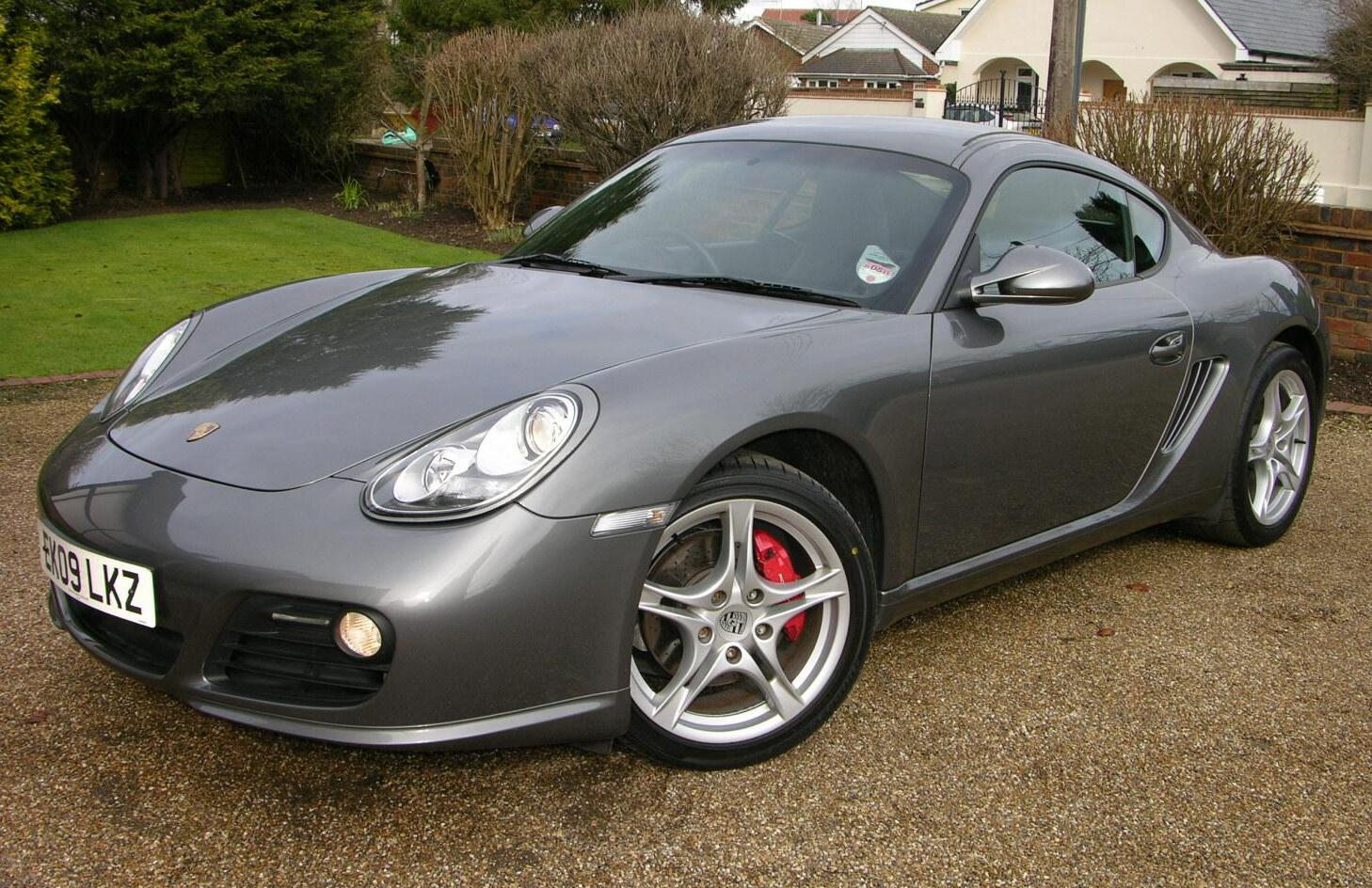
Cayman S (987.2)

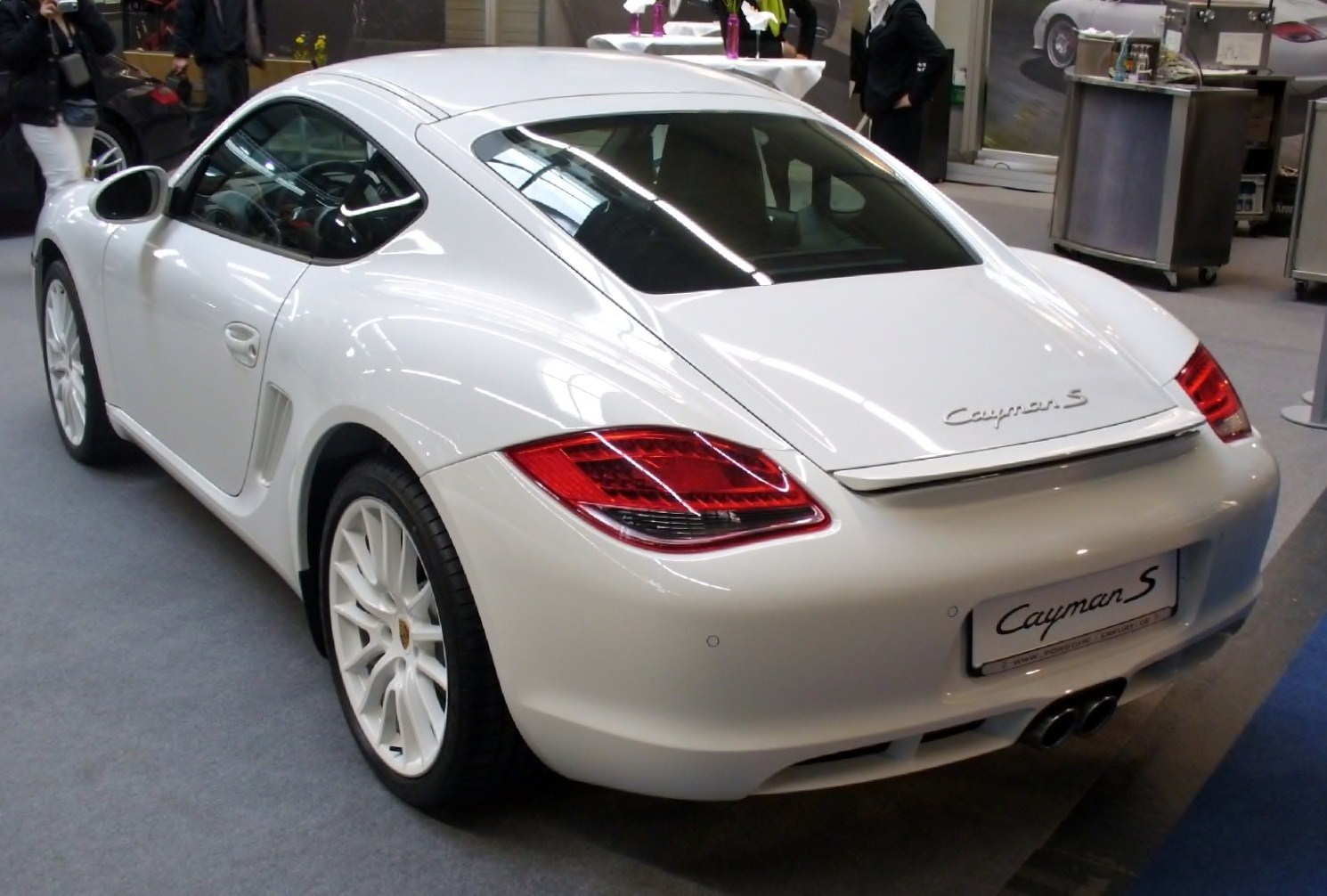
Cayman S (987.2) - Rear view

A revised version of the Porsche Cayman 987 was introduced on 21 February 2009, with a totally new engine (MA1.20/MA1.21). The standard Cayman engine's displacement was increased from 2.7 L to 2.9 L, giving a 15 kW (20 hp) increase to 198 kW (266 hp), while the Cayman S gained direct injection and a 19 kW (25 hp) increase to 239 kW (321 hp). The new engines no longer had the Intermediate Shaft, which proved to be a weak link in pre-2009 engines. Both the Cayman and Cayman S maintained a 7 kW (9 hp) power advantage over their roadster sibling, the Boxster. The design for the front bumper was also kept distinct for the two models. The front signal lamps are designed differently: while both use LED signal lamps, the Cayman's are arranged like the face of dice while the Boxster has a horizontal row of 4 LEDs. The Porsche Tiptronic S automatic gearbox was replaced by the 7-speed PDK dual-clutch transmission for the new model. Also a limited-slip differential is now a factory option. The Cayman R was introduced in 2011 as the pinnacle of the 987.2 generation with a reduced weight, increased power, improved aerodynamics and handling.

=== Cayman 987.2 Specifications ===
| Year | Model | Engine | Transmission | Power | Torque | 0–100 km/h (62 mph) | 0–60 mph (97 km/h) | Top speed | CO2 |
|---|---|---|---|---|---|---|---|---|---|
| 2009 | Cayman | 2.9 L (2,893 cc) | Manual (6) | 195 kW (265 PS; 261 bhp) | 300 N⋅m (221 lb⋅ft) | 5.8 seconds | 5.5 seconds | 265 km/h (165 mph) | 221 g/km |
| 2009 | Cayman | 2.9 L (2,893 cc) | PDK | 195 kW (265 PS; 261 bhp) | 300 N⋅m (221 lb⋅ft) | 5.7 seconds | 5.4 seconds | 263 km/h (163 mph) | 221 g/km |
| 2009 | Cayman S | 3.4 L (3,436 cc) | Manual (6) | 235 kW (320 PS; 315 bhp) | 370 N⋅m (273 lb⋅ft) | 5.2 seconds | 4.9 seconds | 277 km/h (172 mph) | 223 g/km |
| 2009 | Cayman S | 3.4 L (3,436 cc) | PDK | 235 kW (320 PS; 315 bhp) | 370 N⋅m (273 lb⋅ft) | 5.1 seconds | 4.8 seconds | 275 km/h (171 mph) | 223 g/km |
| 2011 | Cayman R | 3.4 L (3,436 cc) | Manual (6) | 243 kW (330 PS; 326 bhp) | 370 N⋅m (273 lb⋅ft) | 5.0 seconds | 4.7 seconds | 282 km/h (175 mph) | 228 g/km |
| 2011 | Cayman R | 3.4 L (3,436 cc) | PDK | 243 kW (330 PS; 326 bhp) | 370 N⋅m (273 lb⋅ft) | 4.9 seconds 4.7 seconds with 'Sports Chrono Pack' | 4.4 seconds | 280 km/h (173 mph) | 218 g/km |

=== Special Models ===
==== Design Edition 1 ====
The Porsche Design Edition 1 is a Cayman S model designed by Porsche Design, commemorating the 35th anniversary of Porsche Design. The all black car has a black leather interior on the seats, dashboard, and door trim, as well as black Alcantara steering wheel, gear lever, handbrake grip, and headliner. The Porsche Design Edition 1 also is fitted standard with the Porsche Active Suspension Management (PASM), 19-inch 911 (997) Turbo wheels with 235/35 ZR 19 front and 265/35 ZR 19 rear tyres, Porsche Design script on the instrument dials, stainless steel entry plate engraved with "Porsche Design Edition 1", all-red rear taillights, custom vinyl exterior black-on-black graphics, and a numbered plaque on the glovebox cover. As with all PASM-equipped cars, the body is lowered by 10 mm (0.4 in). Standard equipment includes a briefcase containing the Flat Six Chronograph, a pocket knife, a pair of sunglasses, a pen, and a key ring – all in black, even the knife blade. A total of 777 vehicles were produced as 2008 models. It went on sale in November 2007 in Germany, followed by the U.S. in January 2008.

==== Cayman S Sport ====
Porsche also announced the production of a limited edition Cayman S Sport, which was available in October 2008 as a 2009 model. This version of the Cayman S includes PSE (Porsche Sports Exhaust), PASM (Porsche Active Suspension Management), and Sport Chrono.

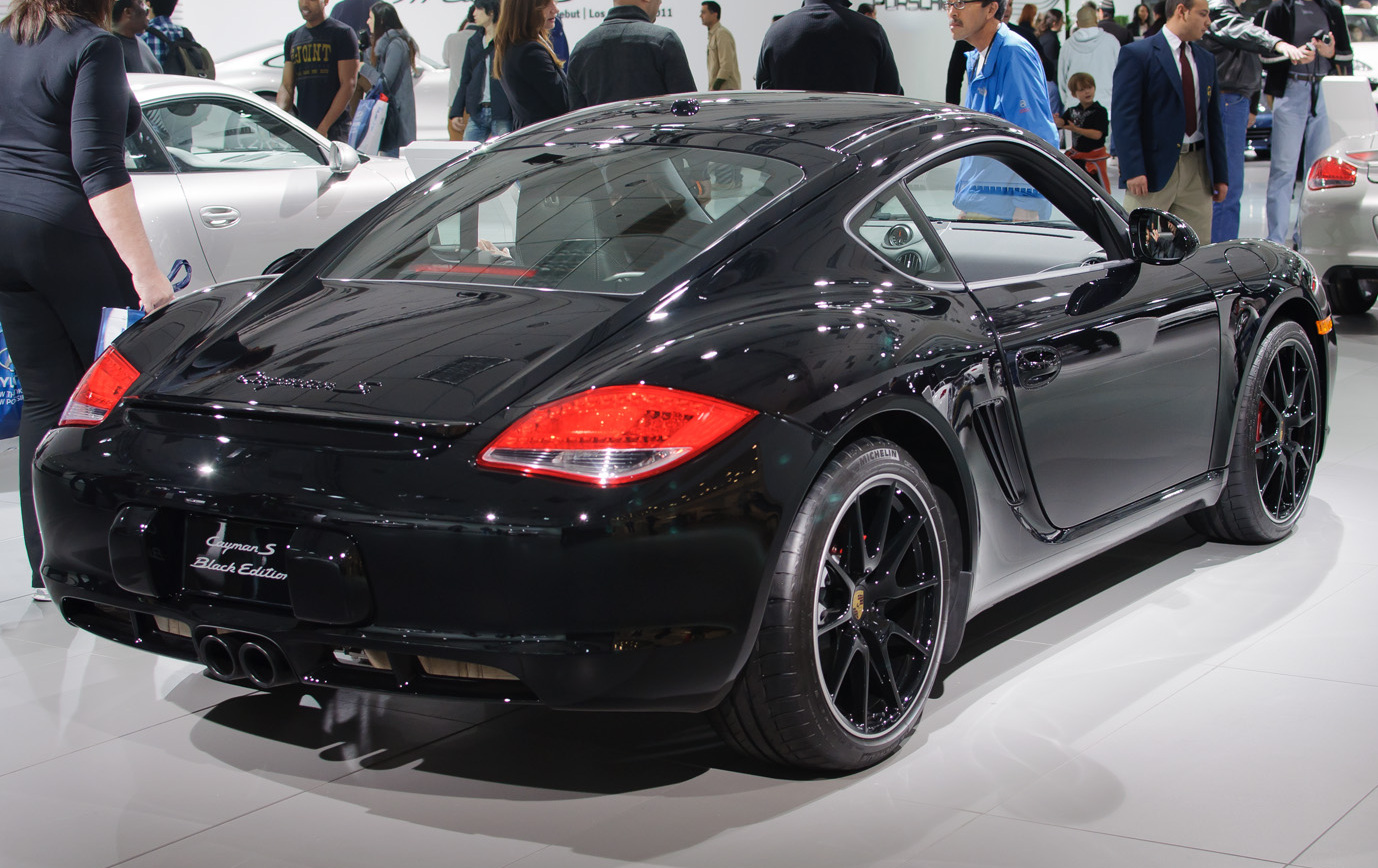
Porsche Cayman S Black Edition

The Cayman S Sport comes in Bright Orange and Signal Green (from the 911 GT3 RS), as well as Carrara White, Speed Yellow, Guards Red, Black, and Arctic Silver (done upon special order at an extra cost). The Cayman S Sport also features short shifter, sports seats, deviated color seatbelts, "Cayman S" striping on the door sides, black Porsche Design 19-inch wheels, various gloss black interior trims, gloss black side mirrors, stainless steel door sills with "Cayman S Sport" script, 5 mm wheel spacers, and Alcantara steering wheel and shift knob from the 997 911 GT3 RS. The instrumentation does not include a hood. The body is lowered by 1 cm due to its PASM feature. A total of 700 were made, with 100 coming to the US.

Porsche also produced the Porsche Cayman S Black Edition with sales starting in July, 2011. The Black Edition is the rarest limited edition Cayman S with a total of 500 built.

==== Cayman R ====
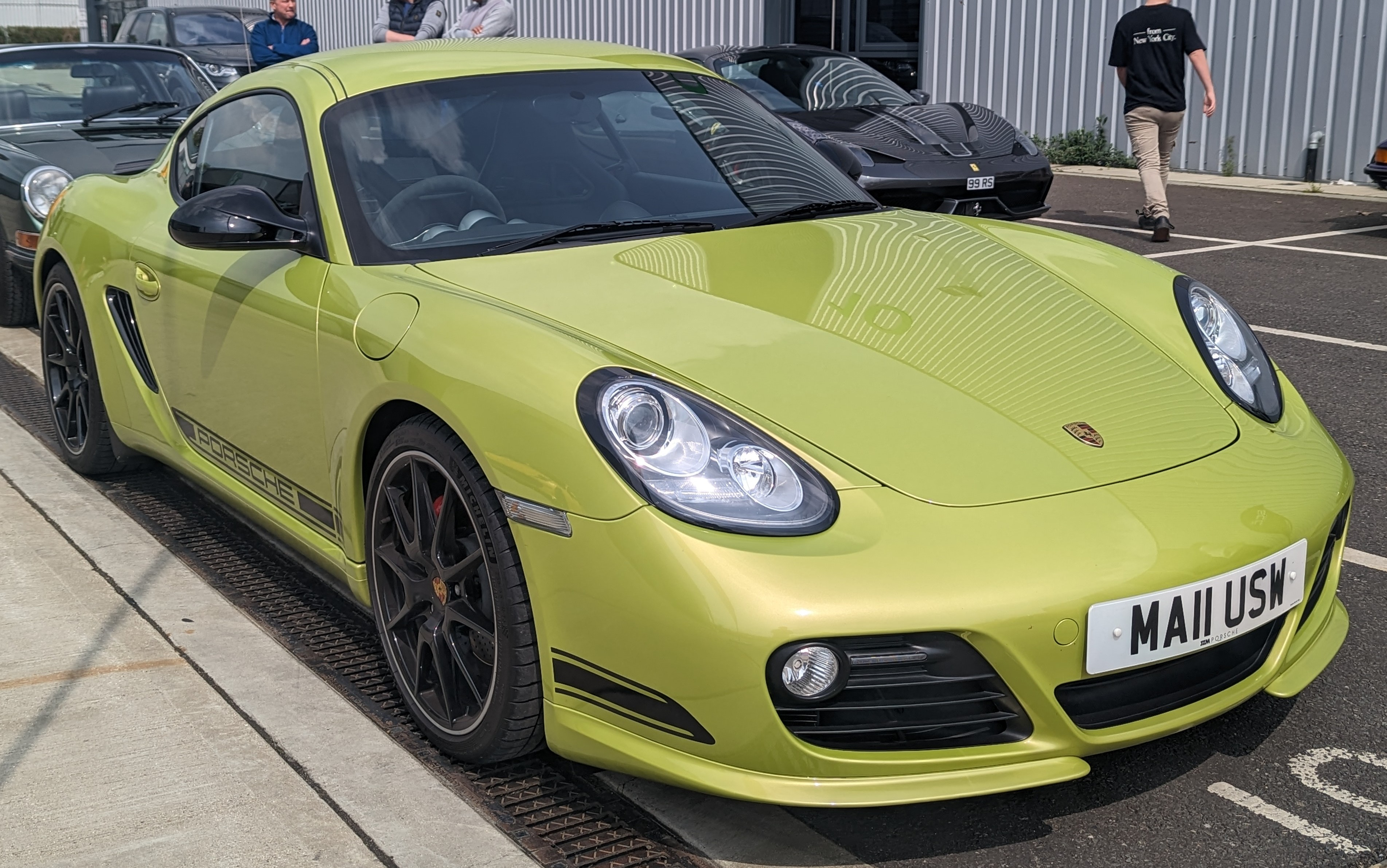
2011 Porsche Cayman R in Peridot Green Metallic, unique to the R as an optional colour.

The Cayman R was introduced in 2011 as the pinnacle of the 987 generation. Based on the 2009 987.2 Cayman S, the Cayman R was lighter and came with additional power and handling upgrades.

Weight savings: a 54.8 kg (121 lb) weight savings over the Cayman S was achieved with the use of 19 inch lightweight wheels shared with the Boxster Spyder, aluminium doors from the 997 911 GT3, carbon fibre bucket seats from the 997 911 GT2, and with the removal of the radio, storage compartments, air-conditioning, door handles and rear wiper. Porsche Ceramic Composite Brake (PCCB) system was an additional option available for the Cayman R.

Styling: The Cayman R also received various cosmetic changes, such as decals on the doors, instrument cover delete, gloss black painted mirrors, black 'R' model designation emblem on the trunk, dashboard and door sills, as well as black painted wheels.

Aerodynamics: There were minor changes to aerodynamics with the Cayman R, mostly coming from the use of the rarely selected Porsche OEM aerokit, introduced as an option in 2007. A carbon rear spoiler was added as well as more aggressive front fascia spoilers.

Suspension: With all new passive sports suspension, the Cayman R was 10 mm (0.4 in) lower than a Cayman S equipped with PASM, or a full 20 mm (0.8 in) lower than a Cayman S equipped with standard passive suspension.

Powertrain: The powertrain is a 3,436 cc (3.4 L; 209.7 cu in) direct injection flat-six engine rated at 330 PS, 243 kW (326 hp) at 7,400 rpm and 370 N⋅m (273 lb⋅ft) of torque at 4,750 rpm. 6 speed manual or 7 speed PDK automatic gearboxes were offered.

Performance: The standard Cayman R can accelerate from 0–100 km/h (62 mph) in 5 seconds, with the optional 7-speed PDK dual clutch transmission, it can accelerate from 0–100 km/h (62 mph) in 4.9 seconds, and with the optional Sport Chrono Package offering launch control it can accelerate from 0–100 km/h (62 mph) in 4.7 seconds. The Cayman R with the manual transmission can reach a top speed of 282 km/h (175 mph), and 280 km/h (174 mph) with the PDK.

Personalisation options:

- Standard Paint - Peridot Green Metallic, Black, Guards Red, Carrara White, Speed Yellow
- Metallic Paint - Basalt Black, Platinum Silver, Dark Blue, Aqua Blue, Meteor Grey, Macadamia
- Special paint - Cream white, GT Silver, Amethyst Metallic, Ruby Red Metallic
- Exterior - Bi-Xenon Headlights with Dynamic Cornering lights, Lightweight Li-ion battery, Model delete, Park Assist, Dimming Mirror with rain sensor.
- Engine, Transmission and chassis - PDK, PCCB, Sport Chrono, Sport Chrono Plus with PCM, Sports Exhaust System
- Wheels - 19-inch Spyder, 19-inch Carrera S II, 19-inch Carrera Classic, 19-inch SportDesign, 19-inch Carrera Sport, 19-inch 911 Turbo II,
- Interior - Cruise control, Climate control, Tracking System (PVTS), Sport seats, Seat heating, Fire extinguisher, Floor mats, Cupholder, Surveillance.
- Audio and communication - Audio system, Navigation (PCM), Sound package plus, CD changer, Audio interface, Phone preparation and module.

Launch and production numbers: The Cayman R debuted at the 2010 Los Angeles Auto Show on 17 November 2010. A total of 1,621 Cayman Rs were made worldwide, with 220 for the UK market, approximately 100 in manual, and 120 in PDK auto.

Branding: Porsche made use of the iconic lightweight "R" designation for the Cayman R which originated with the 911 R in 1967. The 911 R, limited to a production run of 19 vehicles, was specifically designed for racing purposes.

== Deliveries ==
| Calendar Year | U.S.A. (Normal/Special) | North America | Rest of World | Total | Notes |
|---|---|---|---|---|---|
| 2006 | 1160 / 5865 | 7313 | 8984 | 16297 | NA Source |
| 2007 | 2650 / 3377 | 6249 | 8736 | 14985 | NA Source |
| Total | 3810 / 9242 | 13562 | 17720 | 31282 | |

| Calendar Year | Jan | Feb | Mar | Apr | May | Jun | Jul | Aug | Sept | Oct | Nov | Dec | Total |
|---|---|---|---|---|---|---|---|---|---|---|---|---|---|
| 2006 | 1000* | 566 | 647* | 699 | 587 | 442 | 650 | 548 | 494 | 580 | 565 | 535 | 7313 |
| 2007 | 499 | 342 | 635 | 509 | 616 | 577 | 661 | 609 | 469 | 404 | 363 | 565 | 6249 |
| 2008 | 550 | 242 | 285 | 402* | 480 | 451 | 567 | 130 | 78 | 78 | 76 | 328 | 3667 |

* Uncertain due to typos in press release or change in style of reports used.
