= Studiotorino =

Italian car design firm and coachbuilder

- Industry: Automotive
- Founded: 1 January 2005; 21 years ago in Rivoli, Piedmont, Italy
- Founders: Alfredo Paola Stola; Maria Paola Stola; Marco Goffi
- Website: studiotorino.com

Studiotorino is an Italian automotive design house, or carrozzeria, specializing in designing and building handmade sports cars. The company was founded on 1 January 2005 in Rivoli by Alfredo and Maria Paola Stola with Marco Goffi.

The carrozzeria continues the tradition of Alfredo Stola's grandfather, who founded the Stola company, a carrozzeria and model works, noted by Vincenzo Lancia, the founder of Lancia for the high quality of their design modelling work.

== Models ==
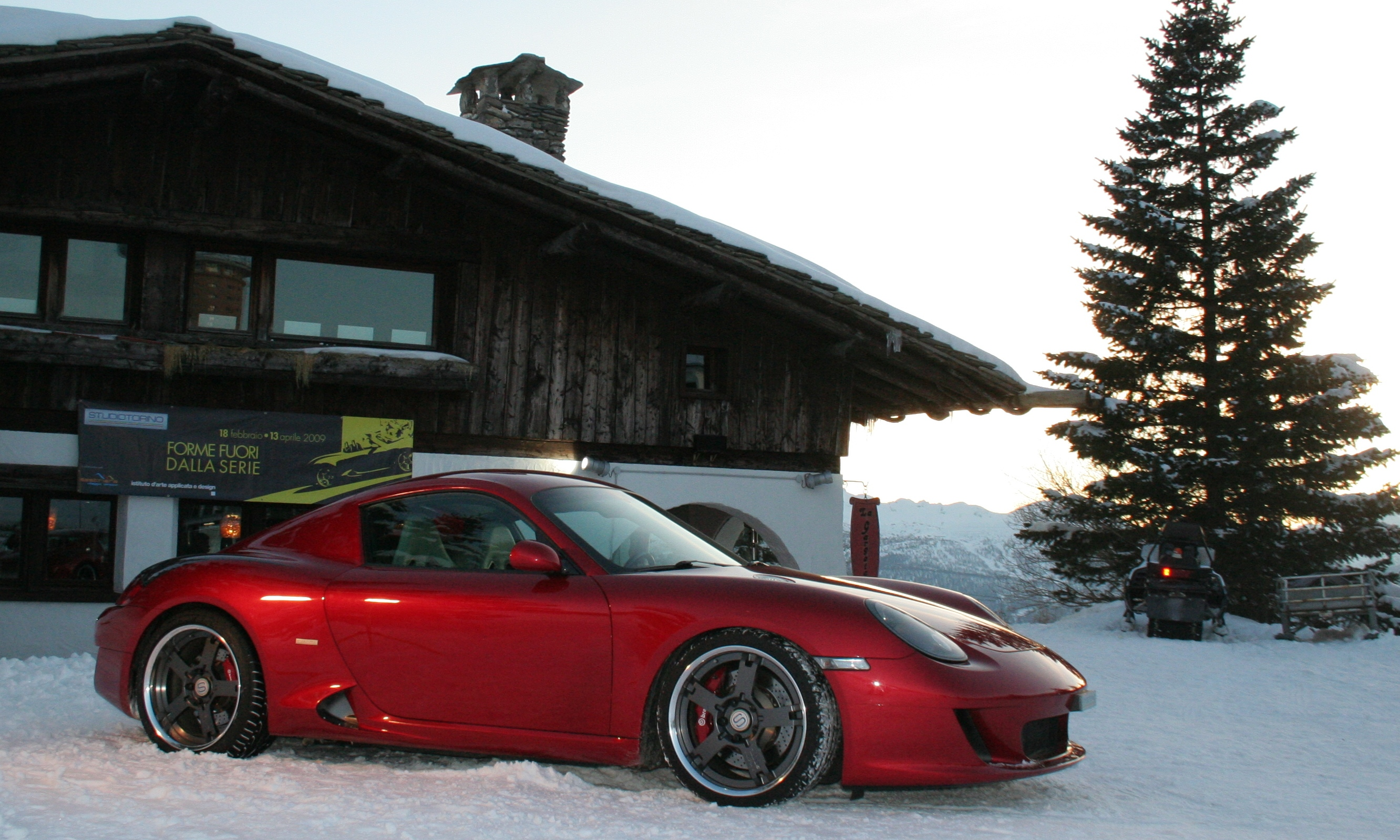
Ruf RK Coupe

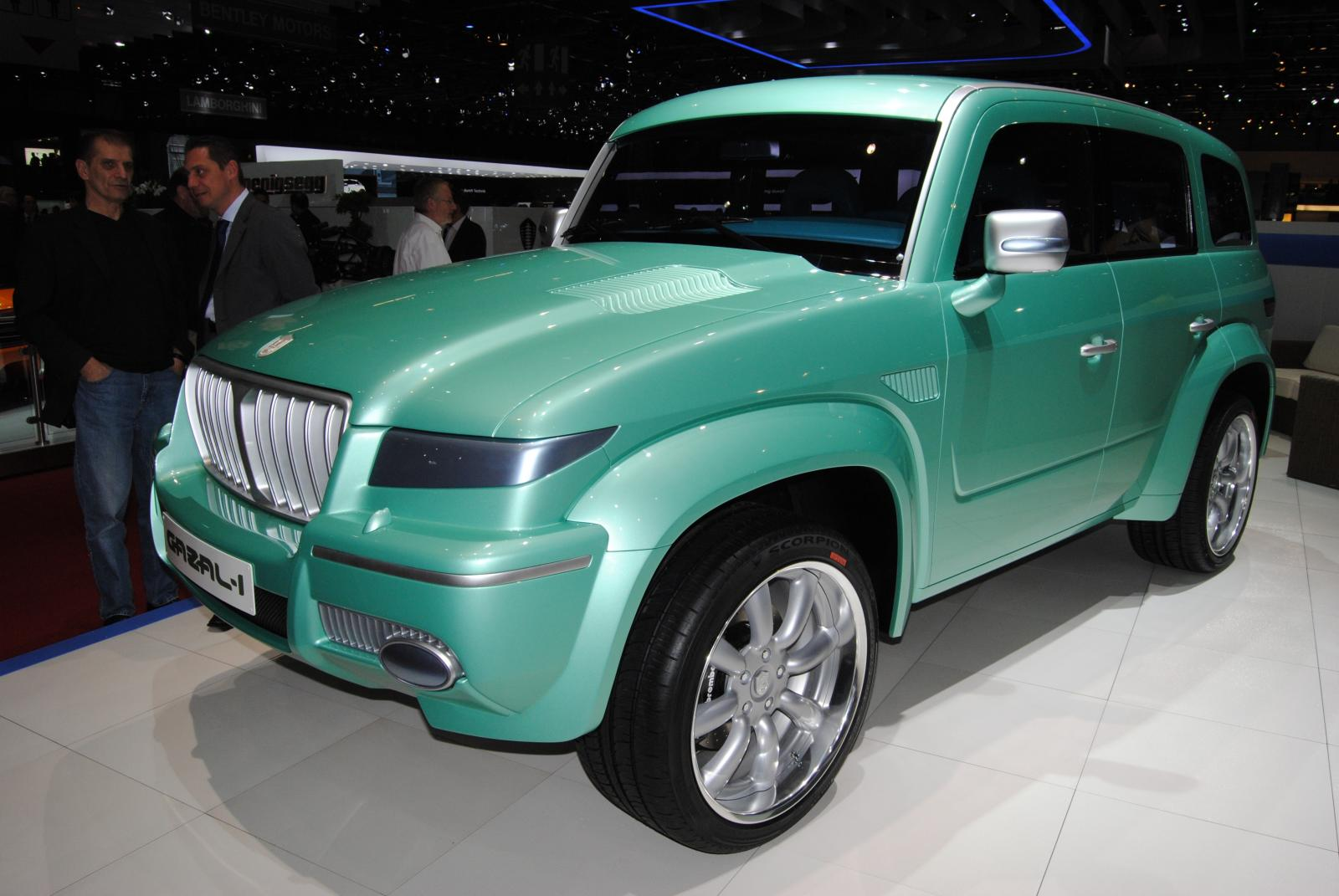
KSU Gazal-1

- RUF Studiotorino RK Spyder, sportscar in limited edition
- RUF Studiotorino RK Coupè, sportscar in limited edition
- RUF Studiotorino R Spyder, sportscar in limited edition
- Cinqueporte scale model 1:4 on Maserati Quattroporte base, presented in Rome on 5 February 2008 at "Scrigno tesori d’Italia"
- 500 Diabolika, Fiat Nuova 500 personalisation, in limited edition presented on 12 September 2008 in Turin
- Coupetorino, scale model 1:4 on Mercedes-Benz SL-Class base, presented on 12 December 2008 at "Torino capitale mondiale del Design 2008"
- KSU Gazal-1, collaboration for "design" with King Saud University and Magna Steyr Italy, whose model was presented at the 2010 Geneva Motor Show.
- CoupèTorino MY 2013, new stile concept developed with a collaboration of 6 student of IAAD of Torino, the model in scale 1/4 was presented on 27 May 2013 at the Design Center of Mercedes-Benz in Como
- Moncenisio, sports car in limited edition, evolution of RK Coupe based on new Porsche Cayman S (type 981)

== Awards ==
RK Spyder - winner of the concours "L’auto più bella del mondo", 3 March 2006 at the Palazzo della Triennale in Milan – category sportscars RK Coupè - winner of the concours "L’auto più bella del mondo", 11 April 2007 at the "Salone dell’automobile" in Shanghai – category sportscars

== See also ==
- List of Italian companies
