= Ruf RK =

Ruf RK Coupe/Spyder
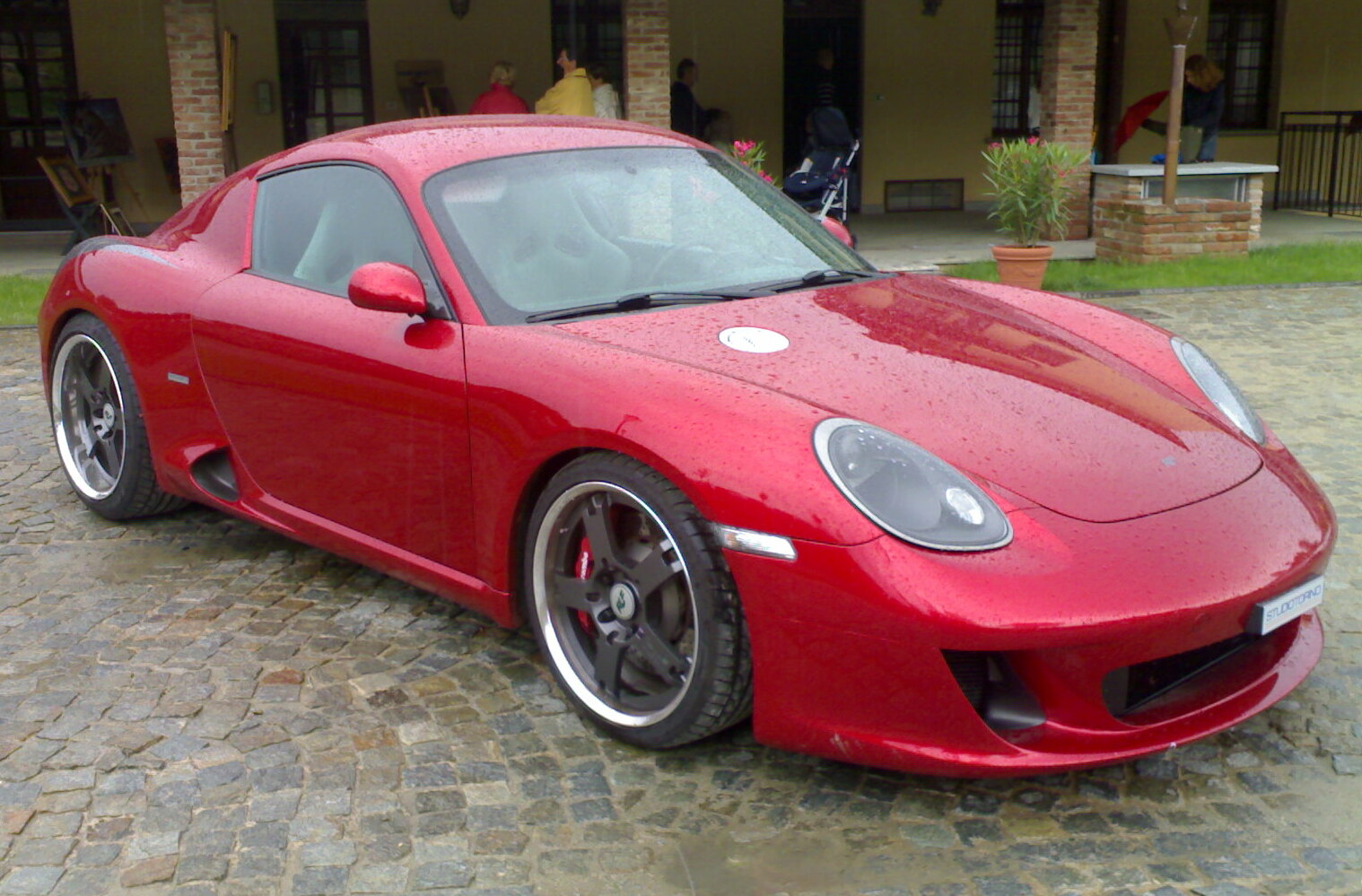
- Ruf RK Coupe

Overview
- Manufacturer: Ruf; Studiotorino
- Production: 2005–2008 (RK Spyder); 2006–2007 (RK Coupe)
- Designer: Aldo Brovarone

Body and chassis
- Class: Sports car (S)
- Body style: 2-door coupé; 2-door convertible
- Layout: Rear mid-engine, rear-wheel-drive
- Related: Porsche Boxster and Cayman (987)

Powertrain
- Engine: 3.8 L (231.9 cu in) supercharged flat-6
- Transmission: 6-speed manual

Dimensions
- Wheelbase: 2,415 mm (95 in)
- Length: 4,329 mm (170 in)
- Width: 1,801 mm (71 in)
- Height: 1,250 mm (49 in)
- Kerb weight: 1,365 kg (3,009 lb) (dry)

The Ruf RK Coupe and RK Spyder are mid-engine sports cars made by Ruf Automobile in collaboration with Italian design house Studiotorino. The RK Spyder was introduced in 2005 in Turin and the RK Coupe was introduced the following year in 2006 in California.

== Development and production ==
The RK is a result of a collaboration between German automaker Ruf and Italian carrozzeria Studiotorino. The RK Coupe and Spyder are based on the Porsche 987 Cayman and Boxster. Studiotorino consulted with Aldo Brovarone on the designs, with the RK taking cues from the Ferrari Dino 246 GT, the Porsche 550, and the Porsche 904.

Both the Coupe and Spyder feature revised bodywork by Studiotorino, including redesigned front and rear fascias, redesigned vents afront the rear wheels, integrated door handles with electronic door latches, forged aluminum exhaust and filler cap, custom wheels. Revisions to the Coupe include a redesigned roofline removing the rear quarter windows and adding a new rear hatch to replace the sloping rear glass with a smaller upright piece and adding "flying" buttresses based on the existing pillars.

Initially, 49 RK Coupes and 49 RK Spyders were to be produced. However, according to Studiotorino, only three RK Spyders, two RK Coupes, and one R Spyder, a naturally-aspirated variant of the RK Spyder, were produced between 2005 and 2007.

== Performance ==
Power comes from a 3.8 litre flat-6 engine from the Porsche 997 911 which has been supercharged in both models (the RK stands for Ruf Kompressor), with the RK Spyder rated at 313 kW (420 hp) and 450 N⋅m (332 lbf⋅ft) of torque and the RK Coupe rated at 324 kW (434 hp) at 7,000 rpm and 470 N⋅m (347 lb⋅ft) of torque at 5,500 rpm. This allows the RK Spyder to accelerate from 0-62 mph (100 km/h) in 4.5 seconds, with a top speed of 285 km/h (177 mph). The RK Coupe, the better performer of the two, has a top speed of 314 km/h (190 mph), and can accelerate from 0-100 km/h (62 mph) in 4.1 seconds and from 0-97 km/h (60 mph) in 3.8 seconds.

Ruf also produced a naturally aspirated version of the RK Spyder, called the R Spyder, whose engine is rated at 350 hp (261 kW) at 6,600 rpm and 400 N⋅m (295 lb⋅ft) of torque at 4,600 rpm, propelling the car from 0-100 km/h (62 mph) in 4.7 seconds and on to a top speed of 280 km/h (174 mph).
