= KSU Gazal-1 =

First sport utility vehicle of Saudi Arabia

KSU Gazal-1 جامعة الملك سعود غزال ١
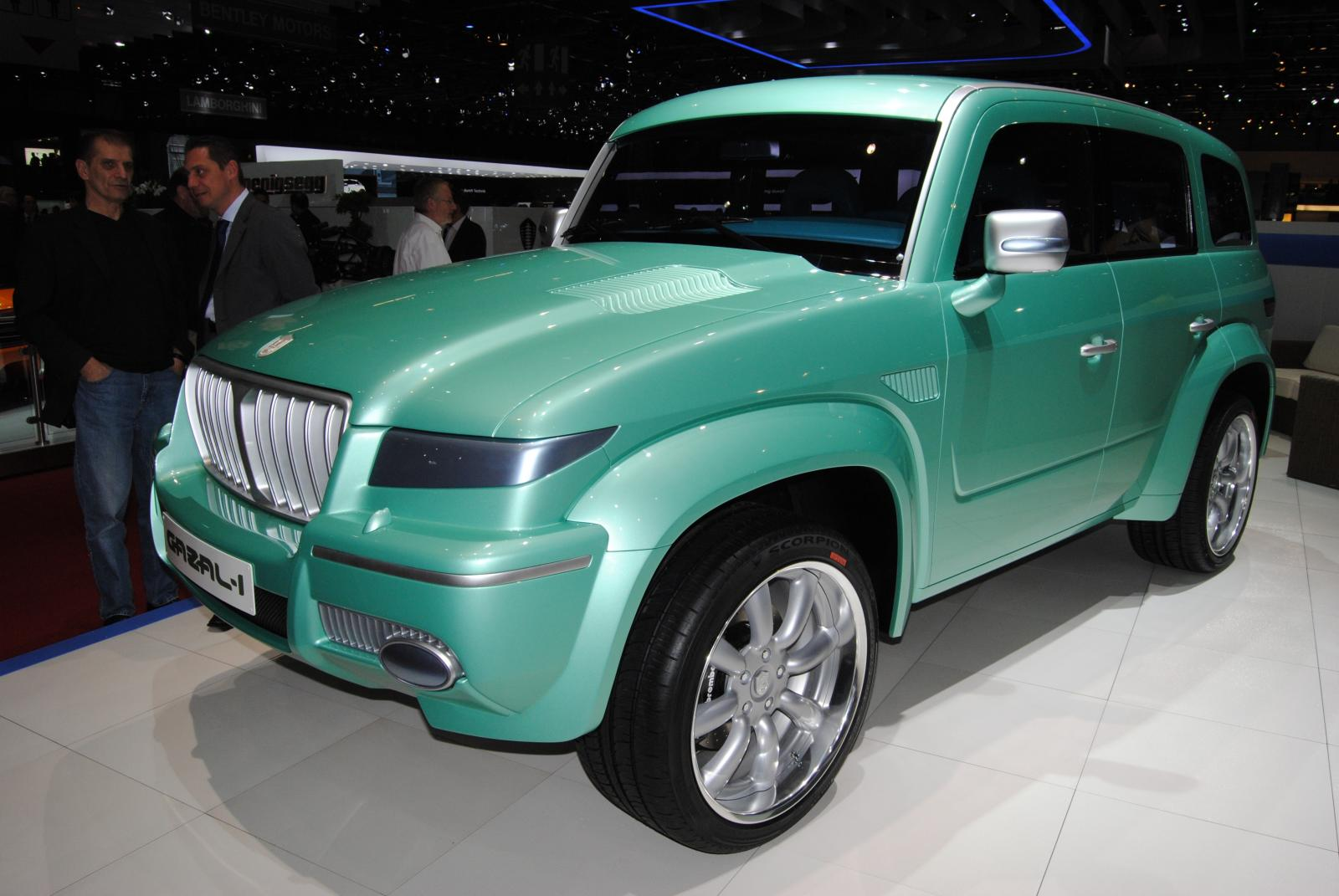

Overview
- Manufacturer: Magna Steyr & King Saud University
- Production: June 2010–present
- Assembly: Jeddah, Saudi Arabia
- Designer: Studiotorino

Body and chassis
- Class: Mid-size SUV
- Body style: 5-door wagon
- Layout: Front engine / Four-wheel drive
- Related: Mercedes-Benz G-Class

Powertrain
- Engine: Mercedes-Benz M273 engine 5.5 L (335.6 cu in): 285 kW (382 hp); 530 N⋅m (390 lbf⋅ft); V8 petrol engine

Dimensions
- Wheelbase: 112.2 in (2,850 mm)
- Length: 188.97 in (4,800 mm)
- Width: 74.8 in (1,900 mm)

The KSU Gazal-1 (Arabic for ‘gazelle') is a sport utility vehicle developed by students at King Saud University and technicians from Magna Steyr. The mass production began on 14 June 2010 under King Abdullah Bin Abdulaziz of Saudi Arabia. The managers of the project are Dr. Abdul Rahman Alahmari and Dr. Saed Darweesh. Dr. Khalid Alsaleh, who registered patents for the vehicle, mentioned in a TV interview that environment specific tests such as camel collision tolerance were conducted.

The car is the fourth home-made Arab automobile, after the Egyptian-made Ramses, the Moroccan-made Laraki and the Libyan-made Saroukh el-Jamahiriya. With a projected output of 20,000 for 2011, the Gazal-1 was the first Arab vehicle to be mass-produced in the Arab World.

The KSU Gazal-1 is based on the long wheelbase Mercedes-Benz G-Class and was designed by Studiotorino. Most of the automotive parts are produced by Magna Steyr in Austria.
