= VarioCam =

Automobile variable valve timing technology

VarioCam is an automobile variable valve timing technology developed by Porsche. VarioCam varies the timing of the intake valves by adjusting the tension on the timing chain connecting the intake and exhaust camshafts. VarioCam was first used on the 1992 3.0 L engine in the Porsche 968.

Porsche's more recent VarioCam Plus combines variable valve timing with two-stage lift on the intake side. The two-stage valve-lift function is performed by electro-hydraulically operated switchable tappets. Each of these 12 tappets consists of concentric lifters which can be locked together by means of a pin. The inner lifter is actuated by a small cam lobe, while the outer ring element is moved by a pair of larger-profile lobes. The timing of each valve is seamlessly adjusted by means of an electro-hydraulically operated rotary vane adjuster at the head of each intake camshaft.

Valve timing and the valve profile are continuously altered according to conditions and engine load. For improved responsiveness on cold starts, VarioCam Plus raises the amount of lift and retards valve timing. At medium revs with minimal loads, the valve lift is lowered and timing advanced to help minimize fuel consumption and emissions. For maximum power and torque, the lift is raised and the timing is advanced. This system debuted on the 1999 Porsche 996 Turbo.

A system similar to the VarioCam Plus system was developed by Subaru for the redesigned EZ30R H6 engine, which debuted in 2003 in the Legacy and Outback.
