= Ruf Ehra =

Overview
- Manufacturer: Ruf Automobile GmbH
- Production: 2026–present
- Assembly: Pfaffenhausen, Germany

Body and chassis
- Class: Sports car (S)
- Body style: 2-door coupé
- Layout: Longitudinally-mounted, rear-engine, four-wheel-drive

Powertrain
- Engine: 3.6 L (3,600 cc) twin-turbocharged flat-6
- Power output: 650 hp (659 PS; 485 kW); 900 N⋅m (664 lb⋅ft) of torque
- Transmission: 7-speed manual

Dimensions
- Wheelbase: 2,342 mm (92.2 in)
- Length: 4,207 mm (165.6 in)
- Width: 1,871 mm (73.7 in)
- Height: 1,278 mm (50.3 in)
- Curb weight: 1,325 kg (2,921 lb)

The Ruf Ehra is a high performance sports car manufactured by German automobile manufacturer Ruf Automobile. The vehicle made its debut at the Monterey Car Week in August 2026.

== History ==
The Ehra was first presented in August 2026 at Monterey Car Week in California. It is named after the Ehra-Lessien test track of the Volkswagen Group in Lower Saxony, where the manufacturer set a speed record for road-legal cars with a Ruf CTR in 1987.

== Specifications ==
Although the Ehra looks like a Porsche 911, it is an in-house development by Ruf Automobile. The carbon monocoque is already used in the Ruf CTR Anniversary, which has been in production since 2019, but the body is 58 mm wider. A retractable spoiler is integrated into the rear decklid. The Ehra is 4207 mm long and 1278 mm high. Its curb weight is listed as 1,325 kg (2,921 lb). A double wishbone suspension, combined with a horizontal pushrod spring-damper system, is fitted at both the front and rear. The 5-spoke wheels have a center lock.

The Ehra is powered by a twin-turbocharged 3.6-liter six-cylinder boxer engine, which produces up to 650 hp (659 PS; 485 kW) and achieves a maximum torque of 900 N⋅m (664 lb⋅ft). The vehicle has a 7-speed manual transmission and variable, switchable all-wheel drive. It is said to accelerate from 0 to 100 km/h in 3.3 seconds, and its top speed is 340 km/h (210 mph).
