= RGT =

RGT or Rgt has several uses including:

- Rgt. a common abbreviation for regiment
- Ruf RGT a German car
- Group RGT, a rallying category
- RGT, National Rail station code for Rugeley Town railway station, Staffordshire, England
