= Dakara =

Dakara may refer to:

- Dakara, a fictional planet in the mythology of Stargate
- Ruf Dakara, a vehicle by German automobile Ruf Automobile
