= Ruf Rt 12 =

RUF RT 12
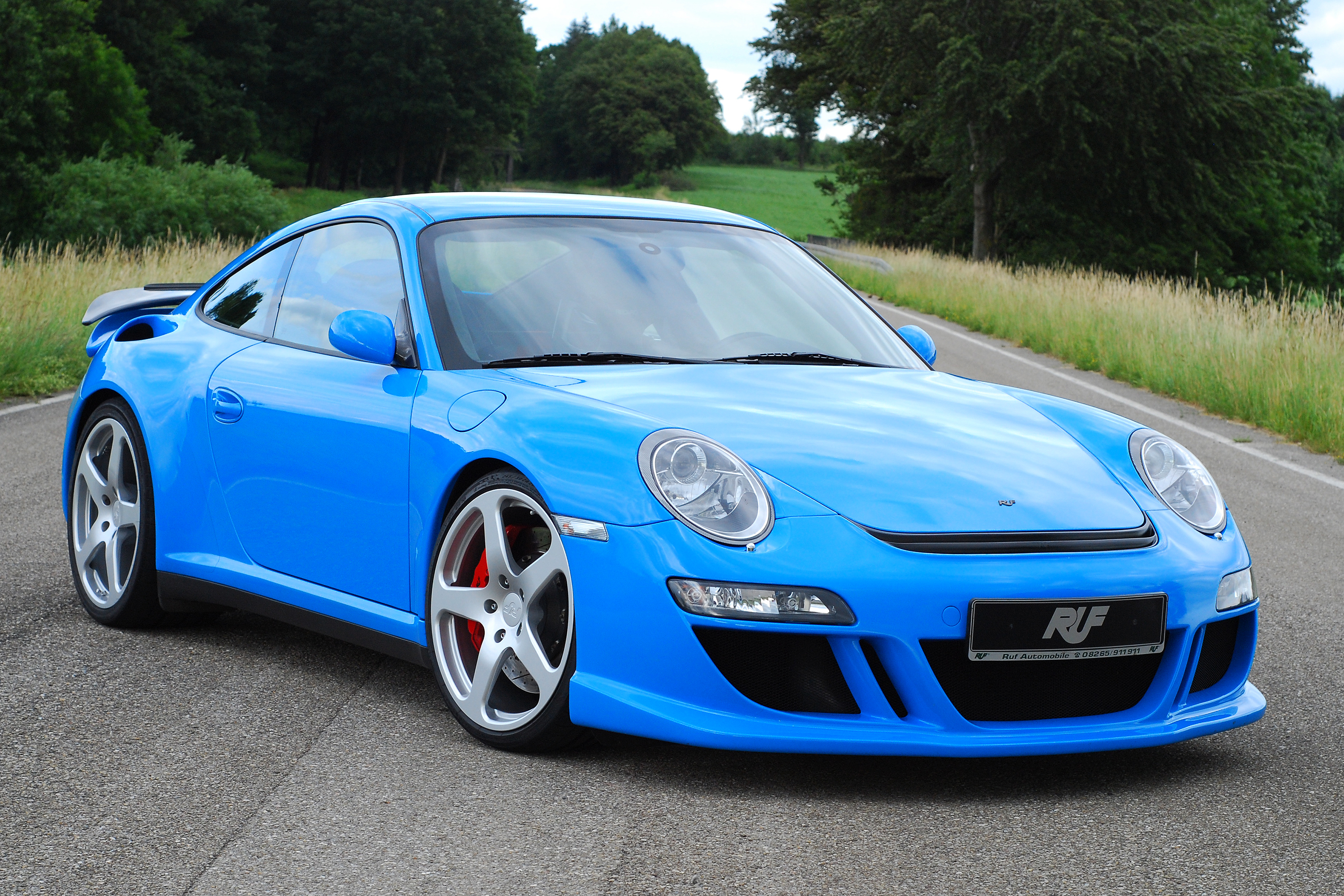

Overview
- Manufacturer: RUF
- Production: 2004–2012

Body and chassis
- Class: Sports car (S)
- Body style: 2-door coupé
- Layout: Rear-engine, rear-wheel-drive / four wheel drive
- Platform: Porsche 911 (997)
- Related: RUF CTR3; RUF RGT

Powertrain
- Engine: 3.8 L twin-turbocharged RUF RTurbo 590 Flat-6
- Transmission: 6-speed manual

Dimensions
- Length: 4,495 mm (177.0 in)
- Width: 1,882 mm (74.1 in)
- Height: 1,270 mm (50.0 in)
- Curb weight: 1,500 kg (3,307 lb)

Chronology
- Successor: Ruf RTR

The RUF RT 12 is a sports car built by RUF Automobile of Germany and based on the 997-generation Porsche 911.

== Model information ==
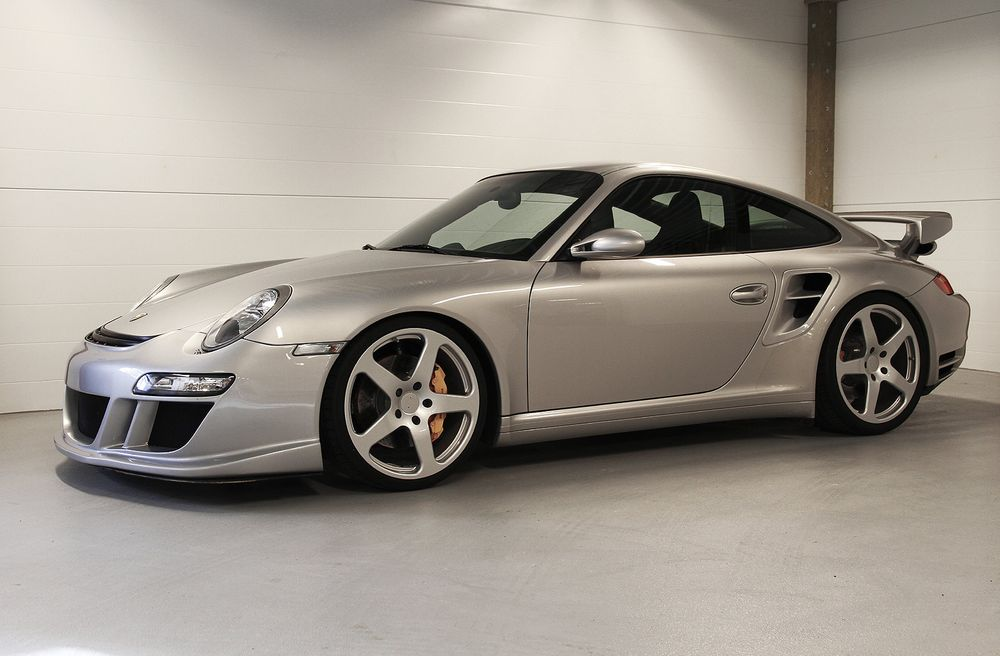
Ruf Rt 12 S (the car retains the standard cooling ducts found on the 911 Turbo)

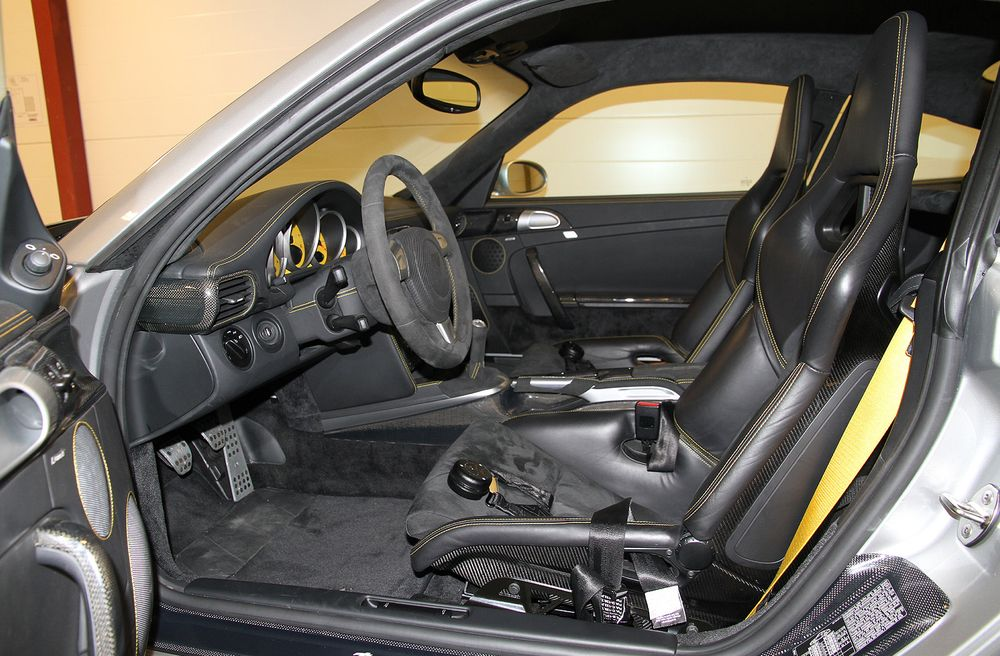
Interior

Ruf introduced the model in Autumn 2004 at the Essen Motor Show as the first of their offerings built on Porsche's then new 997 platform. A twin-turbocharged 3.6-litre flat-six engine based on the previous 996 Turbo's engine is rated between 530 and 560 PS (523 and 552 hp; 390 and 412 kW) options while the bored-out to 102 mm (4.02 in) and destroked to 76.4 mm (3.01 in) for a total displacement of 3.7 L; 228.6 cu in (3,746 cc). The engine is rated at 685 PS (676 hp; 504 kW) at 7,000 rpm and 880 N⋅m (649 lbf⋅ft) at 4,000 rpm on "S" trim; or 730 PS (720 hp; 537 kW) at 7,000 rpm and 940 N⋅m (693 lbf⋅ft) at 3,500 rpm on "R" trim. Modifications include replacement of the VTG turbochargers with KKK units, a cast alloy intake manifold, gas-flowed cylinder heads, larger throttle bodies, and 102 mm Mahle pistons with custom built camshafts. The turbochargers have a boost of 1.3 bar (18.9 psi). The engine has a redline of 7,500 rpm.

The Rt 12 features specially developed Ruf bodywork, giving the vehicle a unique appearance while functioning to increase downforce, improving high speed stability. Large cross-drilled brakes are included, although some debate has arisen as to how much of an upgrade the system provides over the factory-optional ceramic brakes (PCCB) that Porsche offers on "S" model 997s. Due to doubts over the PCCB system, Ruf chose not to opt them for the Rt12. In addition, Ruf replaced the factory "active" suspension system with a static system of their own design. A system with hydraulic control, developed together with Öhlins, which can raise ride-height in situations such as driveway entries is available as an option. The Rt12 exterior is distinguished from the standard Porsche 997 Turbo by the air tunnels on the rear haunches supplying allegedly cooler air for the twin turbochargers than the lower tunnels in the Porsche.

In total, 13 cars were made. Rear-wheel-drive was available as an option. All but two customers have ordered their Ruf Rt 12 with AWD.

== Performance ==
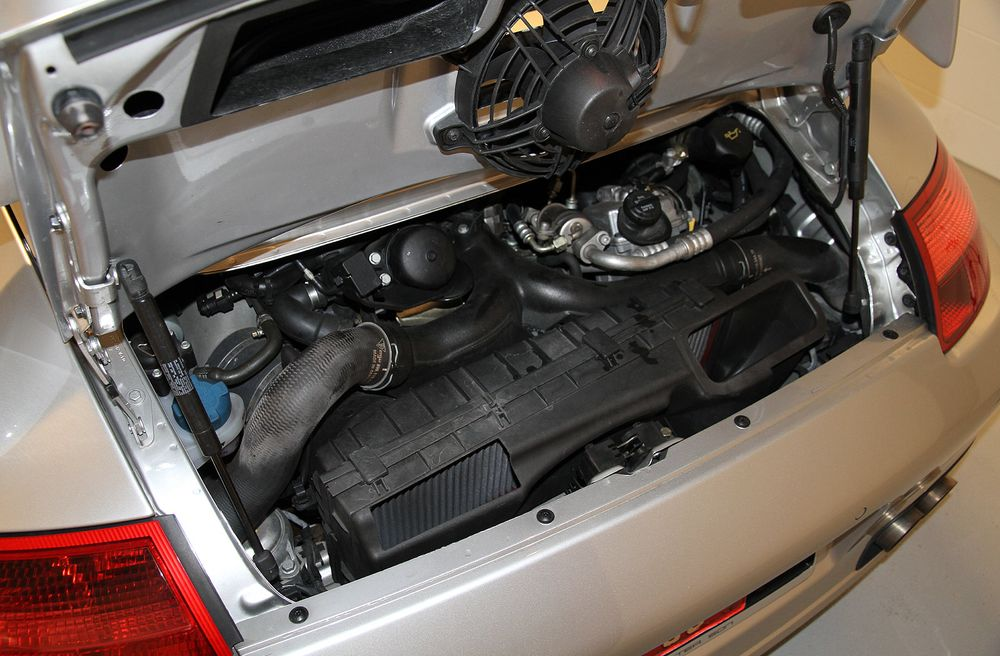
Engine

The Rt 12 has a 0-97 km/h (60 mph) time of 3.8 seconds and a top speed of 352 km/h (219 mph) with standard gearing, very similar to the RUF CTR2's 217 mph record from 1996. This gave it superior straight-line performance when compared to similar sports cars such as the Ferrari Enzo, Porsche Carrera GT, and Mercedes-Benz SLR McLaren. Comparable sports cars include the McLaren MP4-12C (which is faster off the line but has a slightly lower top speed.)

Although the top speed is officially reported as 352 km/h (219 mph), there is an optional taller gearing package which is reported to boost the car's top speed to 360 km/h (224 mph).
