= Ruf RCT =

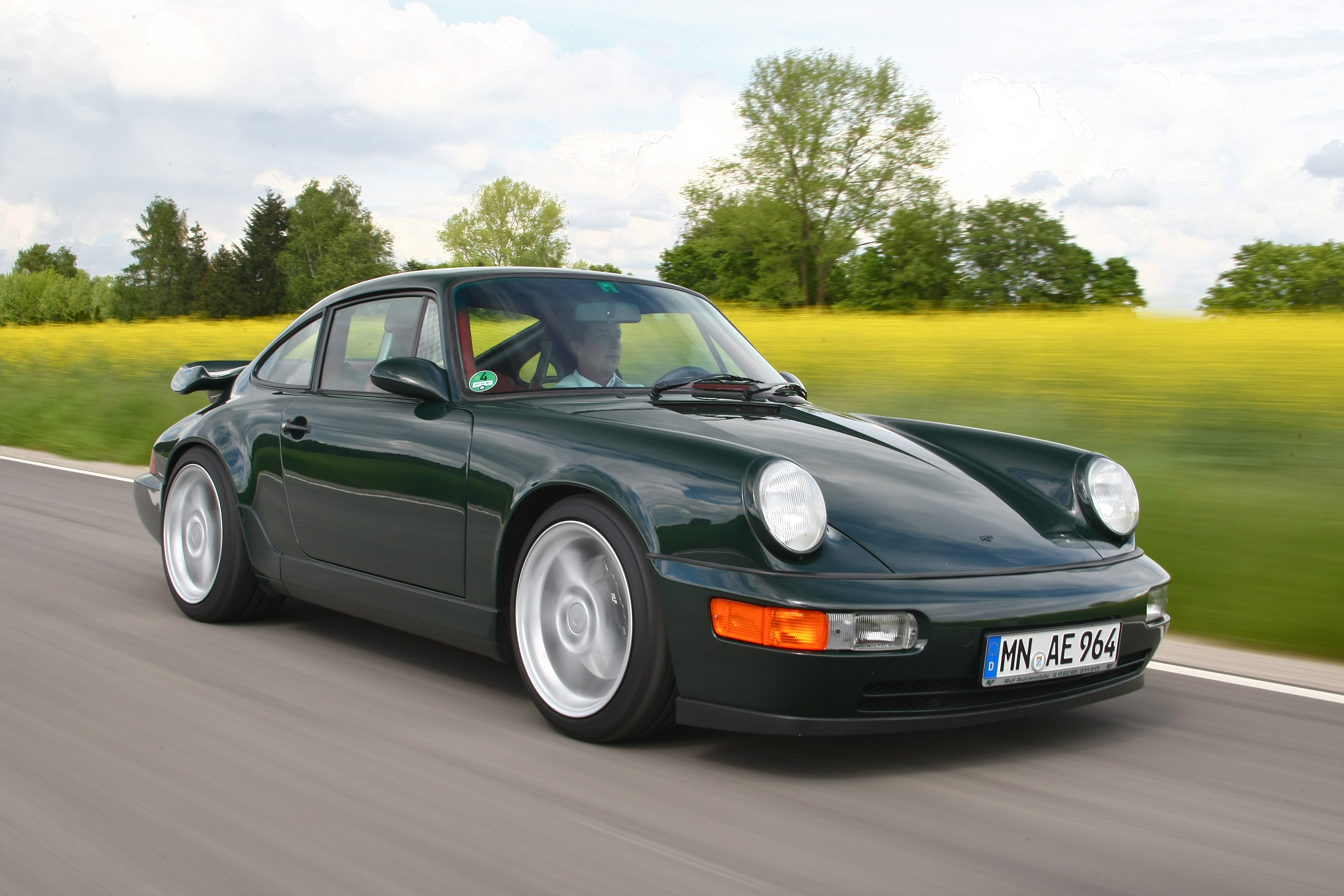

Overview
- Manufacturer: Ruf Automobile GmbH
- Production: 1992–1997
- Assembly: Pfaffenhausen, Germany

Body and chassis
- Class: Sports car (S)
- Body style: 2-door coupé
- Layout: Longitudinally-mounted, rear-engine, rear-wheel-drive

Powertrain
- Engine: 3.6 L (3,600 cc) turbocharged flat-6
- Power output: 370 hp (375 PS; 276 kW); 536 N⋅m (395 lb⋅ft) of torque
- Transmission: 6-speed manual

Dimensions
- Wheelbase: 2,450 mm (96 in)
- Length: 4,250 mm (167 in)
- Width: 1,652 mm (65.0 in)
- Height: 1,310 mm (52 in)
- Curb weight: 1,400 kg (3,086 lb)

The Ruf RCT is a sports car manufactured by German automobile manufacturer Ruf Automobile. This car is based on the Porsche 911.

== History ==
The RCT (abbreviation of "Ruf Carrera Turbo") came into production in 1992. At the time, the Ruf workshops had spare parts for the Porsche 964, Carrera 2, Carrera 4 and Carrera RS; the dismantling of these models resulted in components for the creation of the Ruf BTR III and BTR 3.8.

To accommodate the turbocharger, several original parts had to be replaced. Alois Ruf Jr. used these parts for their turbo system, all installed in the chassis of the 964, which created the Ruf RCT. It offered performance similar to that of its predecessor, the BTR.

The later model developed a similar design, the RCT EVO.

== RCT EVO ==
The RCT EVO is a car that is similar to the original RCT. It was available in various versions such as narrow, wide, coupé, convertible, targa, rear-wheel drive, or all-wheel drive. The engine has a displacement of 3.8 liters. It has 425 horsepower of power at 5,800 rpm and 570 N m of torque at 4,800 rpm.
