= Ruf SCR (2018) =

- SCR 2018 finished in "Irish Green"

Overview
- Manufacturer: Ruf Automobile GmbH
- Production: 2018–present
- Designer: Freeman Thomas

Body and chassis
- Class: Sports car (S)
- Body style: 2-door coupé
- Layout: Rear-engine, rear-wheel-drive
- Related: Ruf CTR Anniversary

Powertrain
- Engine: 4.0 L RUF375 flat-six
- Power output: 510 PS (503 hp; 375 kW); 471 N⋅m (347 lb⋅ft) of torque
- Transmission: 6-speed manual

Dimensions
- Wheelbase: 2,342 mm (92.2 in)
- Length: 4,207 mm (165.6 in)
- Width: 1,819 mm (71.6 in)
- Height: 1,265 mm (49.8 in)
- Curb weight: 1,250 kg (2,756 lb)

Chronology
- Predecessor: Ruf SCR

The Ruf SCR is a rear-engined sports car manufactured by German automobile manufacturer Ruf Automobile. Introduced in 2018, the styling of the SCR 2018 is inspired by the Porsche 911 (964) and its introduction pays homage to the original Ruf SCR, but the new SCR uses a completely bespoke carbon-fibre monocoque chassis and body work.

== Overview ==
The SCR 2018 was built as a tribute to the original SCR that was introduced in 1978 with a 3.2-liter naturally-aspirated flat-six. Other subsequent SCR models were built over the years, such as the SCR 4.2 in 2016. The SCR 2018 is styled using the exterior design of the Porsche 964 as its basis but no parts are shared with the 964 in the new model, as the body and chassis are bespoke Ruf items. The exterior of the SCR features Ruf designed center-locking double-5-spoke wheels as well as a retractable spoiler. The interior has fixed back hound’s-tooth Recaro seats in order to save weight. Ruf says they plan on building 15 SCRs per year starting in 2019 at a price of €650,000 (roughly $800,000), and they will be available for the American market.

== Performance ==
The SCR 2018 is powered by a rear-mounted, water cooled 4.0-litre flat-six engine, which like the original SCR, is naturally-aspirated. It generates a maximum power output of 510 PS (375 kW; 503 hp) at 8,270 rpm and 471 N⋅m (347 lb⋅ft) of torque at 5,760 rpm and can attain a top speed of 320 km/h (199 mph). Freeman Thomas, one of the engineers who worked with Ruf on the car quoted that the engine block is based loosely on Porsche's old "Mezger" flat-six used in the 996 and 997 GT3. The SCR utilises a carbon-fibre monocoque chassis and bodywork developed in house by the manufacturer and has an integrated steel roll-cage. The car uses push rod suspension with remote reservoir Sachs dampers in the front and rear and carbon ceramic brakes with 6 piston calipers in the front and 4 piston in the rear. Power goes to the rear wheels through a six-speed manual transmission.

== Gallery ==
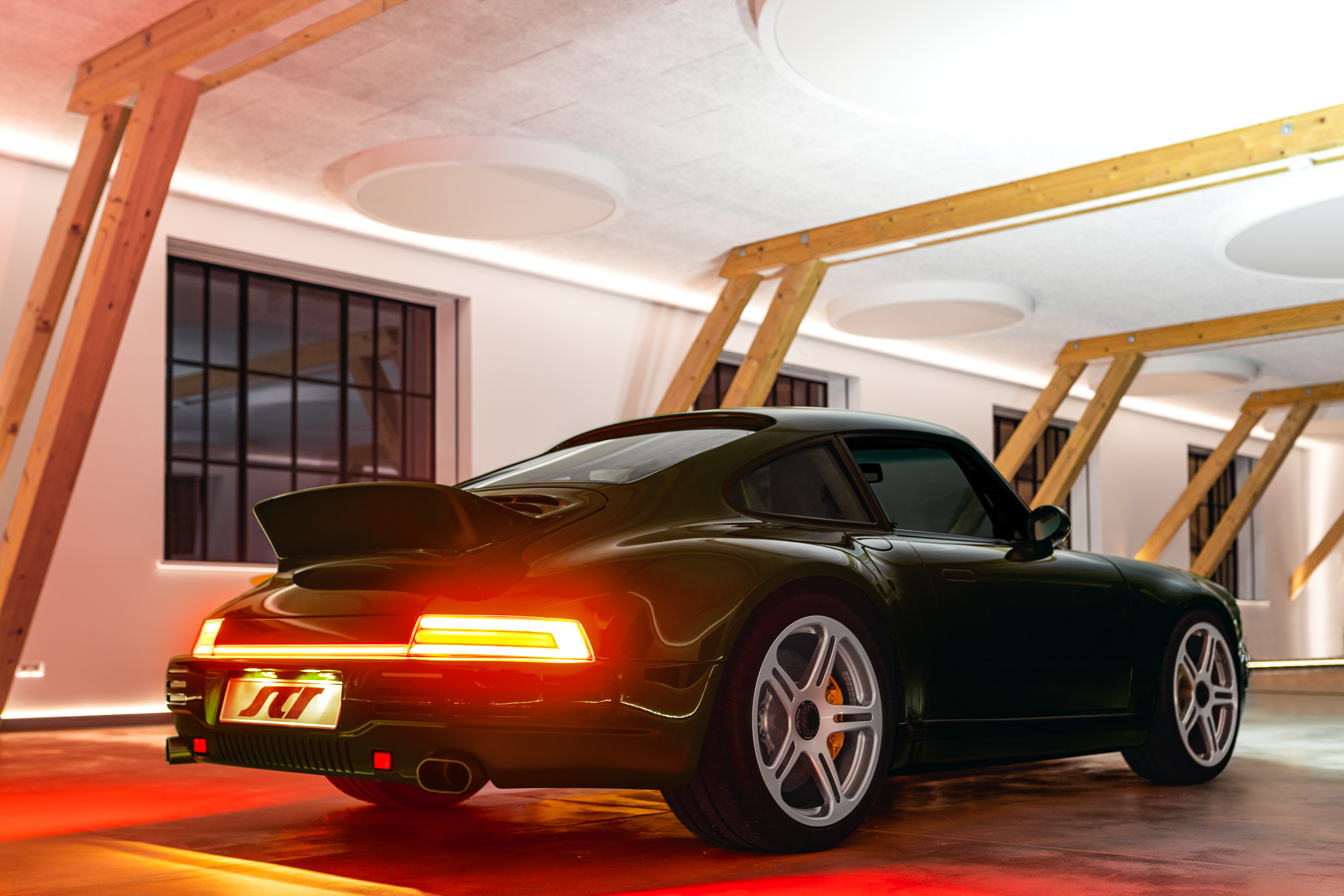
Rear end

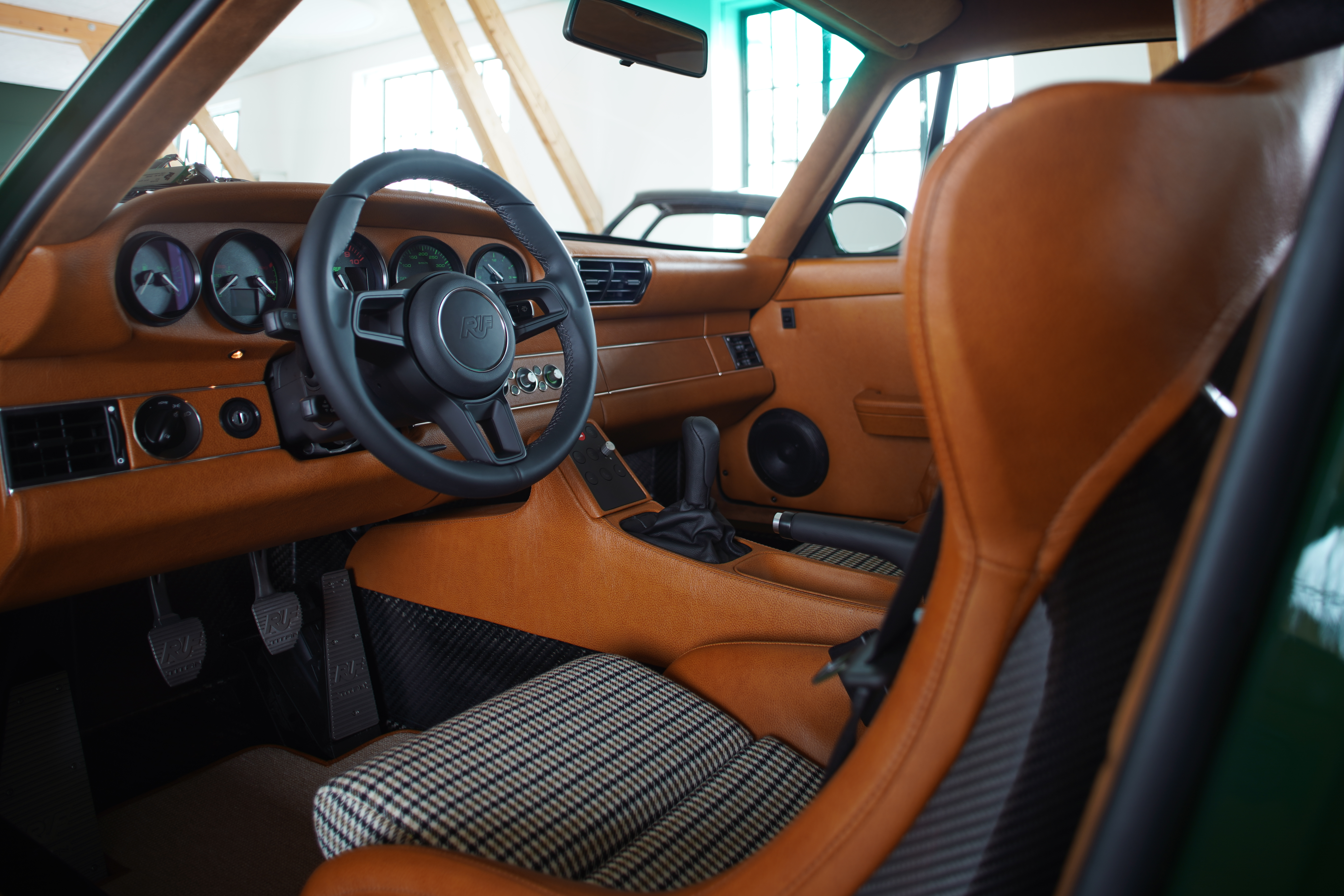
Interior

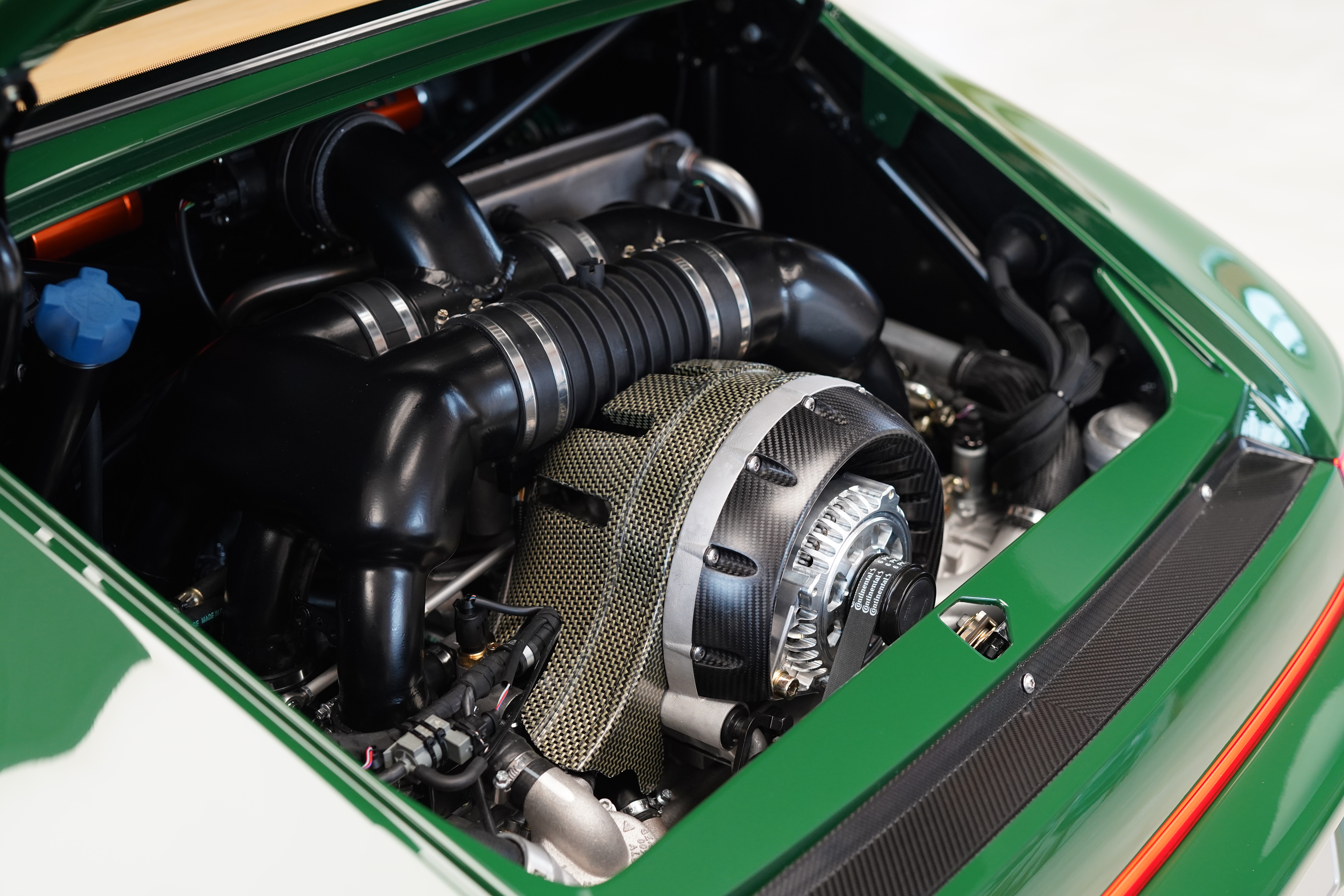
Engine
