= Ruf SCR =

Sports car manufactured by Ruf Automobile

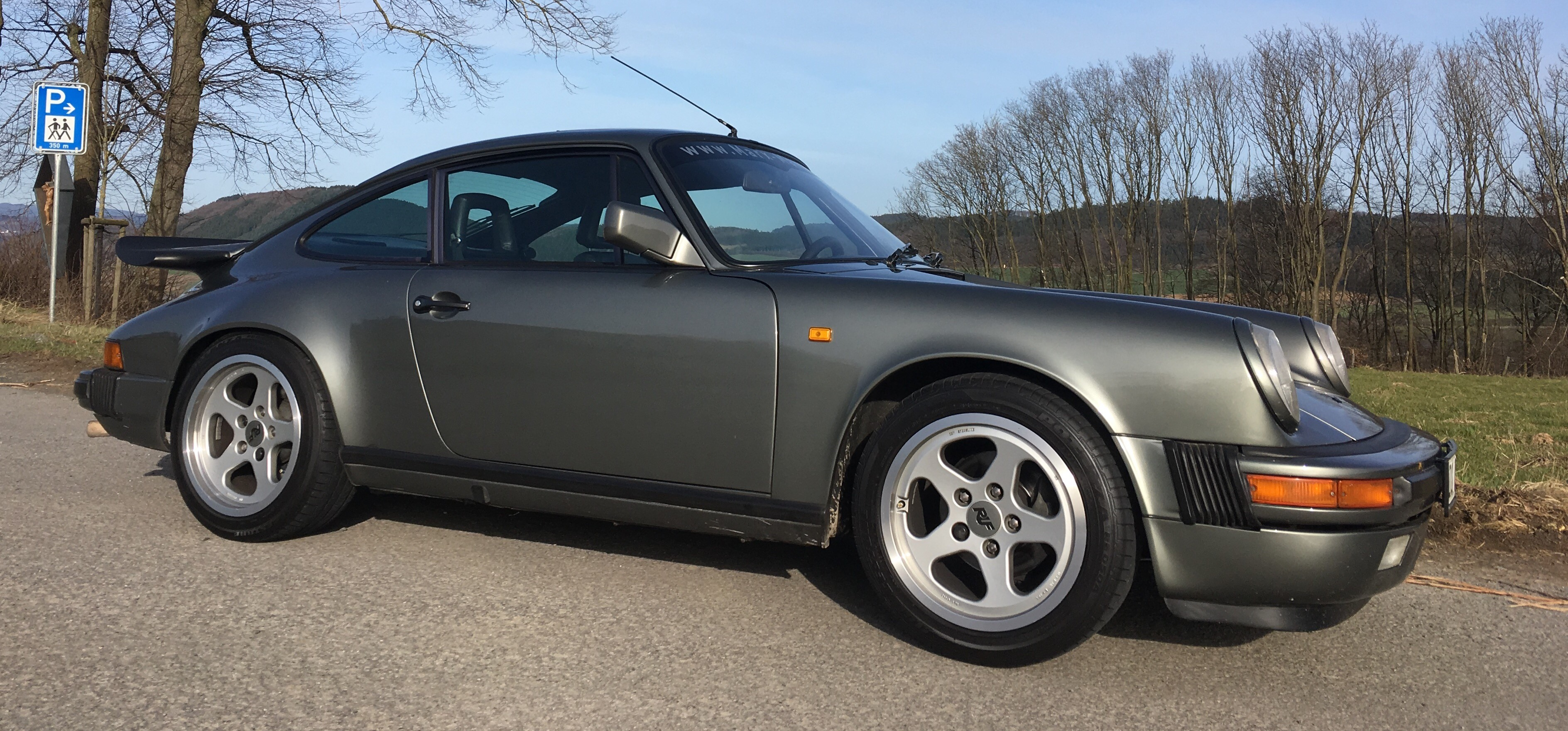

Overview
- Manufacturer: Ruf Automobile GmbH
- Production: 1978–1981
- Assembly: Pfaffenhausen, Germany

Body and chassis
- Class: Sports car (S)
- Body style: 2-door coupé
- Layout: Rear-engine, rear-wheel-drive
- Related: Porsche 911

Powertrain
- Engine: 3.2 L (3,185 cc) flat-6
- Power output: 215 PS (158 kW; 212 hp); 280 N⋅m (207 lbf⋅ft)
- Transmission: 5-speed manual

Dimensions
- Wheelbase: 2,272 mm (89.4 in)
- Length: 4,291 mm (168.9 in)
- Width: 1,652 mm (65.0 in)
- Height: 1,320 mm (52.0 in)
- Curb weight: 1,110 kg (2,447 lb)

Chronology
- Successor: Ruf BTR; Ruf SCR 2018

The Ruf SCR is a sports car manufactured by German automobile manufacturer Ruf Automobile. The SCR (sometimes written "SC/R") was based on the Porsche 911 SC and the changes made to its engine enabled it to have similar performance to the 930 Turbo, despite having a naturally aspirated engine.

== History ==
Due to the Gulf Oil Crisis of the 1970s and more strict emission laws, Porsche like many other car manufacturers at that time, reduced the power output of its naturally aspirated flat-six engine to 180 PS (132 kW; 178 hp) thus creating a huge power and performance gap in its naturally aspirated 911 lineage and the Turbo. Those wanting a model lying in-between that gap had to opt for the expensive and luxurious 928 grand tourer.

Seeing the potential of the naturally aspirated engine to generate a higher power output while maintaining fuel economy, Ruf introduced the SCR in 1978 based on the 911 SC. This marked the first Ruf modification done to a Porsche 911. Key changes over the 911 SC included an engine with an enlarged capacity of 3,185 cc generating a maximum power output of 215 PS (158 kW; 212 hp) at 6,000 rpm. The extra displacement was gained by boring out the engine by 3 mm (0.12 in), while the new pistons were designed so as to increase the compression from 8.5 to 9.8:1. This was combined with a special Ruf-built gearbox with a longer fifth gear, along with a Bosch K-Jetronic fuel injection system and front mounted oil coolers, thus achieving the desired fuel efficiency whilst maintaining a higher power output than the donor car (17.3L/100km). The SCR did require high octane ("Super") petrol rather than the regular octane fuel used by Porsche's own 911 SC, however.

Other aesthetic changes included the "whale tail" spoiler found on the 930 Turbo, a deep chin spoiler at the front, a new front bumper with integrated round brake cooling ducts, optional wide wheel arches as found on the 930 Turbo and special Ruf 5-spoke alloy wheels. The car had a Spartan driver-focused interior with racing bucket seats and six-point racing harness. All of these changes enabled the SCR to achieve performance levels closely approximating those of the Turbo.

The SCR, with its performance filled the void left between the naturally aspirated 911 models and the Turbo while still costing less than the latter at 65,000 DM (the 930 Turbo had a price tag of 79,000 DM while the 911 SC and the 928 had price tags of 41,860 and 60,707 DM respectively). Its publicity in German automobile magazines at the time of its introduction made it a commercial success.

== Performance ==
The SCR could accelerate from 0–100 km/h (0–62 mph) in 5.7 seconds, 0–200 km/h (0–124 mph) in 23.7 seconds and could attain a top speed of 255 km/h (158 mph).

== Specifications ==
Engine:

- Longitudinally mounted air-cooled flat-6 engine
- 3,185 cc (3.2 L) of displacement
- Bore x stroke of 98.0 mm x 70.4 mm
- Bosch K-Jetronic mechanical fuel injection
- Chain driven Overhead Camshaft per cylinder bank
- Eight main bearing crankshaft
- Electronic fuel pump
- Dry sump lubrication system
- Compression ratio of 9.8:1
- Maximum power output: 215 PS (158 kW; 212 hp) at 6,000 rpm
- Maximum torque: 280 N⋅m (207 lb⋅ft) at 4,100 rpm
- Specific power output: 68.4 PS/L

Transmission:

- Type: 5-speed manual
- Clutch type: Single plate dry clutch
- Differential type: 80% limited slip differential

General:

- Drivetrain: Rear-wheel-drive
- Fuel tank capacity: 80-litres
- Battery: 12 volt lead acid battery
- Dry weight: 1,110 kg (2,447 lb)
- Weight (with fluids): 1,400 kg (3,086 lb)
- Weight distribution (front : rear): 39.6 : 60.4

== Later models ==
=== SCR 4.2 (2016) ===
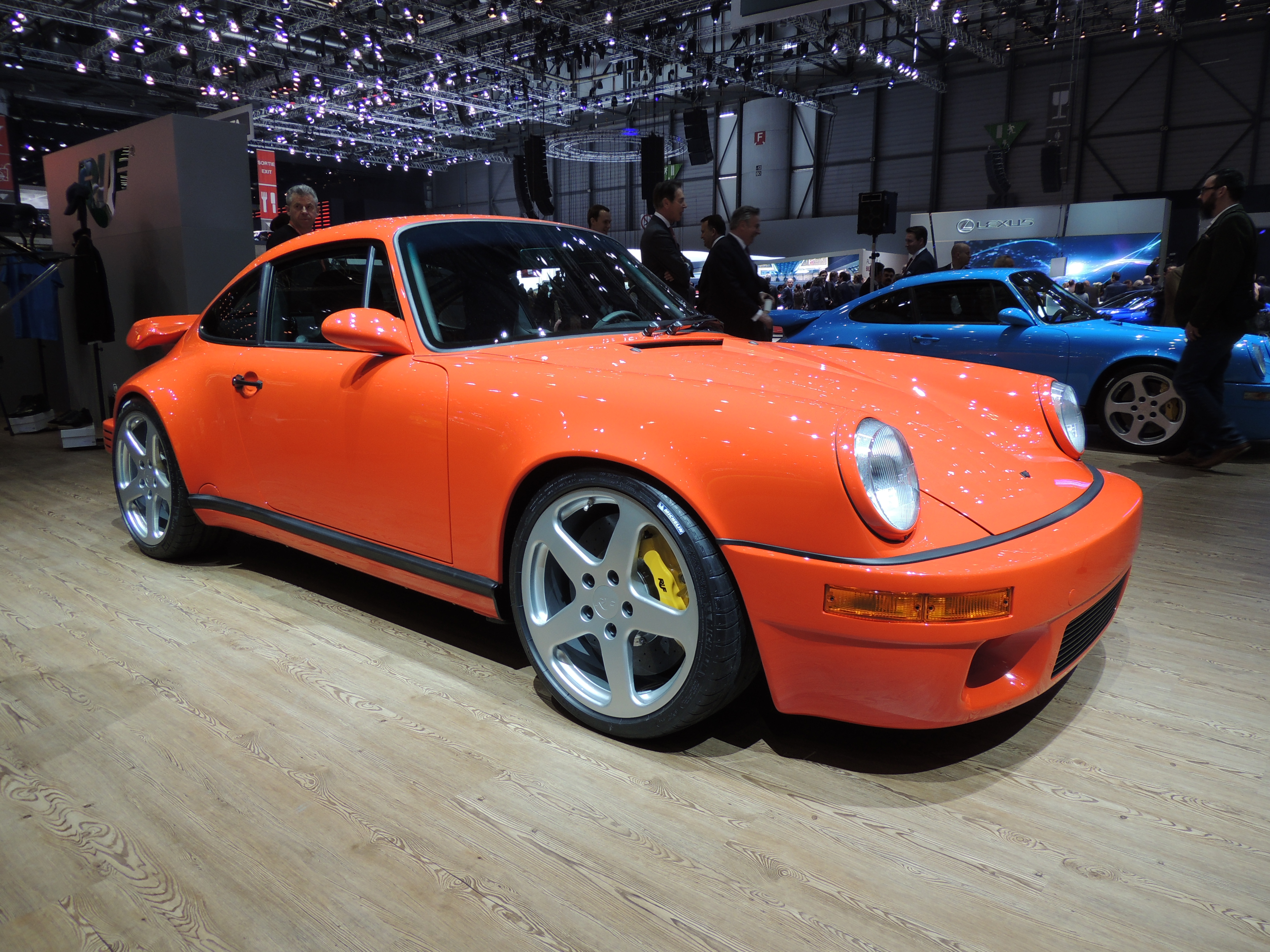
Ruf SCR 4.2

Introduced in 2016, the SCR 4.2 utilizes the Porsche 993's body-in-white and its multi-link suspension but has extensive use of carbon-fibre in its body work and an integrated roll-cage; the car looks Porsche 964. The SCR 4.2 uses the water-cooled "Metzger engine" found in the Porsche 997 GT3 but with its capacity increased to 4.2-litres and its power output increased to 525 PS (386 kW; 518 hp) and 500 N⋅m (369 lb⋅ft) of torque. Power is sent to the rear wheels via a 6-speed manual transmission with limited slip differential, enabling the car to accelerate to 100 km/h (62 mph) from a standstill in 4.1 seconds and on to a top speed of 322 km/h (200 mph). The dashboard comes from the Porsche 993, and it has racing bucket seats with 6-point harness and carbon-fibre, Alcantara and tartan trim. Like the original SCR, the SCR 4.2 features a whale tail rear wing and a front bumper with round brake cooling ducts. The car weighs 1,200 kg (2,646 lb).

=== SCR (2018) ===
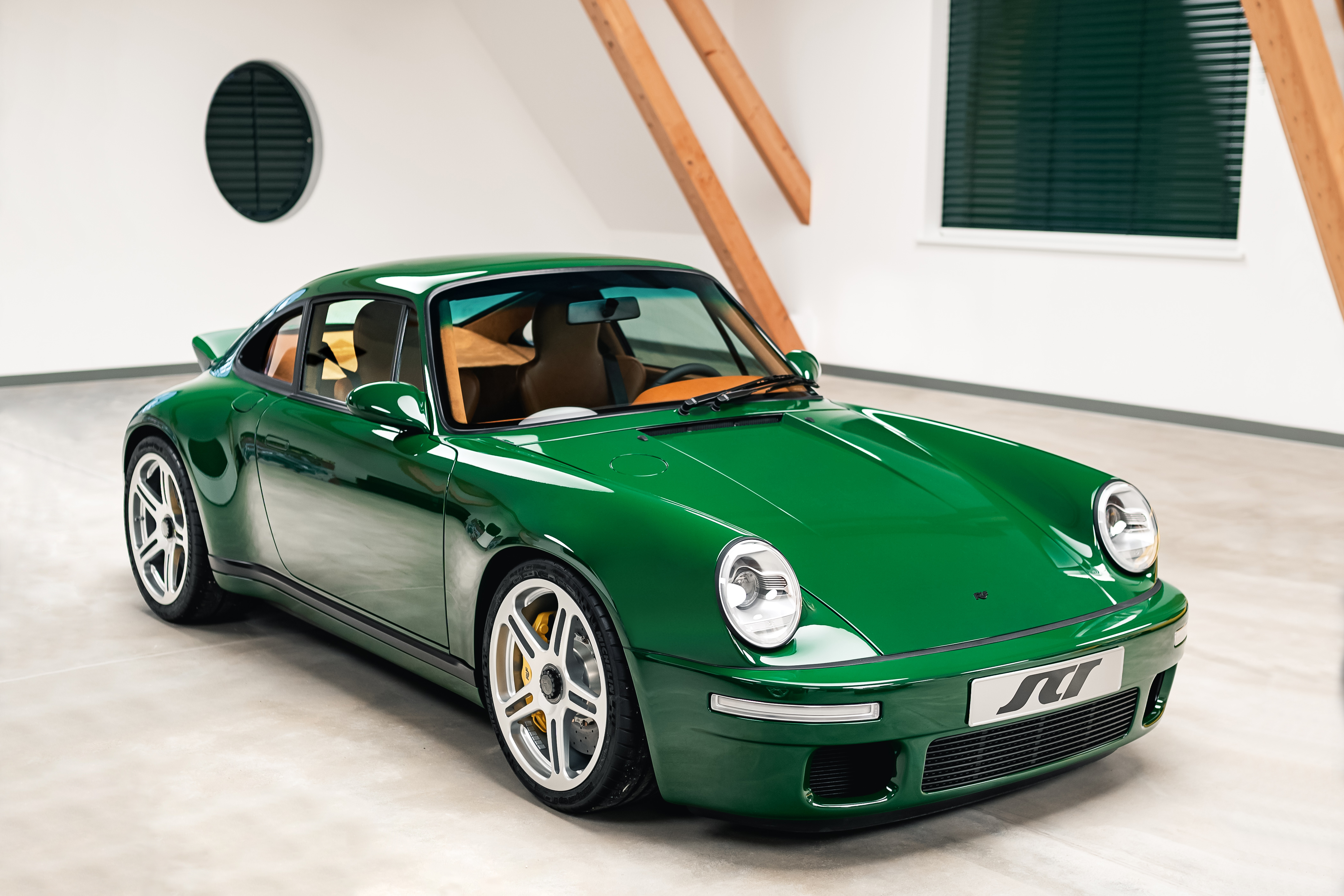
Ruf SCR 2018

At the 2018 Geneva Motor Show, exactly 40 years after the original SCR was introduced, Ruf introduced a new version of the SCR. The new SCR is based on the same principles as the CTR, introduced one year earlier, which includes parts built for the car from scratch. The new SCR has carbon fibre body work, an integrated roll-cage and a 4.0-litre naturally-aspirated flat-6 engine based on the unit found in the Porsche 911 GT3 RS 4.0, generating a maximum power output of 510 PS (375 kW; 503 hp) and 470 N⋅m (347 lb⋅ft) of torque with a red-line of 8,200 rpm. The car has a 6-speed manual transmission directing power to the rear wheels and an in-house developed push-rod suspension system. The optimum combination of power and weight propel the 1,270 kg (2,800 lb) car to a top speed of 320 km/h (199 mph). The car also has a carbon ceramic braking system for enhanced stopping power, with six-piston calipers at the front and four-piston calipers at the rear. Unlike the original SCR, the new SCR lacks the whale tail wing and features body work akin to the Porsche 964. The car was unveiled in the same shade of green as the original SCR.
