= ERuf Model A =

eRuf Model A
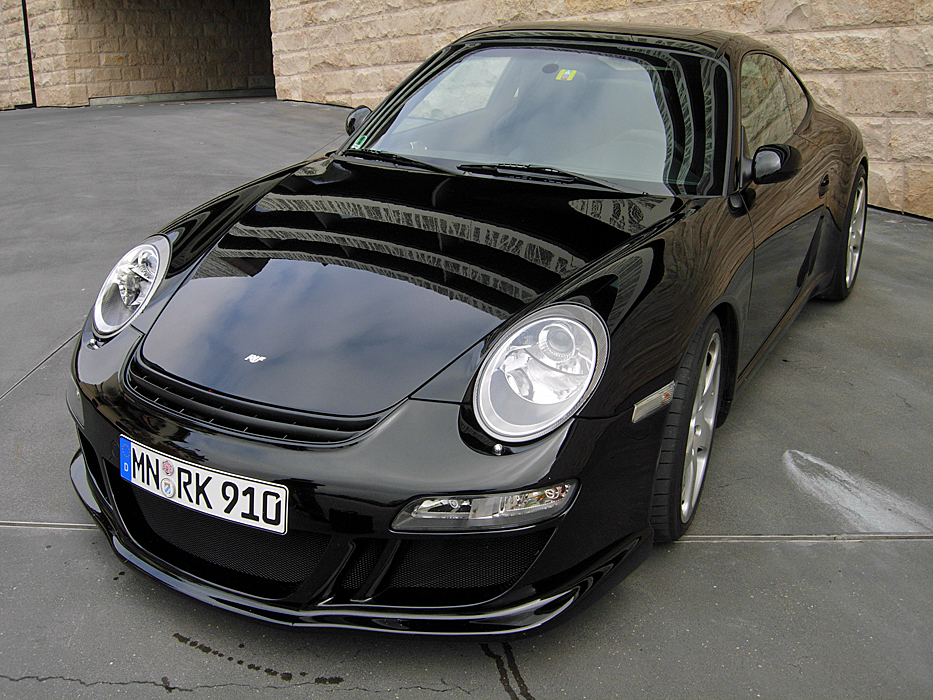

Overview
- Manufacturer: Ruf Automobile
- Also called: Ruf Greenster
- Production: 2008
- Assembly: Pfaffenhausen, Germany

Body and chassis
- Body style: 2-door coupe
- Layout: Rear-motor, rear-wheel drive
- Related: Porsche 911

Powertrain
- Electric motor: motor output up to 201 bhp (150 kW), 480 ft⋅lb (649 N⋅m), 3-phase AC induction motor
- Battery: 96-cell lithium-ion battery pack

Dimensions
- Curb weight: 1,910 kg (4,211 lb)

The eRuf Model A is a late-2000s all-electric concept sports car built by German automobile manufacturer Ruf Automobile. The car was powered by a UQM Technologies propulsion system (a UQM PowerPhase 150). The car has a top speed of 225 km/h (140 mph) and was capable of producing 150 kW (204 PS; 201 hp) of power and 479 lb⋅ft (649 N⋅m) of torque. Estimated range per charge was 250–320 km (155–199 mi), depending on performance level, using iron-phosphate, lithium-ion batteries built by Axeon plc of Great Britain. During coasting the engine works as a generator producing electricity to charge the batteries.

If a production car were to be built, it would be able to use a clutchless one- or two-speed transmission with no reverse gear as the electric motor can spin forward or in reverse. Ruf engaged Calmotors in Camarillo, California, specialized in the implementation of hybrid electric and electric only powertrain design, to combine the latest generation of lithium-ion batteries with its motor.

Ruf announced that it hoped to begin production of the eRuf in the fall of 2009. This did not happen, and at the 2009 Geneva Motor Show, Ruf announced a new model, the eRUF Greenster, with limited production planned to commence at the end of 2010.
