= Ruf R Kompressor =

Overview
- Manufacturer: Ruf
- Production: 2006–2009

Body and chassis
- Class: Sports car (S)
- Body style: 2-door coupé; 2-door convertible
- Layout: Rear engine, rear wheel drive / all wheel drive
- Related: Porsche 997

Powertrain
- Engine: 3.6 L (219.7 cu in) supercharged Flat-6; 3.8 L (231.9 cu in) supercharged flat-6
- Transmission: 6-speed manual 5-speed RUFtronic automatic

The Ruf R Kompressor is a sports car introduced in 2006 and built by Ruf Automobile of Germany. Like certain other Ruf models, The R Kompressor was offered both as a complete ground-up car with a unique Ruf VIN or as conversion for an existing 997 retaining the original Porsche VIN.

== Specifications ==
The R Kompressor is based on the Porsche 997 and is offered as a coupe or cabriolet as well, with a choice of rear-wheel drive or all-wheel drive and with a choice of a 3.6 or 3.8 liter flat-6 engine. All models come standard with a 6-speed manual transmission but a 5-speed RUFtronic automatic transmission with paddle shift was also offered as an option. Both the 3.6 and 3.8 engines have been upgraded with a centrifugal type (supercharger) and an intercooler for each cylinder row, as well as a new intake and exhaust system. The supercharged 3.6 L engine produces 409 hp (305 kW) at 7000 rpm and 332 lbf⋅ft (450 N⋅m) of torque at 5500 rpm. The supercharged 3.8 L engine produces 429 hp (320 kW) at 6000 rpm and 347 lb⋅ft (470 N⋅m) of torque between 2800 and 6200 rpm. Road & Track measured a 0-60 mph (0-97 km/h) time of 4.0 seconds for the 3.8. On the exterior, changes to the original 997 design include wider fenders, a restyled front air dam, new rear wing, side mirrors and the signature Ruf designed wheels measuring 19 x 8.5 inches in the front and 19 x 11 inches in the rear. Additionally, to save weight, the engine hood and spoiler are made of both Kevlar and carbon fiber. Mechanically, the R Kompressor features Ruf/Bilstein tuned suspension and high performance Ruf brakes. The interior features a slew of Ruf bits as well including the instrumentation, bucket seats, sport steering wheel, gear knob and aluminum foot rest and pedal set.
