= Ruf BTR2 =

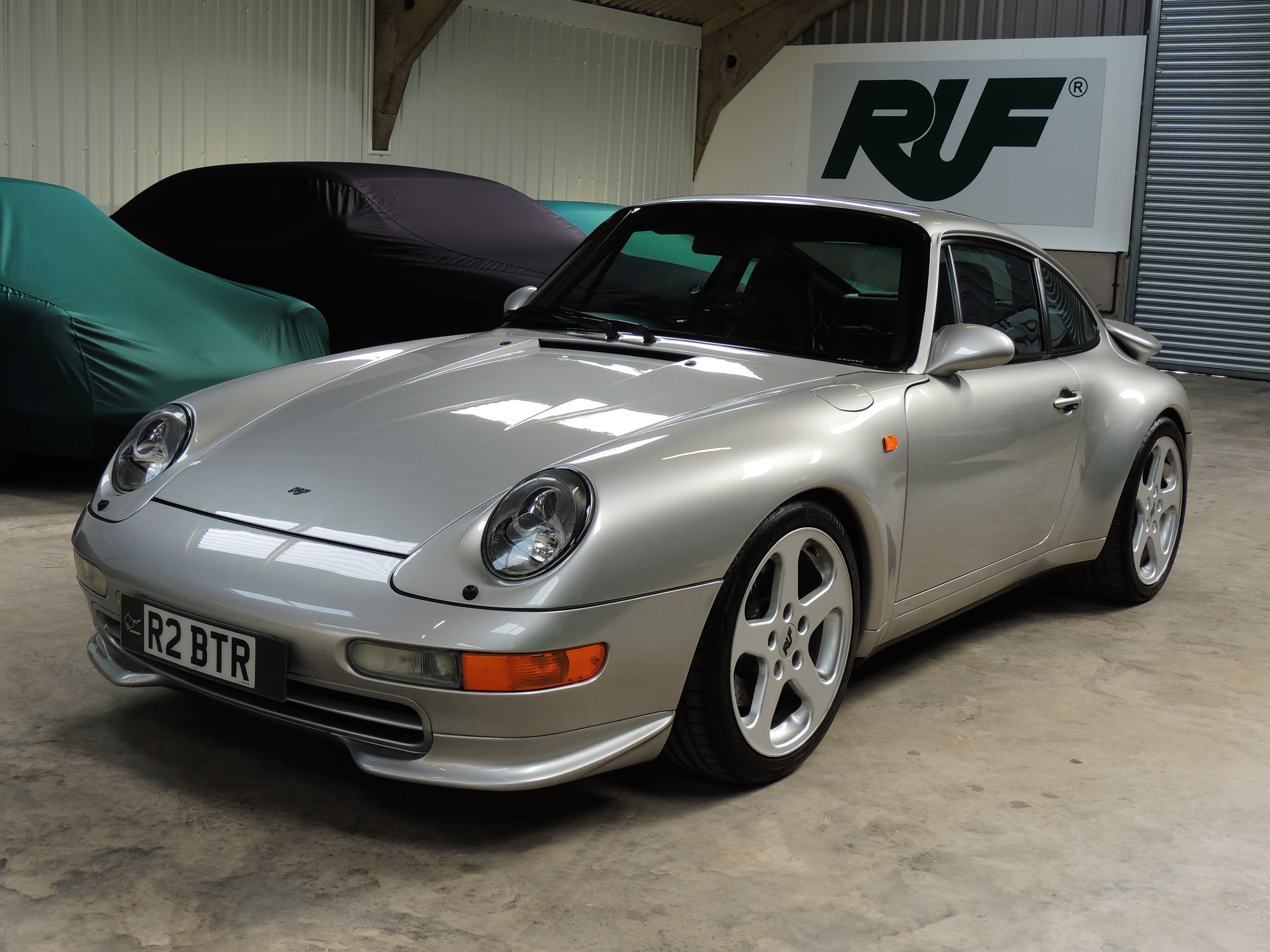
- 1998 Ruf BTR2

Overview
- Manufacturer: Ruf Automobile GmBH
- Production: 1993–1998 (9-13 produced)

Body and chassis
- Class: Sports car (S)
- Body style: 2-door coupé
- Layout: Rear-engine, rear-wheel-drive
- Related: Porsche 993; Ruf CTR2

Powertrain
- Engine: 3.6 L air-cooled, SOHC turbocharged flat-6
- Transmission: 6-speed manual

Chronology
- Predecessor: RUF BTR

The Ruf BTR2 is a sports car produced by Ruf Automobile. Based on the Porsche 993 Carrera, it succeeded the original BTR. The BTR2 was among the fastest road cars of its time, attaining a top speed of 308 km/h (191 mph).

== History ==
1995 Ruf BTR2 rear view

The BTR2 began production in 1993, as a homage to the company's first production car, shortly after the Porsche 911 (993) started production. It preceded the introduction of the 993 generation of the 911 Turbo by 2 years, making it the first turbocharged 993 model ever produced. The BTR2, based on the 911 Carrera, was only available with rear wheel drive, and featured a single turbo setup and narrow bodywork, while the 993 Turbo had an all wheel drive system, twin sequential turbochargers and wide bodywork.

== Specifications ==
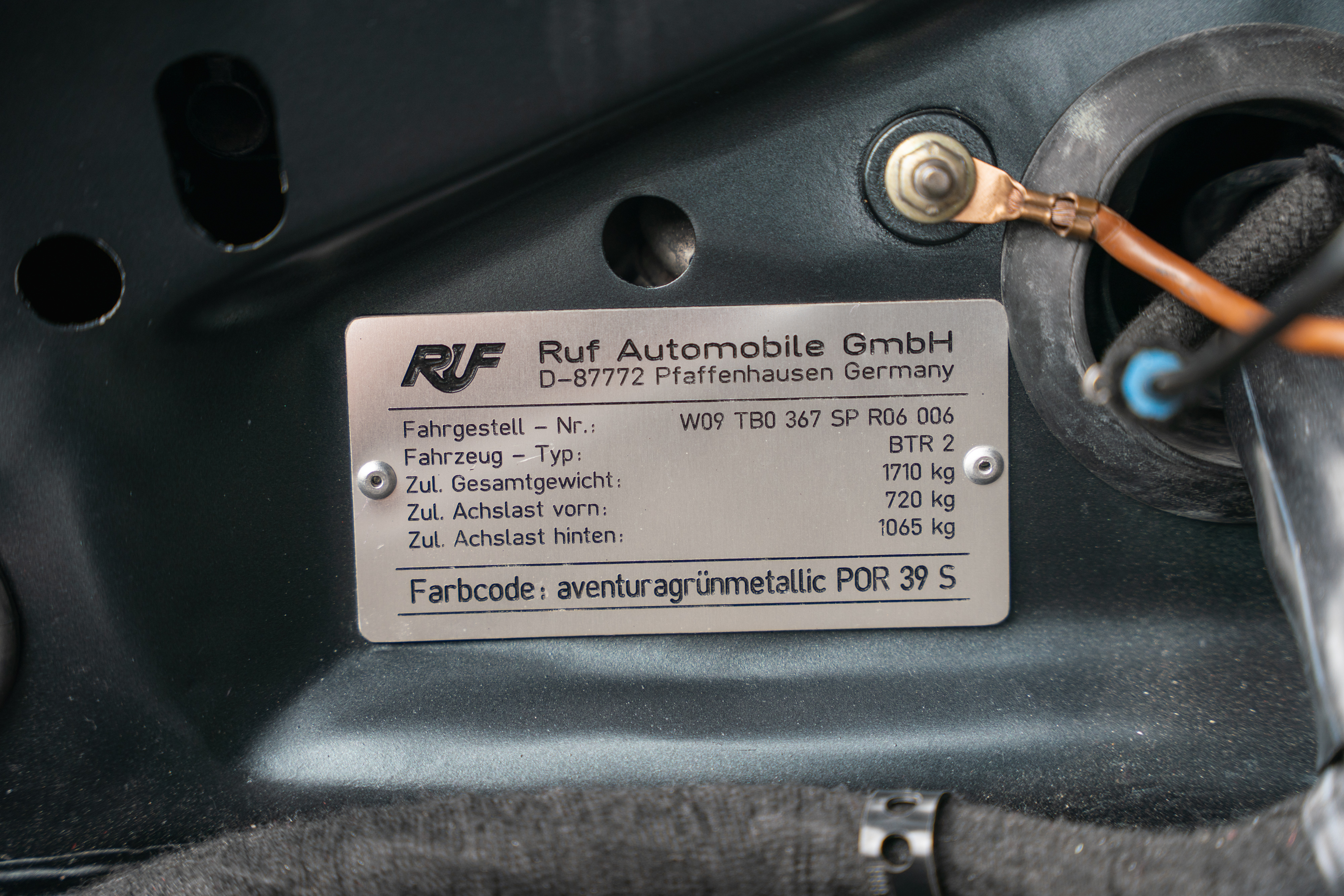
Ruf plaque on a 1995 BTR2

The BTR2 is powered by a 3.6 L flat-six engine based on the unit in the 993 Carrera but upgraded with a single turbocharger running 11.6 psi of boost pressure, intercooler, modified camshafts, an auxiliary oil-cooler, a new exhaust system, lowered compression ratio (from 11.3:1 to 8.4:1) and a Bosch Motronic engine management system. These upgrades allowed the engine to generate 420 PS (309 kW; 414 hp) at 5,000 rpm and 435 lb⋅ft (590 N⋅m) of torque at 4,800 rpm. Other mechanical changes included a RUF 6-speed manual transmission, 30 mm lowered suspension, stiffer anti roll bars, limited-slip differential with 60 percent lockup and bigger brakes (320 mm front and 300 mm rear). The also featured 18 inch Ruf 5-spoke alloy wheels, special bucket seats, restyled bumpers and a fixed "whale tail" rear wing reminiscent to the one found on the Porsche 964 Turbo. The car could accelerate from 0–62 mph (0–100 km/h) in 4.1 seconds and could attain a top speed of 191 mph (308 km/h). Automobile magazine Car & Driver tested a BTR2 and found the car capable of accelerating from 0–60 mph (97 km/h) in 3.7 seconds, 0–150 mph (241 km/h) in 26.2 seconds and completing the quarter-mile in 12.2 seconds at 115 mph (185 km/h).
