= Ruf RTurbo =

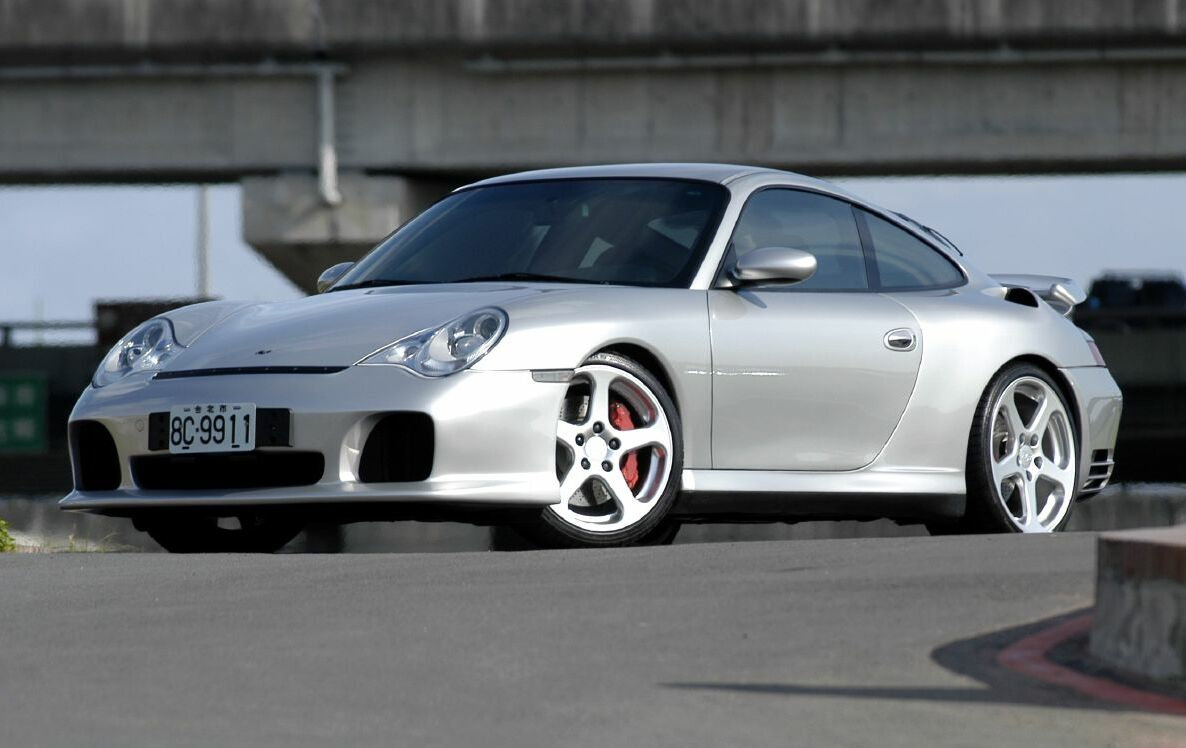

Overview
- Manufacturer: Ruf Automobile
- Production: 2001–2005

Body and chassis
- Class: Sports car (S)
- Body style: 2-door coupé; 2-door convertible
- Layout: Rear engine, rear wheel drive / all wheel drive
- Platform: Porsche 996

Powertrain
- Engine: 3.6L twin turbocharged flat-six
- Transmission: 6-speed Getrag G96/00 manual; 5-speed Tiptronic S automatic

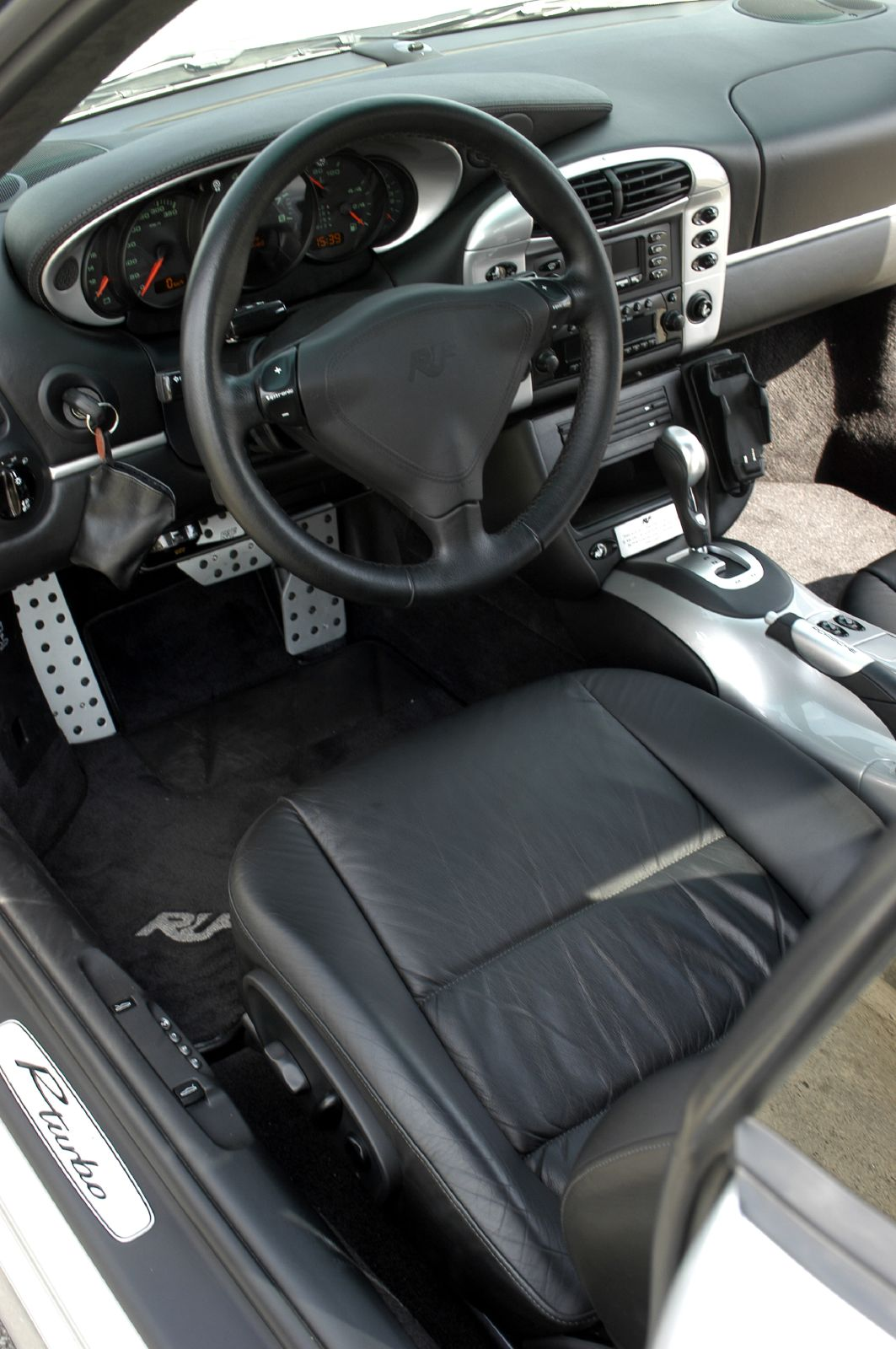
Interior of the RTurbo

The Ruf RTurbo is a sports car built by Ruf Automobile of Germany and introduced in 2001. It is based on the 996 generation Porsche 911. It was offered with a choice of 520 hp (388 kW), 550 hp (410 kW), and 590 hp (440 kW) engines. The RTurbo could be had as either a complete Ruf car with unique VIN or a conversion for an existing 996 retaining the original Porsche VIN.

== Specifications ==
The RTurbo is based on the 996 generation Porsche 911 and could be ordered as a coupe or cabriolet, with either a widebody Turbo bodyshell or an optional narrow body Carrera bodyshell and with a choice between all-wheel-drive and optional rear-wheel-drive.

Exterior upgrades include a choice of Ruf modular 18 inch or aluminum alloy 19 inch wheels, redesigned front and rear bumpers and quad exhaust tips. On the interior, the RTurbo has lightweight racing seats, revised gauges and a special sports steering wheel, with optional extras including an integrated roll cage, a traditional Ruf green leather interior or a leather interior in a colour chosen by the customer.

The base RTurbo, which is the widebody model with 520 hp, a 6-speed manual transmission, a 5-speed automatic transmission and all-wheel-drive, was priced at 189,300 euros, with the narrow body version costing an additional 20,600 euros.

== Performance ==
The RTurbo is available in 520, 550 and 590 hp variants. All variants are powered by a tuned version of the 3.6 litre flat-6 engine from the 996 911 Turbo. The engine is tuned by Ruf with modified KKK turbochargers, a remapped engine computer, Porsche GT3 engine mounts, upgraded valve train, a modified VarioCam system and an exhaust system with a bypass valve. For the optional 590 hp package, the engine also receives titanium connecting rods, upgraded camshafts and a heat exchanger to handle the power. The drivetrain consists of a Porsche GT2 transaxle, a stronger upgraded clutch, a limited slip differential and optional 4-wheel drive. The suspension is upgraded with new shocks, springs, stabiliser bars, and RUF-Brembo brake discs and calipers.

The base model is rated at 520 hp (388 kW) at 6,000 rpm and 546 lb⋅ft (740 N⋅m) of torque at 3,500 rpm, can accelerate from 0–97 km/h (60 mph) in 3.7 seconds, and, according to Ruf, can reach a top speed of between 330–344 km/h (205–214 mph) depending on gearing. The higher specification model is rated at 550 hp (410 kW) and 575 lb⋅ft (780 N⋅m) of torque and can, according to Ruf, reach a top speed of 351 km/h (218 mph).
