= UQM Technologies =

UQM Technologies Inc
- Industry: Manufacturing
- Founded: 1967
- Defunct: July 31, 2019
- Fate: Acquired by Danfoss
- Headquarters: Longmont, Colorado, U.S.
- Products: Motor engines

UQM Technologies Inc was an American manufacturer of electrical motors, generators, motor controllers, fuel cell compressor systems and hybrid systems for passenger and commercial vehicles. Established in 1967 as Unique Mobility Inc, UQM was based in Longmont, Colorado. UQM's products were sold direct to original equipment manufacturers (OEM).

== History ==
The company was involved in the late 1970s Unique Mobility Electrek vehicle, a 2-door 2+2 seater made of fibreglass-reinforced plastic and powered by 16 six-volt batteries. The Electrek featured regenerative braking and could reach a claimed maximum speed of 75 mph and an urban driving range of 75 miles.

Given its contribution to the application of hybrid electric propulsion to small military boats, UQM received a $70,000 Phase I contract which was awarded by the Office of Naval Research from the U.S. Navy, in 2003.

UQM provided PowerPhase propulsion systems for Zenith Motors shuttles, RegenNautics marine applications, Hino Motors electric city buses and Proterra electric composite buses, among others and has been used by several concept cars such as the Audi A1 e-tron and Rolls-Royce 102EX Electric Phantom. The PowerPhase Pro system entered production in October 2011. The German company Ruf Automobile modified a Porsche 911 into an electric version called eRuf Model A, using UQM's 150kW PowerPhase motor.

In 2008, Boeing made aviation history by achieving the first crewed flight of a fuel-cell-powered aircraft which used a UQM motor.

In 2010, UQM received a visit from vice-president Joe Biden to promote the $45 million of Stimulus Act money the company received.

In 2019, the company was acquired by Danfoss, effective on July 31.
