= Ruf BTR =

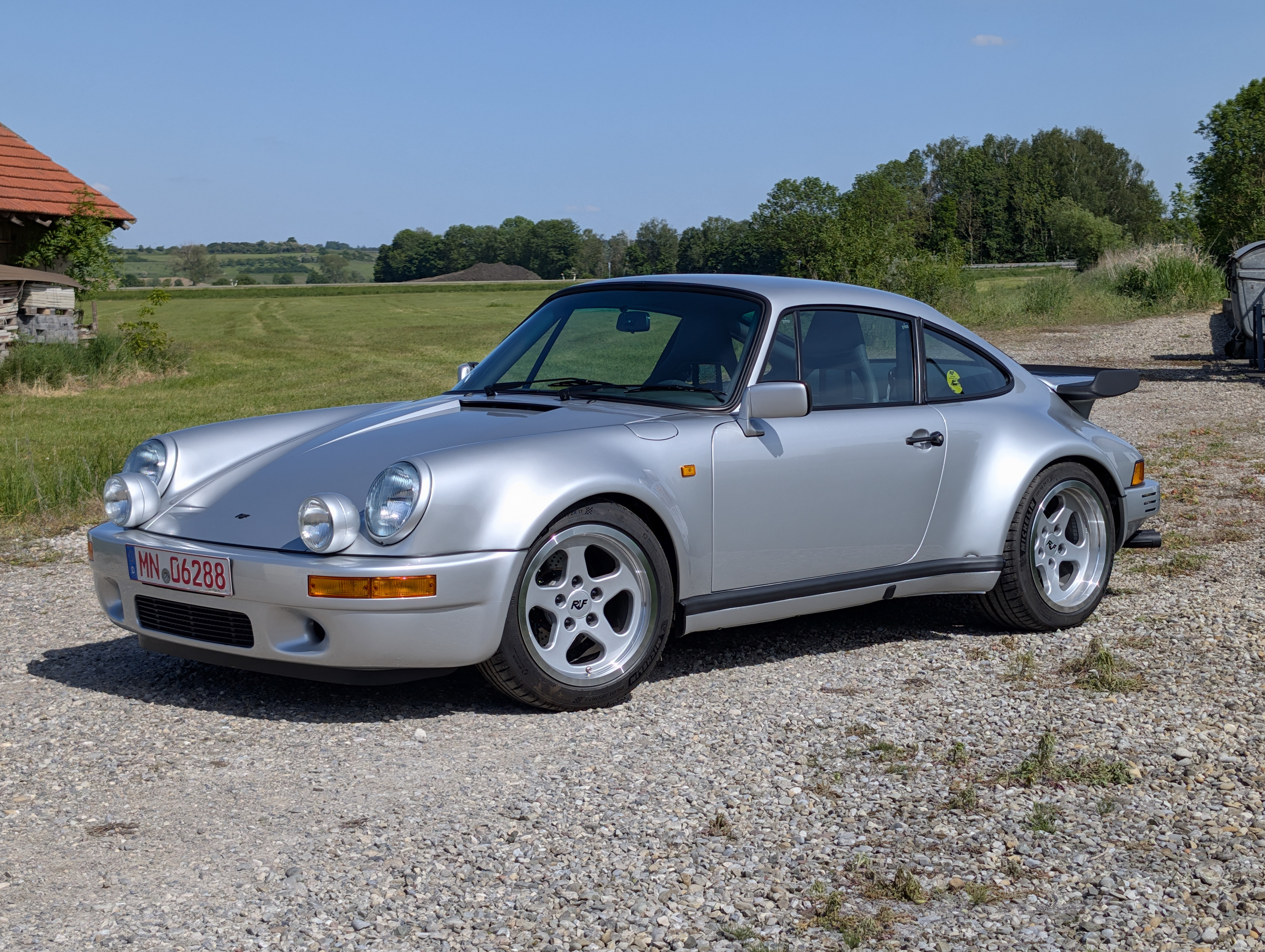

Overview
- Manufacturer: Ruf Automobile GmbH
- Production: 1983–1989 (about 20-30 built from Porsche "body in white" chassis, rest converted from customer cars)

Body and chassis
- Class: Sports car (S)
- Body style: 2-door coupé
- Layout: Rear-engine, rear-wheel drive
- Platform: Porsche 911
- Related: Porsche 930

Powertrain
- Engine: 3.4 L (3,367 cc) turbocharged flat-6
- Transmission: 5-speed manual

Dimensions
- Wheelbase: 2,272 mm (89.4 in)
- Length: 4,251–4,291 mm (167–169 in)
- Width: 1,652–1,775 mm (65–70 in)
- Height: 1,270–1,295 mm (50–51 in)
- Curb weight: 1,169–1,356 kilograms (2,577–2,990 lb)

Chronology
- Predecessor: Ruf SCR
- Successor: Ruf CTR; Ruf BTR 3.8; RUF BTR2

The Ruf BTR (Gruppe B Turbo RUF) is a sports car built by German automobile manufacturer Ruf Automobile. The BTR began production in 1983 and was based on the Porsche 911 (produced from 1978–1989) available in a narrow 911 or optional wide body configuration akin to the 930 Turbo (the drag difference causing more than 12.5 mph (20 km/h) difference in top speed). The BTR was the first Ruf production sports car with a company specific VIN.

Construction of each vehicle began at the bare chassis level. About 20–30 cars were built this way, probably even more were converted from customer cars, though no clear records exist to signify the total number of cars produced.

== Specifications ==
The BTR was powered by a 3.4-litre, flat-6 turbocharged engine, producing 374 PS (275 kW; 369 hp) at 6,000 rpm and 480 N⋅m (354 lbf⋅ft) of torque at 4,800 rpm. It came standard with a five-speed manual transmission, though a six-speed transmission became available in 1988 upon request. Other changes included bigger brakes and a stiffer suspension system.

Changes done to converted customer cars included a Ruf 5-speed manual transmission, quad-pipe exhaust system, Recaro leather seats, Ruf instrument clusters and steering wheel, Simpson race harness, twin-plug conversion applied to the engine, engine capacity increased to 3.4-litres with modifications done to the turbocharger, a front spoiler with an oil cooler, optional Porsche 935 style wing mirrors and Ruf 5-spoke 17-inch alloy wheels. The BTR conversion was available either for the 930 Turbo or for a Carrera 3.2.

== Performance ==
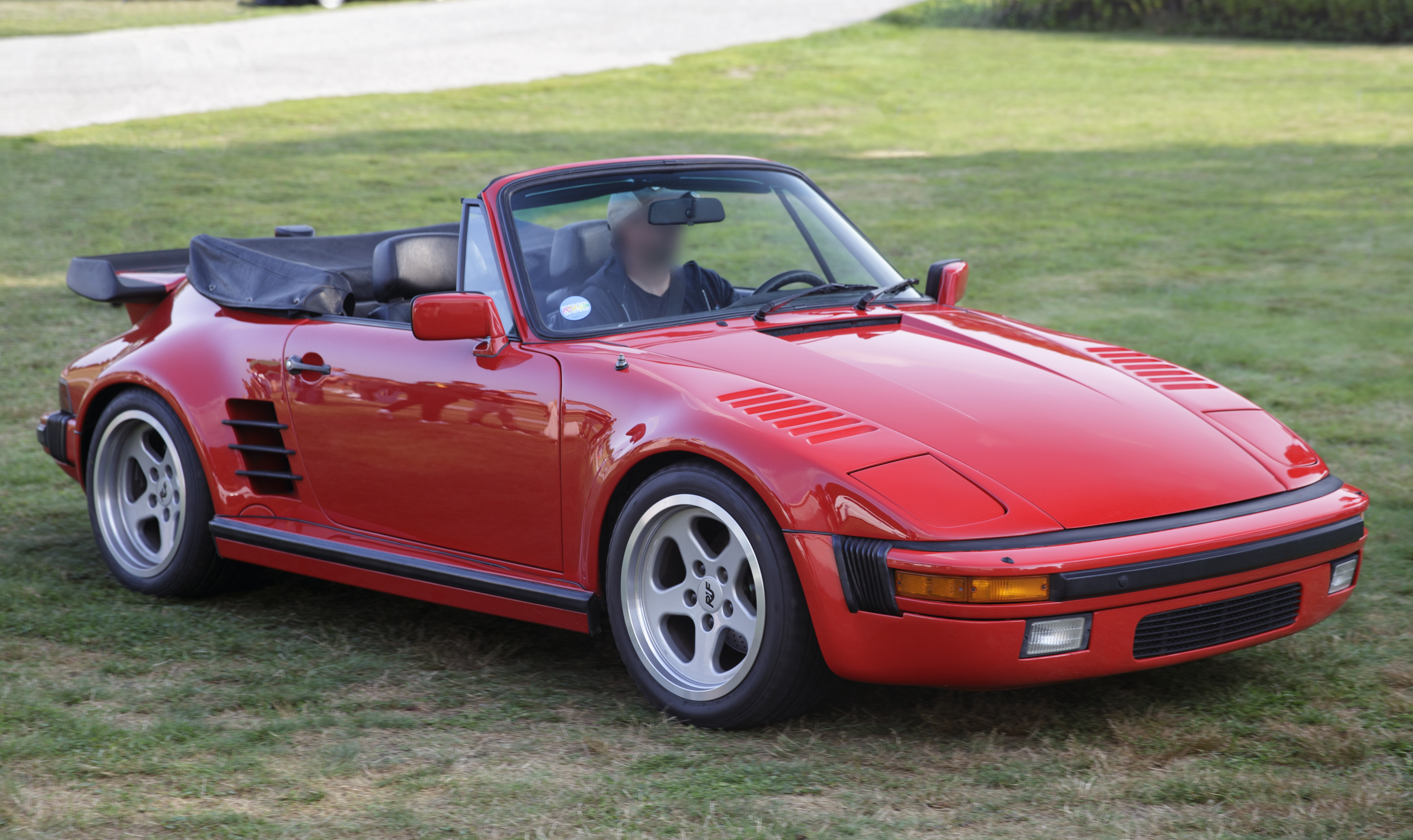
Two convertible BTRs were also built.

Test results with narrow 911 body (by Car & Driver):

- 0–48 km/h (30 mph): 1.6 seconds
- 0–97 km/h (60 mph): 4.3 seconds
- 0–161 km/h (100 mph): 9.6 seconds
- 0–209 km/h (130 mph): 16.9 seconds
- 0–241 km/h (150 mph): 24.3 seconds
- 1/4 mile (402m): 12.5 seconds at 180 km/h (112 mph)
- Top speed: 305 km/h (190 mph) (tested by Auto, Motor und Sport)

== Awards and recognition ==
In 1984, a Ruf BTR won the "World's Fastest Cars" contest held by the American car magazine Road & Track with a 10 mph (16 km/h) lead and also dominated the acceleration tests. It accelerated from 0–97 km/h (0–60 mph) in 4.7 seconds, 0–161 km/h (0–100 mph) in 10.4 seconds, covered the 1/4 mile (402 m) in 13.3 seconds at a speed of 177 km/h (110 mph), and managed a top speed of 300 km/h (186.2 mph).

At the next contest three years later, the same car, with 211,000 trouble-free miles on the odometer, visited outside the competition and attained a top speed of 301 km/h (187 mph), still able to outperform most of the newer cars including the Lamborghini Countach 5000 QV, the AMG Hammer, the Ferrari 288 GTO, the Ferrari Testarossa and the Isdera Imperator 108i. Only the Porsche 959, the Ruf CTR and a Koenig-modified Porsche 911 Turbo with engine by RS-Tuning were faster.

In Auto, Motor und Sport 22/1984 issue, a Ruf BTR set a new 0–100 km/h acceleration record for production cars tested by the magazine. It accelerated from 0–100 km/h (0–62 mph) in 4.6 seconds, 0–200 km/h (0–124 mph) in 15.5 seconds and covered a standing kilometre in 23.0 seconds.

== Later Models ==
=== BTR 3.8 ===
Introduced in 1993, the BTR 3.8 was based on the rear-wheel-drive 964 Carrera 2 and changes included an enlarged engine capacity of 3.8-litres, a turbocharger, a 6-speed automatic transmission with an electronic clutch, a completely reworked suspension and brakes, special 18-inch Ruf 5-spoke wheels and larger tyres measuring 235/40 ZR at the front and 265/35 ZR at the rear. The modifications done to the engine resulted in a power output of 415 PS (305 kW; 409 hp).

The car had a spartan, driver focused interior and featured lightweight racing bucket seats. Performance figures included acceleration to 97 km/h (60 mph) in 3.6 seconds, acceleration to 200 km/h (124 mph) in 12.9 seconds and a top speed of 320.36 km/h (199.06 mph) making it one of the fastest cars in the world at the time of its introduction.

=== BTR2 ===
Introduced in 1993, the Ruf BTR2 was based on the Porsche 993. Using the 993 Carrera as a donor car, the BTR2 had a single turbocharger setup (with 11.6 psi of boost pressure), just like the original BTR. Changes done to the engine included an air-to-air intercooler, an auxiliary oil-cooler, Bosch Motronic engine management system and a lower compression ratio. The engine generated a maximum power output of 420 PS (310 kW) at 5,000 rpm and 435 lb⋅ft (590 N⋅m) of torque at 4,800 rpm.

The car included a Ruf 6-speed manual transmission, limited slip differential (with 60% lockup), lowered suspension (30mm reduction), bigger brake discs and stiff anti-rollbars as standard equipment. Other changes included Ruf 5-spoke alloy wheels, racing bucket seats in the interior, different front and rear bumpers and a "whale-tail" rear wing.

Performance figures included acceleration to 97 km/h (60 mph) in 4.1 seconds and a top speed of 308 km/h (191 mph).
