= Ruf Automobile =

German automobile manufacturer

Ruf Automobile GmbH

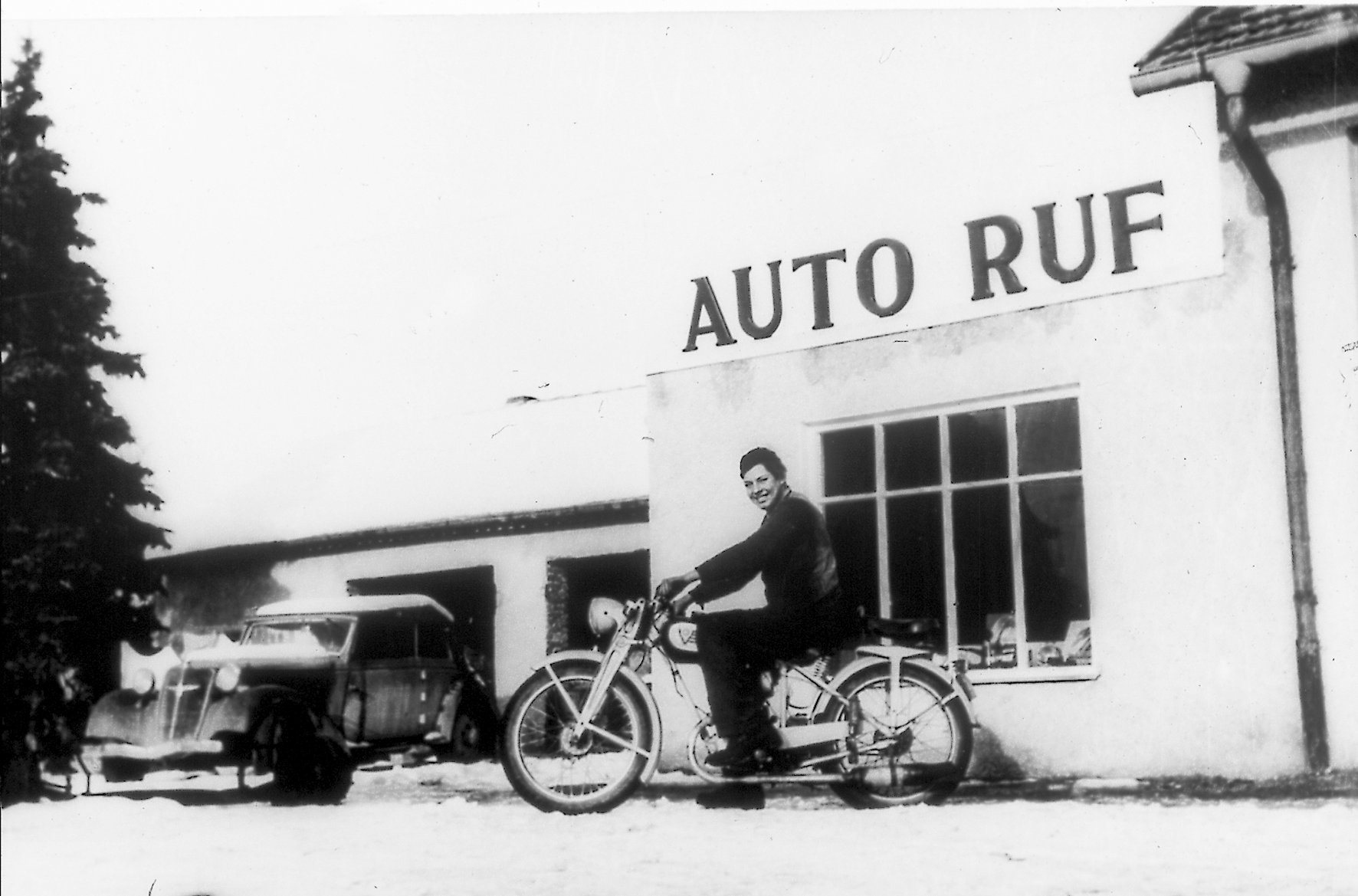
- Type: Private (GmbH & Co. KG)
- Industry: Automotive
- Founded: 1939
- Founder: Alois Ruf Sr.
- Headquarters: Pfaffenhausen, Germany
- Key people: Alois Ruf Jr. (Chairman)
- Products: Automobiles; Automotive parts
- Website: www.ruf-automobile.de

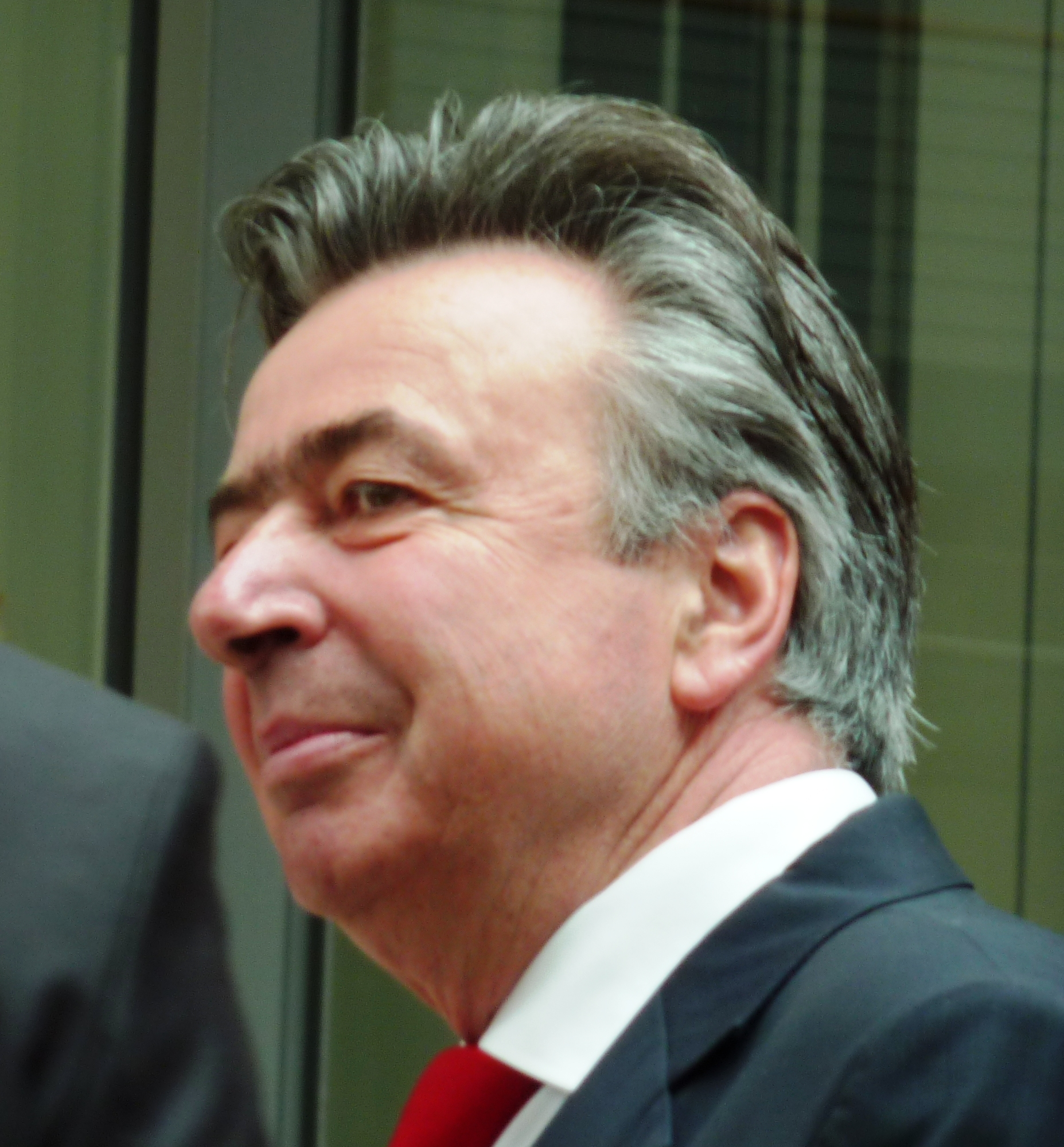
Alois Ruf Jr. (2010)

Ruf Automobile GmbH (stylized as RUF) is a German car manufacturer. Formerly using Porsche bodies in white to build cars, today they build vehicles on their own bodies and chassis. They also manufacture performance parts for various Porsche models, including the 911, Boxster, and Cayman.

The company rose to fame when in 1987, its Porsche-derived CTR reached 339 km/h (211 mph), surpassing the Ferrari F40's claimed top speed of 321 km/h (199 mph).

== History ==
The company was founded in 1939 in Pfaffenhausen, Germany as "Auto Ruf" by Alois Ruf Sr. as a service garage and was eventually expanded to include a full-service gas station in 1949. Ruf began experimenting with vehicle designs of his own in the late 1940s, and in 1955 designed and built a tour bus, which he marketed around Germany. The positive response it received led to Ruf expanding his business again by starting his own separately owned bus company.

Alois Sr.'s involvement in the car industry had a distinct effect on his son, Alois Ruf Jr., who became a sports car enthusiast. In 1960, Alois Jr. began servicing and restoring Porsche automobiles out of his father's garage. Following Alois Sr's. death in 1974, 24-year-old Alois Jr. took control of the business and focused on his passion: Porsche vehicles, and especially the 911. A year later in 1975, the first Ruf-enhanced Porsche came to life.

Ruf debuted their first complete model in 1977, a tuned version of Porsche's 911 Turbo with a stroked, 3.3-litre motor. This was followed in 1978 by Ruf's first complete non-turbo Porsche, the 911 SCR. It was a naturally aspirated 911 with a stroked 3.2-litre motor producing 217 horsepower. Numerous customer orders were placed for this vehicle.

In 1987, Ruf released the Ruf CTR, which achieved a top speed of 339 km/h (211 mph) in April 1987 and set the record as the world's fastest production car for its time; in 1988 it even reached 342 km/h (213 mph). Its successor, the 1995 Ruf CTR2, had clocked a top speed of 350 km/h (217 mph), making it for a brief moment the fastest road-legal production car in the world in the mid '90s, until the McLaren F1 broke the record in 1998 at 241 mph, thus making the CTR2 the second-fastest production car of the decade. However, the CTR2 cost only a fraction of the price of the F1.

In April 2007, Ruf released the new CTR3 to celebrate the company's new plant in Bahrain, and as a 20th anniversary celebration of the original CTR and successor to the CTR2. The Ruf CTR3 was designed and engineered in a partnership with the Canadian engineering firm Multimatic. The Ruf CTR3 was Ruf's first entirely unique model, built using their own chassis and body. The CTR3 differs from typical Ruf models in that it uses a Mid-engine design, as opposed to the 911's Rear-engine design. Automotive journalists have compared it to the Porsche 911 GT1, which similarly used a mid-engine layout with a body designed to resemble the Porsche 911.

In 2017, Ruf unveiled the Ruf CTR Anniversary at the Geneva Motor Show, 30 years after the launch of the original Ruf CTR. The CTR Anniversary is Ruf's second model to use their own body and chassis design, which was designed and engineered in partnership with German engineering firm Vela Performance. The Ruf CTR Anniversary retains the Porsche 911's rear-engine layout, but does not use any major Porsche components. The only original Porsche parts are windows and windscreen wipers borrowed from the 964 and 993. The CTR Anniversary uses a 3.6-litre water cooled twin-turbocharged flat-6 engine producing 700 hp (710 PS; 522 kW), and a custom 7-speed transmission built to Ruf's specification by ZF, and is unrelated to any Porsche transmissions.

In 2018, Ruf unveiled the new Ruf SCR. The SCR uses the same in-house body and chassis design from the Ruf CTR Anniversary, although with a normally aspirated engine producing 510 PS (503 hp; 375 kW). The 2018 Ruf SCR borrows its name from the 1978 Ruf SCR.

== Ruf models ==
=== Current models ===
- CTR3 Evo
- CTR Anniversary
- SCR 2018
- Rodeo
- R Spyder

=== Past models ===
| Model | Duration of production | Based on | Engine | Top speed | Image |
|---|---|---|---|---|---|
| Turbo 3.3 | 1975–1989 | Porsche 930 | 3.3L turbocharged flat-6 303 PS (223 kW; 299 bhp); 412 N⋅m (304 lb⋅ft) | 262.8 km/h (163.3 mph) | (On the left) |
| SCR 3.2 | 1978–1981 | Porsche 911SC | 3.2L naturally aspirated flat-6 215 PS (158 kW; 212 bhp); 280 N⋅m (207 lb⋅ft) | 255 km/h (158 mph) | |
| BTR | 1983–1989 | Porsche 930 | 3.4L turbocharged flat-6 375 PS (276 kW; 370 bhp); 480 N⋅m (354 lb⋅ft) BTR III with Motronic:408 PS (300 kW; 402 bhp); 480 N⋅m (354 lb⋅ft) | 305 km/h (190 mph) | |
| CTR "Yellowbird" | 1987–1996 | Porsche 911 Carrera 3.2 | 3.4L twin-turbocharged flat-6 469 PS (345 kW; 463 bhp); 553 N⋅m (408 lb⋅ft) | 342 km/h (213 mph) | |
| BR2 | 1991–1992 | Porsche 964 Carrera | 3.3L turbocharged flat-6 360 PS (265 kW; 355 bhp); 465 N⋅m (343 lb⋅ft) | 303 km/h (188 mph) | |
| CR2 | 1991 | Porsche 964 Carrera 2 | 3.6L naturally aspirated flat-6 290 PS (213 kW; 286 bhp) | - | |
| CR4 | 1991 | Porsche 964 Carrera 4 | 3.6L naturally aspirated flat-6 290 PS (213 kW; 286 bhp) | - | |
| RCT | 1993 | Porsche 964 | 3.6L turbocharged flat-6 370 PS (272 kW; 365 bhp) | 305 km/h (190 mph) | |
| BTR2 | 1993–1998 | Porsche 993 | 3.6L turbocharged flat-6 420 PS (309 kW; 414 bhp); 590 N⋅m (435 lb⋅ft) | 308 km/h (191 mph) | |
| CTR2 | 1996–1997 | Porsche 993 | 3.6L twin-turbocharged flat-6 "base model": 520 PS (382 kW; 513 bhp); 685 N⋅m (505 lb⋅ft) SPORT: 580 PS (427 kW; 572 bhp); 780 N⋅m (575 lb⋅ft) | 350 km/h (220 mph) | |
| Turbo R | 1998 | Porsche 993 | 3.6L twin-turbocharged flat-6 496 PS (365 kW; 490 hp); 650 N⋅m (479 lbf⋅ft) | 329 km/h (204 mph) | |
| 3400S | 1999–2002 | Porsche 986 (Boxster) | 3.4L naturally aspirated flat-6 310 PS (228 kW; 306 bhp); 360 N⋅m (266 lb⋅ft) | 278 km/h (173 mph) | |
| RGT | 2000–2004 | Porsche 996 | 3.6L naturally aspirated flat-6 "base model": 385 PS (283 kW; 380 bhp) RS: 395 PS (291 kW; 390 bhp) | 307 km/h (191 mph) | |
| RTurbo | 2001–2005 | Porsche 996 | 3.6L twin-turbocharged flat-6 variant 1: 520 PS (382 kW; 513 bhp); 740 N⋅m (546 lb⋅ft) variant 2: 550 PS (405 kW; 542 bhp); 780 N⋅m (575 lb⋅ft) | 350 km/h (220 mph) | |
| 3600S | 2002–2005 | Porsche 986 (Boxster) | 3.6L naturally aspirated flat-6 325 PS (239 kW; 321 bhp); 370 N⋅m (273 lb⋅ft) | 278 km/h (173 mph) | |
| Rt 12 | 2004–2012 | Porsche 997 | 3.6L twin-turbocharged flat-6 variant 1: 530 PS (390 kW; 523 bhp) variant 2: 560 PS (412 kW; 552 bhp) 3.8L twin-turbocharged flat-6 variant 1 ("S" variant): 685 PS (504 kW; 676 bhp) variant 2 ("R" variant): 737 PS (542 kW; 727 bhp) | over 350 km/h (220 mph) | |
| RGT | 2005–2011 | Porsche 997 | 3.8L naturally aspirated flat-6 451 PS (332 kW; 445 bhp); 420 N⋅m (310 lb⋅ft) | - | |
| RK Spyder | 2005–2008 | Porsche 987 (Boxster) | 3.8L supercharged flat-6 440 PS (324 kW; 434 bhp); 470 N⋅m (347 lb⋅ft) | over 300 km/h (190 mph) | |
| RK Coupé | 2006–2007 | Porsche 987c (Cayman) | 3.8L supercharged flat-6 440 PS (324 kW; 434 bhp); 470 N⋅m (347 lb⋅ft) | over 300 km/h (190 mph) | |
| R Kompressor | 2006–2009 | Porsche 997 | 3.6L supercharged flat-6 435 PS (320 kW; 429 bhp); 470 N⋅m (347 lb⋅ft) 3.8L supercharged flat-6 460 PS (338 kW; 454 bhp) | - | |
| CTR3 | 2007–2012 | Ruf-designed body | 3.7L twin-turbocharged flat-6 691 PS (508 kW; 682 bhp); 890 N⋅m (656 lb⋅ft) | 375 km/h (233 mph) | |
| 3400 K | 2007–2012 | Porsche 987c (Cayman) | 3.4L supercharged flat-6 400 PS (294 kW; 395 bhp); 440 N⋅m (325 lb⋅ft) | - | |
| Rt 12S | 2009–2013 | Porsche 997 | 3.8L twin-turbocharged flat-6 approximated from 3746 cm³ 685 PS (504 kW; 676 bhp); 880 N⋅m (649 lb⋅ft) | - | |
| Dakara | 2009 | Porsche 955 (Cayenne) | 4.5L twin-turbocharged V8; 600 PS (441 kW; 592 bhp); 890 N⋅m (656 lb⋅ft) | - | |
| RGT-8 | 2010 | Porsche 997 | 4.5L naturally aspirated V8; 550 PS (405 kW; 542 bhp); 500 N⋅m (369 lb⋅ft) | 317 km/h (197 mph) | |
| Rt 12R | 2011–2012 | Porsche 997 | 3.8L twin-turbocharged flat-6 730 PS (537 kW; 720 bhp); 940 N⋅m (693 lb⋅ft) | - | |
| RGT-8 | 2012 | Porsche 991 | 4.5L naturally aspirated V8; 550 PS (405 kW; 542 bhp); 500 N⋅m (369 lb⋅ft) | 318 km/h (198 mph) | |
| Rt 35 | 2012–2013 | Porsche 991 | 3.8L twin-turbocharged flat-6 630 PS (463 kW; 621 bhp); 825 N⋅m (608 lb⋅ft) | - | |
| Rt 35 S | 2013–2019 | Porsche 991 | 3.8L twin-turbocharged flat-6 650 PS (478 kW; 641 bhp); 840 N⋅m (620 lb⋅ft) | - | |
| Rt 35 Roadster | 2013–2019 | Porsche 991 | 3.8L twin-turbocharged flat-6 630 PS (463 kW; 621 bhp); 825 N⋅m (608 lb⋅ft) | - | |
| 3800S | 2013–2017 | Porsche 981 (Boxster); Porsche 981 (Cayman) | 3.8L naturally aspirated flat-6 420 PS (309 kW; 414 bhp); 450 N⋅m (332 lb⋅ft) | 303 km/h (188 mph) | |
| RGT 4.2 | 2015–2016 | Porsche 997 GT3 RS 4.0 | 4.2L naturally aspirated flat-6 525 PS (386 kW; 518 bhp); 500 N⋅m (369 lb⋅ft) | 322 km/h (200 mph) | |
| RtR | 2015–2017 | Porsche 991 | 3.8L twin-turbocharged flat-6 variant 1: 645 PS (474 kW; 636 bhp) variant 2: 802 PS (590 kW; 791 bhp); 990 N⋅m (730 lb⋅ft) | 350 km/h (220 mph) | |
| Turbo R Limited | 2016 | Porsche 993 | 3.6L twin-turbocharged flat-6 620 PS (456 kW; 612 bhp); 750 N⋅m (553 lb⋅ft) | 339 km/h (211 mph) | |
| SCR 4.2 | 2016 | Ruf-designed body | 4.2L naturally aspirated flat-6 525 PS (386 kW; 518 bhp); 500 N⋅m (369 lb⋅ft) | 322 km/h (200 mph) | |
| Ultimate | 2016 | Ruf-designed body | 3.6L twin-turbocharged flat-6 590 PS (434 kW; 582 bhp); 720 N⋅m (531 lb⋅ft) | 339 km/h (211 mph) | |

== eRuf electric vehicles ==
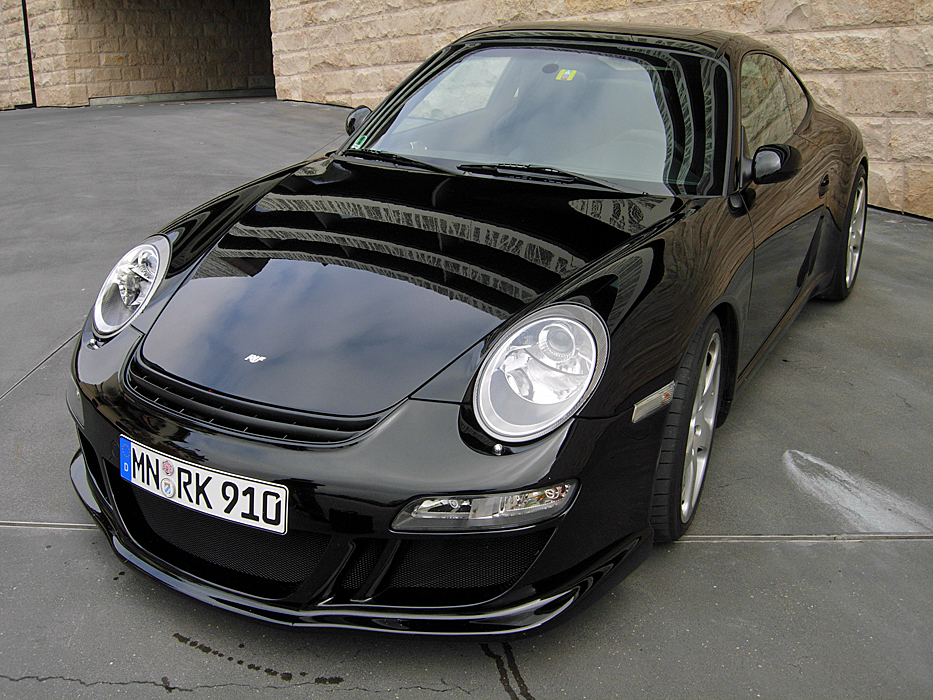
eRuf Model A

The eRuf Model A is an all-electric sports car made by Ruf Automobile. The car is powered by a UQM Technologies propulsion system (a UQM PowerPhase 150). The car has a top speed of 225 km/h (140 mph) and is capable of producing 150 kW (204 PS; 201 hp) and 649 N⋅m (479 lb⋅ft) of torque. Estimated range per charge is 250–320 km (155–199 mi), depending on performance level, using iron-phosphate, lithium-ion batteries built by Axeon of Great Britain. The power and torque produced by the 3-phase motor can be used to recover almost as much power as it can put out. During coasting the engine works as a generator producing electricity to charge the batteries. Ruf announced that it hoped to begin production of the eRuf in the autumn of 2009. This did not happen, and at the 2009 Geneva Motor Show, Ruf announced a new model, the eRUF Greenster, with limited production planned to commence at the end of 2010.

== In video games ==
Ruf models have historically appeared in many large racing video game franchises as a substitute for the Porsche models they are based on due to Porsche's exclusive licensing in video games. Starting with the release of Need for Speed: Porsche Unleashed in 2000, Porsche entered an exclusivity deal with Electronic Arts (EA) which meant that Porsche models would only appear in EA's titles, most notably the Need for Speed franchise and the Real Racing series.

The only exceptions to this were a number of games in the Forza and Project Gotham Racing series due to sub licensing arrangements made between EA and their games' respective developers, Turn 10 Studios and Bizarre Creations. Other large video game franchises, however, including Gran Turismo, Project CARS, Assetto Corsa, Asphalt, Test Drive, The Crew, Driver: San Francisco, Driveclub and more used Ruf models in place of Porsche. This circumvented Porsche's licensing as Ruf is considered by the German government to be a full-fledged manufacturer, and as such Ruf models have unique VINs.

The exclusivity deal between Porsche and EA ended in 2016, leading many franchises to stop featuring Ruf models in favor of Porsche. Though it has never been publicly confirmed, it has been speculated that Porsche and RUF can no longer co-exist in games due to interference from Porsche. For instance, in Asphalt 8: Airborne, RUFs and all other vehicles resembling Porsches became unobtainable for purchase in a Porsche-themed update, but users who had them before the update kept them, until an update in 2023 The Crew 2 features both brands, but neither competes against each other due to the game's car classification system.

However, Gran Turismo Sport, Gran Turismo 7, Gear.Club Unlimited 2 and other games feature both brands that can compete against each other at any time.
