= Ruf Dakara =

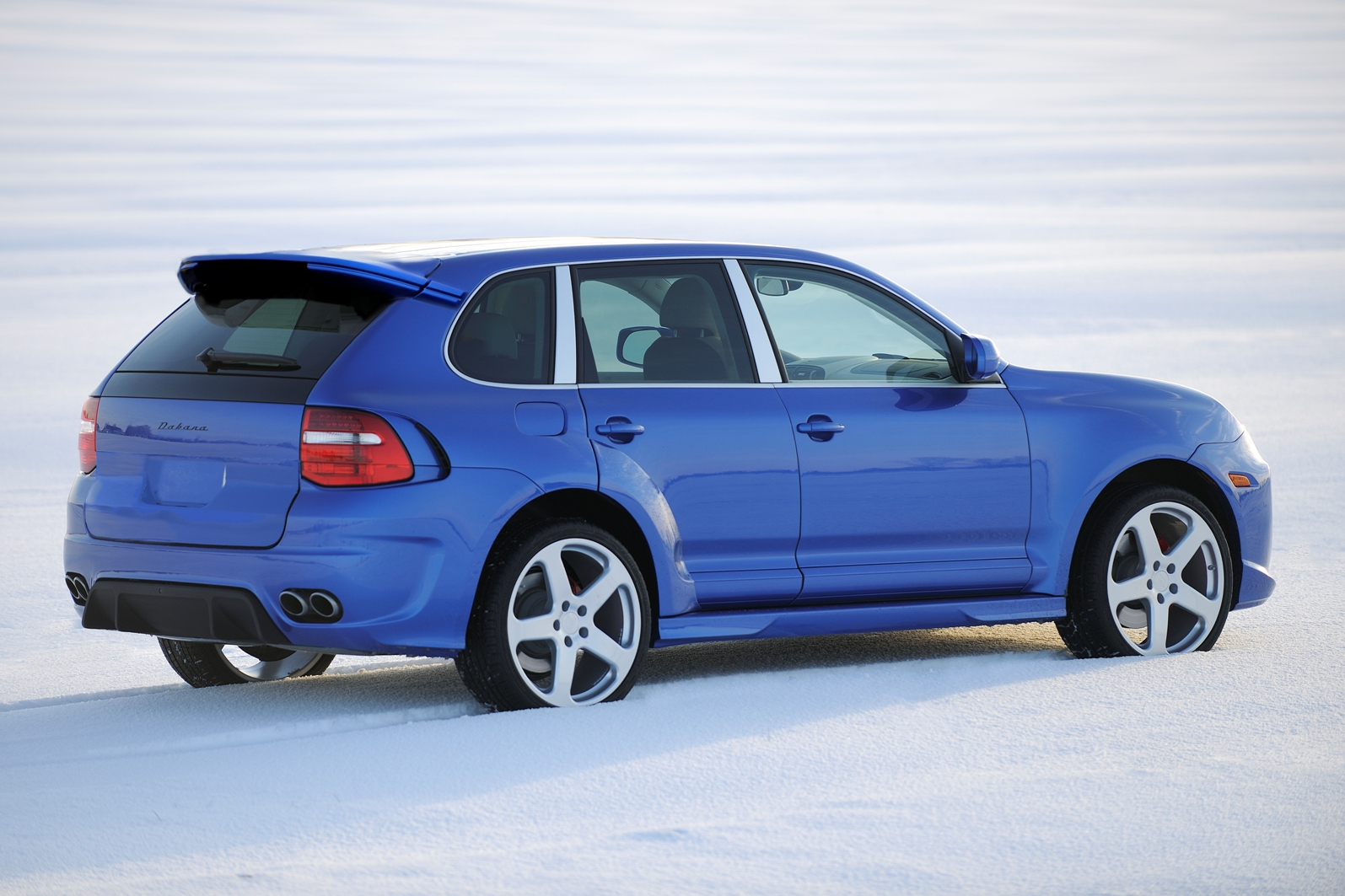
- Dakara rear end

Overview
- Manufacturer: Ruf Automobile
- Production: 2009

Body and chassis
- Body style: 5-door SUV
- Layout: Front-engine, four-wheel-drive
- Related: Porsche Cayenne Turbo S

Powertrain
- Engine: 4.8 L twin-turbo V8
- Power output: 591 hp (441 kW; 599 PS)
- Transmission: 6-speed automatic

The Ruf Dakara is a mid-size luxury crossover SUV based on the Porsche Cayenne and produced by German automobile manufacturer Ruf Automobile. The Dakara debuted at the Geneva Motor Show in 2009 with a base price of approximately $327,853 (€230,454).

== Specifications ==
The Dakara is powered by a modified version of the Cayenne Turbo S’ 4.8 L V8 engine that produces 600 PS (441 kW; 592 hp) at 6000 rpm and 890 N⋅m (656 lb⋅ft) of torque at 3000 rpm, up from 550 hp (410 kW; 558 PS) and 553 lb⋅ft (750 N⋅m) of torque in the stock Cayenne Turbo S. Ruf says this allows the Dakara to accelerate from 0–100 km/h (0–62 mph) in 4.8 seconds; the same as a stock Cayenne Turbo S. It also has re-tuned suspension and brakes, as well as optional ceramic composite brakes.

== Features ==
One of the most notable visual differences between the Dakara and the standard Cayenne is the headlamps, which are taken from a (911/997) model Porsche 911. On the exterior, it also features a Ruf body kit with a redesigned front end, widened fenders and 22-inch five-spoke alloy wheels. On the interior, the Dakara features redesigned leather seats, front and rear-facing cameras, an LED lighting package and a multimedia system that features TV and phone reception, internet access, CD and DVD compatibility, and an iPod interface.
