= Ruf CTR Anniversary =

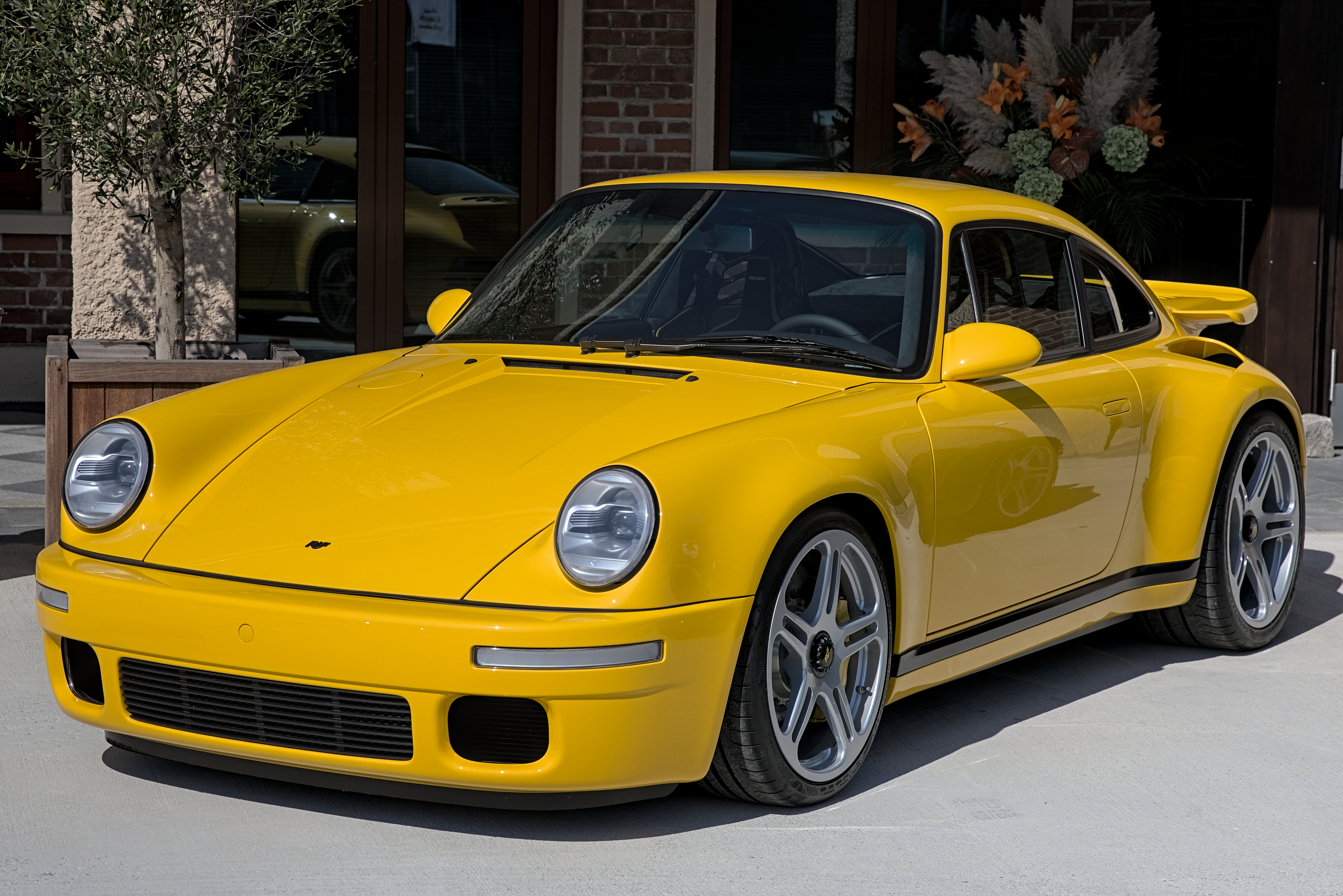

Overview
- Manufacturer: Ruf Automobile GmbH
- Production: 2019–present
- Assembly: Pfaffenhausen, Germany
- Designer: Freeman Thomas

Body and chassis
- Class: Sports car (S)
- Body style: 2-door coupé
- Layout: Longitudinally-mounted, rear-engine, rear-wheel-drive
- Related: Ruf SCR 2018; Porsche 911

Powertrain
- Engine: 3.6 L (3,600 cc) twin-turbocharged flat-6
- Power output: 700 hp (710 PS; 522 kW); 880 N⋅m (649 lb⋅ft) of torque
- Transmission: 7-speed manual

Dimensions
- Wheelbase: 2,342 mm (92.2 in)
- Length: 4,207 mm (165.6 in)
- Width: 1,819 mm (71.6 in)
- Height: 1,265 mm (49.8 in)
- Curb weight: 1,250 kg (2,756 lb)

Chronology
- Predecessor: Ruf CTR (spiritual)

The Ruf CTR Anniversary is a high performance sports car manufactured by German automobile manufacturer Ruf Automobile. The vehicle made its debut at the 87th Geneva Motor Show in March 2017, exactly 30 years after the original Ruf CTR was introduced, and is built to pay homage to that model.

== History ==
Although the CTR Anniversary is similar in appearance to the Porsche 911, it is not actually based on a 911 body. The CTR Anniversary's chassis and body were designed and engineered by Vela Performance, in Berlin, Germany. The car is assembled in the Ruf headquarters in Pfaffenhausen, Germany. A monocoque made of carbon fiber reinforced plastic with a screwed-on subframe made of tubular steel and light metal serves as the basis, while the body, which is styled after the Porsche 964, is made of a carbon fiber laminate. As a result, the dry weight of the vehicle is 1,200 kg (2,646 lb). The chassis consists of an in-house designed suspension using double wishbones and push rod actuated inboard springs & dampers. The new CTR is powered by a 3.6-litre water cooled twin-turbocharged flat-6 engine producing 700 hp (710 PS; 522 kW) at 6,750 rpm and 880 N⋅m (649 lb⋅ft) of torque from 2,750 to 4,000 rpm. The car is capable of accelerating from 0–100 km/h (62 mph) in under 3.5 seconds and can reach a top speed of 360 km/h (224 mph). Power is sent to the rear wheels through a 7-speed manual gearbox and locking differential. The car also sports retro components based on the original CTR such as the 'whale tail' rear wing five-spoke wheels, interior and the steering wheel. The CTR Anniversary is priced at €892,500 and only 50 examples are set to be produced. They have been produced in Pfaffenhausen since 2019.

== Gallery ==
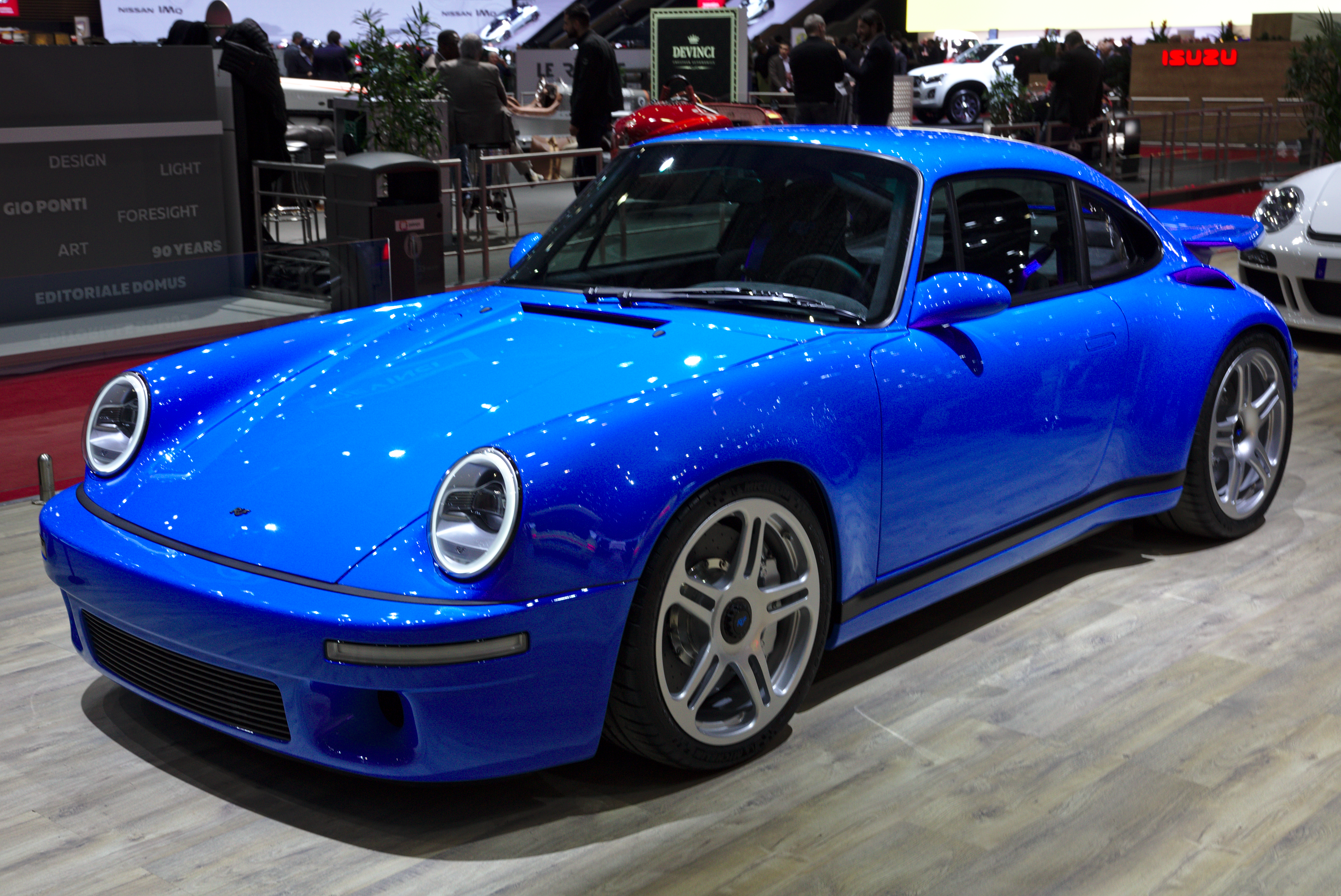
Ruf CTR Anniversary at the 2019 Geneva International Motor Show (front view)

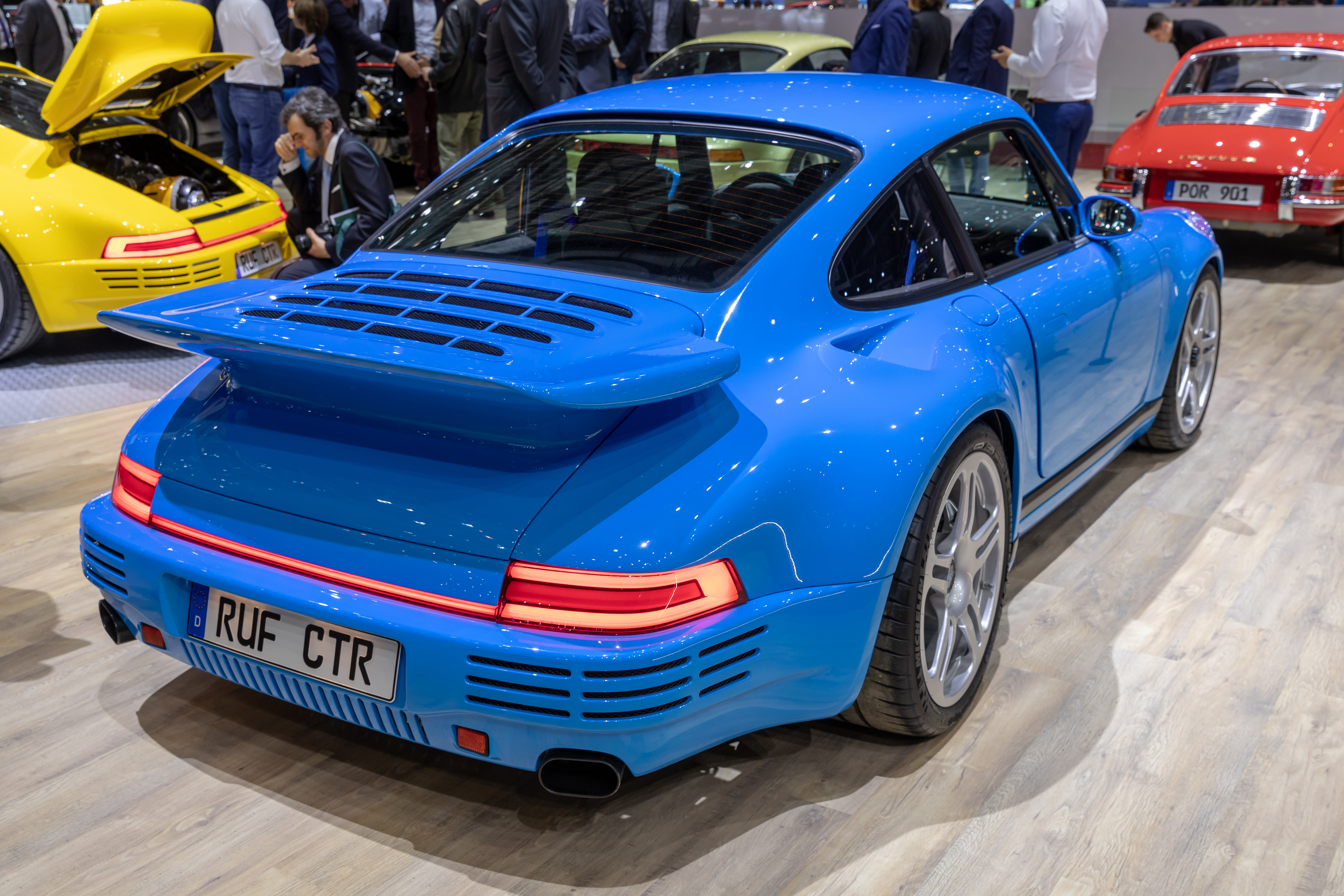
Rear view
