= Ruf RGT =

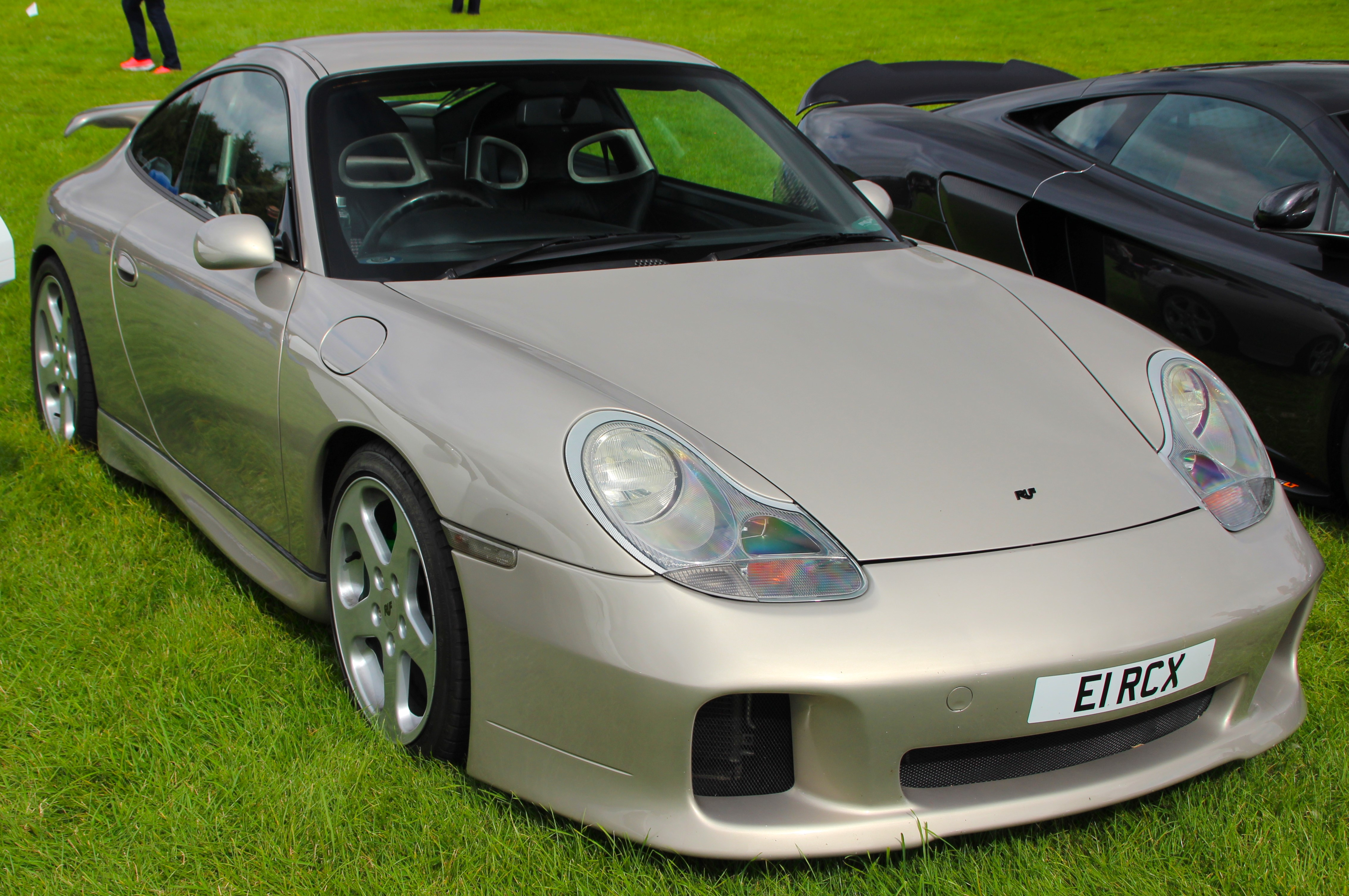
- Ruf RGT first generation

Overview
- Manufacturer: Ruf Automobile
- Production: 2000–present

Body and chassis
- Class: Sports car (S)
- Body style: 2-door coupé
- Layout: Rear-engine, rear-wheel-drive

Powertrain
- Engine: 3.6 L Porsche M96.05 H6; 3.8 L Porsche M97.01 H6; 4.5 L RUF designed V8
- Transmission: 6-speed manual

The Ruf RGT is a sports car made by Ruf Automobile of Germany.

== First generation (2000–2004) ==
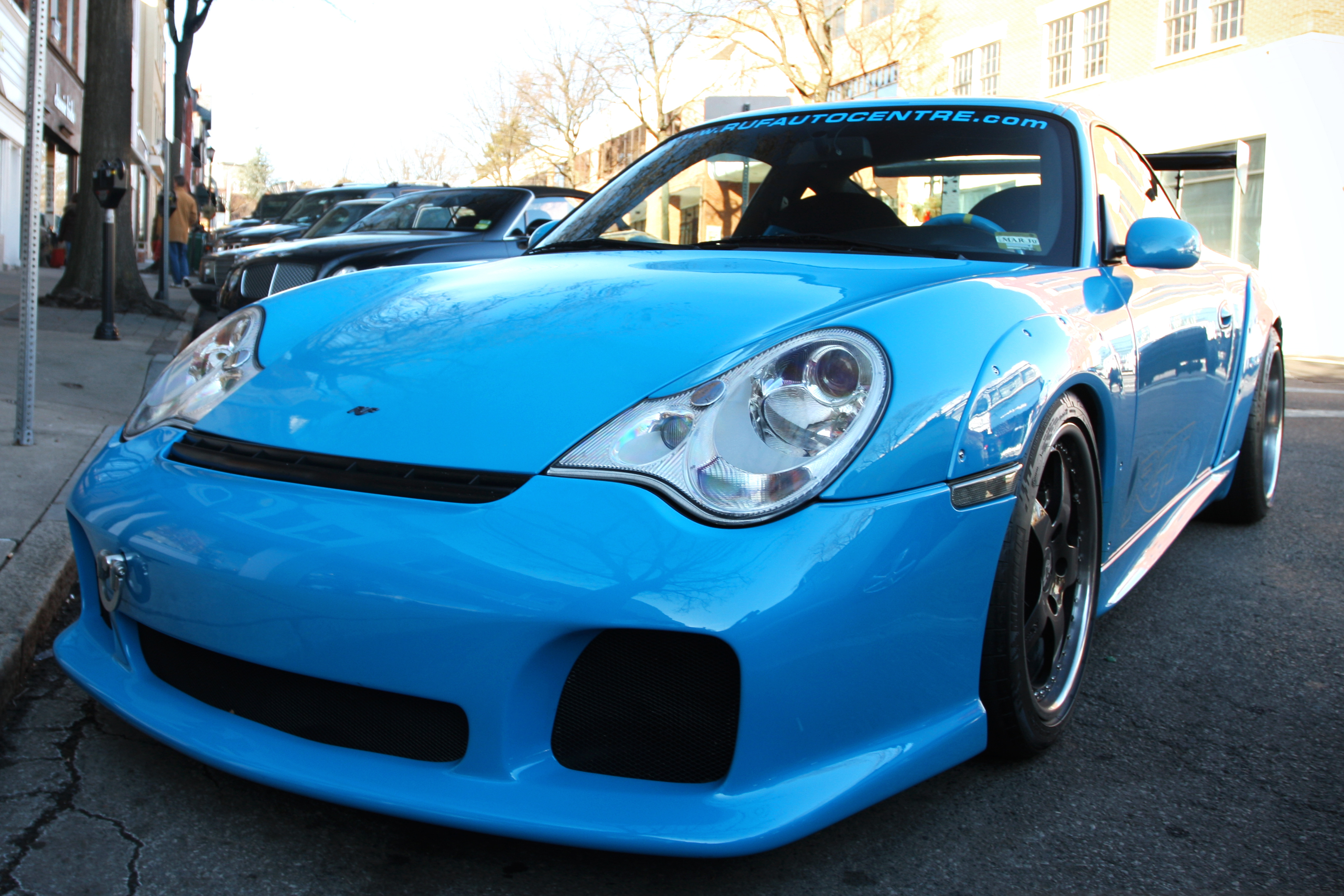
Ruf RGT (first generation)

The first-generation Ruf RGT was introduced in 2000 using an engine and chassis based on the Porsche 996. The original 3.6L version could accelerate from 0–60 mph (0–97 km/h) in 4.6 seconds, with a top speed of 190 mph (306 km/h).

== Second generation (2005–2011) ==
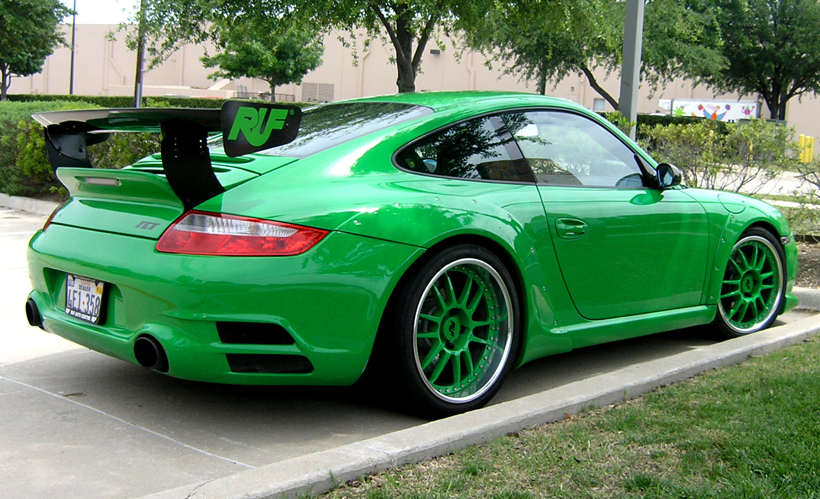
Ruf RGT (2007) rear

When the Porsche 997 debuted, Ruf bored out the 3.6 L engine to 3.8 litres (231.9 cu in), modified the exhaust and catalytic converters, and replaced the ECU and air filter. The new power output was 445 bhp (332 kW), reducing the 0–60 mph (0–97 km/h) time from 4.6 to 4.2 seconds (or even 4.1, according to some sources), and increasing top speed by 11 km/h (7 mph) to 317 km/h (197 mph).

Ruf also added a performance suspension system, using Bilstein components, as well as high-performance Brembo disc brakes, measuring 13.8 in (351 mm) in front and 13 in (330 mm) in the rear.

The car's appearance is also changed, using a bodykit that includes a polyurethane front air dam and carbon fibre doors, mirrors, engine lid, and spoiler, all of which reduce the car's weight to 2,932 lb (1,330 kg). The car is fitted with 19 inch Ruf-designed Superleggera wheels and Michelin Pilot Sport Cup tires. Finally, the RGT is customized with interior trim of the customer's choice, including Recaro seats and the deletion of unnecessary parts to save weight.

=== RGT-8 ===
In 2010, an updated version of the 997 RGT was unveiled at the Geneva Motor Show. The car was powered by a completely new, Ruf-designed 4.5-litre V8 engine with a 180° flat-plane crankshaft. Based on the architecture of BMW's S65 V8, the engine features four valves arranged spherically together with multipoint fuel injection which ensure optimal mixture conditions while the dry sump oil system supplies the necessary lubrication. Ruf made the RGT-8 as light as possible by installing aluminum doors, an aluminum hood, a carbon fibre engine cover, and a carbon fibre rear spoiler. Like the flat-6 versions, the RGT-8 has ceramic brakes, an integrated roll-cage, and 19-inch forged alloy wheels with Michelin Pilot Sport Cup tires.

=== Specifications ===
(Data shown is for the 997 RGT 3.8L model)

- Weight: 2,932 lb (1,330 kg)
- Power: 445 hp (332 kW; 451 PS) at 7600 rpm
- Torque: 310 lb⋅ft (420 N⋅m) at 5100 rpm
- Specific output: approx. 117.1 hp (87 kW) per litre
- Power-to-weight ratio: approx. 6.59 lb (2.99 kg) per horsepower
  - 0–60 mph (0–97 km/h): 4.2 seconds
  - Top speed: 197 mph (317.0 km/h)

== Third generation (2012–present) ==
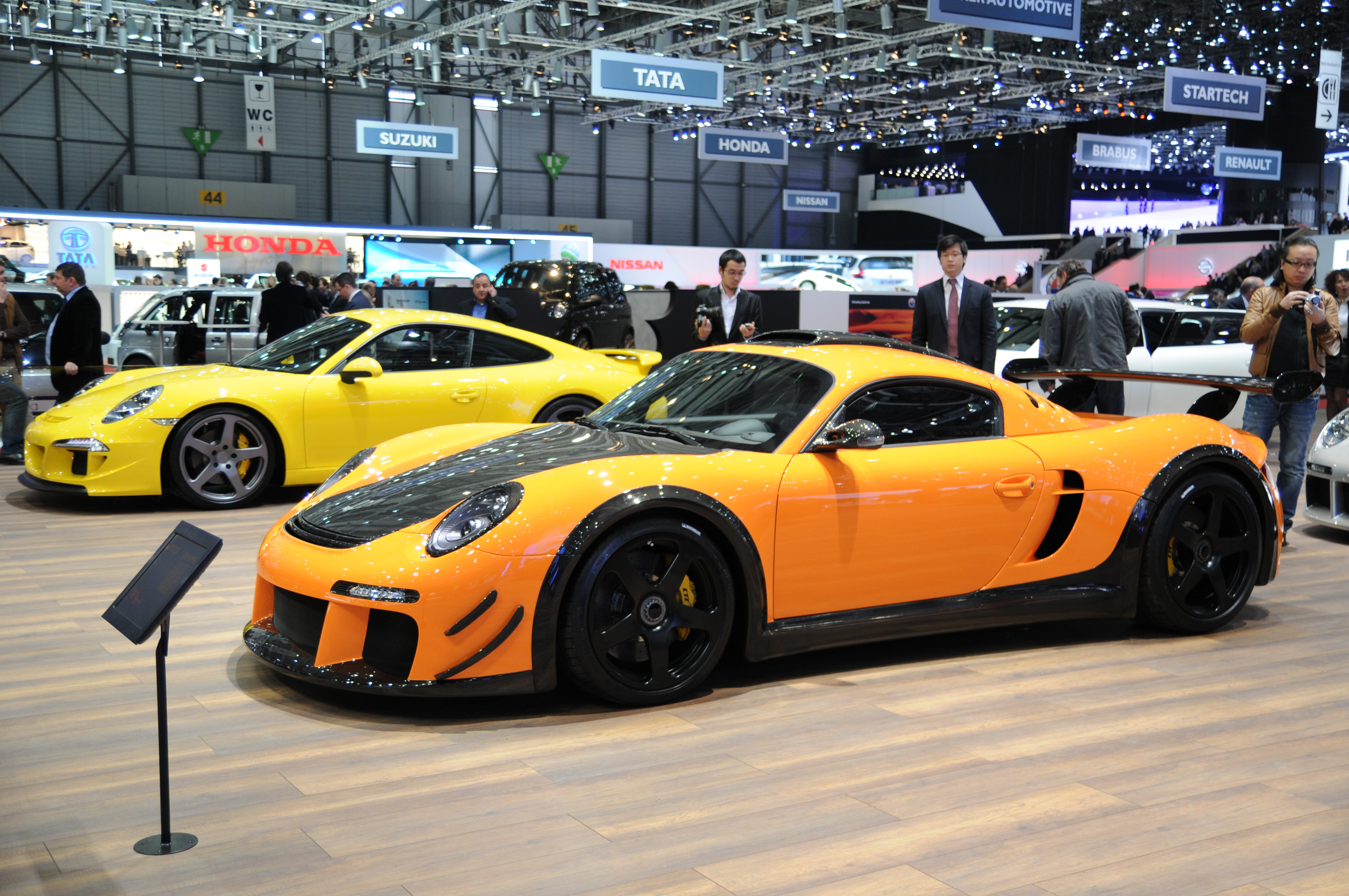
2012 Ruf RGT (left) next to a Ruf CTR3

A new RGT-8 based on the Porsche 991 was unveiled at the 2012 Geneva Motor Show. This version still uses the 4.5-litre V8 engine, but with power and torque outputs raised to 550 PS (405 kW; 542 hp) at 8500 rpm and 369 lb⋅ft (500 N⋅m) at 4000 rpm. Top speed is 318 km/h (197.6 mph). The RGT-8 conversion adds approximately €200,000 to the price of the Porsche 991 donor car.
