= Ruf RTR =

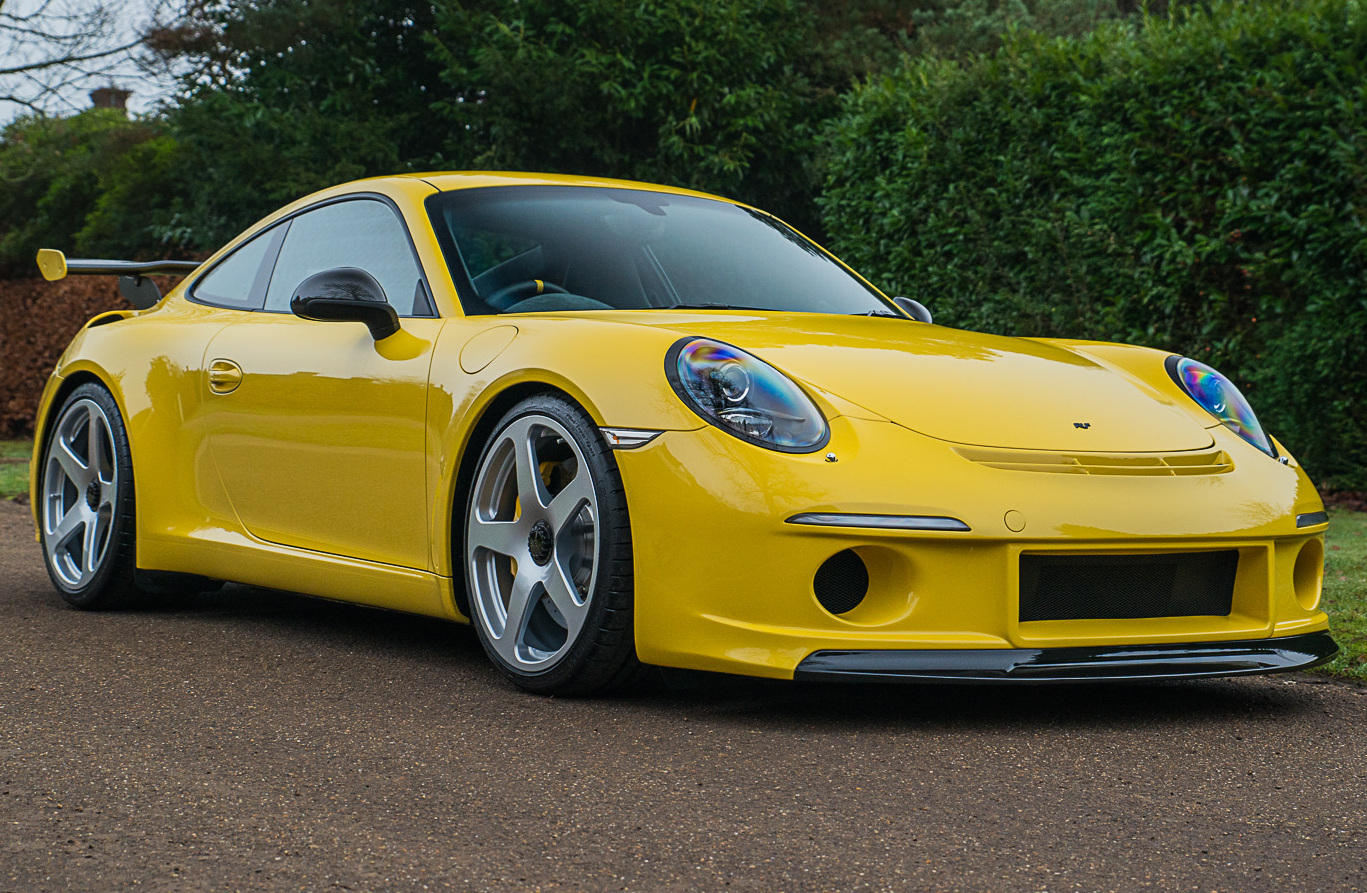
- Ruf RTR "Narrow Body"

Overview
- Manufacturer: Ruf Automobile GmbH
- Production: 2013–2017; 10 produced (reportedly)

Body and chassis
- Class: Sports car (S)
- Layout: Rear engine, rear wheel drive / all wheel drive
- Related: Porsche 991

Powertrain
- Engine: 3.8 L (3,746 cc) twin-turbocharged Ruf RTurbo 590 flat-6
- Transmission: 6-speed manual; 7-speed PDK

Chronology
- Predecessor: Ruf Rt 12

The Ruf RTR is a sports car produced by Ruf Automobile of Germany. Introduced in 2013 on the 40th anniversary of the Ruf Turbo, the RTR is based on the 991 generation Porsche 911 and pays homage to the original Ruf Turbo.

== Model Information ==
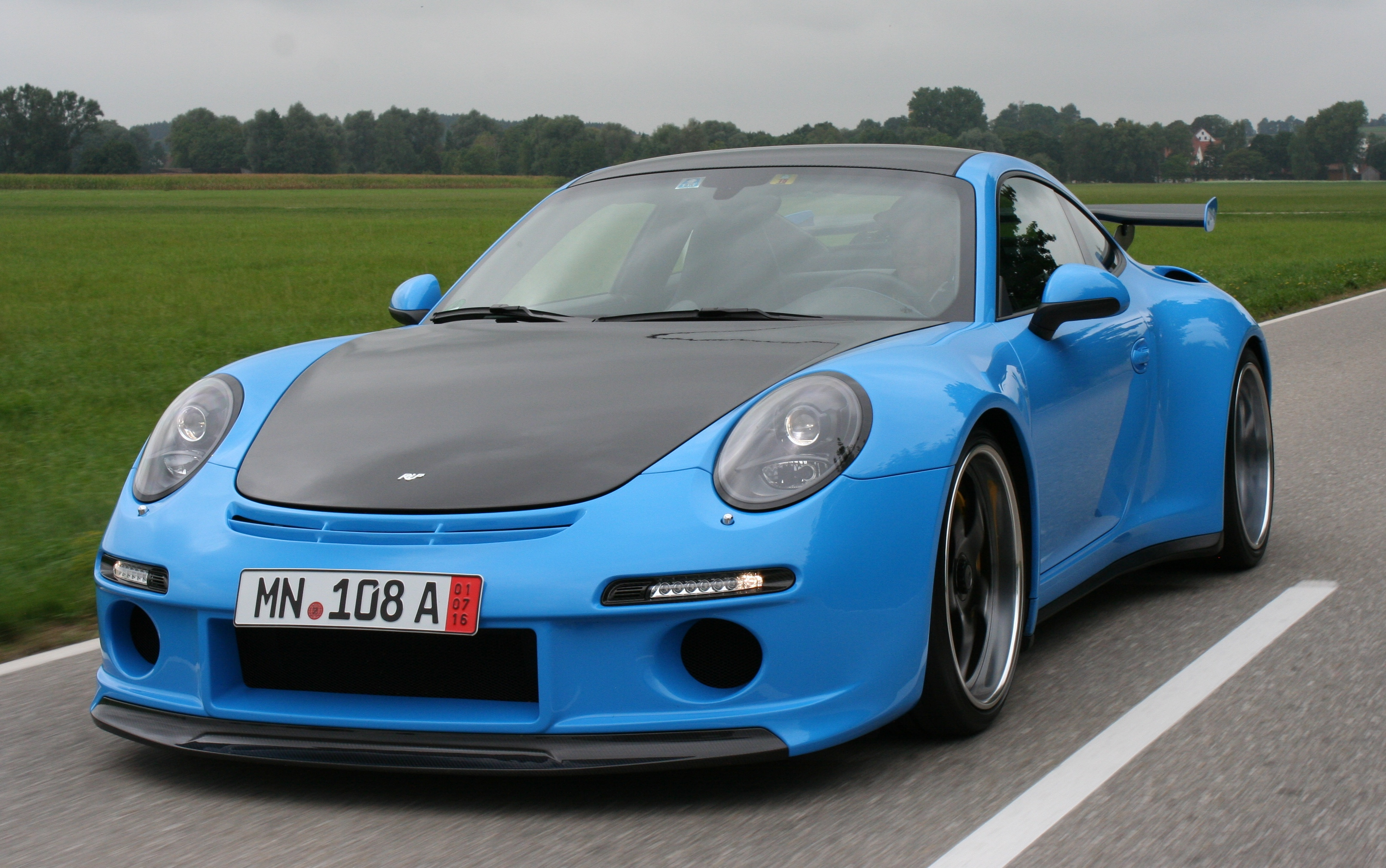
Ruf RTR "Wide Body"

Customers had a choice to either order their car in "narrow body" configuration or with a Ruf designed "wide body" configuration with hand-crafted, widened fenders which add 80 mm (3.15 in) of width at the front and 120 mm (4.73 in) at the rear. In addition to the optional wide body configuration, the exterior features a large rear wing, a redesigned front bumper and special Ruf 5-spoke alloy wheels. It also has an integrated roll cage (IRC); a common feature on Ruf models, and ceramic disc brakes that measure 16.1 inches at the front and 15.4 inches at the rear. 10 RTRs were reportedly built, and, according to Ruf, the RTR is no longer in production. However, it is unknown when production ended.

== Performance ==
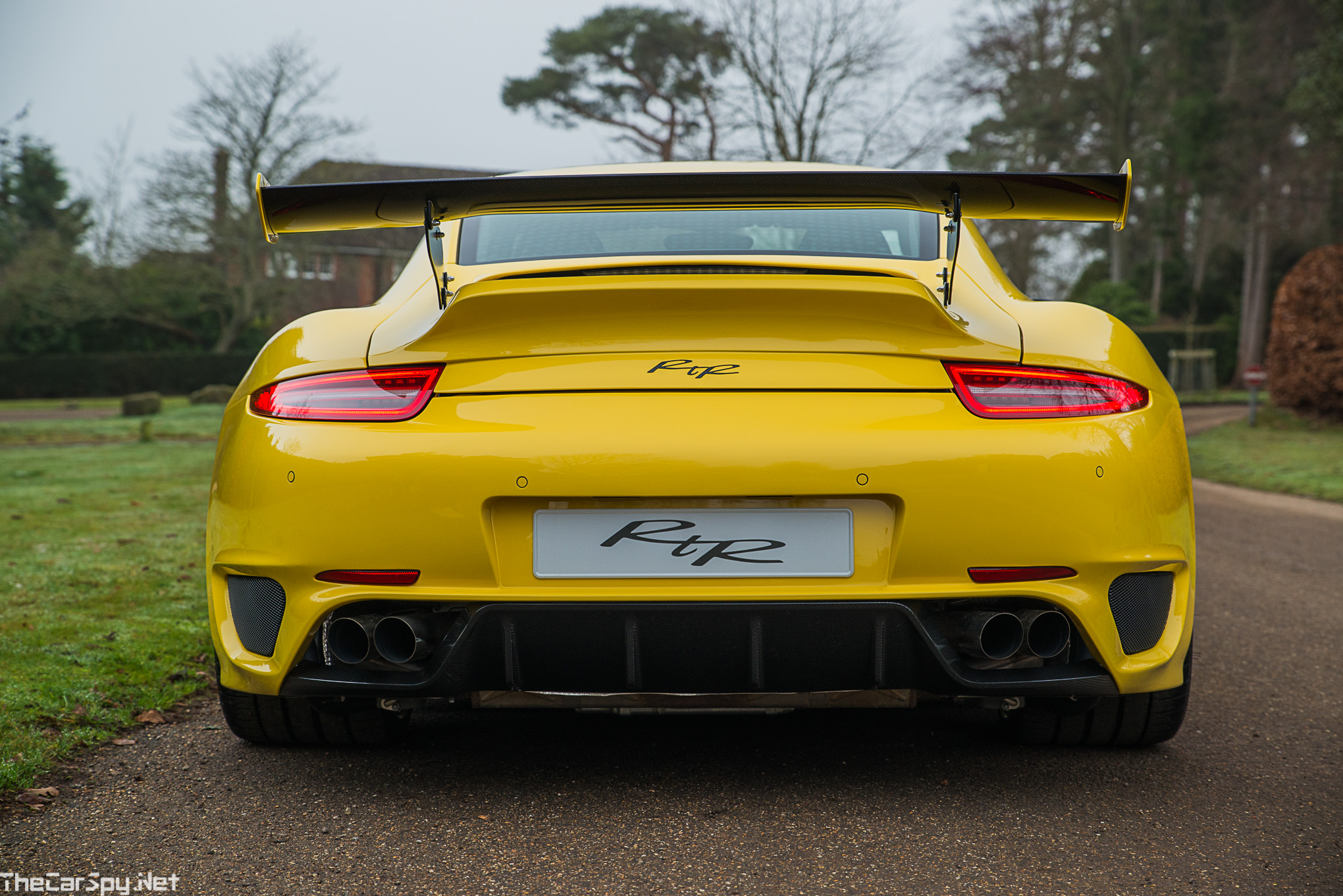
Ruf RTR "narrow body" rear

The RTR was offered with a 3.8-litre (3,746 cc) twin-turbocharged flat-six engine available in two variants. The first variant, based on the A91 engine found in the 991 911 Turbo and Turbo S, produces 645 PS (474 kW; 636 hp) and was available with a choice of a 6-speed manual transmission or a 7-speed PDK. The second variant, based on the older "Mezger block" used in the 997, produces 802 PS (590 kW; 791 hp) at 7,300 rpm and 730 lb⋅ft (990 N⋅m) of torque at 4,500 rpm and was only offered with a 6-speed manual. Also offered for both variants is the choice of rear-wheel drive or all-wheel drive drivetrains. The 802 PS variant has a top speed of 351 km/h (218 mph) and can accelerate to 97 km/h (60 mph) in 3.2 seconds.
