= Ruf Turbo Florio =

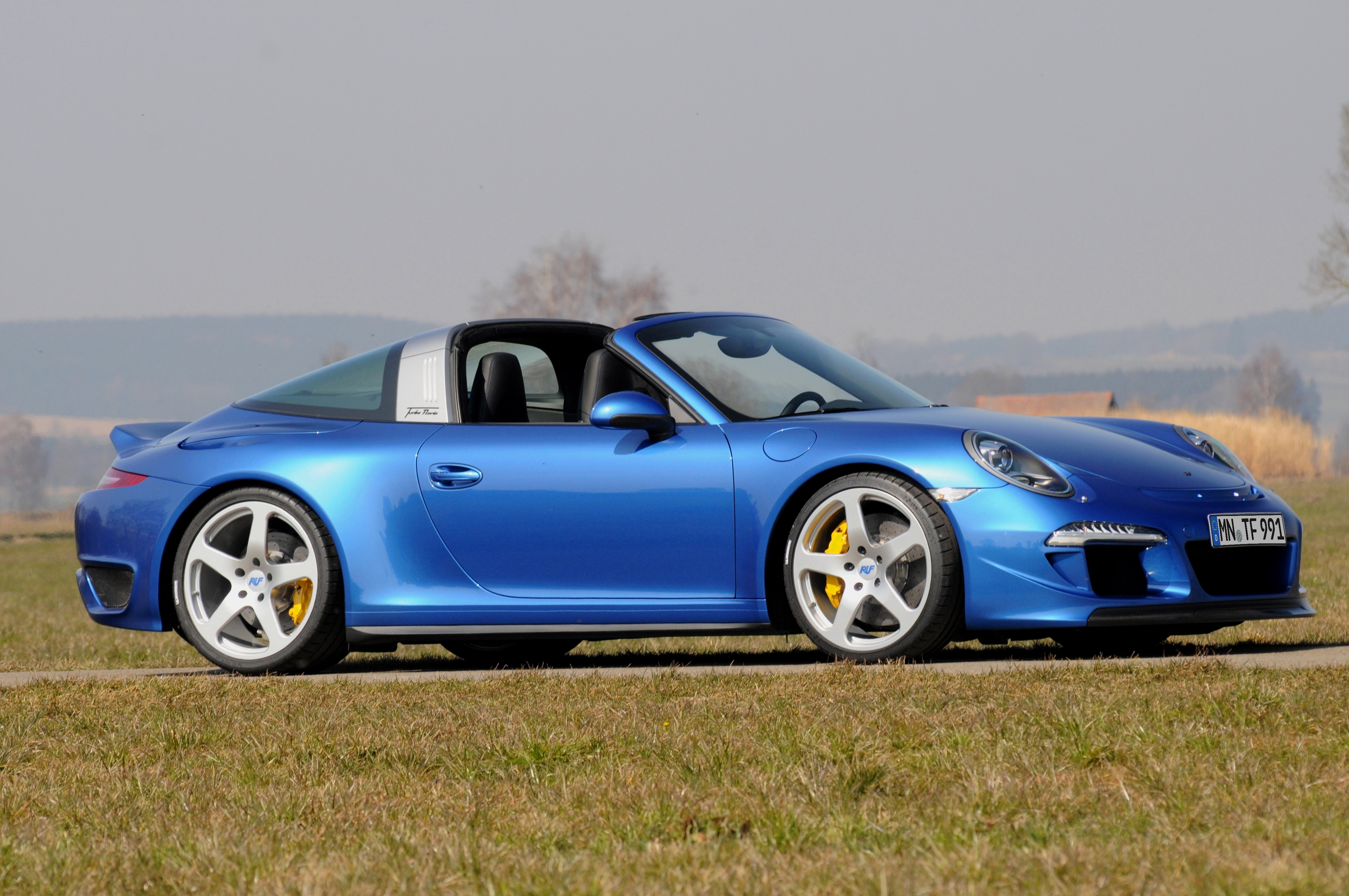

Overview
- Manufacturer: Ruf Automobile
- Production: 2015–2020
- Assembly: Pfaffenhausen, Germany (Ruf Automobile GmbH)

Body and chassis
- Class: Sports car (S)
- Body style: 2-door targa top
- Layout: Rear-engine, rear-wheel-drive / all-wheel-drive
- Related: Porsche 991 Targa 4S

Powertrain
- Engine: 3.8 L MDA.BA twin-turbocharged Flat-6
- Transmission: 7-speed PDK; 6-speed manual

The Ruf Turbo Florio is a two-seater sports car produced by German car manufacturer Ruf Automobile. It was unveiled at the 2015 Geneva Motor Show. The name of the car comes from the Targa Florio, a Sicilian road race after which Porsche's targa top cars are also named. The Turbo Florio is based on the Porsche 991 Targa 4 platform, with significant changes made to the body, engine, and structure of the car.

== Specifications ==
=== Powertrain ===
The Turbo Florio is powered by a 3.8 litre twin-turbocharged flat-six engine generating a maximum power output of 474 kW (644 PS; 636 hp) at 6,500 rpm and 835 N⋅m (616 lb⋅ft) of torque at 3,000-3,500 rpm. The engine is rear mounted and the car can be configured to have an all-wheel drive or a rear-wheel drive layout.

=== Transmission ===
The Turbo Florio can be equipped with either Porsche's 7-speed PDK transmission or a 6-speed manual transmission.

=== Exterior ===
Changes to the exterior of the Turbo Florio over the standard 911 Targa include an elongated front splitter, air intake ducts on each rear fender, a rear diffuser and a duck tail spoiler on the rear of the car for optimised downforce. The car comes equipped with special 5-spoke Ruf alloy wheels.

== Performance ==
Ruf claims a top speed of 330 km/h (205 mph) for the Turbo Florio, which made it the third fastest Ruf automobile of the four models in production at the time, behind the Ruf CTR3 at 380 km/h (236 mph) and the Ruf CTR Anniversary at 360 km/h (224 mph).
