= Porsche 911 (991) =

Porsche 991
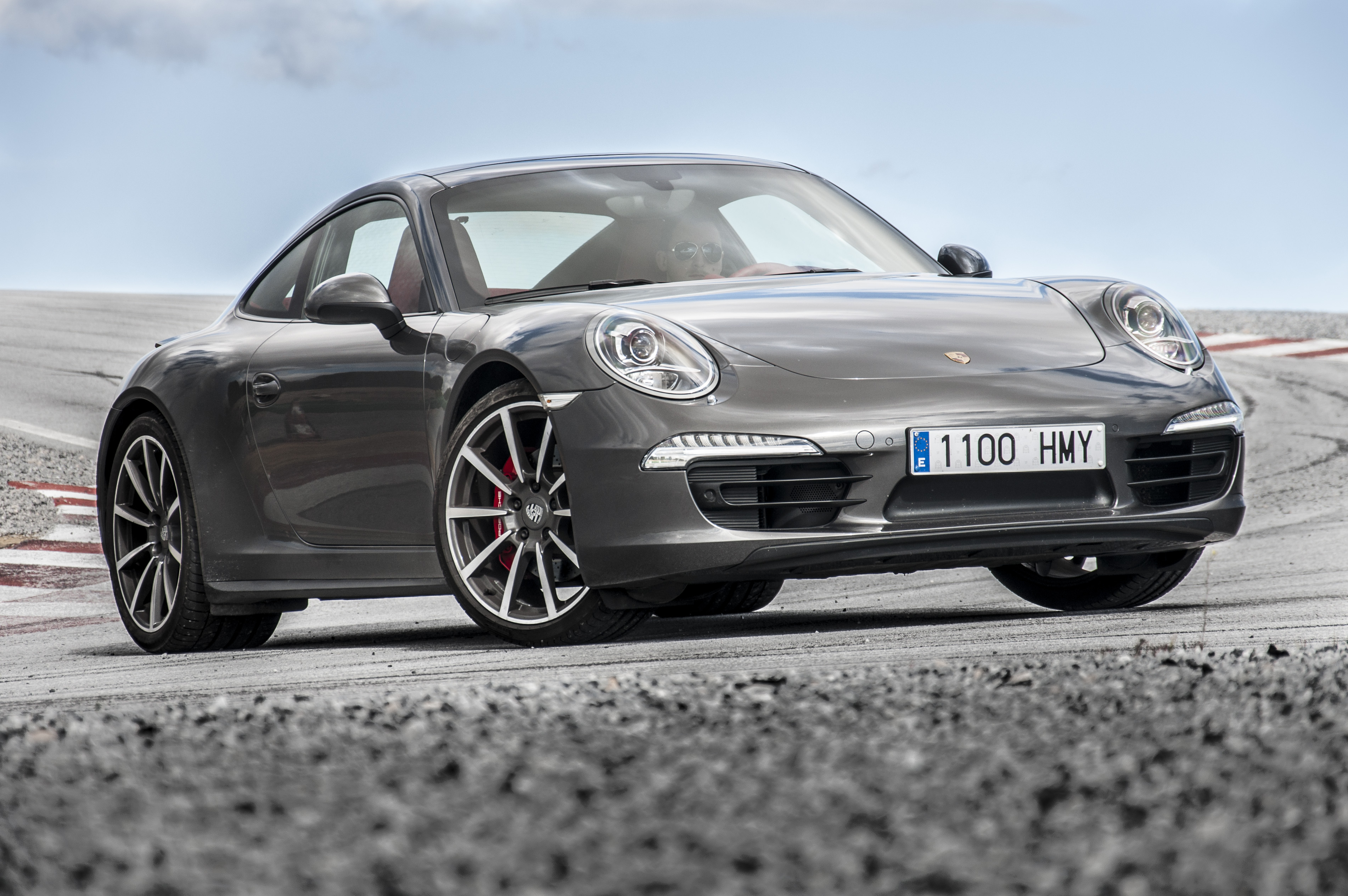
- Porsche 911 (991) Carrera 4S Coupé

Overview
- Manufacturer: Porsche AG
- Also called: Porsche 911; Porsche Carrera
- Production: September 2011 – December 2019
- Assembly: Germany: Stuttgart
- Designer: Michael Mauer (2008)

Body and chassis
- Class: Sports car (S)
- Body style: 2-door coupé; 2-door Targa top; 2-door convertible; 2-door speedster
- Layout: Rear engine, rear wheel drive / all wheel drive
- Related: Ruf RGT; Ruf Turbo Florio; Ruf RTR

Powertrain
- Engine: 3.0 L twin-turbocharged flat-6; 3.4 L flat-6; 3.8 L flat-6; 3.8 L twin-turbocharged flat-6; 4.0 L flat-6
- Transmission: 6-speed manual; 7-speed manual; 7-speed PDK

Dimensions
- Wheelbase: 2,450 mm (96.5 in); 2,457 mm (96.7 in) (GT3)
- Length: 4,491 mm (176.8 in) (Carrera); 4,506 mm (177.4 in) (Turbo); 4,545 mm (178.9 in) (GT3)
- Width: 1,808 mm (71.2 in) (Carrera); 1,880 mm (74.0 in) (Turbo); 1,852 mm (72.9 in) (GT3)
- Height: 1,303 mm (51.3 in) (Carrera); 1,296 mm (51.0 in) (Turbo); 1,269 mm (50.0 in) (GT3)
- Curb weight: 1,435 kg (3,164 lb) (Carrera); 1,495 kg (3,296 lb) (Carrera S); 1,554 kg (3,426 lb) (Carrera S Cabriolet); 1,539 kg (3,393 lb) (Carrera 4S); 1,646 kg (3,629 lb) (Targa 4S); 1,605 kg (3,538 lb) (Turbo); 1,627 kg (3,587 lb) (Turbo S); 1,696 kg (3,739 lb) (Turbo S Cabriolet); 1,485 kg (3,274 lb) (GTS); 1,430 kg (3,150 lb) (GT3); 1,420 kg (3,130 lb) (GT3 RS); 1,470 kg (3,241 lb) (GT2 RS); 1,380 kg (3,042 lb) (935)

Chronology
- Predecessor: Porsche 997
- Successor: Porsche 992

The Porsche 991 is the seventh generation of the Porsche 911 sports car, which was unveiled at the 2011 Frankfurt Motor Show on 15 September as the replacement for the 997. The 991 was an entirely new platform, only the third since the original 911 launched in 1963 (the 996 of 1999 was the second new platform). Production of the 991 generation ended on 20 December 2019, with 233,540 units produced.

== Design ==
Compared to the 997, the 991 is slightly larger, with the wheelbase increased by 100 mm (3.9 in) to 2,450 mm (96.5 in), and the overall length up by 70 mm (2.8 in) to 4,490 mm (176.8 in). A new transaxle was developed so that the rear wheels could be moved 76 mm (3 in) backward in relation to the position of the engine, which significantly improves the weight distribution and cornering performance of the car.

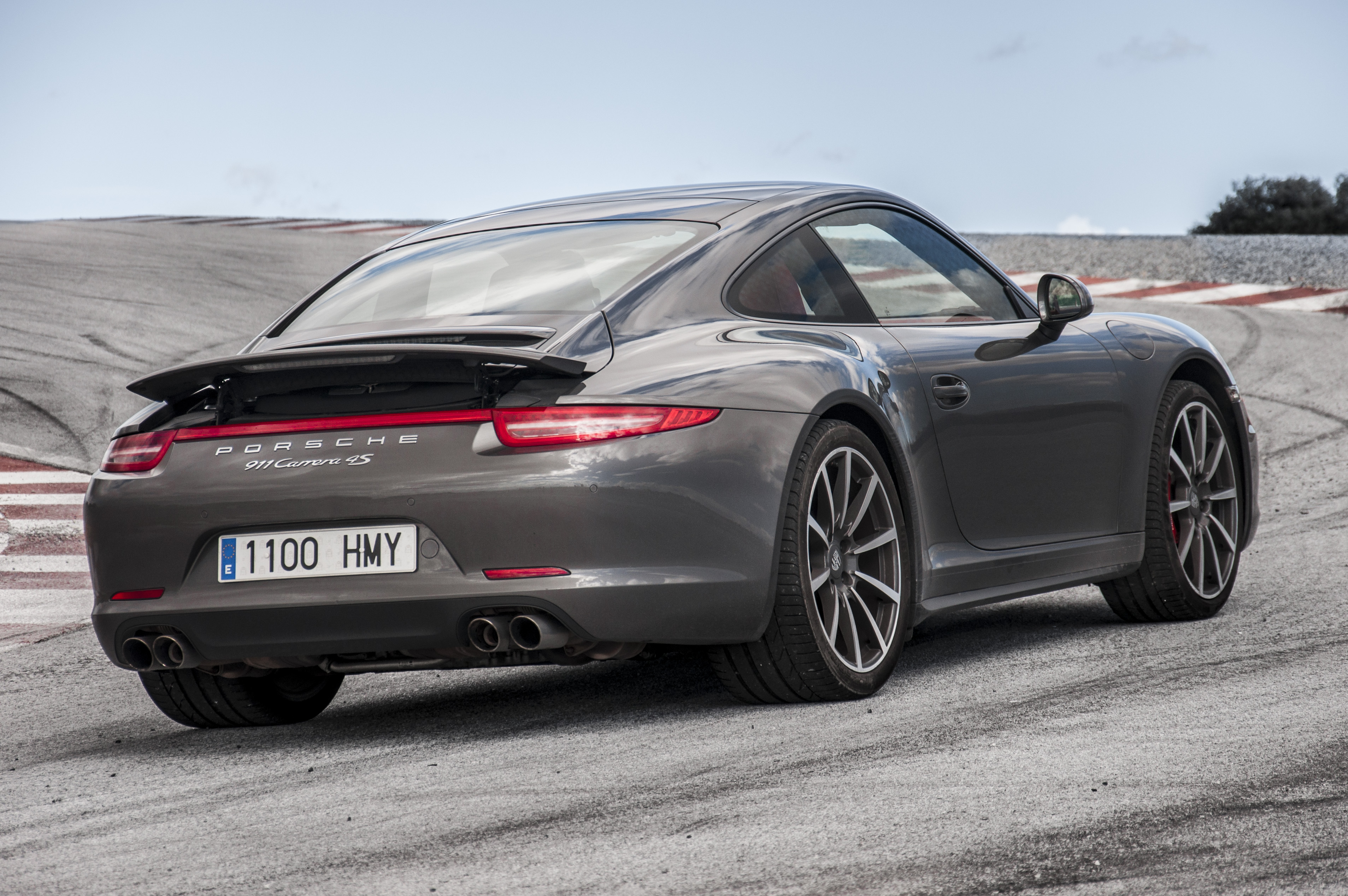
Porsche 911 (991) Carrera 4S Coupé

Due to the use of high-strength steel, aluminium and some composites, the weight was reduced to 1,380 kg (3,042 lb) for the manual Carrera, rising to 1,605 kg (3,538 lb) for the all wheel drive Turbo model if equipped with the PDK transmission (Porsche Doppelkupplung). PDK is available as an option for all 911 Carrera and 911 Turbo (991.1 Non S) models as a 7-speed transmission, featuring manual and automatic modes. Gears 1 to 6 have a sports ratio and top speed is reached in 6th gear. 7th gear has a long ratio and helps to reduce fuel consumption by keeping engine revs low. The PDK is essentially two gearboxes merged into a single unit and thus requires two clutches. For all 991 models, the PDK is produced by ZF Friedrichshafen. The auto start/stop function is standard on all variants of the 911 Carrera.

== First phase (991.1; 2011–2016) ==
=== 911 Carrera and Carrera S (2011–2015) ===
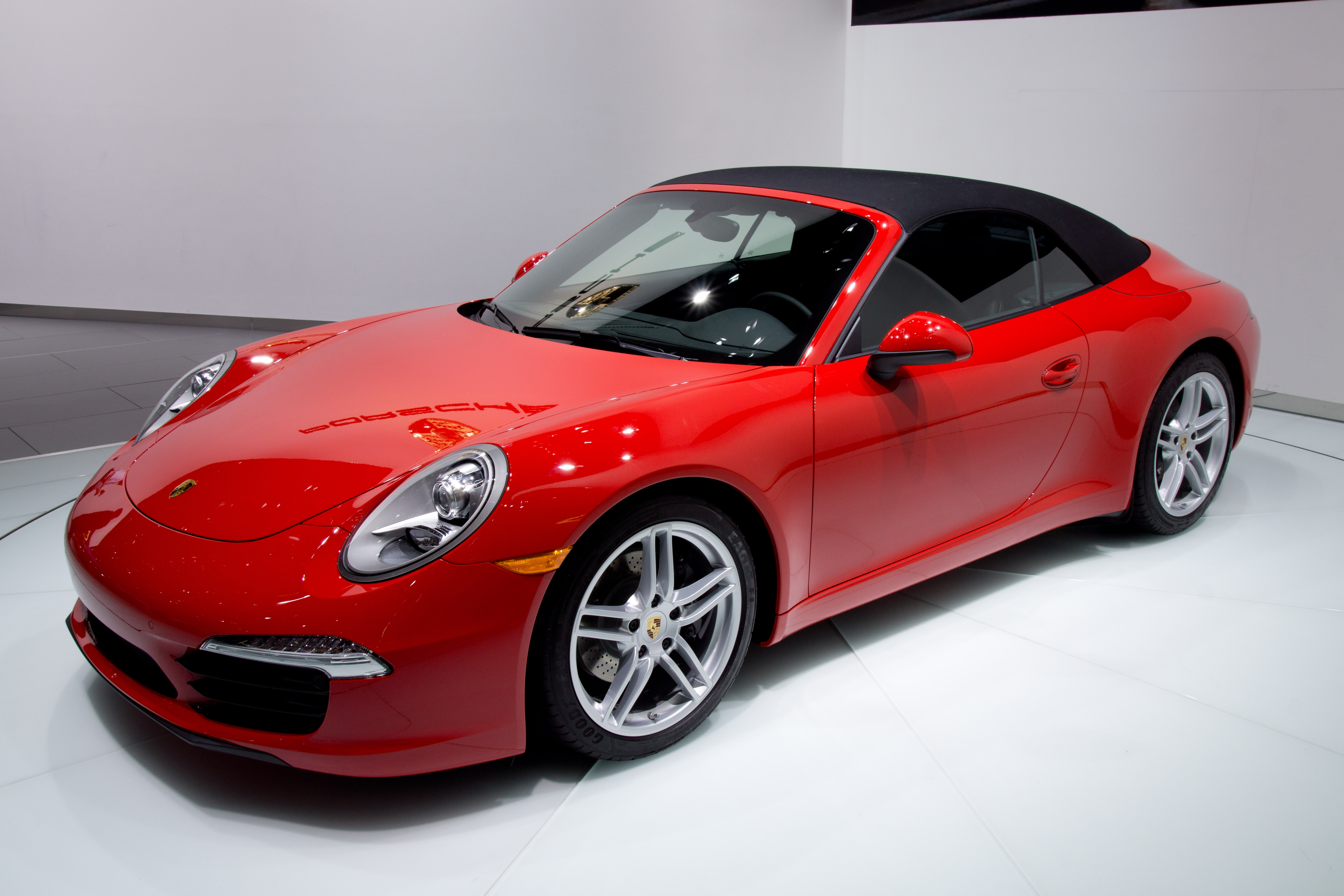
Porsche 991 Carrera Convertible

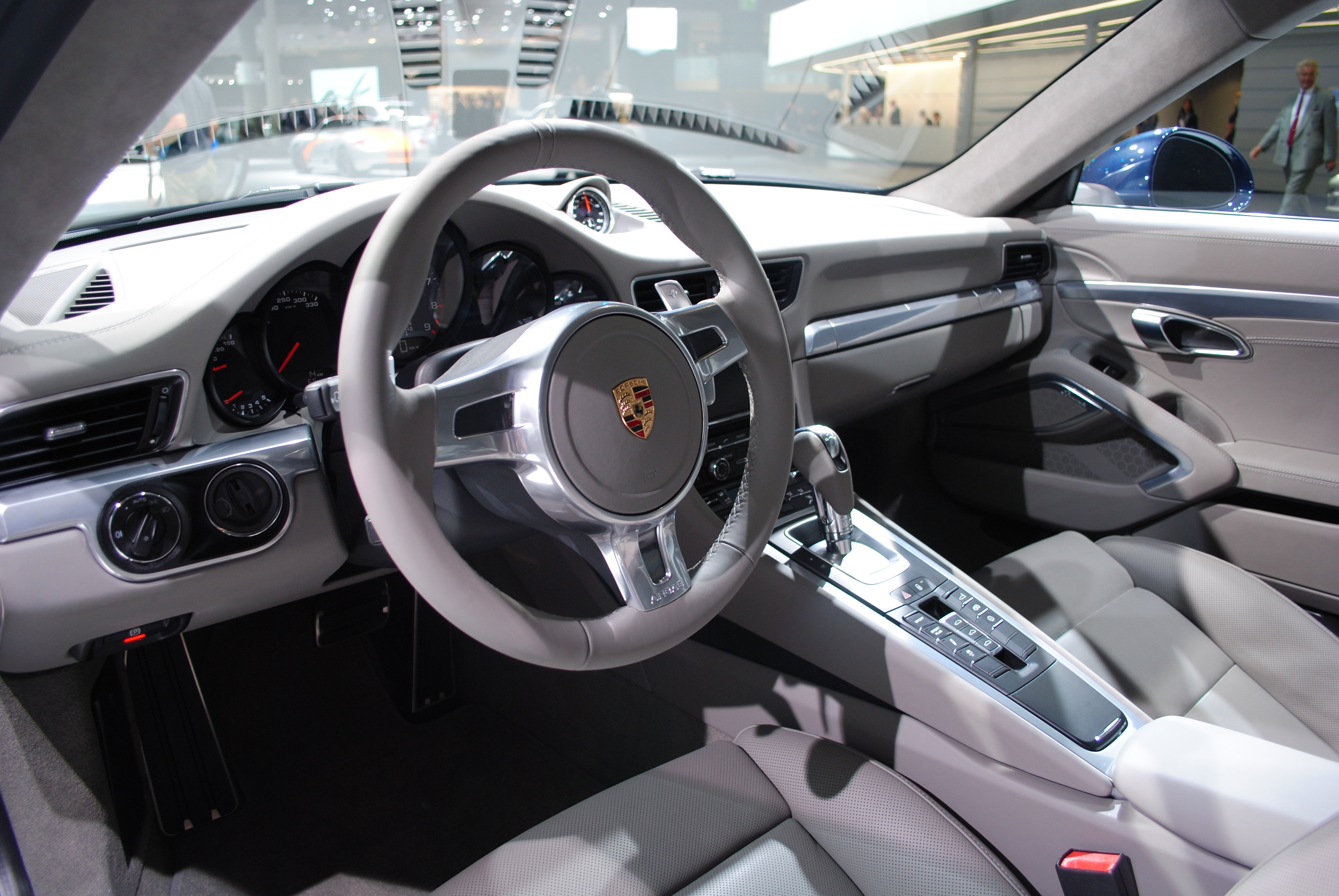
Porsche 991 Carrera S interior

Introduced at the 2011 Geneva Motor Show, the Carrera is equipped with a 3.4-litre boxer engine with direct fuel injection generating a maximum power output of 350 PS (257 kW; 345 hp) at 7,400 rpm and 390 N⋅m (288 lb⋅ft) of torque at 5,600 rpm. The Carrera S has a 3.8-litre engine generating a maximum power output of 400 PS (294 kW; 395 hp) at 7,400 rpm and 440 N⋅m (325 lb⋅ft) of torque at 5,600 rpm.

The convertible variant of the 991 was announced in both Carrera and Carrera S versions at the LA Motor Show in November 2011.

In September 2012, at the Paris Motor Show, the all-wheel-drive variants, the Carrera 4 and 4S, were added to the 991 lineup.

In May 2012, Porsche revealed the Carrera S Club Coupe. The main difference was a power increase (from 400 to 430 hp) and a ducktail spoiler. It was only offered in Brewster Green, had 5-spoke silver over dark green rims, yellow PCCB brakes, chrome window trim and Club Coupe lettering on sides. Thirteen cars were made worldwide.

Also in 2013, Porsche showed the Carrera 4S Exclusive Edition. It features a power increase, ducktail spoiler and dark grey exterior with silver over black 5-spoke rims. It was limited to 5 units only for UK.

Again in 2013, for Asia Pacific and Middle East, Porsche introduced the Carrera S Exclusive Edition. It has a black paintjob with red accents, black over red rims, Aerokit Cup Package and black with red interior. Production totals are unknown.

In 2014, Porsche introduced the Carrera S Martini Racing Edition as a tribute to Porsche's motorsport heritage. The car has Martini stripes and comes with the Aerokit Cup Package. A total of 80 units were made.

In November 2014, Porsche introduced the Carrera 4S Exclusive Swiss Edition, only for the Swiss market. These cars were painted in dark grey exterior and dark grey over silver 5-spoke rims. They also feature red stitching and swiss flag doorstep and Sport Design front bumper. A total of 14 cars were produced.

=== 911 Carrera GTS (2014–2016) ===
Introduced in November 2014 at the LA Motor Show, the 991 Carrera GTS sits between the Carrera S and GT3. Base options included with purchase: power output of 430 PS (316 kW; 424 hp), Sport Chrono Package, Sport Exhaust System, Dynamic Engine Mounts, 10 mm lowered suspension, Porsche Torque Vectoring (PTV) system, LED daytime running lights with Porsche Dynamic Lighting System (PDLS), Sport Design Front Spoiler, Sport Design Side Mirrors, GTS badging, and 20-inch centerlock wheels. When optioned with PDK, acceleration from 0–97 km/h (0–60 mph) is achieved consistently at 3.8 seconds with the help of Launch Control.

In 2015, for China, Porsche introduced the Carrera GTS Jebsen 60th Anniversary Edition made to celebrate 60 years of the Jebsen Group. Limited to 10 units, it features a light grey paintjob with black over white 5-spoke rims, dark grey Porsche side stripes and upper stripe.

The 2016 model year also brought about the Rennsport Reunion Edition, limited to 25 cars, which feature a Fashion Grey livery and a 436 PS (321 kW; 430 hp) naturally aspirated 3.8-litre flat-six engine available exclusively with a manual transmission. It also included 18-way power sports seats, PASM adaptive suspension, Bose audio system, rear parking sensors, carbon-fiber dashboard trim, 20-inch sport classic wheels, adaptive headlights (PDLS, or Porsche Dynamic Light System), and a host of decals for the hood, doors, roof, and decklid plus a key fob painted the same Fashion Gray as the car, and a special leather case for the key with "911 Carrera GTS Rennsport Reunion Edition" lettering.

==== 911 Carrera GTS Club Coupe (2016) ====
The Club Coupe was introduced to celebrate the 60th anniversary of the Porsche Club of America. Just 60 Club Coupes were produced for the 2016 model year. Notable changes from the standard GTS include 20" alloy wheels (the same as those found on the 2014 50th Anniversary Edition) which pays homage to the "Fuchs"-style wheels on classic 911s, special "Club Blau" exterior paint, SportDesign bodywork, and a "ducktail"-style spoiler which references classic motorsports-oriented 911s, for example the Carrera RS 2.7. The interior features Club Coupe-specific dashboard trim, door sills, and centre console lid.

The Club Coupe had an MSRP of $136,060 excluding destination fee and was only available to Porsche Club of America members.

=== 911 50th Anniversary Edition (2014) ===
To commemorate the 50th anniversary of the 911's introduction, Porsche introduced the 911 50th Anniversary Edition at the 2013 Frankfurt Motor Show for the 2014 model year. 1,963 individually-numbered examples were produced. The 50th Anniversary Edition was based on the Carrera S, including the standard 400PS/394 hp 3.8L flat-6 and standard 7-speed manual with the 7-speed PDK transmission as an available option. Contrary to the standard Carrera S, however, the 50th Anniversary Edition features the Porsche Active Suspension Management system and Porsche Torque Vectoring as standard equipment. The optional Powerkit increased the engine's output to 430PS/424 hp.

Cosmetically, the 50th Anniversary Edition features the wider body of the Carrera 4S, 10 mm lower suspension, special 20" alloy wheels which reference the iconic Fuchs wheels on classic 911s, chrome trim across the body including the vents on the rear engine cover and window trim, standard SportDesign side mirrors, and a special "911 50" rear badge. Three colours were available: Geyser Grey, Graphite Grey, and black monochrome. On the interior, the 50th Anniversary Edition has vintage-style green instrument dials, white instrument dial needles, retro "houndstooth" seat inserts, and a badge on the trim above the glovebox commemorating the special edition and listing the production number of the vehicle.

The 50th Anniversary Edition carried an MSRP of €121,119 including VAT or £92,257, and was only made available to current Porsche owners.

=== 911 Targa 4 and 4S (2014–2016) ===
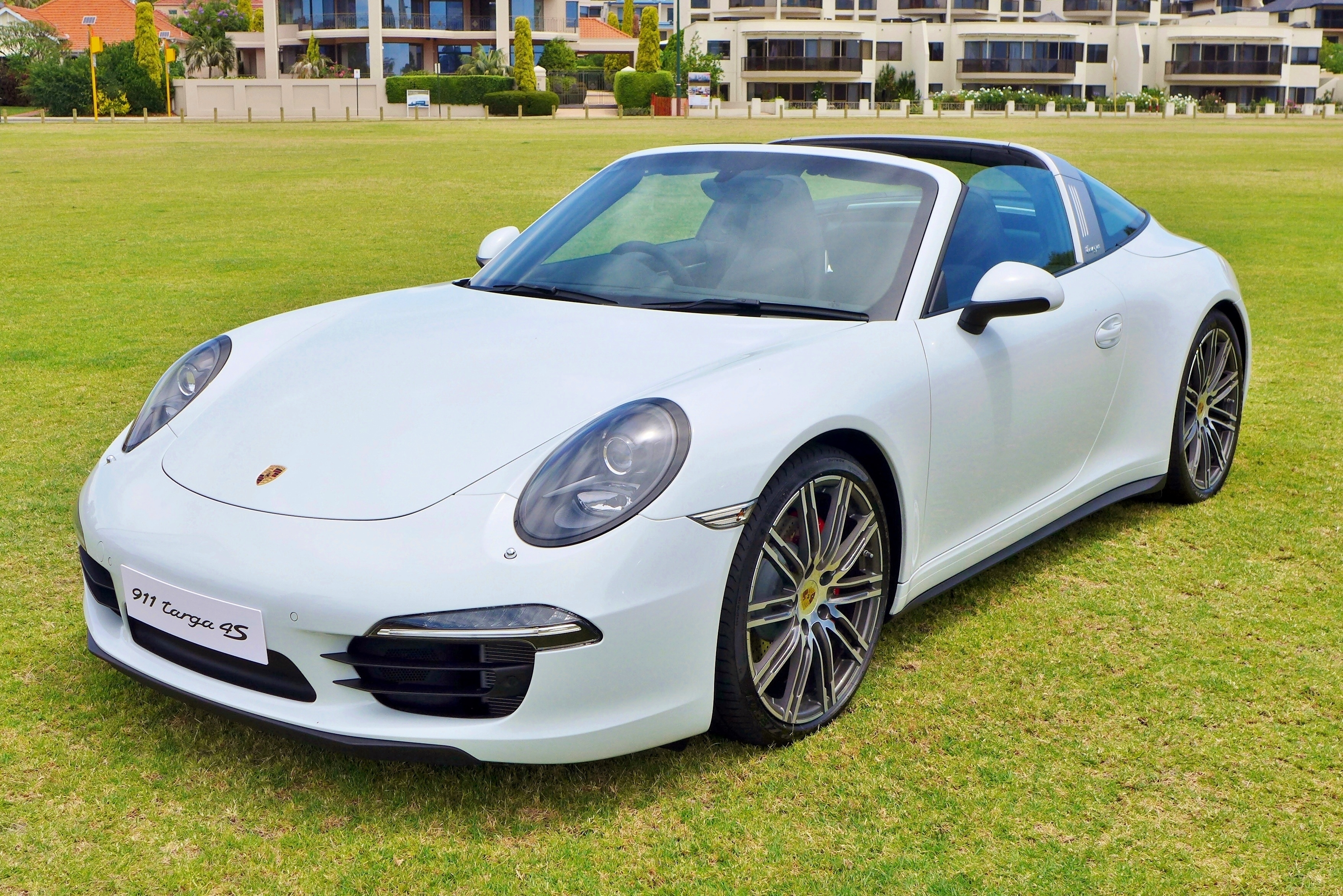

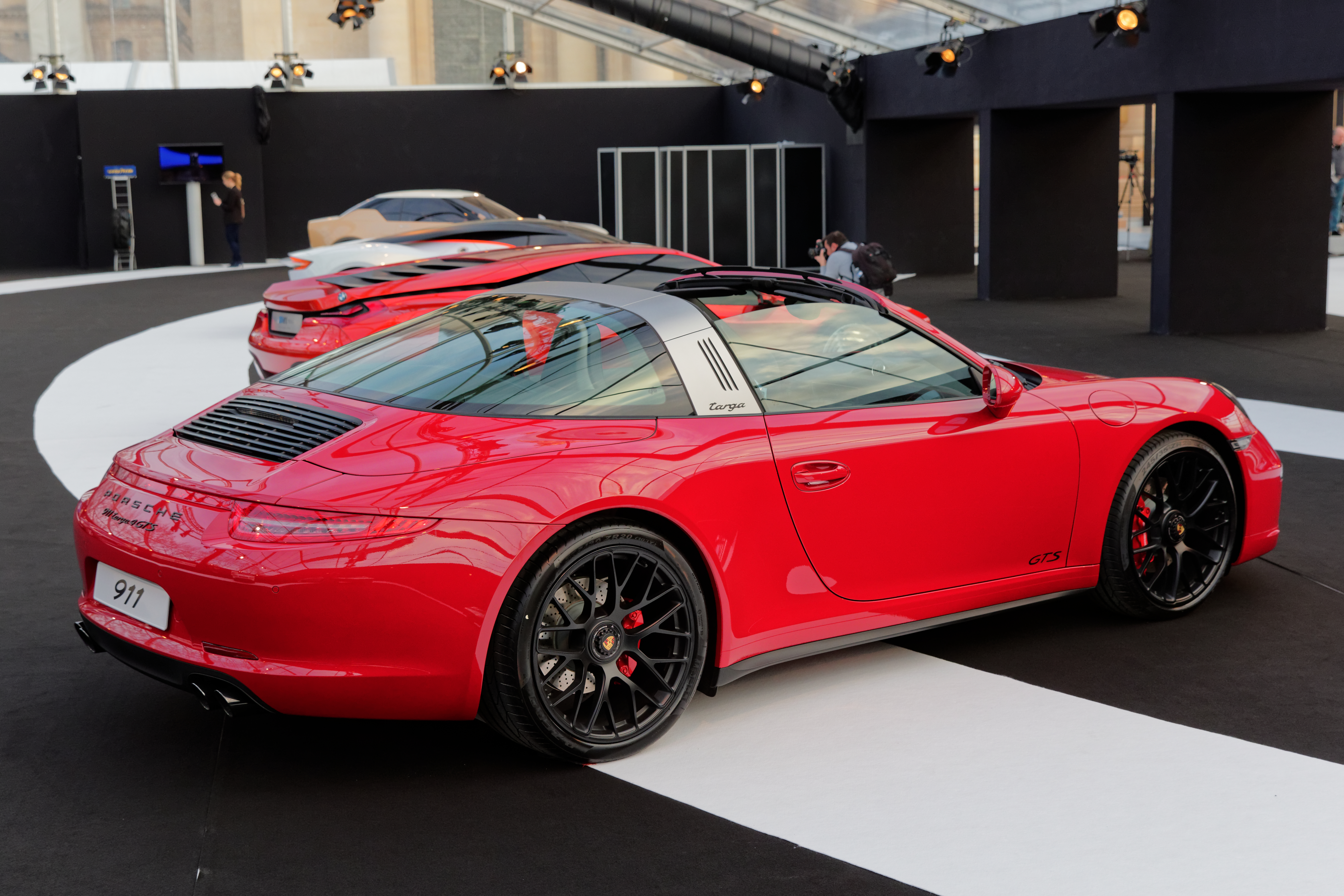
Porsche 911 Targa 4S (top) and Targa 4 GTS (bottom)

At the Detroit Motor Show in January 2014, Porsche introduced the Targa 4 and Targa 4S models. These new derivatives come equipped with an all-new roof technology with the original targa design, now with an electronically operated soft top along with the original B-pillar and the glass 'dome' at the rear.

On 12 January 2015, Porsche announced the 911 Targa 4 GTS at the North American International Auto Show in Detroit. Similar in appearance to the existing Targa 4 and 4S models, the GTS added the 430 PS (316 kW; 424 bhp) engine plus several otherwise optional features.

In 2015, Porsche introduced the Targa 4S Exclusive Mayfair Edition. It features black over silver 5-spoke rims, silver or dark grey paint and "Florio" script on the side. It was limited to ten examples, all of which were sold in UK.

Also in 2015, at the Amsterdam Motor Show, Porsche unveiled the Targa 4S Exclusive Edition. It is painted in light blue color and has black over silver 5-spoke rims. It features black Porsche decals on sides and full Sport Design package. Fifteen units were sold only in Netherlands.

Porsche also produced a limited edition for the Italian market called the Targa 4S 30th Anniversary Porsche Italy. It features a light blue metallic paintjob and black 5-spoke rims. A total of 30 cars were sold only in Italy.

On the 50th anniversary of the 911 Targa, Porsche introduced the Targa 4S Exclusive Belgium Edition, featuring dark grey paint, sport design front bumper, and black 5-spoke rims. It was limited to 10 units only for Belgium.

=== 911 GT3 (2013–2015) ===
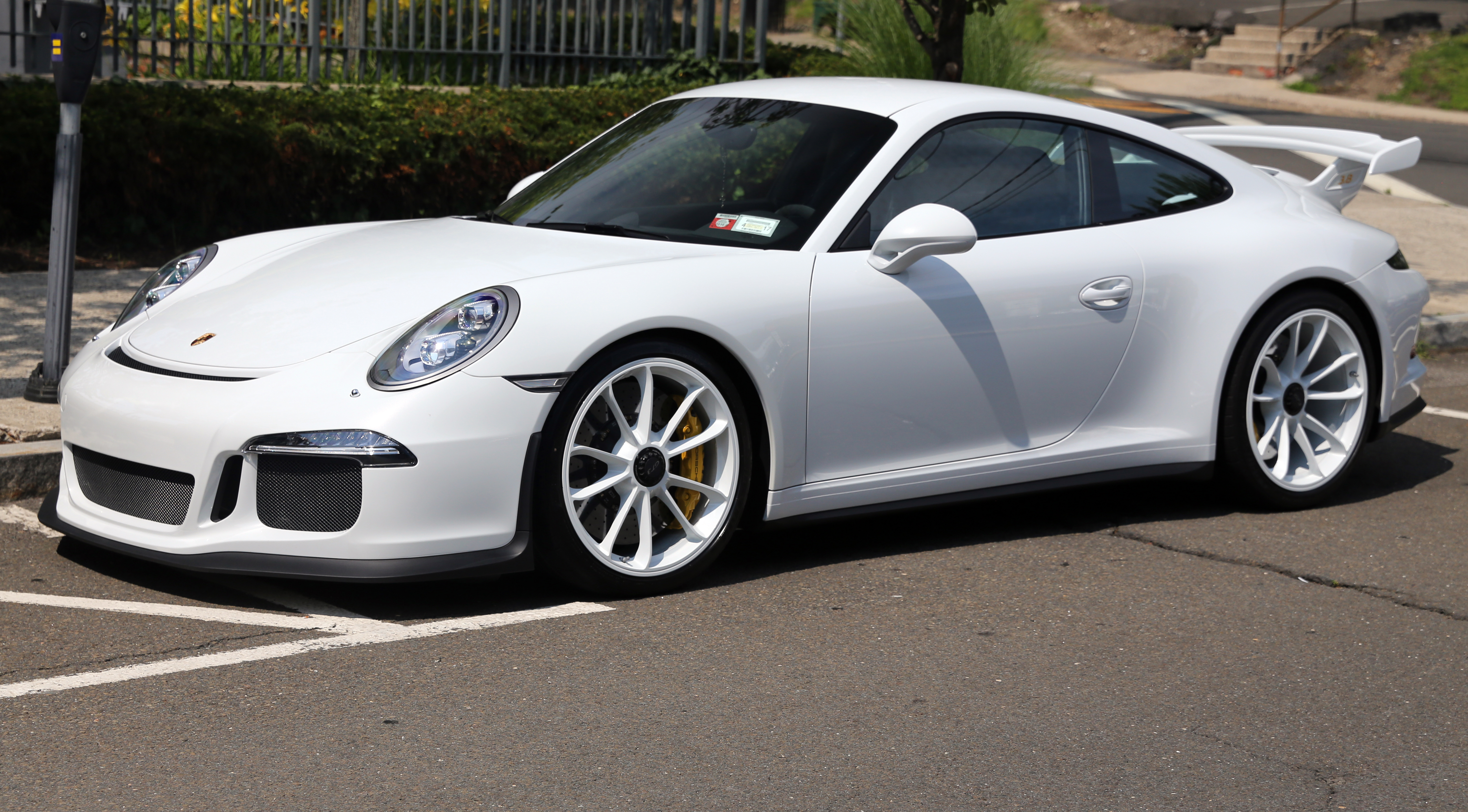

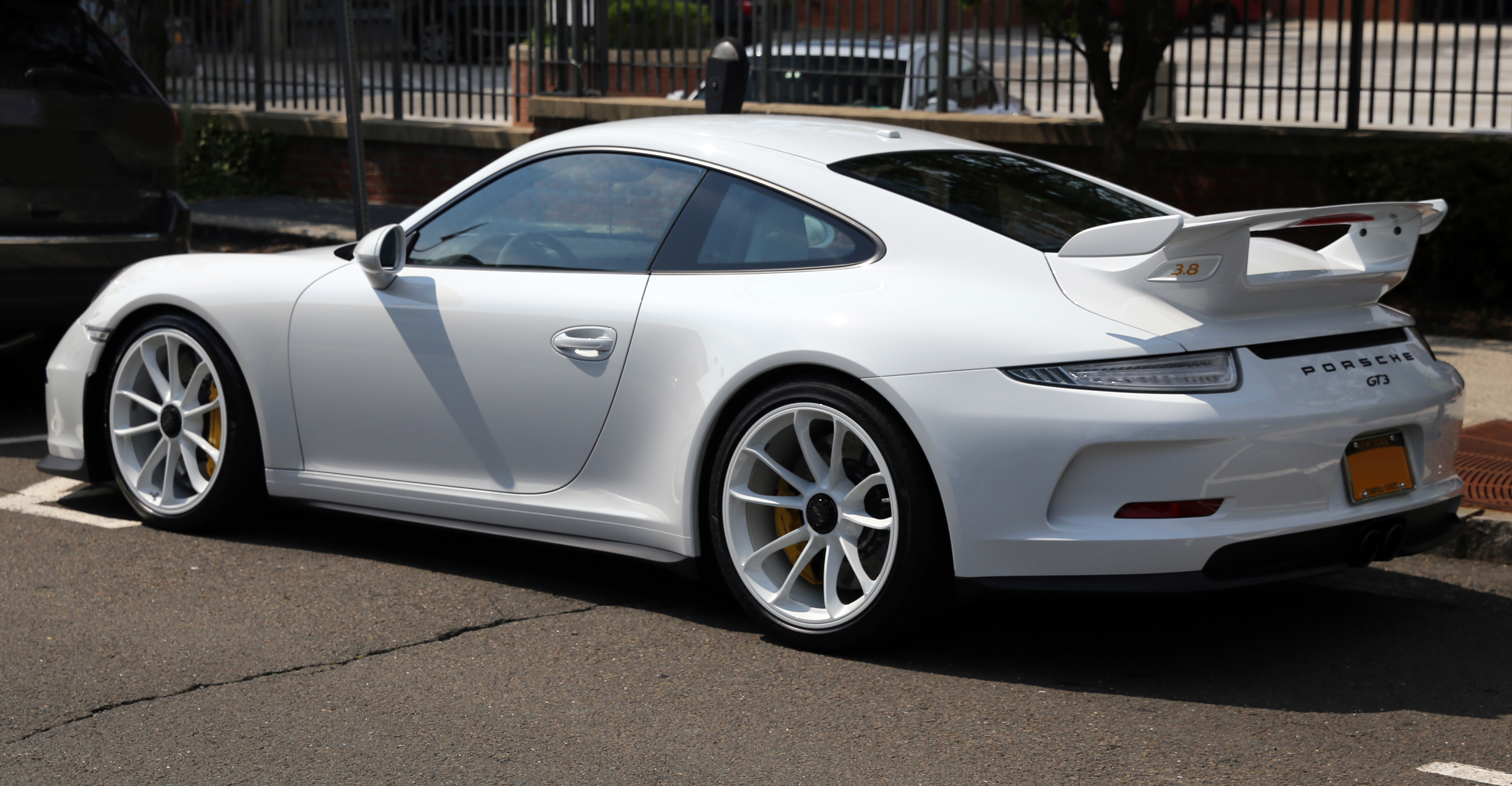
Porsche 911 GT3

The GT3 variant was added to the 991 line up at the 2013 Geneva Motor Show equipped with Porsche's new active rear wheel steering. The system is claimed to provide higher lateral dynamics than previously available by the manufacturer. Car speed inputs determine whether the rear wheels steer in the same or opposite direction of the front wheels. It is the first GT3 model to be offered with an automatic transmission.

At the start of 2014, deliveries of the GT3 were halted following two incidents of the car catching fire. A subsequent recall to replace the engines of all 785 cars manufactured at that time was announced in March 2014 before production of the GT3 would restart.

=== 911 GT3 RS (2015–2016) ===
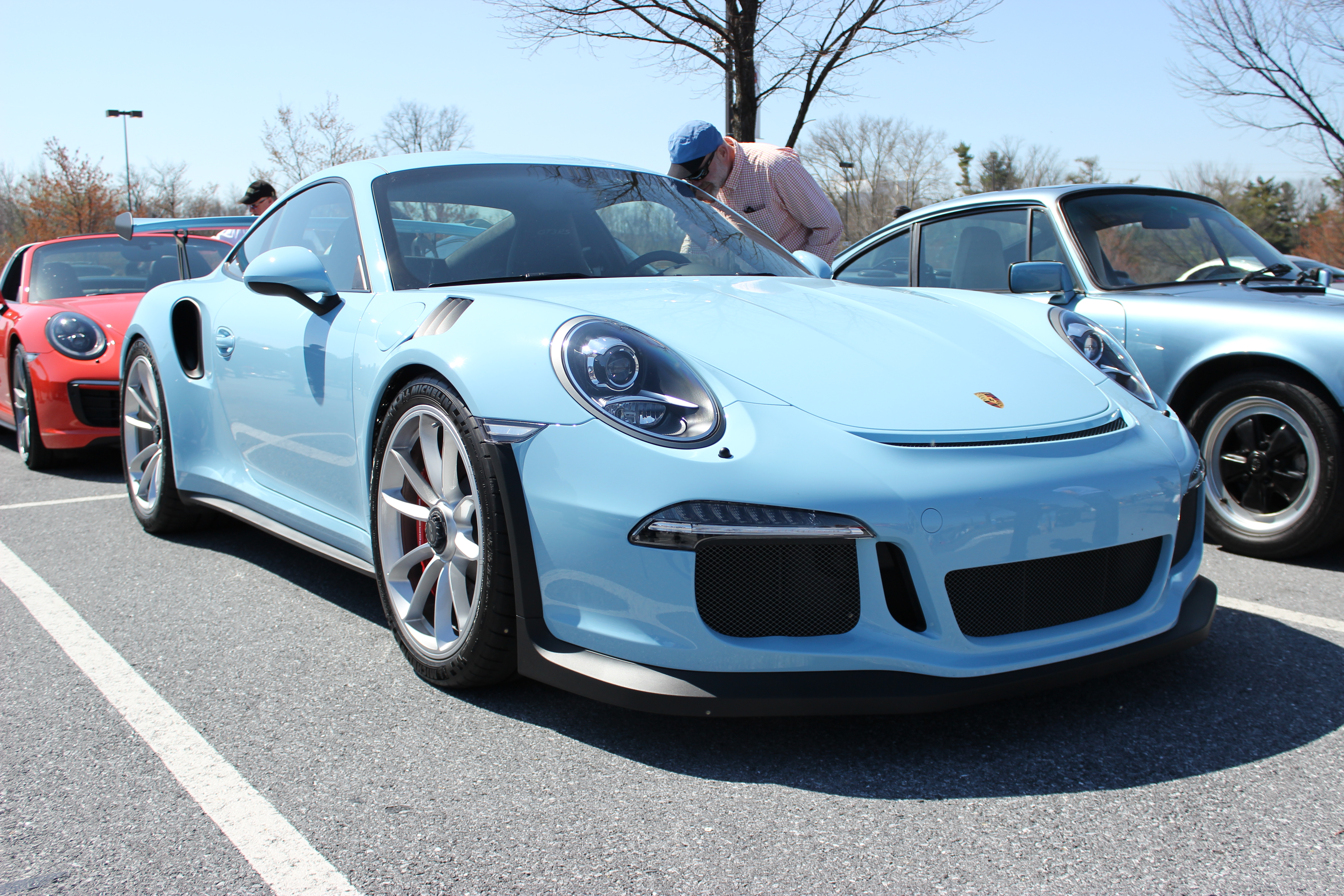

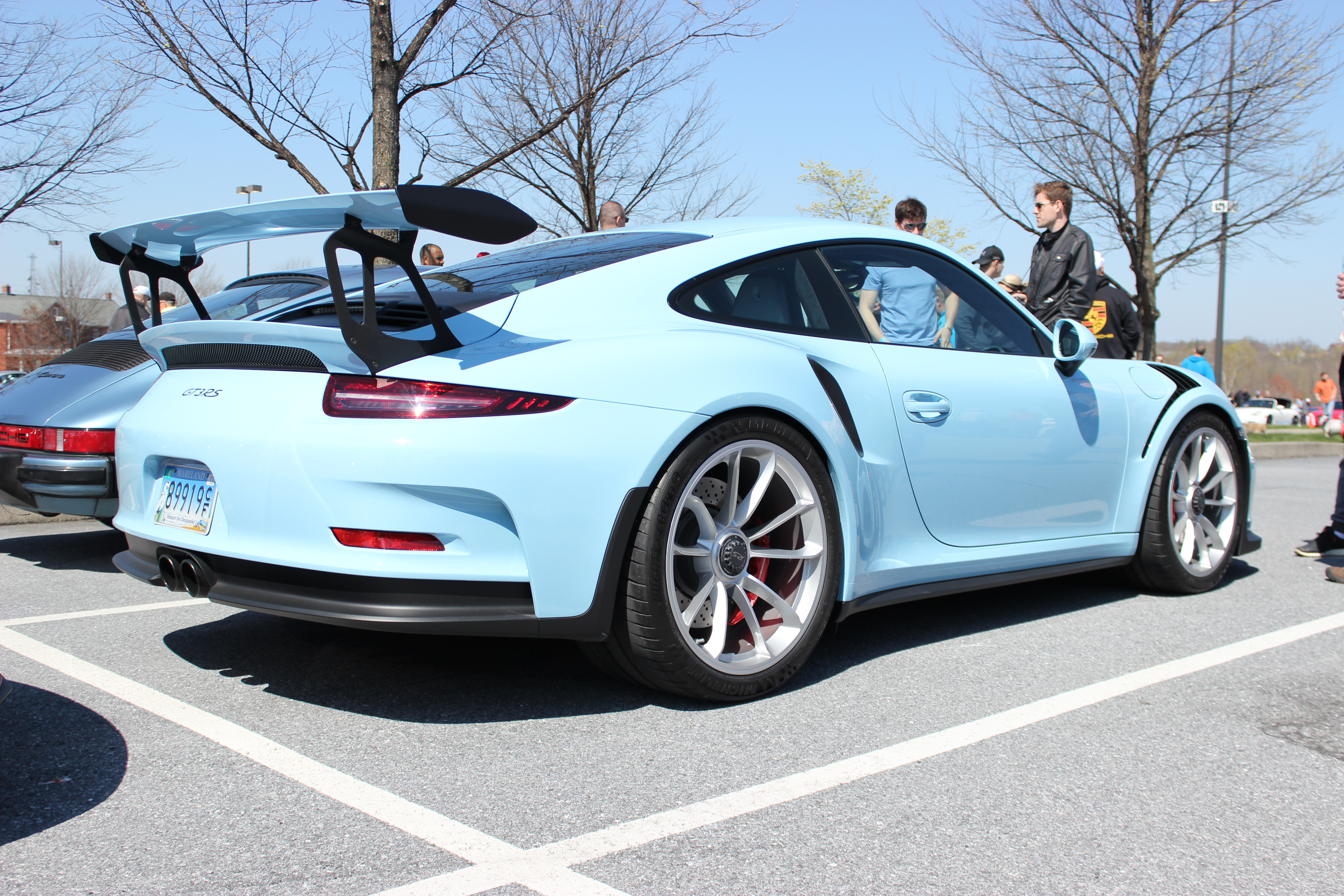
Porsche 911 (991) GT3 RS

Porsche launched the RS version of the 991 GT3 at the Geneva Motor Show in 2015. Compared to the 991 GT3, the front fenders are now equipped with louvers above the wheels and the rear fenders now include intakes taken from the 911 Turbo, rather than an intake below the rear wing. The roof is made from magnesium. The interior includes full bucket seats (based on the carbon seats of the 918 Spyder), carbon-fibre inserts, lightweight door handles and the Club Sport Package as standard (a bolted-on roll cage behind the front seats, preparation for a battery master switch, and a six-point safety harness for the driver and fire extinguisher with mounting bracket).

The 3.8-litre unit found in the 991 GT3 is replaced with a 4.0-litre unit generating a maximum power output of 500 PS (368 kW; 493 hp) and 339 lb⋅ft (460 N⋅m) of torque. The transmission is PDK only. The car is able to accelerate from 0–100 km/h (0–62 mph) in 3.3 seconds (0.6 seconds quicker than the 997 GT3 RS 4.0) and to 0–200 km/h (0–124 mph) in 10.9 seconds. The 991 GT3 RS also comes with functions such as declutching by "paddle neutral" — comparable to pressing the clutch with a conventional manual gearbox – and a Pit Speed limiter button. As with the 991 GT3, there is rear-axle steering and Porsche Torque Vectoring Plus system with fully variable rear axle differential lock.

=== 911 R (2016) ===
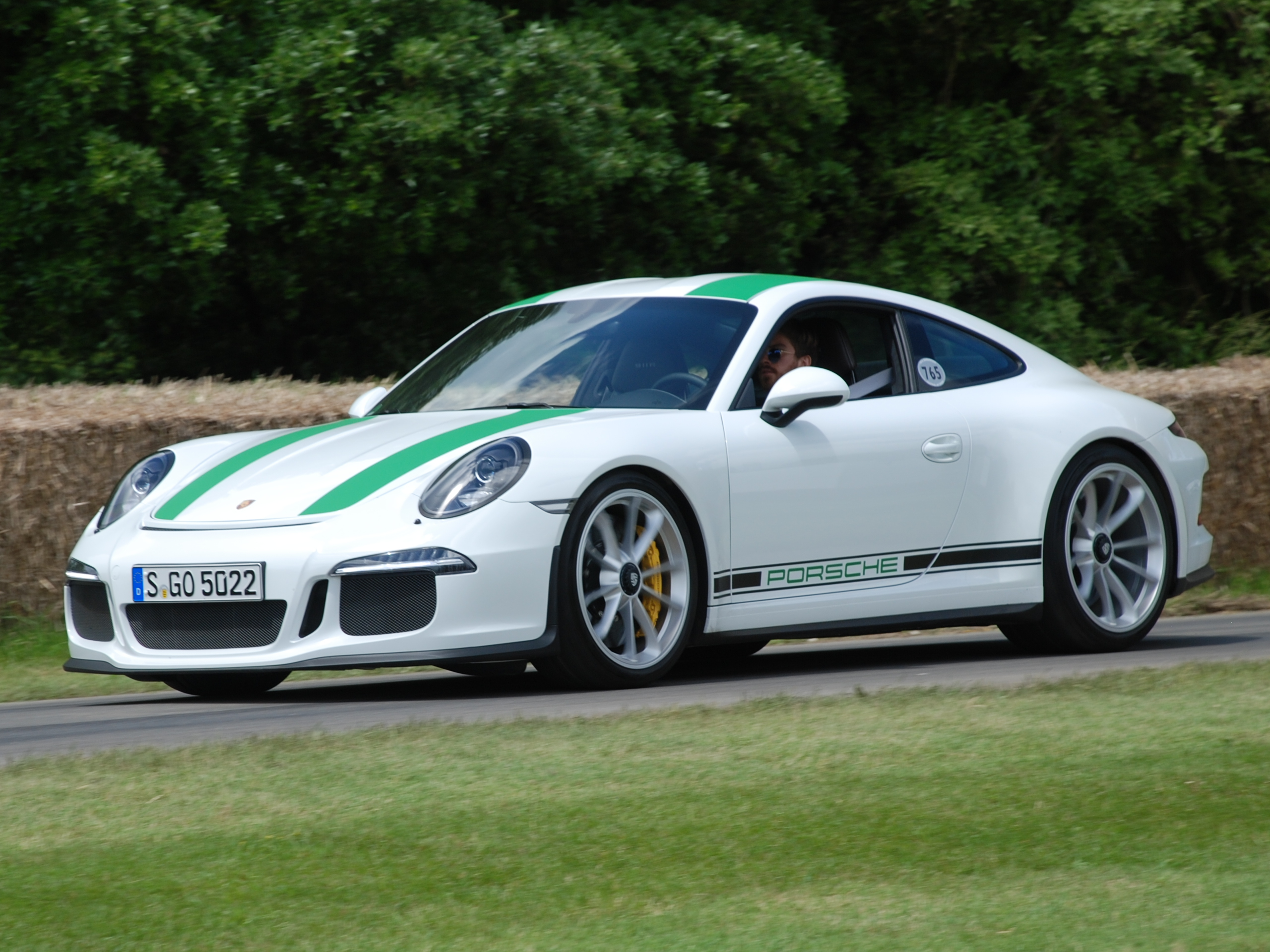
Porsche 911 R

Unveiled at the 2016 Geneva Motor Show on 1 March, the 911 R shares most of its underpinnings with the GT3 RS, but does not include the roll cage, rear wing, and associated bodywork for a weight saving of 50 kg (110 lb). The 911 R comes only with a 6-speed manual transmission, and has a top speed of 323 km/h (201 mph) due to a lower drag coefficient as compared to the GT3 RS. It also offers additional options including a lighter flywheel and removal of the air conditioning and audio systems. Production was limited to 991 examples, as a 2016 model.

=== 911 Turbo and Turbo S (2013–2016) ===
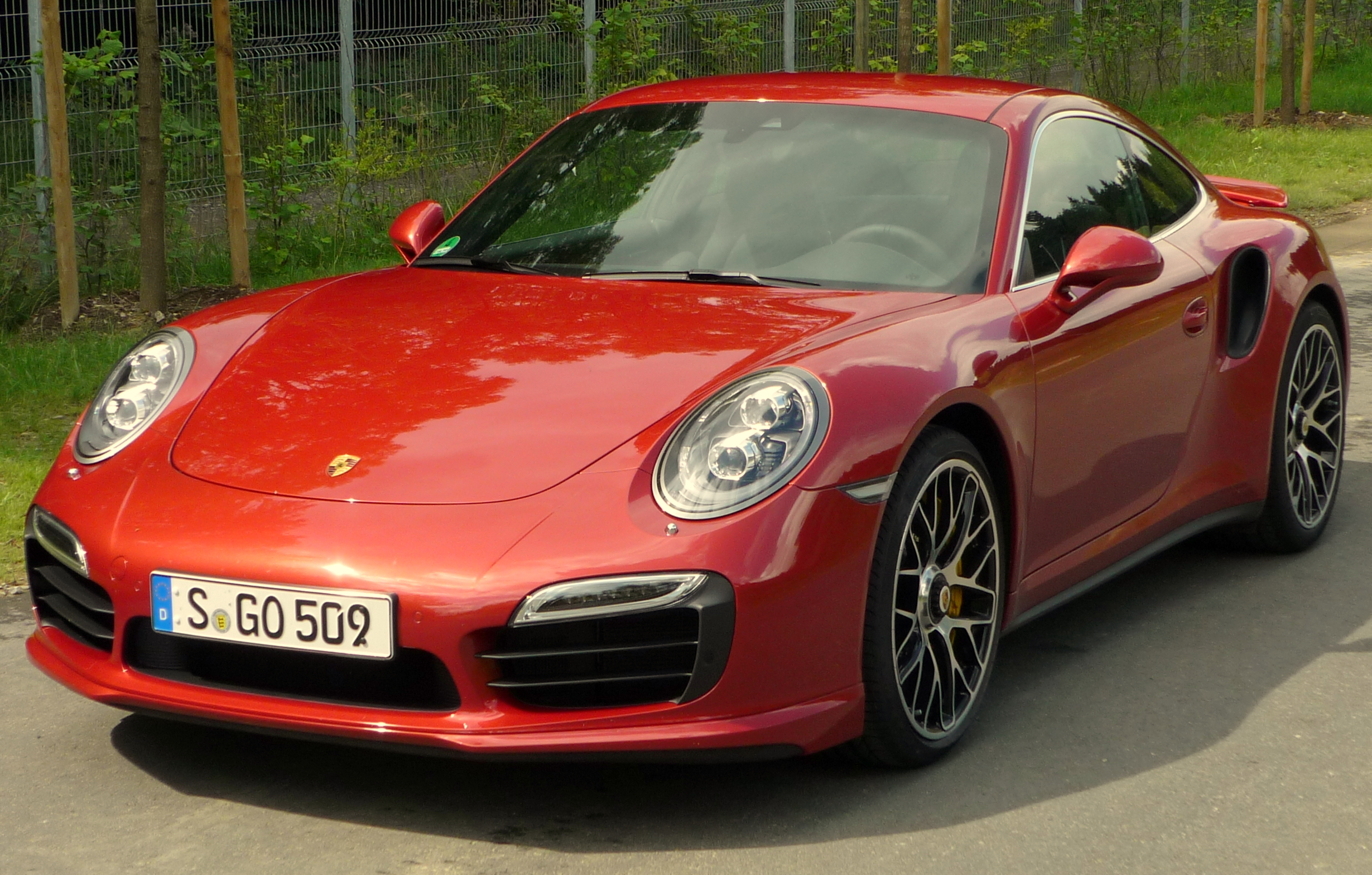
Porsche 911 Turbo S

Introduced in May 2013, the 991 Turbo has a twin-turbocharged 3.8-litre flat-6 engine generating 520 PS (382 kW; 513 hp) and 620 N⋅m (457 lb⋅ft) of torque. The S version has an upgraded version of the engine generating a maximum power output of 560 PS (412 kW; 552 hp) and 700 N⋅m (516 lb⋅ft) of torque, but the torque is pushed to 750 N⋅m (553 lb⋅ft) with overboost function. Both of the versions have all-wheel drive. The Turbo and Turbo S was available exclusively with 7-speed PDK. The Turbo S can reach 100 km/h (62 mph) in 2.9 seconds as claimed by Porsche but has achieved 2.6 seconds by many car magazine tests. New technologies featuring adaptive aerodynamics and rear wheel steering are included as standard.

The Turbo Cabriolet and the Turbo S Cabriolet were introduced in September 2013.

In 2014, to celebrate 40 years of Porsche Turbo, 911 Turbo S GB Edition was unveiled. The paintjob could only be done in GT Silver, White or Guards Red. It also features Porsche side stripe, black over silver 5-spoke rims and black side mirrors and rear wing. As the name says, this model was only sold in UK and just 40 examples were made.

Again in 2014, Porsche showed 911 Turbo S Pfaff Exclusive Edition. It was made to celebrate 50 years of Pfaff Automotive dealership in Toronto. The car features white exterior with black hood, white over black 5-spoke Fuchs rims and was limited to 5 units only for Canada.

=== Engines ===
Model	Engine (displacement)	Power	Torque
Carrera	3,436 cc (3.4 L) flat-six (97×77.5 mm)	350 PS (257 kW; 345 hp) at 7,400 rpm	390 N⋅m (288 lb⋅ft) at 5,600 rpm
Carrera S	3,799.6 cc (3.8 L) flat-six (102×77.5 mm)	400 PS (294 kW; 395 hp) at 7,400 rpm	440 N⋅m (325 lb⋅ft) at 5,600 rpm
Carrera GTS/S (Powerkit)	3,800 cc (3.8 L)	430 PS (316 kW; 424 hp) at 7,400 rpm	440 N⋅m (325 lb⋅ft) at 5,600 rpm
GT3	3,799 cc (3.8 L)	475 PS (349 kW; 469 hp) at 8,250 rpm	440 N⋅m (325 lb⋅ft) at 6,250 rpm
GT3 RS	3,996 cc (4.0 L) flat-six (102×81.5 mm)	500 PS (368 kW; 493 hp) at 8,250 rpm	460 N⋅m (339 lb⋅ft) at 6,250 rpm
911 R	3,996 cc (4.0 L)	500 PS (368 kW; 493 hp) at 8,250 rpm	460 N⋅m (339 lb⋅ft) at 6,250 rpm
Turbo	3,800 cc (3.8 L) twin-turbocharged flat-six (102×77.5 mm)	520 PS (382 kW; 513 hp) at 6,000 rpm	660 N⋅m (487 lb⋅ft) at 1,950 rpm (710 N⋅m (524 lb⋅ft) overboost)
Turbo S	3,800 cc (3.8 L) twin-turbocharged flat-six (102×77.5 mm)	560 PS (412 kW; 552 hp) at 6,500 rpm	700 N⋅m (516 lb⋅ft) at 2,100 rpm (750 N⋅m (553 lb⋅ft) overboost)

=== Performance ===
Model	Transmission	Top speed	Acceleration (0–100 km/h (62 mph))	Weight (DIN)	Emissions CO_{2} (NEDC)
Carrera	7-speed manual	289 km/h (180 mph)	4.8 seconds	1,380 kg (3,042 lb)	212 g/km
Carrera	7-speed PDK	287 km/h (178 mph)	4.6 seconds (SC: 4.4 seconds)	1,400 kg (3,086 lb)	194 g/km
Carrera Cabriolet	7-speed manual	286 km/h (178 mph)	5.0 seconds	1,450 kg (3,197 lb)	217 g/km
Carrera Cabriolet	7-speed PDK	284 km/h (176 mph)	4.8 seconds (SC: 4.6 seconds)	1,470 kg (3,241 lb)	198 g/km
Carrera S	7-speed manual	304 km/h (189 mph)	4.5 seconds	1,395 kg (3,075 lb)	224 g/km
Carrera S	7-speed PDK	302 km/h (188 mph)	4.3 seconds (SC: 4.1 seconds)	1,415 kg (3,120 lb)	205 g/km
Carrera S (Powerkit)	7-speed PDK	308 km/h (191 mph)	4.0 seconds	1,415 kg (3,120 lb)	205 g/km
Carrera S Cabriolet	7-speed manual	301 km/h (187 mph)	4.7 seconds	1,465 kg (3,230 lb)	229 g/km
Carrera S Cabriolet	7-speed PDK	299 km/h (186 mph)	4.5 seconds (SC: 4.3 seconds)	1,485 kg (3,274 lb)	210 g/km
Carrera 4	7-speed manual	285 km/h (177 mph)	4.9 seconds	1,430 kg (3,153 lb)	
Carrera 4	7-speed PDK	283 km/h (176 mph)	4.7 seconds (SC: 4.5 seconds)	1,450 kg (3,197 lb)	
Carrera 4 Cabriolet	7-speed manual	282 km/h (175 mph)	5.1 seconds	1,500 kg (3,307 lb)	
Carrera 4 Cabriolet	7-speed PDK	280 km/h (174 mph)	4.9 seconds (SC: 4.7 seconds)	1,520 kg (3,351 lb)	
Carrera 4S	7-speed manual	299 km/h (186 mph)	4.5 seconds	1,445 kg (3,186 lb)	
Carrera 4S	7-speed PDK	297 km/h (185 mph)	4.3 seconds (SC: 4.1 seconds)	1,465 kg (3,230 lb)	
Carrera 4S Cabriolet	7-speed manual	296 km/h (184 mph)	4.7 seconds	1,515 kg (3,340 lb)	
Carrera 4S Cabriolet	7-speed PDK	294 km/h (183 mph)	4.5 seconds (SC: 4.3 seconds)	1,535 kg (3,384 lb)	
Carrera GTS	7-speed manual	306 km/h (190 mph)	4.4 seconds	1,425 kg (3,142 lb)	
Carrera GTS	7-speed PDK	304 km/h (189 mph)	4.0 seconds	1,445 kg (3,186 lb)	
Carrera GTS Cabriolet	7-speed manual	304 km/h (189 mph)	4.6 seconds	1,495 kg (3,296 lb)	
Carrera GTS Cabriolet	7-speed PDK	302 km/h (188 mph)	4.2 seconds	1,515 kg (3,340 lb)	
Carrera 4 GTS	7-speed manual	304 km/h (189 mph)	4.4 seconds	1,470 kg (3,241 lb)	
Carrera 4 GTS	7-speed PDK	302 km/h (188 mph)	4.0 seconds	1,490 kg (3,285 lb)	
Carrera 4 GTS Cabriolet	7-speed manual	303 km/h (188 mph)	4.6 seconds	1,540 kg (3,395 lb)	
Carrera 4 GTS Cabriolet	7-speed PDK	301 km/h (187 mph)	4.2 seconds	1,560 kg (3,439 lb)	
Targa 4	7-speed manual	282 km/h (175 mph)	5.2 seconds	1,540 kg (3,395 lb)	223 g/km
Targa 4	7-speed PDK	280 km/h (174 mph)	5.0 seconds (SC: 4.8 seconds)	1,560 kg (3,439 lb)	204 g/km
Targa 4S	7-speed manual	296 km/h (184 mph)	4.8 seconds	1,555 kg (3,428 lb)	237 g/km
Targa 4S	7-speed PDK	294 km/h (183 mph)	4.6 seconds (SC: 4.4 seconds)	1,575 kg (3,472 lb)	214 g/km
Targa 4 GTS	7-speed manual	303 km/h (188 mph)	4.7 seconds	1,560 kg (3,439 lb)	
Targa 4 GTS	7-speed PDK	301 km/h (187 mph)	4.3 seconds	1,580 kg (3,483 lb)	
GT3	7-speed PDK	315 km/h (196 mph)	3.5 seconds	1,430 kg (3,153 lb)	289 g/km
GT3 RS	7-speed PDK	315 km/h (196 mph)	3.3 seconds	1,420 kg (3,131 lb)	296 g/km
911 R	6-speed manual	323 km/h (201 mph)	3.8 seconds	1,370 kg (3,020 lb)	308 g/km
Turbo	7-speed PDK	315 km/h (196 mph)	3.2 seconds (SC: 3.0 seconds)	1,595 kg (3,516 lb)	227 g/km
Turbo Cabriolet	7-speed PDK	315 km/h (196 mph)	3.3 seconds (SC: 3.1 seconds)	1,665 kg (3,671 lb)	227 g/km
Turbo S	7-speed PDK	318 km/h (198 mph)	2.9 seconds	1,600 kg (3,527 lb)	227 g/km
Turbo S Cabriolet	7-speed PDK	318 km/h (198 mph)	3.0 seconds	1,670 kg (3,682 lb)	227 g/km

PDK = Porsche Doppelkupplung (Dual Clutch Transmission)
SC = Sport Chrono

== Second phase (991.2; 2016–2019) ==
Following an introduction at the 2015 Frankfurt Motor Show, the 991 received a mid-cycle facelift for the 2016 model year. The updated Porsche 911 (at Porsche internally referred to as 991.2 or 991 II) introduced new styling including updated front and rear bumpers, new dual exhaust pipes along with new head and tail lights and options, along with all new, 3.0-litre twin-turbocharged flat-six engines across the range. This marked the first time the base 911 models had turbocharged engines.

=== 911 Carrera and Carrera S (2015–2019) ===
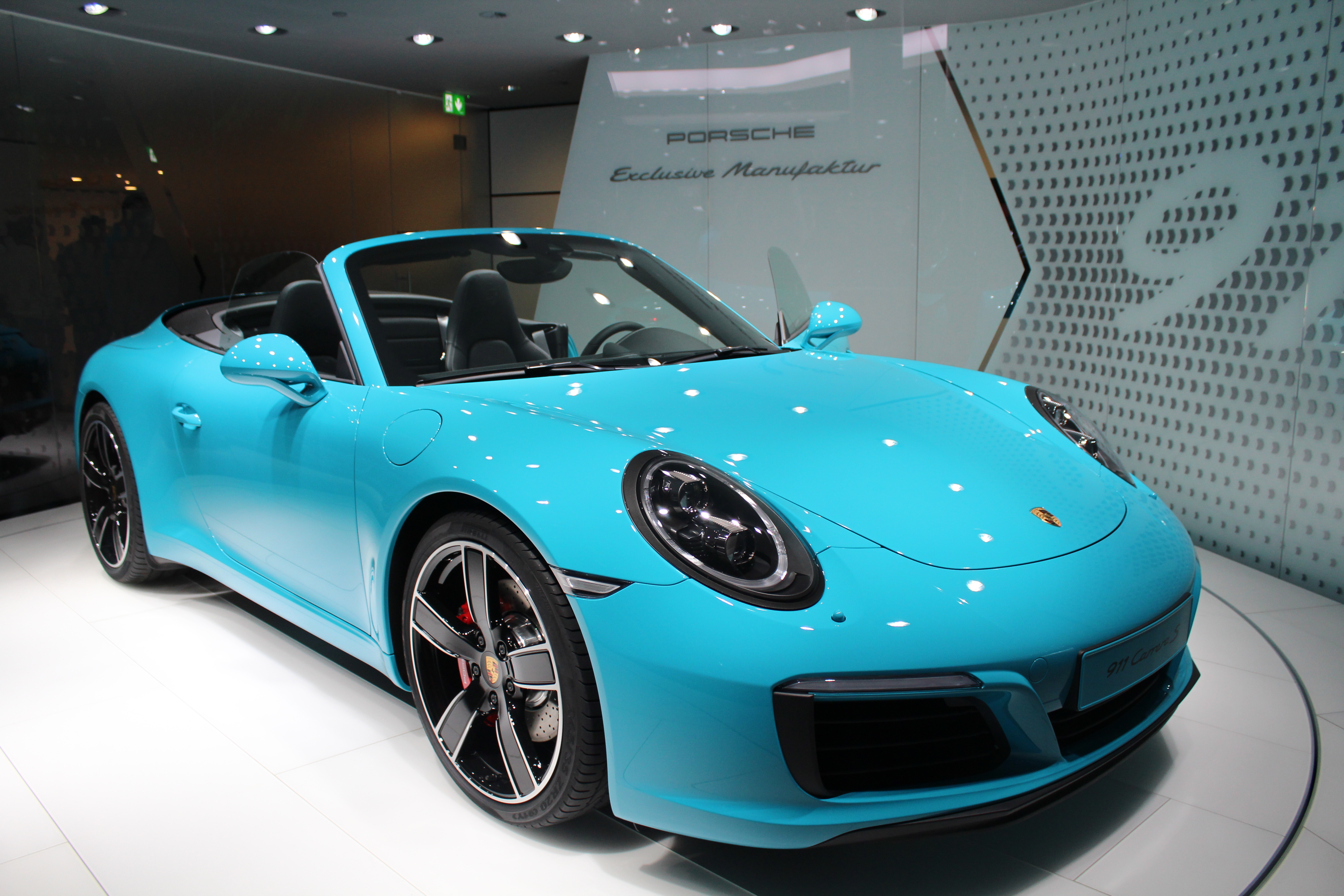
Porsche 991 Carrera Convertible

Initially from October 2015, available models were the coupé and cabriolet versions of Carrera and Carrera S.

The all-wheel drive versions Carrera 4 and 4S were unveiled in December 2015.

In 2016, Porsche unveiled 911 Carrera S Endurance Racing Edition to celebrate manufacturer's 18th win in Le Mans. The body could be done in White or Red, with black decals on sides, hood, roof and rear spoiler. Also car gets Sport exhaust system as standard. 235 cars were built.

In September 2018 Porsche decided to celebrate 15th anniversary of Carrera Cup Asia with 911 Carrera 15 Years Carrera Cup Asia Edition. It was based on base Carrera and was available in 2 colors - red and white. The car also had Carrera S rims and Sport exhaust system as standard and black decals on hood, roof, rear spoilers and sides. Porsche does not specify how many units were made.

=== 911 Carrera T (2017–2019) ===
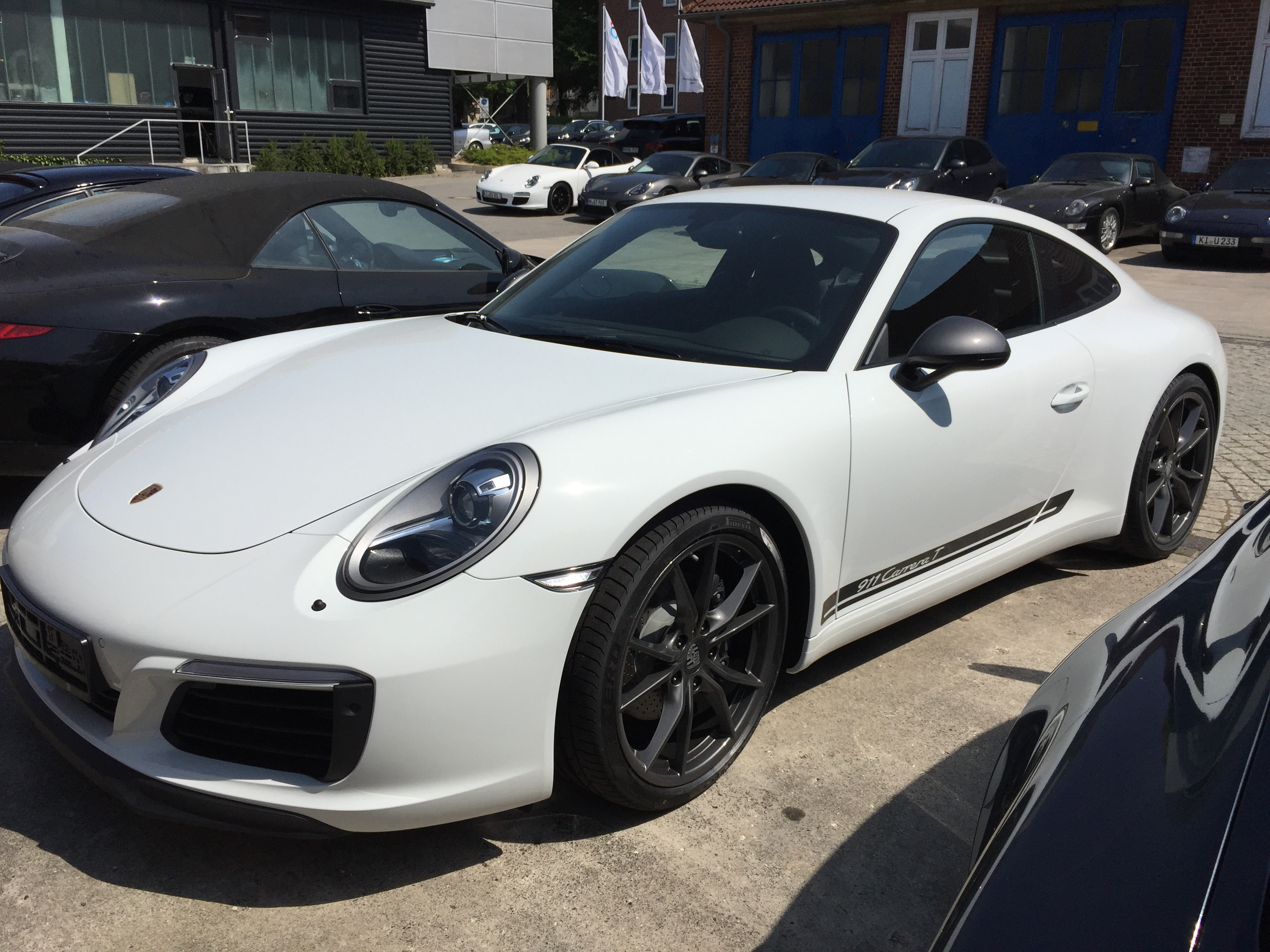
Porsche 911 Carrera T

In October 2017, Porsche announced the 911 Carrera T (Touring), offering the base Carrera drivetrain but with shorter rear axle ratio, mechanical differential lock, PASM and sports exhaust as standard together with Sport suspension lowered 20mm, weight optimised Sport Chrono package, exclusive to the Carrera T.

Additional features include a reduced sound insulation, light-weight glass side/rear windows, Sport-Tex seats, a shortened shift lever, deletion of the rear seats and communication system (with their re-addition available as a no-cost option), Carrera S wheels in Titan Grey, as well as optional rear-wheel steering, PDK transmission and bucket seats.

=== 911 Targa 4 and 4S (2016–2019) ===
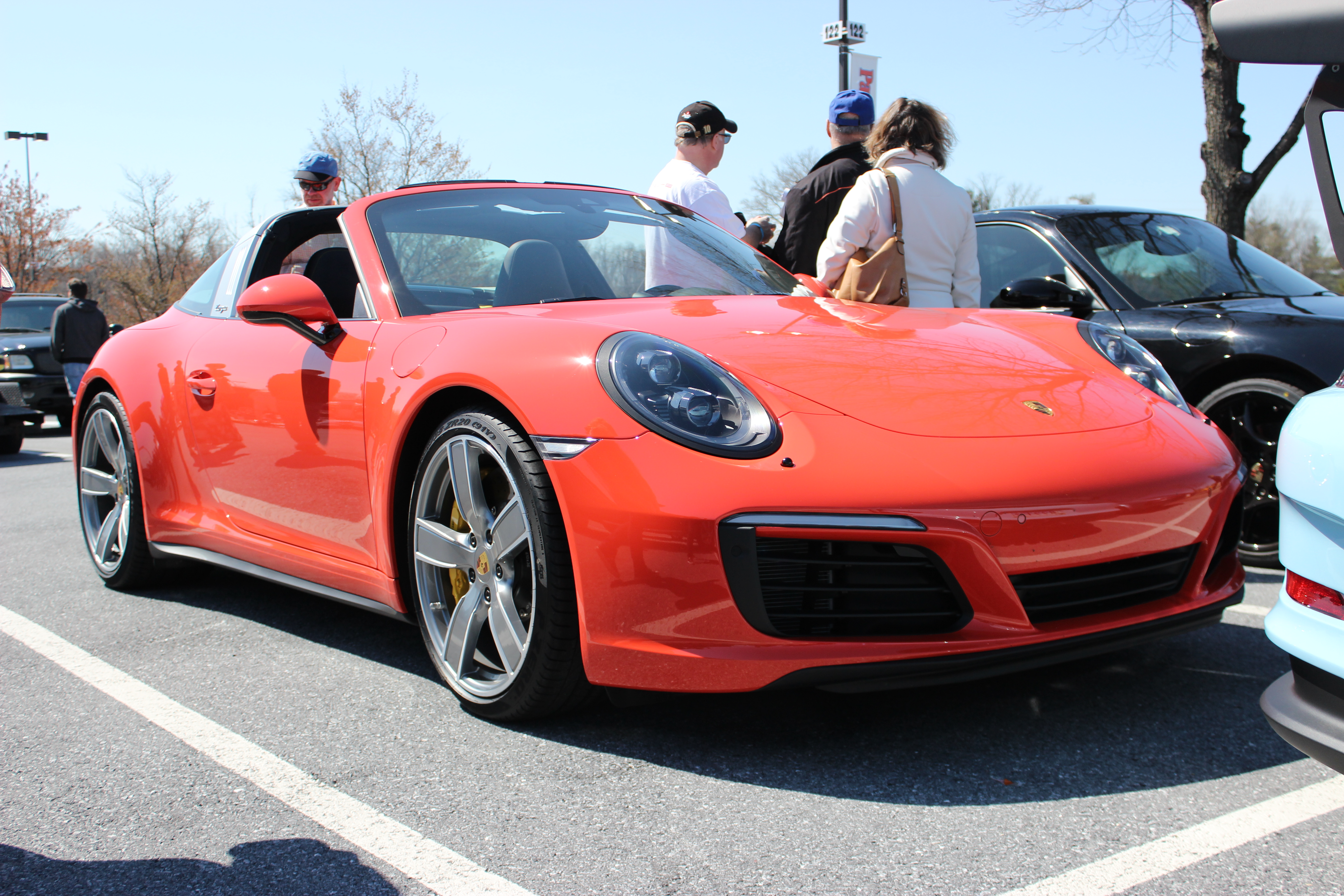
Porsche 911 (991.2) Targa 4S

The Targa 4 and 4S were unveiled in December 2015. The Targa 4S includes an upgraded 3.0-litre twin-turbocharged flat-6 engine generating a maximum power output of 420 PS (309 kW; 414 hp) and 499 N⋅m (368 lb⋅ft) of torque.

In August 2016 Porsche presented 911 Targa 4S Exclusive Design Edition. Its exterior is painted in Etna blue color, as a tribute to Porsche 356B, which had it as standard color. Also car features rims and accents in White Gold Metallic. Just 100 cars were produced worldwide.

In 2017 Porsche showed 911 Targa 4S Alex Edition that was made in collaboration of Dutch design firm Studio Piet Boon and Porsche Exclusive Manufaktur and pay homage to 911 G-Series' used by Dutch police in Hague, affectionately known as ‘Alex’ cars. All cars were made in Alex Grey color, featuring black rims and decals on doors and hood. The edition was limited to 25 cars.

=== 911 Carrera/Targa 4 GTS (2017–2019) ===
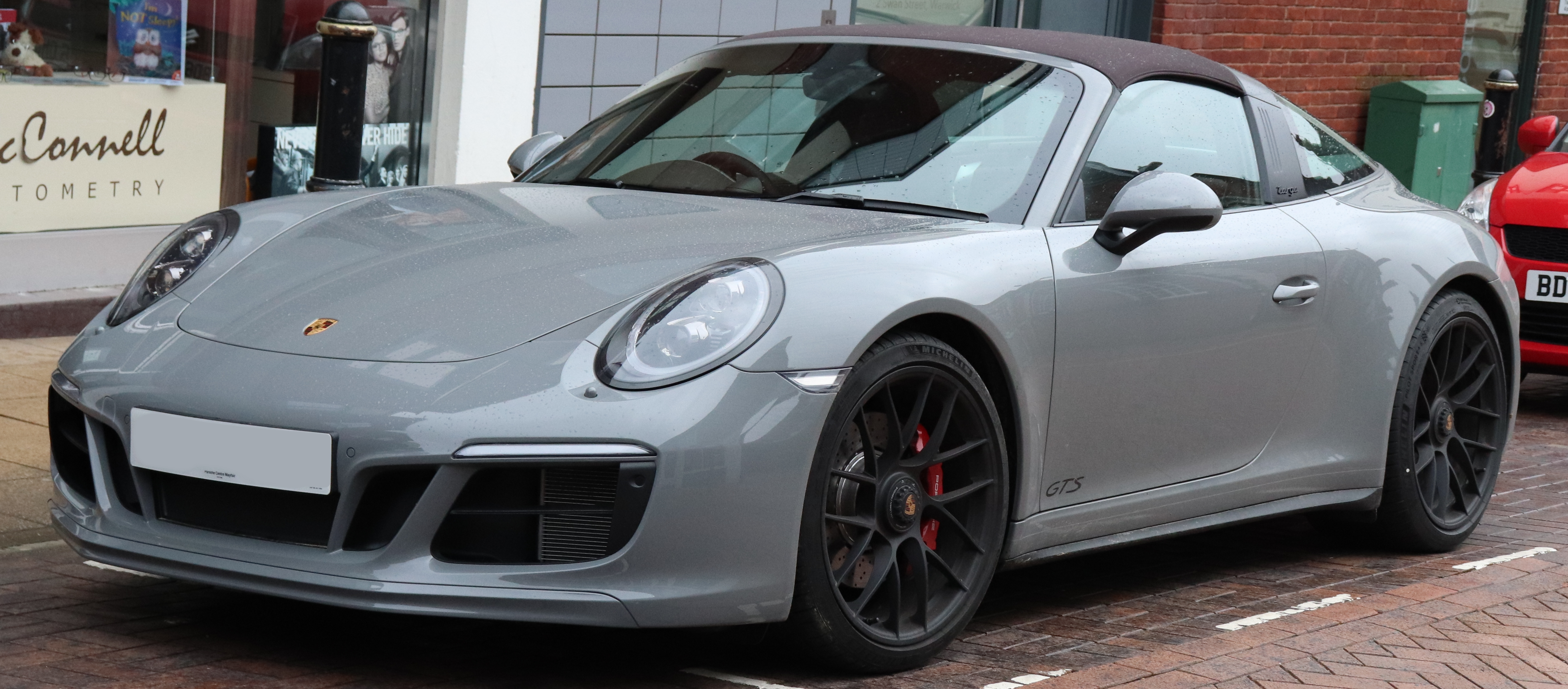
Porsche 911 Targa 4 GTS

In January 2017, five new GTS versions (RWD coupé and cabriolet as well as AWD coupé, cabriolet and Targa) were launched.

In October 2017, Porsche celebrated their 19th Le Mans win with 911 Carrera 4 GTS British Legends Edition. This edition could have 3 different trims, paying tribute to exact Porsche's Le Mans cars: 1 - Red paintjob with white stripes and number 23 on doors; 3 - Blue car with white, red and gold stripes and number 1; 3 - White car with black stripes and number 19 fitted in red square. All cars had black rims. An unknown number of cars was made.

In October 2018, Porsche showed 911 Targa 4 GTS Exclusive Manufaktur Edition developed for German market. The exterior is painted in Agate Grey color with White Gold Metallic and Brilliant Silver accents. RS Spyder rims come as standard, too. The interior is finished in brown leather with white stitching. No information about production numbers is available.

=== 911 GT3 and GT3 Touring Package (2017–2019) ===
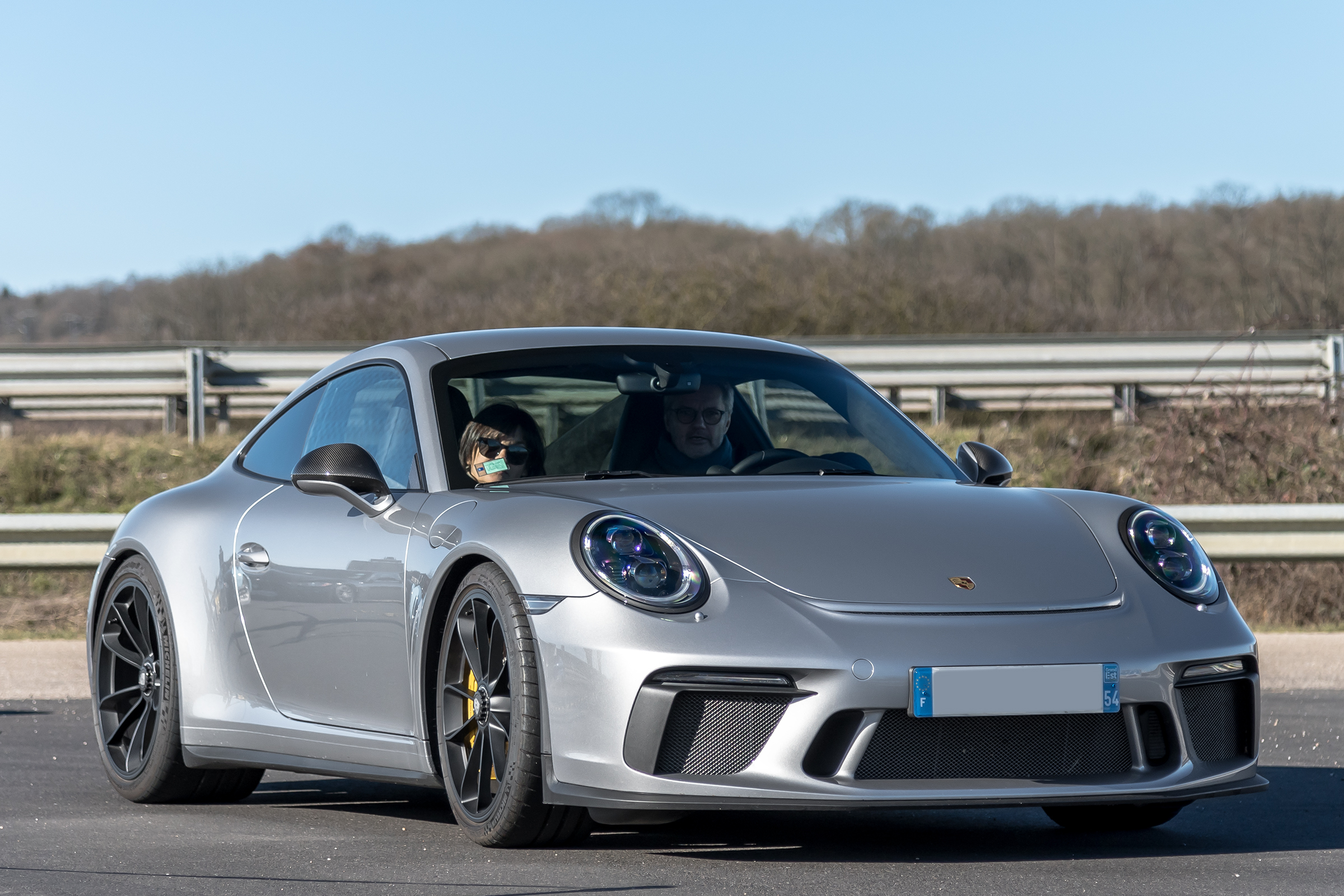
Porsche 911 GT3 Touring

The 2017 GT3 was unveiled at the 2017 Geneva Motor Show, and has a 4.0-litre flat-six engine, aerodynamic upgrades, and an optional 6-speed manual gearbox (absent on the 991.1-phase GT3). The 911 GT3 Touring followed in September 2017, with a manual transmission and without a fixed rear wing.

=== 911 GT3 RS (2018–2019) ===
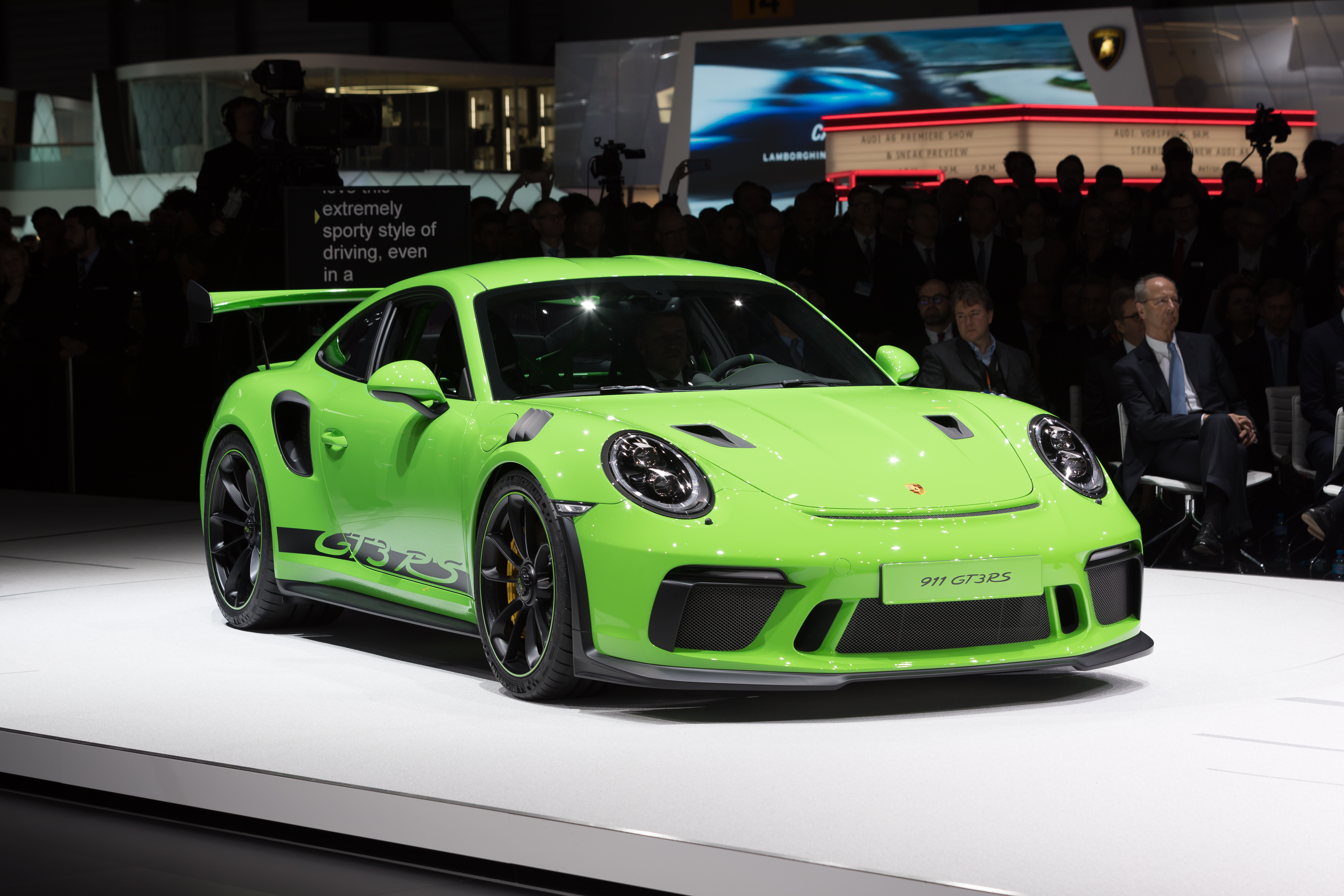
Porsche 911 GT3 RS

In February 2018, Porsche unveiled the new GT3 RS, available with optional Weissach package with the official unveiling taking place at the 2018 Geneva Motor Show.

=== 911 GT2 RS (2017–2019) ===
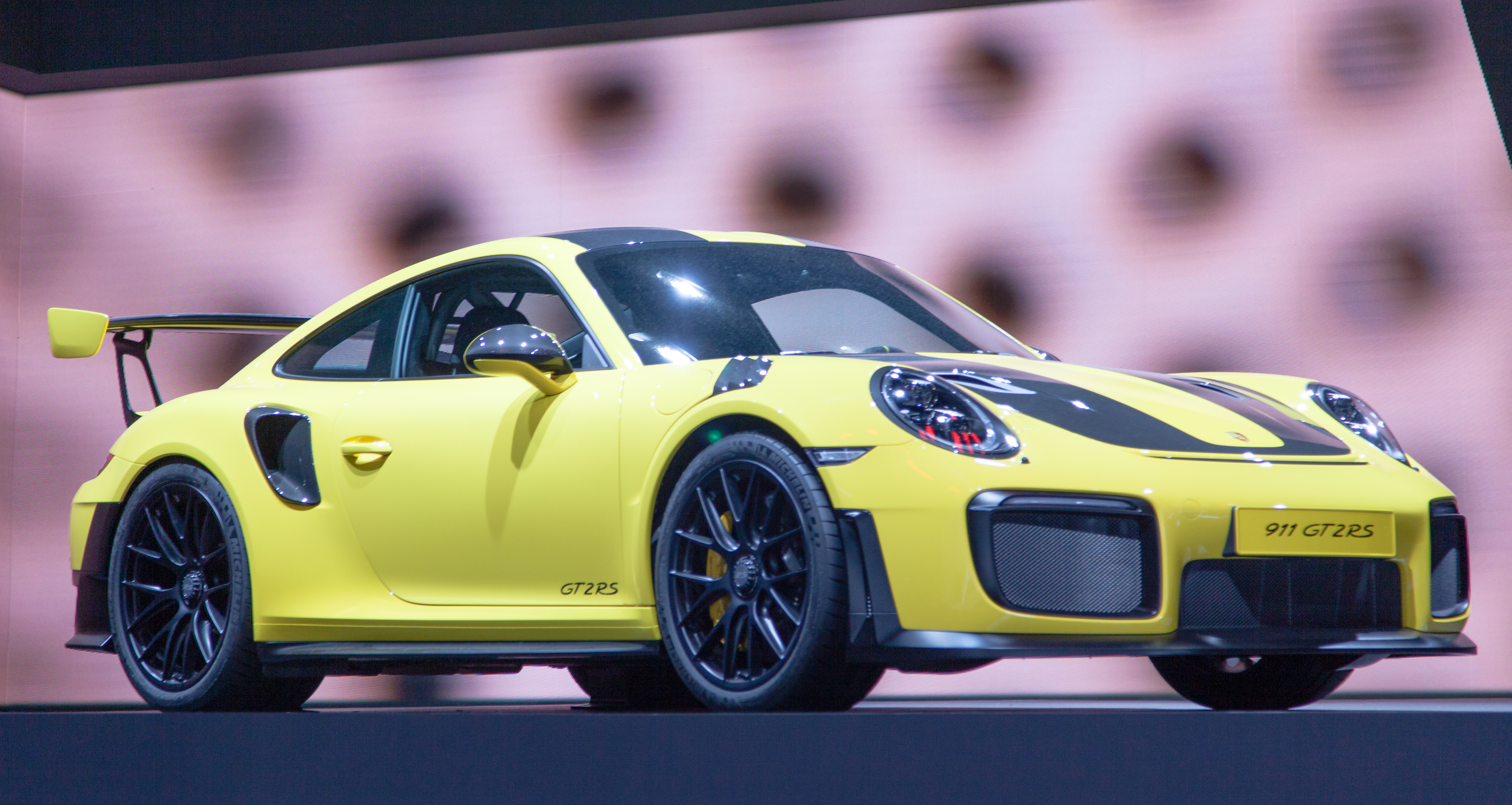
Porsche 911 GT2 RS

The 911 GT2 RS was officially launched by Porsche at the 2017 Goodwood Festival of Speed along with the introduction of the 911 Turbo S Exclusive Series. It is powered by a 3.8 L twin-turbocharged flat-6 engine generating a maximum power of 700 PS (515 kW; 690 hp) at 7,000 rpm and 750 N⋅m (553 lb⋅ft) of torque, giving the car a power to weight ratio of 2.1 kg (4.63 lb) per horsepower and making it the most powerful 911 ever built. A Weissach package option is available.

In late September 2017, the GT2 RS set a 6:47.3 lap time around the Nürburgring, which made it the fastest Porsche road car lap time recorded on the track at the time.

=== 911 Turbo, Turbo S and Turbo S Exclusive Series (2016–2019) ===
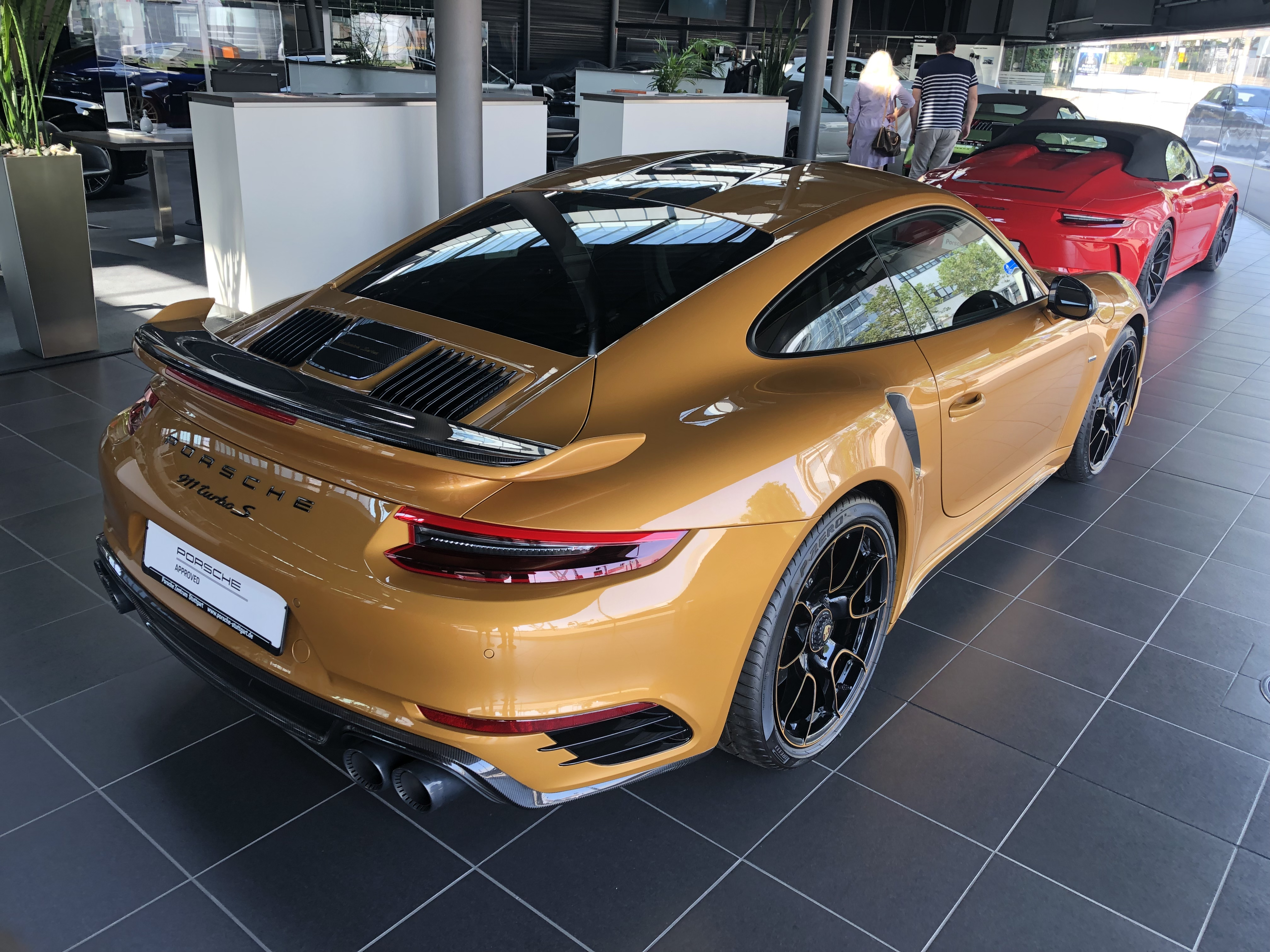
991.2 Turbo S Exclusive Series

In December 2015, Turbo and Turbo S versions were launched. In June 2017, the Turbo S Exclusive Series with powerkit and CFRP body panels was launched, limited to 500 units. Braided carbon-fibre wheels were available as option.

=== 935 (2019) ===
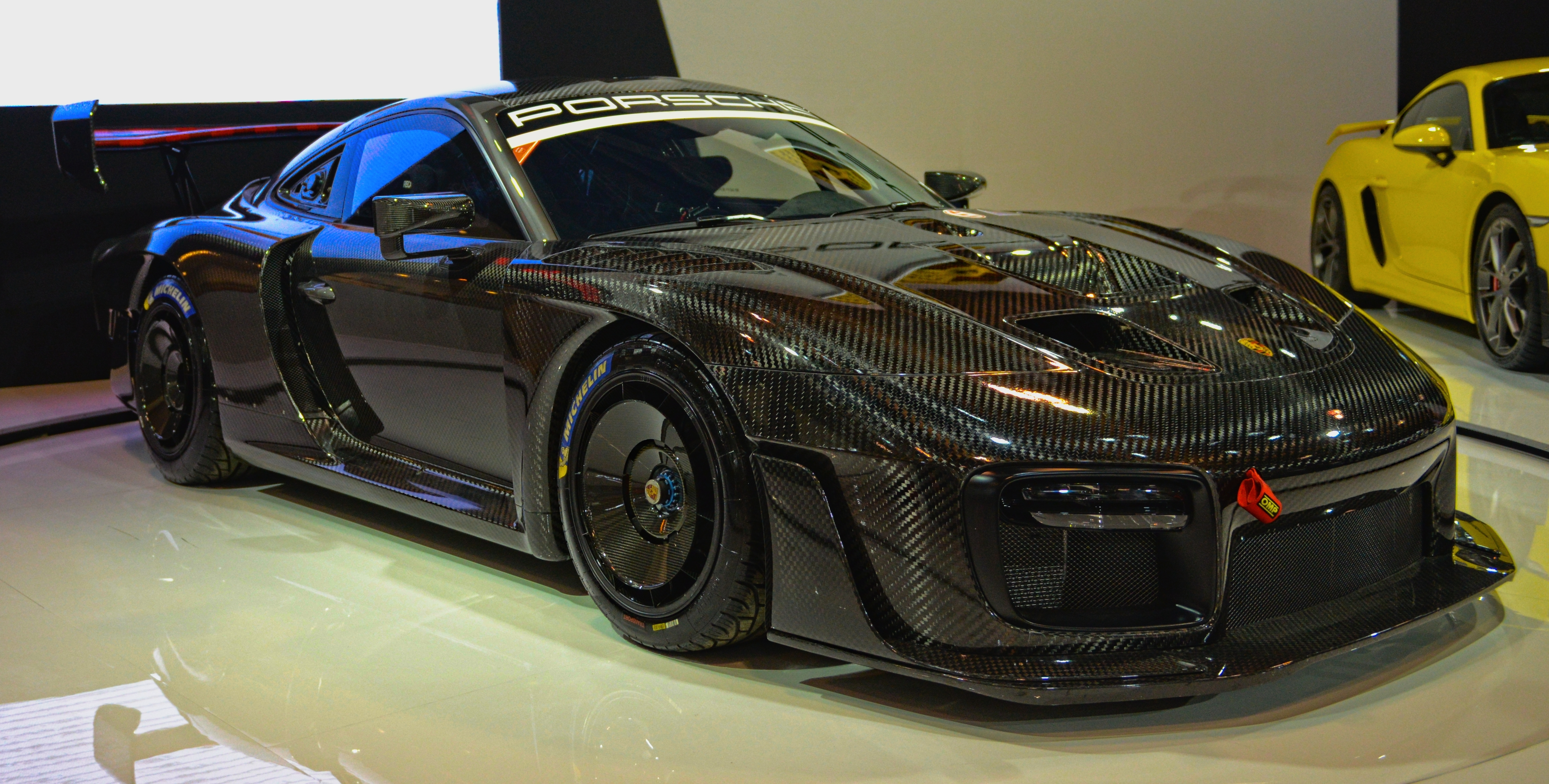
Porsche 935

At the Porsche Rennsport Reunion VI held in September 2018, Porsche unveiled a limited edition track-only special, paying homage to the legendary 935 race car. Based on the GT2 RS, the new 935 is designed to look like the 935/78, better known as the "Moby Dick" and features carbon fibre body work and an elongated "whale tail" rear section giving the car a total length of 4,865 mm (191.5 in) and width of 2,034 mm (80.1 in), making the car larger in terms of dimensions than the donor car. Wheelbase has been increased to 4,457 mm (175.5 in).

Other changes include a large 1,909 mm (75.2 in) wide and 400 mm (15.7 in) deep rear wing, LED headlights mounted in the lower air intakes beneath the "flatnose" front body work, "turbine aero" wheels, the carbon-fibre racing steering wheel from the 911 GT3 R, adjustable wing mirrors from the 911 RSR, a full roll-cage in the interior, a racing bucket seat from RECARO with six-point racing harness, a lightweight lithium-ion battery, a 115-litre FIA FT3-approved safety fuel cell with fuel cut-off safety valve, a fire extinguisher and an air jack system. With the changes and additions the car weighs in at a total of 1,380 kg (3,042 lb).

The 3.8-litre twin-turbocharged flat-six engine as used on the GT2 RS is untouched and generates 700 PS (515 kW; 690 hp). Power is sent to the rear wheels via a 7-speed dual clutch transmission with dual mass flywheel. The car retains ABS and Porsche Electronic Stability Management System including a full defeat mode. Unlike most racing cars air conditioning is standard-equipment. A passenger seat as well as a Martini sponsor-livery inspired by the original 935/78 are available as an option.

Production of the 935 was limited to 77 units with deliveries starting in June 2019.

=== 911 Speedster (2019) ===
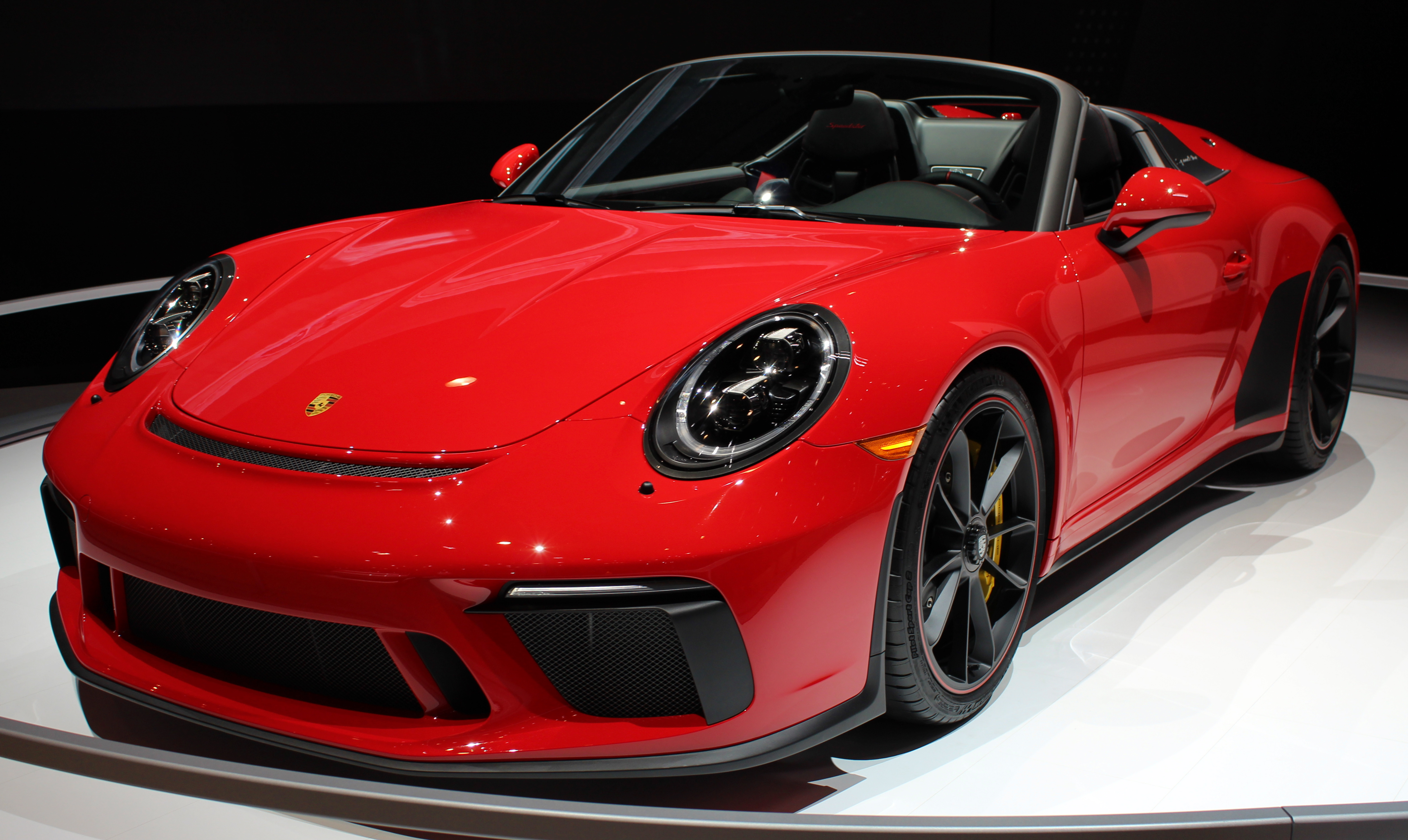

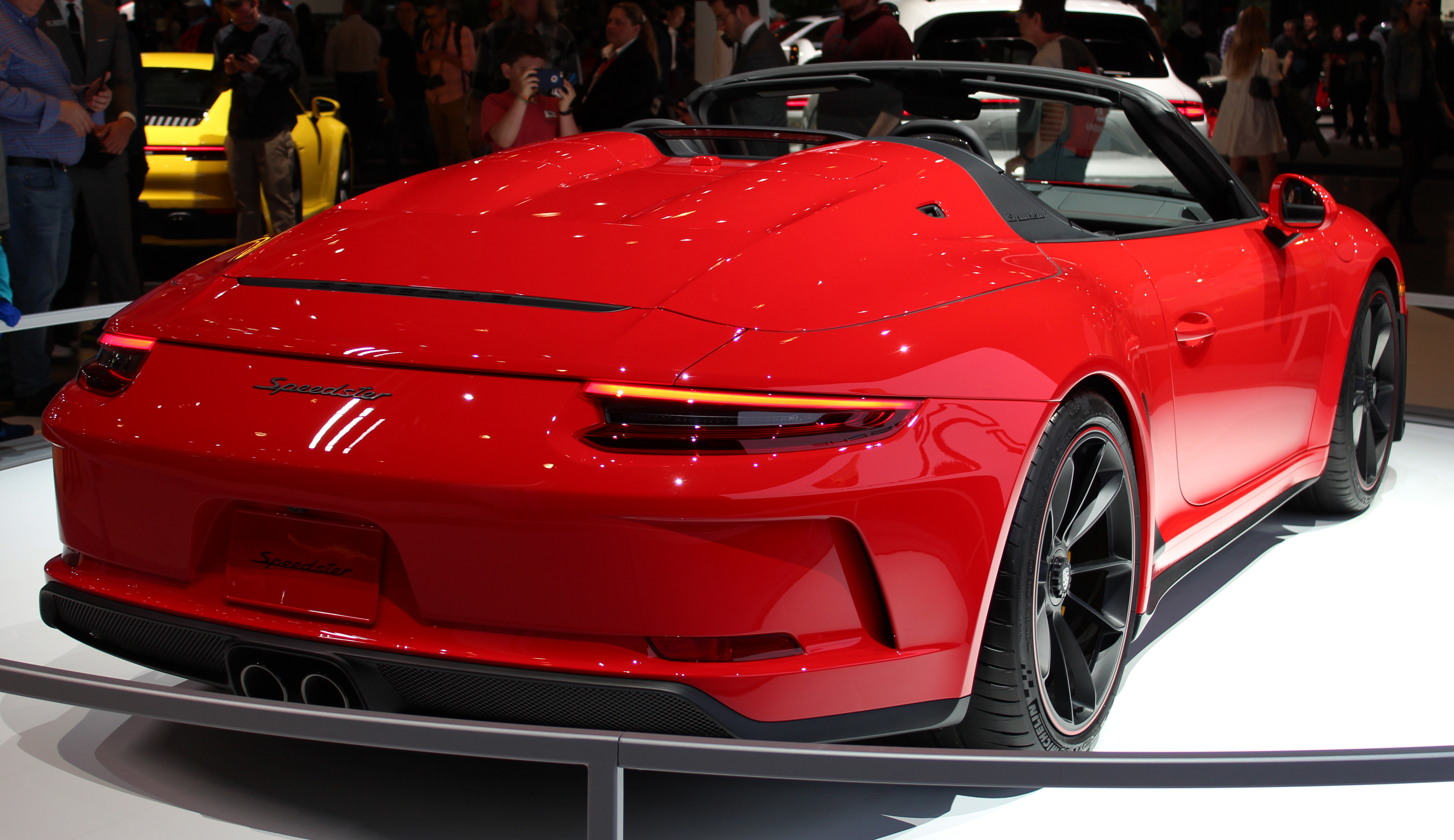
Porsche 911 Speedster

At the 2018 Paris Motor Show held in October on the occasion of the 70th anniversary celebration of the marque, Porsche unveiled the Speedster variant of the 991 generation for the 911, as a concept. Utilising the chassis of the GT3 and the body shell of the Carrera 4 Cabriolet, the Speedster sports a 4.0-litre naturally aspirated flat-six engine with a maximum power output of 500 PS (368 kW; 493 hp) and a red-line of 9,000 rpm coupled with a 6-speed manual transmission, which is claimed to be 4 kg (9 lb) lighter than the 7-speed manual transmission found on the standard 991 models, and a titanium exhaust system.

The car also features the signature "hump" shaped double bubble roof cover along with a shorter windshield frame, side window glass and the analogue roof folding mechanism retaining the "Talbot" wing mirrors and the central fuel cap from the 911 Speedster concept unveiled earlier at the Goodwood Festival of Speed harking back to its use on the 356 Speedster. Other highlights include a leather interior with perforated seats, red tinted daytime running lights, carbon fibre fenders, engine cover and hood and stone guards. Production will begin in the first half of 2019 and be limited to 1,948 units in honour of the year in which the 356 "Number 1" gained its operating license.

The final production version of the Speedster was unveiled at the 2019 New York Auto Show in April and dropped the "Talbot" wing mirrors in favour of standard 991 wing mirrors and announced to be available for sale in May 2019. The engine adopted from the GT3 is equipped with individual throttle bodies and a new fuel injection system and develops 510 PS (375 kW; 503 hp) at 8,400 rpm and 470 N⋅m (347 lb⋅ft) at 6,250 rpm. The exhaust system is claimed to be 10 kg (22 lb) lighter despite the addition of two petrol particle filters. The car is equipped with carbon-ceramic brakes (PCCB) as standard, a Heritage Design Package is available as option.

The Speedster was also the final edition of the 991, with only 1,948 units produced. Production of the 991 generation ended on 20 December 2019, and the final 991 model was a 991 Speedster. Porsche made 233,540 991s worldwide.

The last unit of the Speedster was auctioned off in April 2020.

=== Engines ===
Model	Engine (displacement)	Power	Torque
Carrera, Carrera T, Targa	2,981 cc (3.0 L)	370 PS (272 kW; 365 hp) at 6,500 rpm	450 N⋅m (332 lb⋅ft) at 1,700 – 5,000 rpm
Carrera S, Targa S	2,981 cc (3.0 L)	420 PS (309 kW; 414 hp) at 6,500 rpm	500 N⋅m (369 lb⋅ft) at 1,700 – 5,000 rpm
Carrera GTS, Targa GTS	2,981 cc (3.0 L)	450 PS (331 kW; 444 hp) at 6,500 rpm	550 N⋅m (406 lb⋅ft) at 2,150 – 5,000 rpm
GT3	3,996 cc (4.0 L)	500 PS (368 kW; 493 hp) at 8,250 rpm	460 N⋅m (339 lb⋅ft) at 6,000 rpm
Speedster	3,996 cc (4.0 L)	510 PS (375 kW; 503 hp) at 8,400 rpm	470 N⋅m (347 lb⋅ft) at 6,250 rpm
GT3 RS	3,996 cc (4.0 L)	520 PS (382 kW; 513 hp) at 8,250 rpm	470 N⋅m (347 lb⋅ft) at 6,000 rpm
Turbo	3,800 cc (3.8 L)	540 PS (397 kW; 533 hp) at 6,400 rpm	660 N⋅m (487 lb⋅ft) at 1,950 – 5,000 rpm (710 N⋅m (524 lb⋅ft) overboost)
Turbo S	3,800 cc (3.8 L)	580 PS (427 kW; 572 hp) at 6,750 rpm	700 N⋅m (516 lb⋅ft) at 2,100 – 4,250 rpm (750 N⋅m (553 lb⋅ft) overboost)
Turbo S Exclusive Series	3,800 cc (3.8 L)	607 PS (446 kW; 599 hp) at 6,750 rpm	750 N⋅m (553 lb⋅ft) at 2,250 – 4,000 rpm
GT2 RS, GT2 RS Clubsport, 935	3,800 cc (3.8 L)	700 PS (515 kW; 690 hp) at 7,000 rpm	750 N⋅m (553 lb⋅ft) at 2,500 – 4,500 rpm

=== Performance ===
Model	Transmission	Top speed	Acceleration (0–100 km/h (62 mph))	Weight (DIN)	Emissions CO_{2} (NEDC)
Carrera	7-speed manual	295 km/h (183 mph)	4.6 seconds	1,430 kg (3,153 lb)	190 g/km
Carrera	7-speed PDK	293 km/h (182 mph)	4.4 seconds (SC: 4.2 seconds)	1,450 kg (3,197 lb)	169 g/km
Carrera Cabriolet	7-speed manual	292 km/h (181 mph)	4.8 seconds	1,500 kg (3,307 lb)	195 g/km
Carrera Cabriolet	7-speed PDK	290 km/h (180 mph)	4.6 seconds (SC: 4.4 seconds)	1,520 kg (3,351 lb)	172 g/km
Carrera T	7-speed manual	293 km/h (182 mph)	4.5 seconds	1,425 kg (3,142 lb)	215 g/km
Carrera T	7-speed PDK	291 km/h (181 mph)	4.2 seconds	1,445 kg (3,186 lb)	193 g/km
Carrera S	7-speed manual	308 km/h (191 mph)	4.3 seconds	1,440 kg (3,175 lb)	199 g/km
Carrera S	7-speed PDK	306 km/h (190 mph)	4.1 seconds (SC: 3.9 seconds)	1,460 kg (3,219 lb)	174 g/km
Carrera S Cabriolet	7-speed manual	306 km/h (190 mph)	4.5 seconds	1,510 kg (3,329 lb)	202 g/km
Carrera S Cabriolet	7-speed PDK	304 km/h (189 mph)	4.3 seconds (SC: 4.1 seconds)	1,530 kg (3,373 lb)	178 g/km
Carrera 4	7-speed manual	292 km/h (181 mph)	4.5 seconds	1,480 kg (3,263 lb)	201 g/km
Carrera 4	7-speed PDK	290 km/h (180 mph)	4.3 seconds (SC: 4.1 seconds)	1,500 kg (3,307 lb)	177 g/km
Carrera 4 Cabriolet	7-speed manual	289 km/h (180 mph)	4.7 seconds	1,550 kg (3,417 lb)	206 g/km
Carrera 4 Cabriolet	7-speed PDK	287 km/h (178 mph)	4.5 seconds (SC: 4.3 seconds)	1,570 kg (3,461 lb)	182 g/km
Carrera 4S	7-speed manual	305 km/h (190 mph)	4.2 seconds	1,490 kg (3,285 lb)	204 g/km
Carrera 4S	7-speed PDK	303 km/h (188 mph)	4.0 seconds (SC: 3.8 seconds)	1,510 kg (3,329 lb)	180 g/km
Carrera 4S Cabriolet	7-speed manual	303 km/h (188 mph)	4.4 seconds	1,560 kg (3,439 lb)	208 g/km
Carrera 4S Cabriolet	7-speed PDK	301 km/h (187 mph)	4.2 seconds (SC: 4.0 seconds)	1,580 kg (3,483 lb)	184 g/km
Carrera GTS	7-speed manual	312 km/h (194 mph)	4.1 seconds	1,450 kg (3,197 lb)	212 g/km
Carrera GTS	7-speed PDK	310 km/h (193 mph)	3.7 seconds	1,470 kg (3,241 lb)	188 g/km
Carrera GTS Cabriolet	7-speed manual	310 km/h (193 mph)	4.2 seconds	1,520 kg (3,351 lb)	214 g/km
Carrera GTS Cabriolet	7-speed PDK	308 km/h (191 mph)	3.8 seconds	1,540 kg (3,395 lb)	190 g/km
Carrera 4 GTS	7-speed manual	310 km/h (193 mph)	4.0 seconds	1,495 kg (3,296 lb)	216 g/km
Carrera 4 GTS	7-speed PDK	308 km/h (191 mph)	3.6 seconds	1,515 kg (3,340 lb)	192 g/km
Carrera 4 GTS Cabriolet	7-speed manual	308 km/h (191 mph)	4.1 seconds	1,565 kg (3,450 lb)	220 g/km
Carrera 4 GTS Cabriolet	7-speed PDK	306 km/h (190 mph)	3.7 seconds	1,585 kg (3,494 lb)	196 g/km
Targa 4	7-speed manual	289 km/h (180 mph)	4.7 seconds	1,570 kg (3,461 lb)	206 g/km
Targa 4	7-speed PDK	287 km/h (178 mph)	4.5 seconds (SC: 4.3 seconds)	1,590 kg (3,505 lb)	182 g/km
Targa 4S	7-speed manual	303 km/h (188 mph)	4.4 seconds	1,580 kg (3,483 lb)	208 g/km
Targa 4S	7-speed PDK	301 km/h (187 mph)	4.2 seconds (SC: 4.0 seconds)	1,600 kg (3,527 lb)	184 g/km
Targa 4 GTS	7-speed manual	308 km/h (191 mph)	4.1 seconds	1,585 kg (3,494 lb)	220 g/km
Targa 4 GTS	7-speed PDK	306 km/h (190 mph)	3.7 seconds	1,605 kg (3,538 lb)	196 g/km
GT3 Touring	6-speed manual	316 km/h (196 mph)	3.9 seconds	1,413 kg (3,115 lb)	302 g/km
GT3	6-speed manual	320 km/h (199 mph)	3.9 seconds	1,413 kg (3,115 lb)	290 g/km
GT3	7-speed PDK	318 km/h (198 mph)	3.4 seconds	1,430 kg (3,153 lb)	288 g/km
GT3 RS	7-speed PDK	312 km/h (194 mph)	3.2 seconds	1,430 kg (3,153 lb)	291 g/km
Speedster	6-speed manual	310 km/h (193 mph)	4.0 seconds	1,465 kg (3,230 lb)	317 g/km
Turbo	7-speed PDK	320 km/h (199 mph)	2.9 seconds	1,595 kg (3,516 lb)	212 g/km
Turbo Cabriolet	7-speed PDK	320 km/h (199 mph)	3.0 seconds	1,665 kg (3,671 lb)	216 g/km
Turbo S	7-speed PDK	330 km/h (205 mph)	2.8 seconds	1,600 kg (3,527 lb)	212 g/km
Turbo S Cabriolet	7-speed PDK	330 km/h (205 mph)	2.9 seconds	1,670 kg (3,682 lb)	216 g/km
Turbo S Exclusive Series	7-speed PDK	330 km/h (205 mph)	2.7 seconds	1,600 kg (3,527 lb)	212 g/km
GT2 RS	7-speed PDK	340 km/h (211 mph)	2.7 seconds	1,470 kg (3,241 lb)	269 g/km

SC = Sport Chrono

=== Marketing ===
Porsche Design 911 Soundbar Final Edition, a series of 50 speakers that uses the exhaust system of 991 series of 911 GT3, was sold via local Porsche Centre.

== Awards ==
The Porsche 991 was titled World Performance Car 2012 shortly after famed Porsche designer Ferdinand Alexander Porsche died. The GT3 was awarded the title of World Performance Car Of The Year in 2014.
