= Ruf Turbo R =

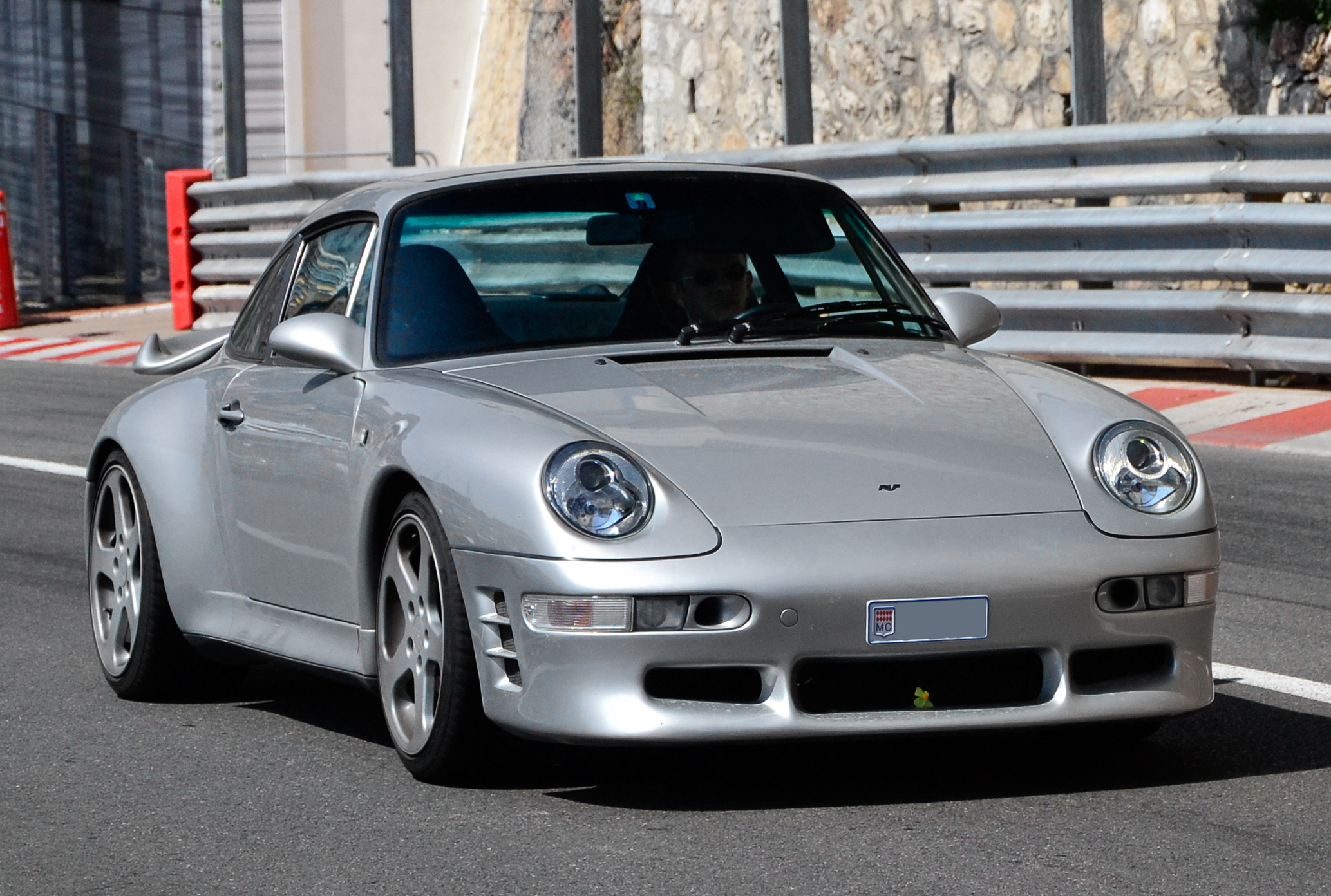

Overview
- Manufacturer: Ruf Automobile
- Also called: Ruf TurboR
- Production: 1998

Body and chassis
- Class: Sports car (S)
- Layout: Rear-engine, all-wheel drive
- Platform: Porsche 911 (993)

Powertrain
- Engine: 3.6L twin-turbocharged M64 SOHC flat-6
- Transmission: 6-speed manual

Chronology
- Predecessor: Ruf CTR2

The Ruf Turbo R, sometimes stylized as TurboR, is a sports car built by Ruf Automobile of Germany. It is based on the 993 generation Porsche 911 Turbo. It was introduced in 1998 after the discontinuation of the CTR2 (another 993 generation based car), since Ruf still wanted a supercar offering to be available, and so the Turbo R became the supercar offering from Ruf for the 1998 model year only. After 1998, Ruf continued to offer both partial and full Turbo R conversions for existing 911s well into the 2000s, but those cars retained the original Porsche VINs.

== Specifications ==
The Turbo R is powered by the twin-turbocharged 3.6 L (3,600 cc) flat-six engine from the Porsche 993 Turbo, reworked by Ruf to produce 490 hp (365 kW) at 5500 rpm and 650 N⋅m (479 lbf⋅ft) of torque at 4500 rpm. Computer-controlled all-wheel drive is standard and power is sent to the wheels through a 6-speed manual transmission. The suspension was modified with firmer springs and larger anti-roll bars to accommodate the extra power and the brakes were reworked by Ruf as well. On the exterior the Turbo R is differentiated by a Ruf body kit, 18 inch wheels, aero mirrors and removed rain gutters. In the interior, the same integrated roll cage from the CTR2 and the lightweight interior from the BTR were both offered as options. These modifications allowed the Turbo R to accelerate from 0–100 km/h (62 mph) in 3.6 seconds, 0–200 km/h (124 mph) in 11.8 seconds and reach a top speed of 329 km/h (204 mph).

== Turbo R Limited ==
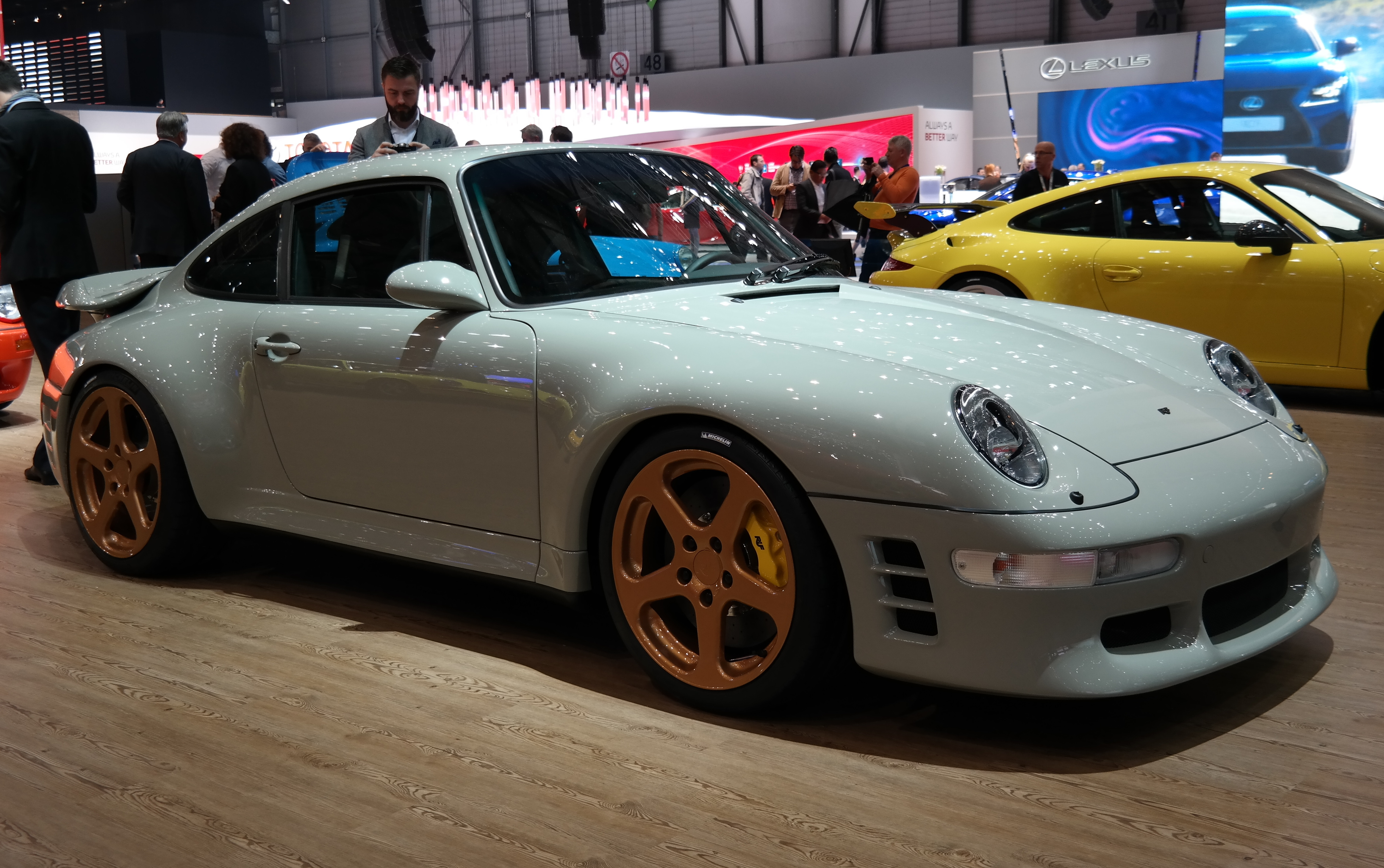
Turbo R Limited at the 2016 Geneva Motor Show

In 2016, Ruf introduced the Turbo R Limited, a tribute to the original Turbo R, Production was limited to seven units, all of which sold, with prices starting at slightly under US$600,000. The Limited uses the same twin-turbocharged 3.6L H6 sending power through a 6-speed manual transmission, but power has been increased to 620 hp (462 kW) at 6800 rpm and 553 lb⋅ft (750 N⋅m) of torque at 4500 rpm. Unlike the original, the Limited comes standard with rear-wheel drive, with all-wheel drive offered as an option. Ruf's official website reports the Limited's top speed as 341 km/h (212 mph), however they also state the top speed is "like its predecessor" suggesting the 10 mph difference between the two numbers may be a typo. Curb weight of the Limited is 3,175 lb (1,440 kg).
