= Ruf CTR2 =

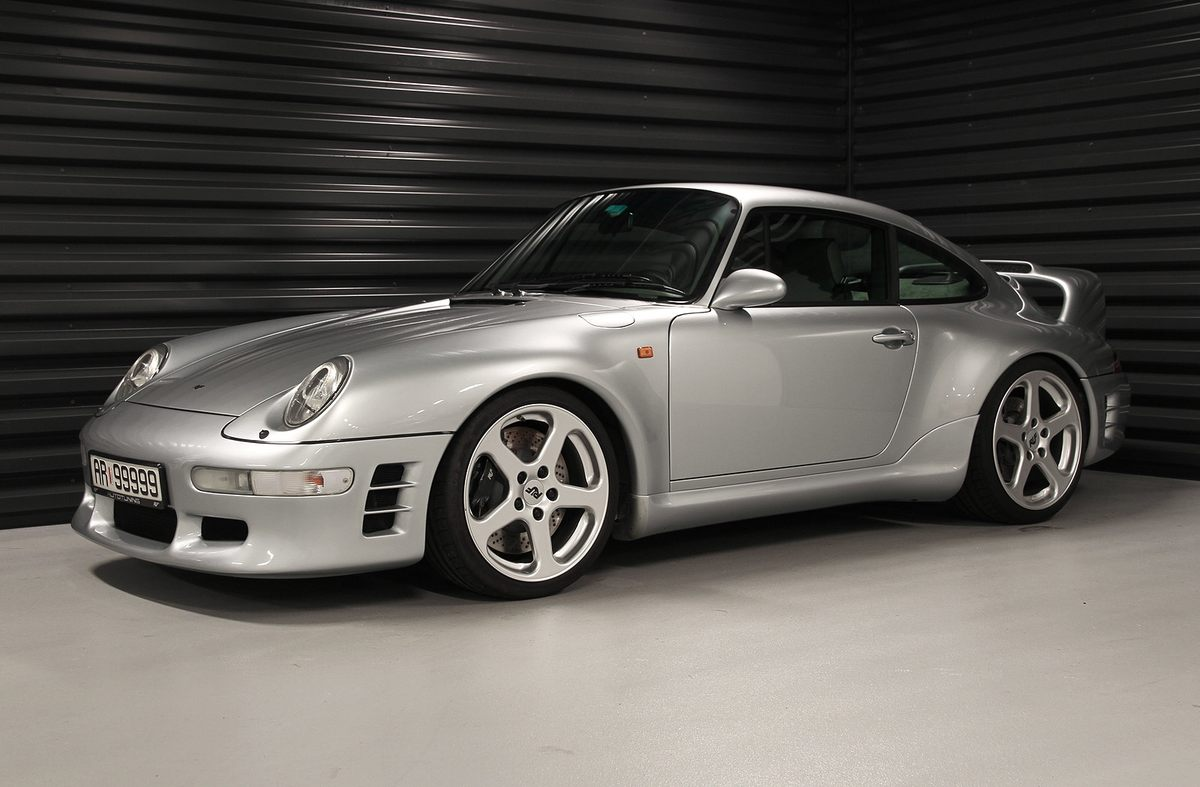

Overview
- Manufacturer: Ruf
- Production: 1995–1997
- Assembly: Pfaffenhausen, Germany

Body and chassis
- Class: Sports car (S)
- Body style: 2-door coupé
- Layout: Rear-engine, all-wheel drive / rear-wheel drive
- Related: Porsche 911 (993)

Powertrain
- Engine: 3.6 litres (220 cu in) air-cooled twin-turbocharged Single-cam flat-6
- Transmission: 6-speed manual

Dimensions
- Wheelbase: 2,271 mm (89.4 in)
- Length: 4,290 mm (169 in)
- Width: 1,735 mm (68.3 in)
- Height: 1,300 mm (51 in)
- Curb weight: 1,358 kg (2,994 lb)

Chronology
- Predecessor: Ruf CTR
- Successor: Ruf Turbo R Ruf CTR3

The Ruf CTR2 (Group C, Turbo Ruf, 2nd generation) is a 2-door sports car built by German automobile manufacturer Ruf Automobile from 1995 to 1997 as the successor to the CTR Yellowbird, but based on Porsche's Type 993 generation 911.

== History ==
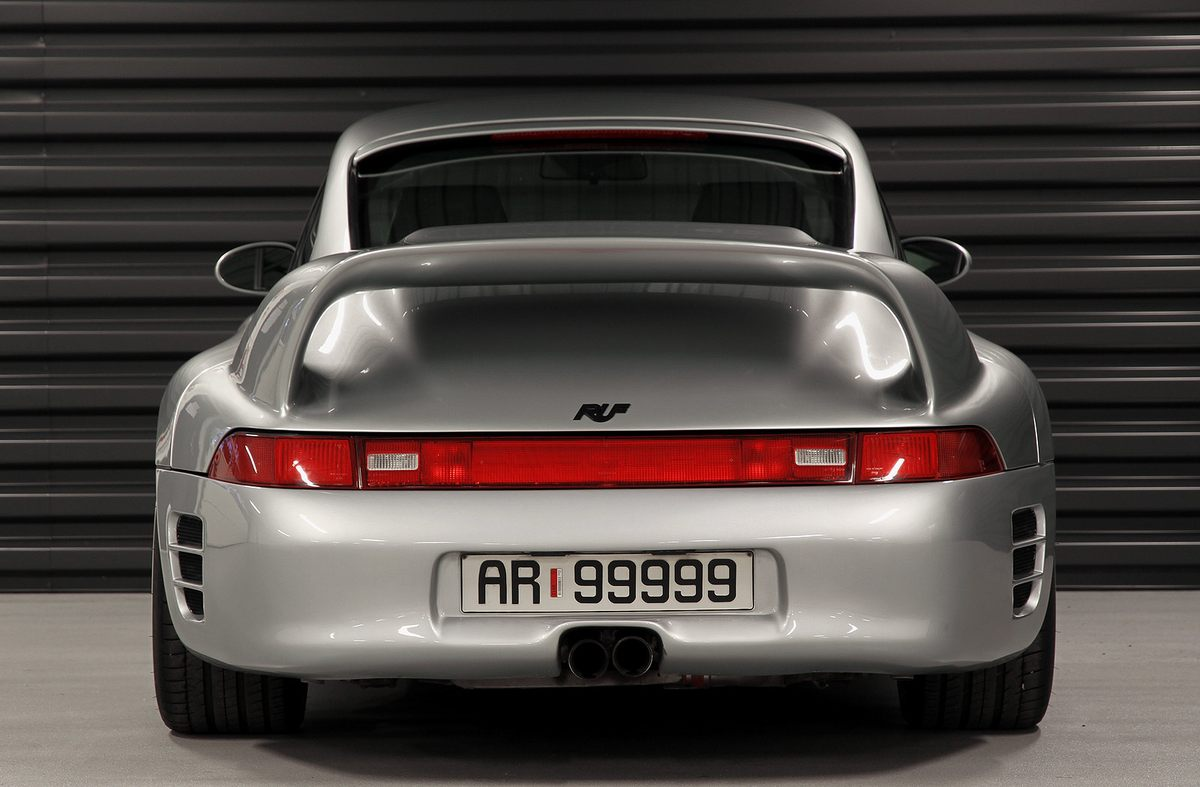
Rear view showing the bi-functional wing

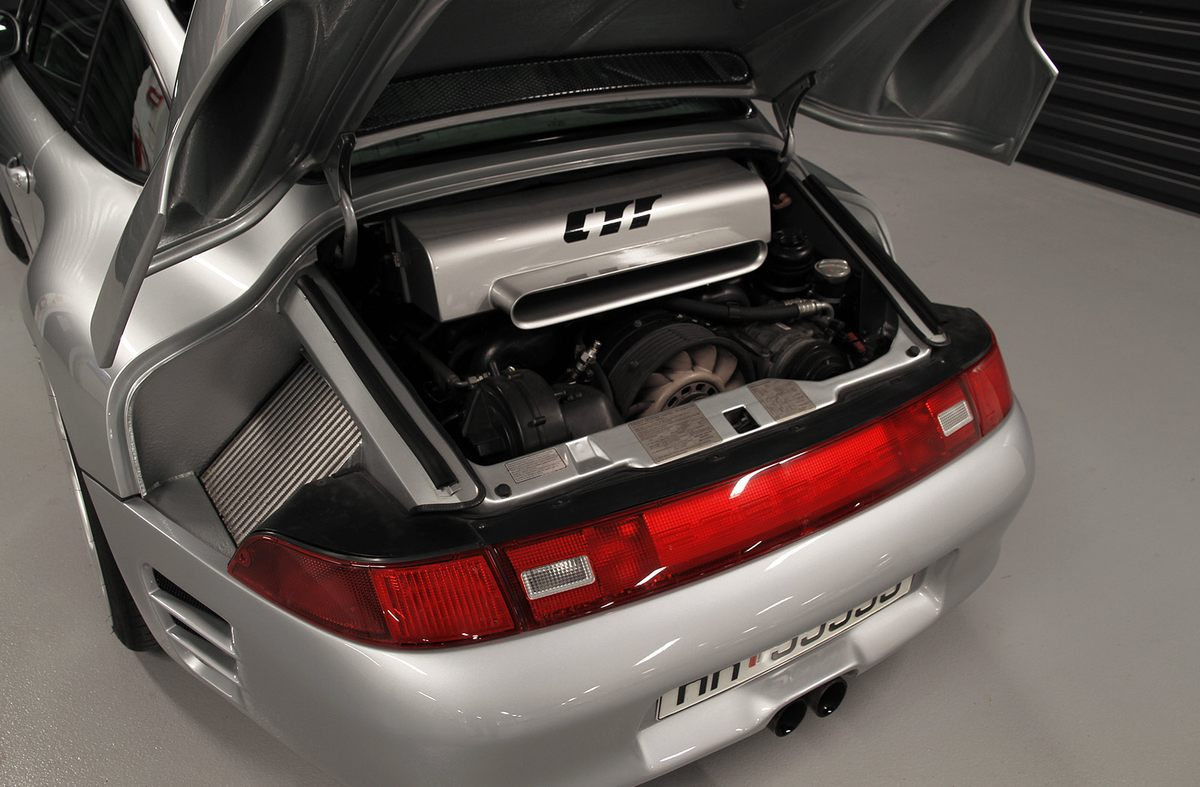
Engine

Ruf came into the public eye in 1987 when they released their Porsche 911 Carrera 3.2-based CTR, an extremely limited-production model which for several years held the title of world's fastest production vehicle. Wanting an ultra-high performance model to remain among the company offerings, Alois Ruf Jr., the company owner, followed up the original with a CTR2 in 1995, another production model made in limited quantities, based on the then-new 993-chassis 911 Turbo. Originally offered at a retail Price of $315,000 USD, the CTR2 featured either the standard rear-wheel drive or an optional all-wheel-drive, Recaro racing seats with Simpson five-point belts, enlarged brakes, an integrated roll-cage, a Ruf manufactured coil-over suspension system, an integrated bi-functional rear wing (for downforce, and air induction to 2 intercoolers, one on each side) and a kevlar body with lightweight glass; power came from a race derived air-cooled Porsche 3.6 litre, twin-turbocharged flat-six engine, based on the engine used in the Porsche 962 Le Mans Group C car (hence the name CTR2) but tuned by Ruf to produce 520 hp (388 kW) and 505 ft lb (685 N·m) of torque. The car's engine was revised later to bump the power output to 580 hp (433 kW).

== Motorsport ==
In 1997, Alois Ruf intended to prove the new car's ability and entered two special wide-body 'CTR2 Yellowbird' prototype 'Sport' versions, code-named 'CTR2sport' with 702 hp (523 kW) in the 1997 Pikes Peak Hillclimb race. These cars were built to both FIA and Pikes Peak regulations, and driven by brothers Steve Beddor and David Beddor. Unlike other competitors, both cars were race modified, while also being road registered, street legal cars. As demonstration of the Ruf's flexibility, they were street driven to and from the Pikes Peak racecourse. In the event, the Ruf CTR2sport driven by Steve Beddor placed 1st in overall qualifying and finished 2nd overall in the race, while his brother David in the second Ruf finished 4th overall. Steve Beddor's 'Pikes Peak' prototype Ruf CTR2sport, went on to win the Virginia City Hill Climb 3 times, as well as finishing 1st-place in 20 other races nationwide, making it arguably one of the most important 'non-Zuffenhausen' Porsche racecars of the 1990s.

== Production ==
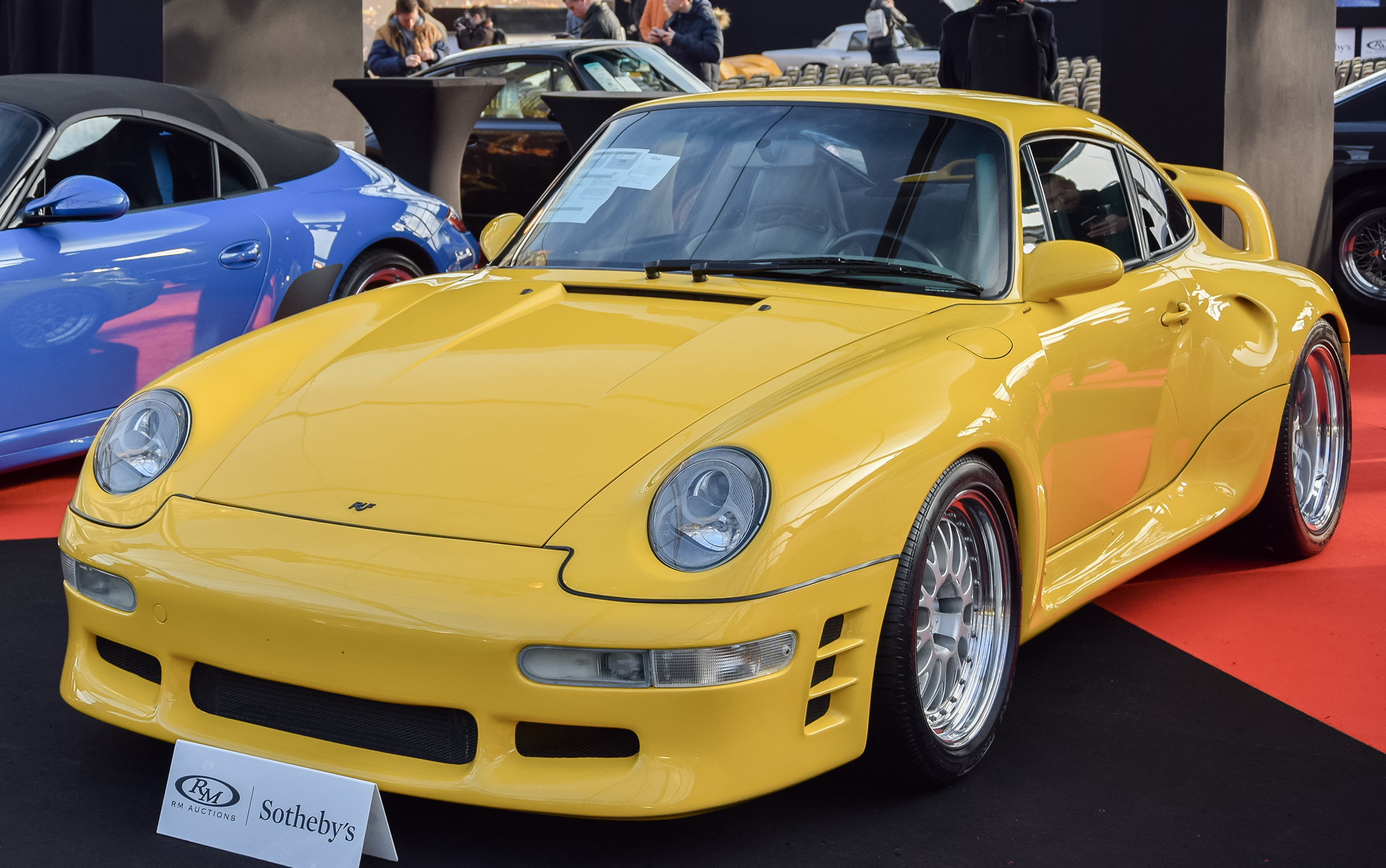
Ruf CTR2 Sport

16 standard CTR2s were produced, alongside 12 CTR2 "Sport" versions.

== Specifications ==
- Weight: 1,358 kilograms (2,994 lb)
- Tyres: 245/35ZR-19 front, 285/30ZR-19 rear
- Power: 520 hp (388 kW) at 5800 rpm (1995-'96); 580 hp (433 kw) at 5900 rpm (1997)
- Torque: 506 lb⋅ft (686 N⋅m) at 4800 rpm
- Specific output: approx. 144.44 hp (108 kW) per litre
- Power-to-weight ratio: 382 hp per tonne (at 5800 rpm); 427 hp per tonne (at 5900 rpm)
  - 0-60 mph (97 km/h): 3.6 seconds
  - 0-100 mph (160 km/h): 7.6 seconds
  - Top Speed: 217 mph (350 km/h)
- Power (CTR2sport Pikes Peak Racecar - motor # 36011): 702 hp (523 kW) at 7300 rpm
- Torque (CTR2sport Pikes Peak Racecar): 580 lb⋅ft (786 N⋅m) at 5500 rpm

== Test results ==
A 520 hp CTR2 was tested by Dennis Simanaitis for the February 1997 issue of Road & Track with the following results:

- 0-60 mph (97 km/h): 3.6 seconds
- 0-80 mph (129 km/h): 5.6 seconds
- 0-100 mph (161 km/h): 7.9 seconds
- 0-110 mph (177 km/h): 9.0 seconds
- Quarter mile: 11.4 seconds at 123.7 mph (199.1 km/h)

The tester noted that he suspected that the magazine's Road Test Editor would be even "a couple of tenths quicker" to 60 mph and that "there’s every reason to believe the Silver Flash is capable of an honest 350 km/h (217 mph) or more".

A test of another 520 hp CTR2 in a March 1997 issue of Auto, Motor und Sport yielded:

- 0-100 km/h (62.1 mph): 3.6 seconds
- 0-160 km/h (99.4 mph): 7.6 seconds
- Standing kilometer: 20.8 seconds
