= Ruf CTR3 =

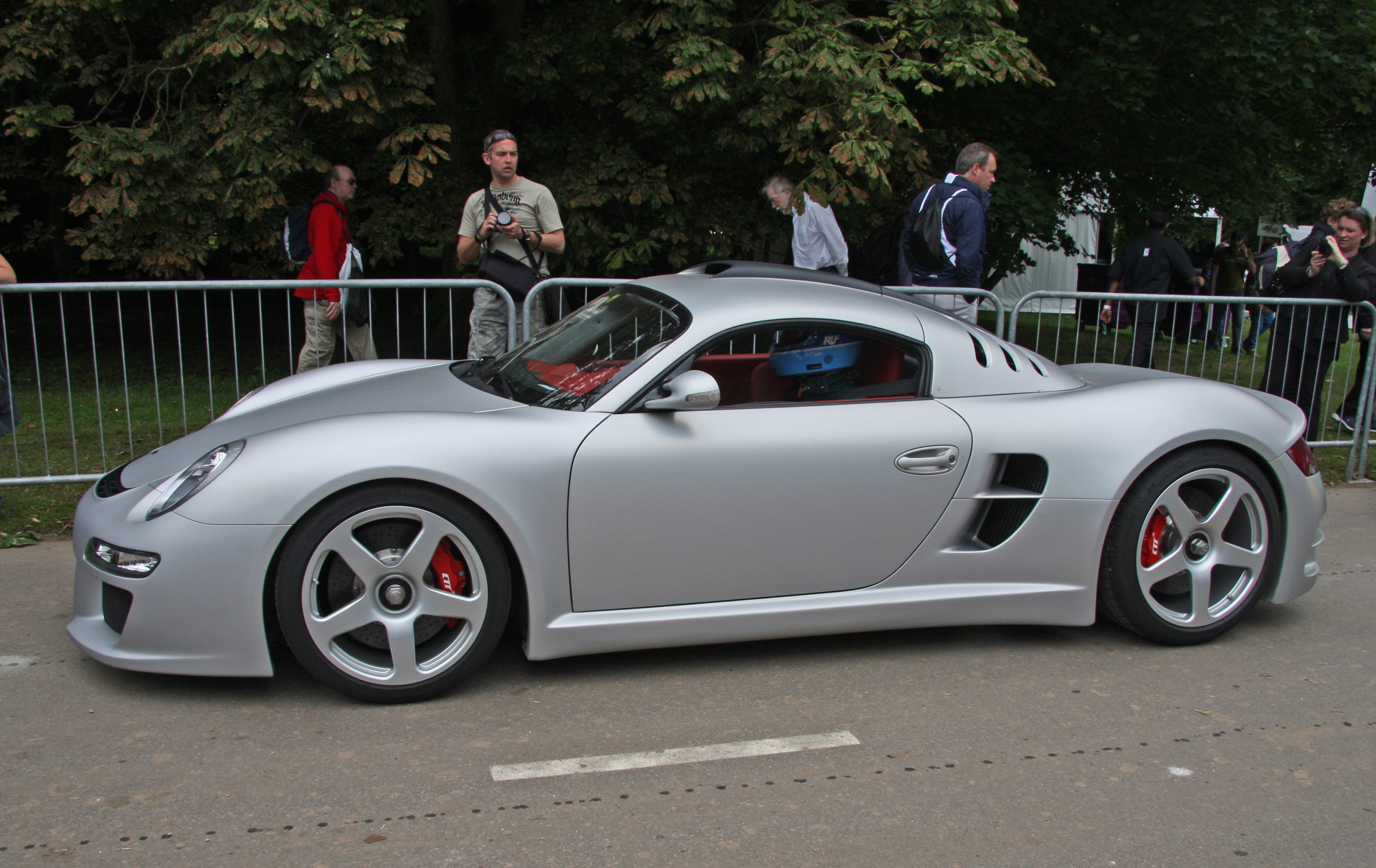

Overview
- Manufacturer: Ruf Automobile
- Production: 2007–2012 (CTR3); 2012–2023 (CTR3 Clubsport); 2023–present (CTR3 Evo)
- Assembly: Pfaffenhausen, Germany
- Designer: Bennett Soderberg

Body and chassis
- Class: Sports car (S)
- Body style: 2-door coupé
- Layout: Rear mid-engine, rear-wheel-drive
- Related: Porsche Cayman; Lykan HyperSport; Porsche 911

Powertrain
- Engine: 3.7 L CTR38 twin-turbocharged flat-6
- Transmission: 6-speed sequential manual 7-speed PDK (Clubsport)

Dimensions
- Wheelbase: 2,625 mm (103.3 in)
- Length: 4,445 mm (175.0 in)
- Width: 1,944 mm (76.5 in)
- Height: 1,200 mm (47 in)
- Curb weight: 3,035 lb (1,377 kg)

Chronology
- Predecessor: Ruf CTR2

The Ruf CTR3 is a mid-engined sports car produced by German car manufacturer Ruf Automobile. The CTR3 was unveiled at the Bahrain International Circuit on the 20th anniversary of the original Ruf CTR on April 13, 2007 in conjunction with the opening of a new Ruf factory at the circuit.

Continuing the Ruf tradition of enhancing Porsche automobiles, the CTR3 shares the body style and engine type with the contemporaneous Porsche 987 Cayman and Porsche 997.1 Turbo. For the first time, however, it features a Ruf-designed body built on a dedicated platform engineered in conjunction with Multimatic and is styled to reflect the visual feel of vintage Le Mans race cars of the 1950s and 1960s. Additionally, Ruf adopted the Porsche Cayman's mid-engine layout for the new car, rather than the traditional rear-engine layout of the previous CTR models (CTR and CTR2).

== Specifications ==
=== Powertrain ===
The Ruf CTR3 is powered by a 3,746 cc (3.7 L) twin-turbocharged flat-six engine producing a maximum power output of 691 bhp (701 PS; 515 kW) at 7,600 rpm and 889 N⋅m (656 lb⋅ft) of torque at 4,000 rpm. The cylinder block and heads are made of aluminum alloy with a bore and stroke of 102 mm × 76.4 mm (4.02 by 3.01 inches), and the engine utilizes a dual overhead camshaft valvetrain. The engine has a compression ratio of 9.2:1 and is controlled by a Bosch Motronic ECU.

The flat-six engine is paired with KKK K24 twin-turbochargers and two air-to-air intercoolers.

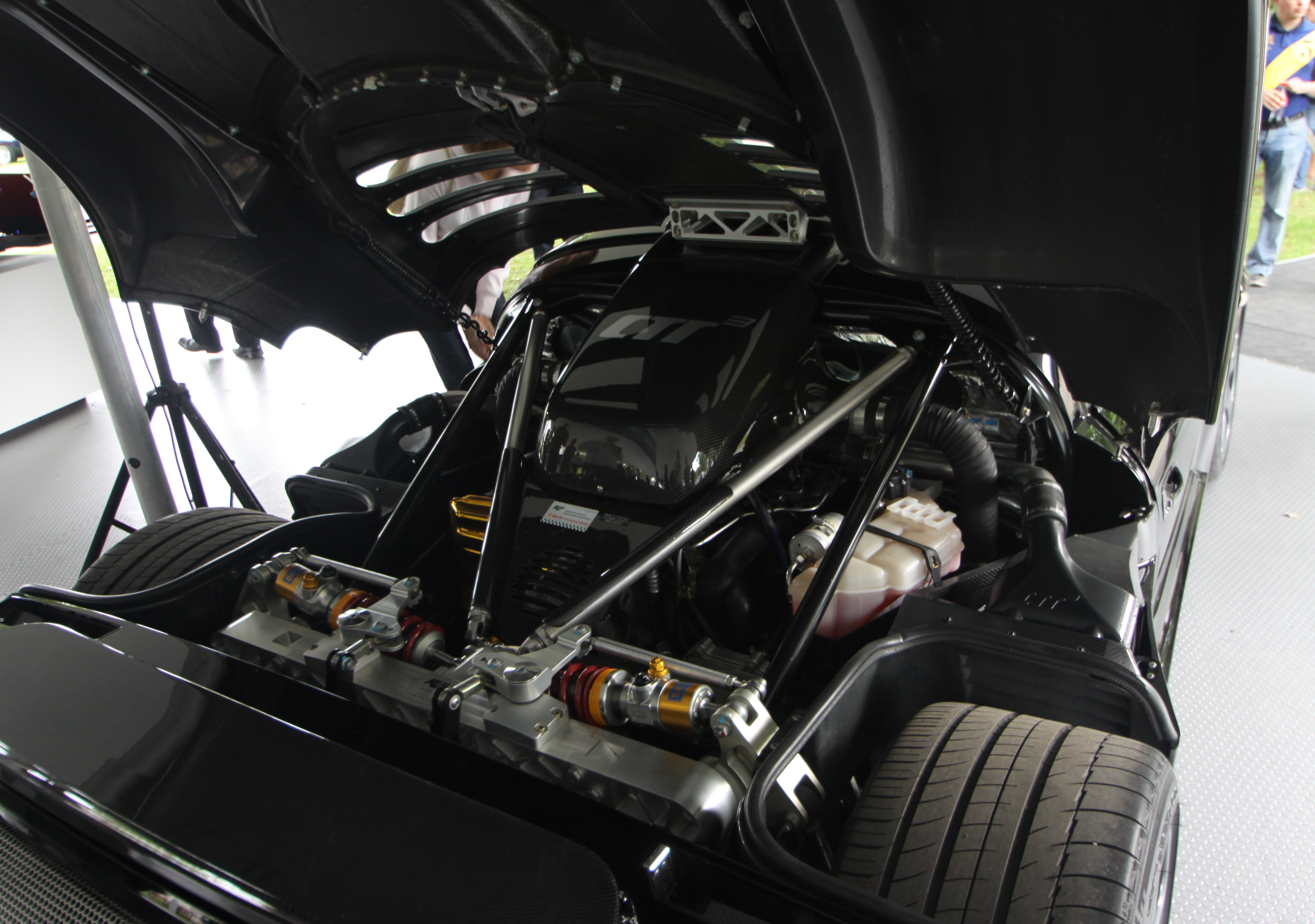
The H6-TT engine in the CTR3.

=== Transmission ===
The CTR3 is equipped with a transversely mounted 6-speed sequential manual transmission. The transmission is paired with a limited-slip differential.

=== Chassis ===
The CTR3 has a frame constructed from aluminum and zinc-dipped steel for the front and passenger sections of the car. The rear frame around the engine is a space frame constructed from billet aluminum by Multimatic that Ruf calls 'the Birdcage'. The body panels are made from a kevlar-carbon composite, and the car weighs 1,400 kg (3,086 lb) in total.

Ruf CTR3 at the 2009 Goodwood Festival of Speed

=== Suspension ===
The CTR3 utilizes MacPherson strut suspension on the front axle from the Porsche 911, and multi-link suspension with horizontal coil over shock absorbers at the rear axle. Anti-roll bars are installed on both axles.

=== Wheels ===
The CTR3 is equipped with forged aluminum wheels with diameters of 19 inches at the front and 20 inches at the rear. The tires are Michelin Pilot Super Sports with codes of 255/35 ZR 19 for the front and 335/30 ZR 20 for the rear. The brakes are ventilated ceramic composite discs, with a diameter of 380mm each and utilizing six-piston aluminium calipers at the front and rear.

== Performance ==
The CTR3 has claimed acceleration times of 0-60 mph (97 km/h) in 3.2 seconds, with an estimated top speed of 233 mph (375 km/h). The extra 86 hp (64 kW) and 91 N⋅m (67 lbf⋅ft) of torque in the Clubsport reduce its 0-60 mph (97 km/h) time to 3.0 seconds, with an estimated top speed of 236 mph (380 km/h).

== CTR3 Clubsport ==
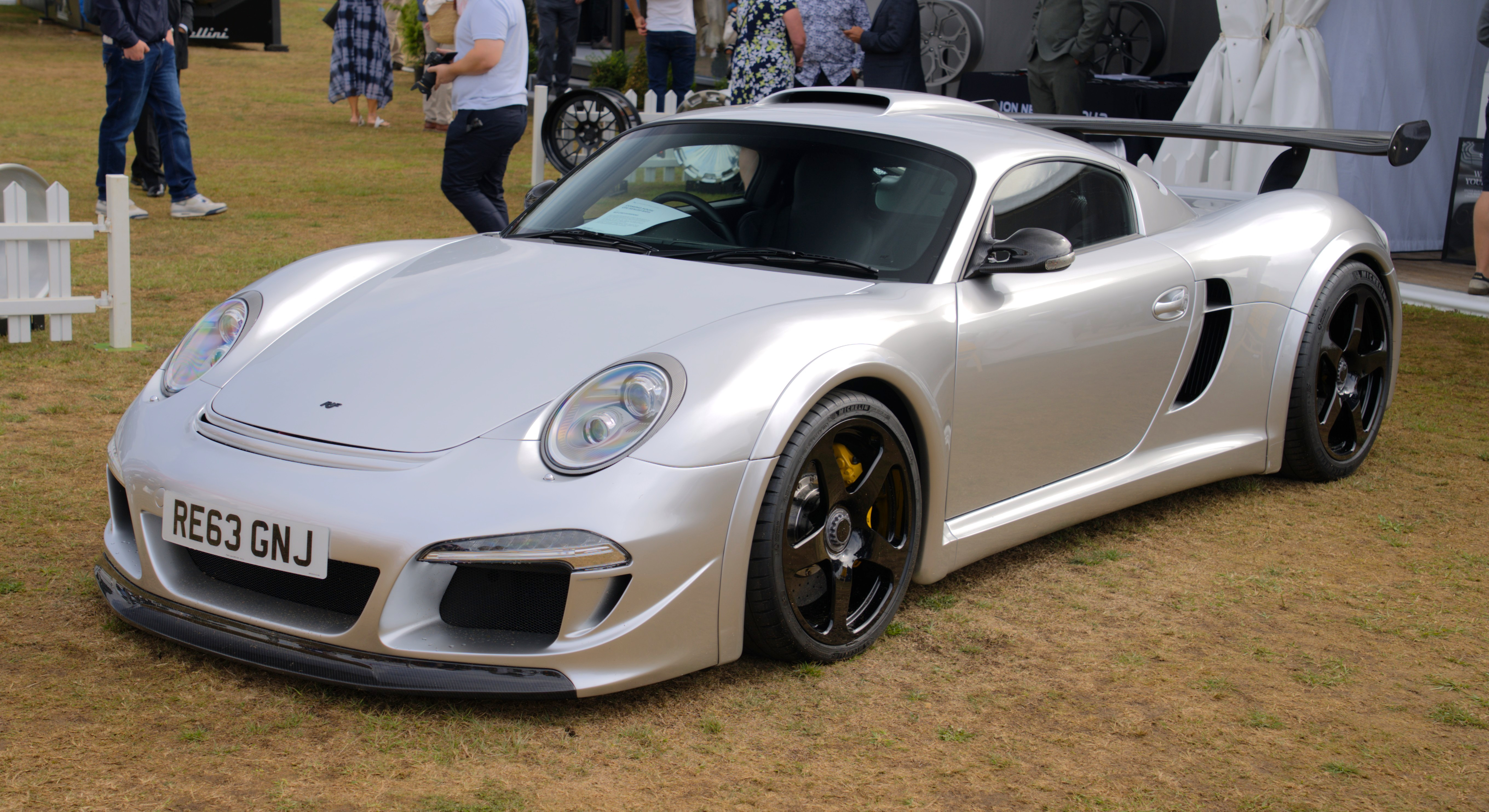
2013 Ruf CTR3 Clubsport

Ruf unveiled the CTR3 Clubsport variant at the 2012 Geneva Motor Show as an evolution and replacement of the standard CTR3. The Clubsport features a revised engine with power boosted to 777 PS (571 kW; 766 hp) at 7,000 rpm and a maximum torque of 980 N⋅m (723 lb⋅ft) at 4,000 rpm. The Clubsport also introduced an optional 7-speed dual-clutch transmission in addition to the standard 6-speed sequential manual. As of May 2018, only 7 CTR3 Clubsport cars have been built in addition to 30 standard CTR3 cars.

The CTR3 Clubsport shares many features with the Lykan HyperSport, a car developed from the same engine. Among these similarities are: engine (3.7L twin-turbo flat-six), transmissions (6-speed sequential manual and 7-speed PDK), suspension (MacPherson strut front and multi-link rear), wheels, tyres and brakes (255/35 ZR 19 for the front, 335/30 ZR 20 for the rear, 380mm carbon ceramic discs), weight (1,377 kg for the CTR3 and 1,380 kg for the Hypersport), and physical dimensions (height and length are within 35mm, wheelbase and width are identical at 2,625mm and 1,944mm respectively).

== CTR3 Evo ==
Ruf unveiled the CTR3 Evo at the 2023 Monterey Car Week as an evolution of the CTR3 Clubsport. The Evo has a tuned version of the 3.8L twin turbo flat six from the Clubsport, with power increased to 800 PS (588 kW; 789 hp) at 7100 rpm and 990 N⋅m (730 lb⋅ft) of torque at 4000 rpm. Ruf claims a top speed of 236 mph (380 km/h) for the Evo. It also features tweaked bodywork, including new front and rear bumpers, and the Cayman taillights of previous CTR3 models being replaced with circular units.

== Gallery ==
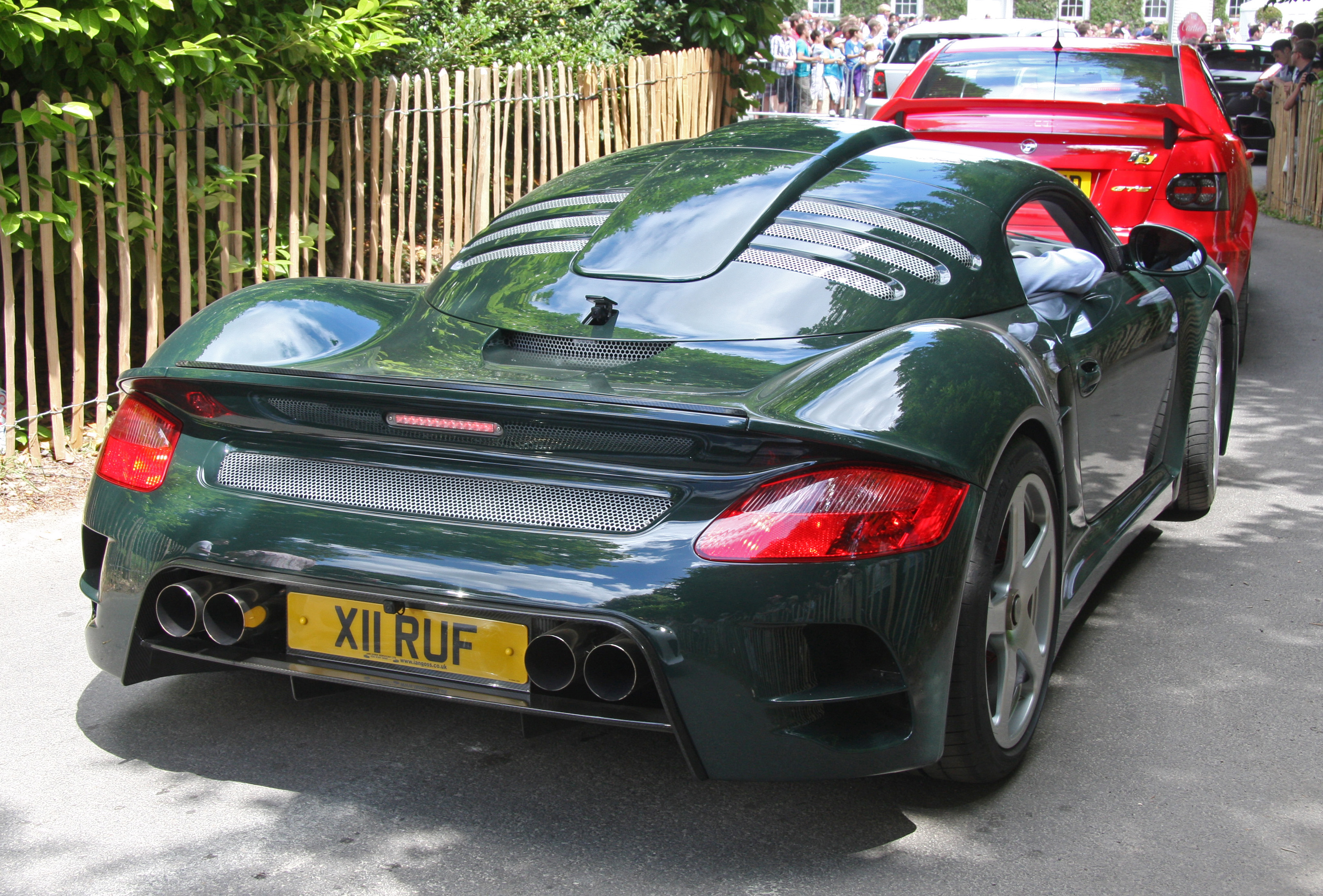
CTR3 (Rear view)

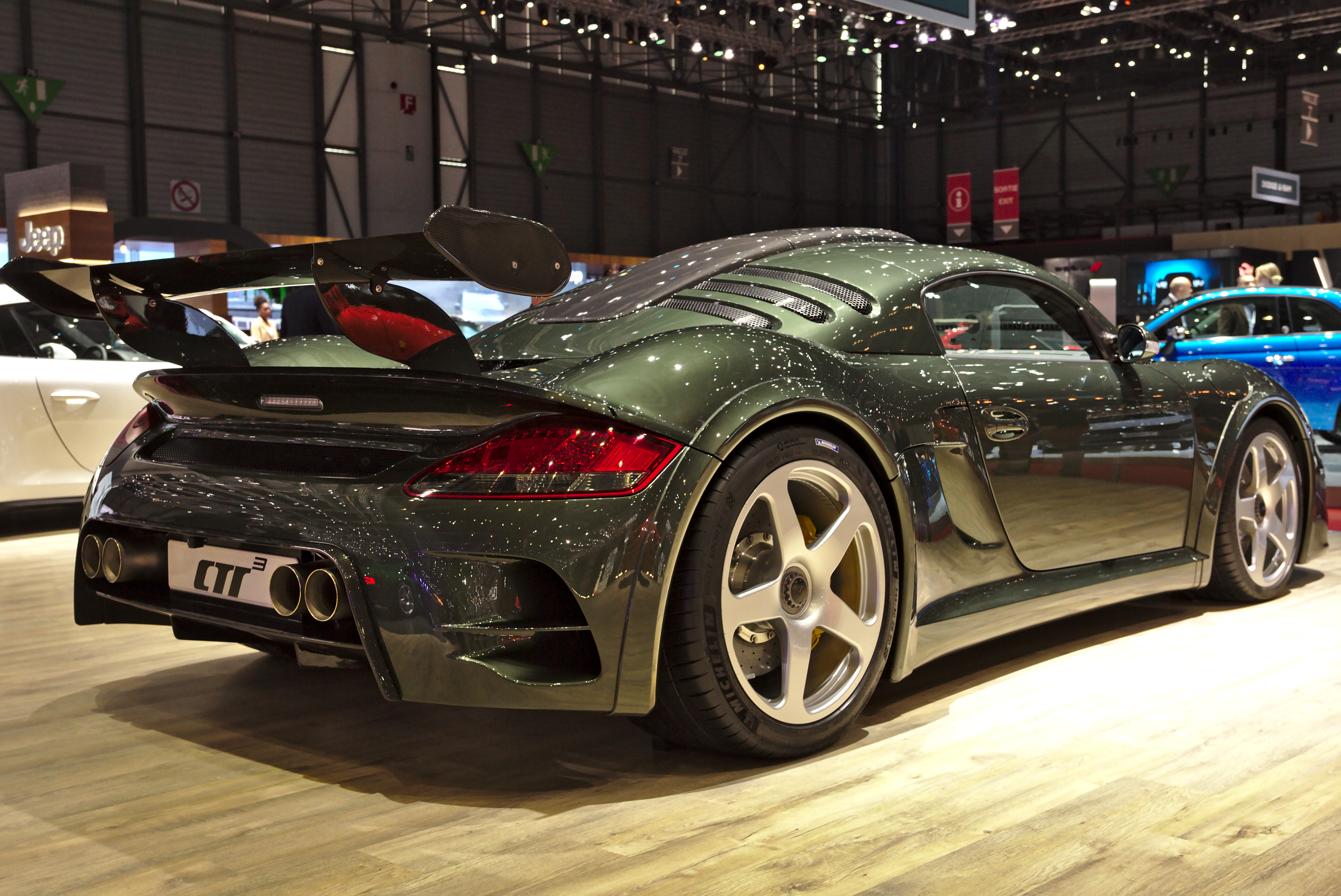
CTR3 Clubsport (Rear view)

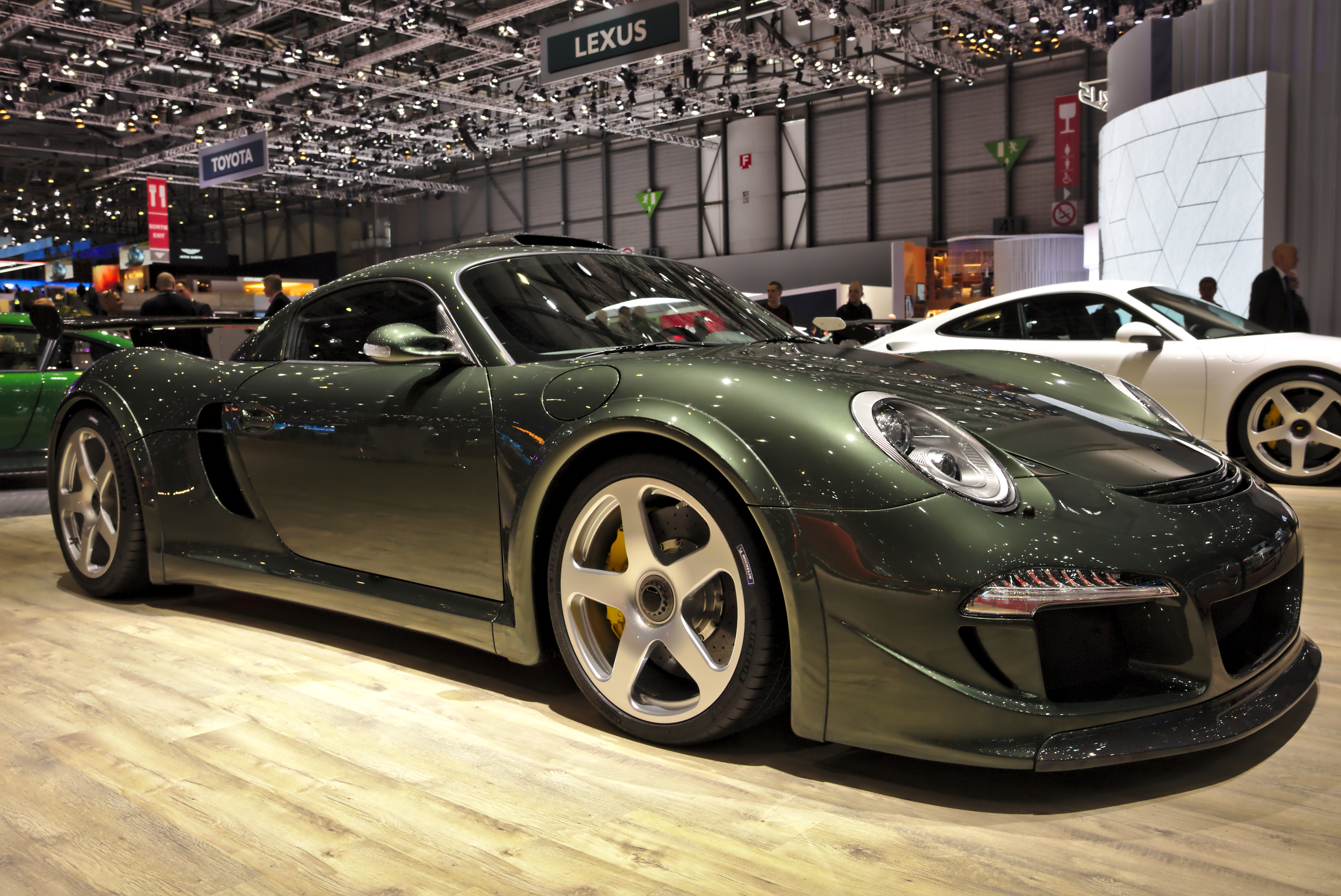
2018 CTR3 Clubsport
