= Ruf CTR =

Ruf CTR "Yellowbird"
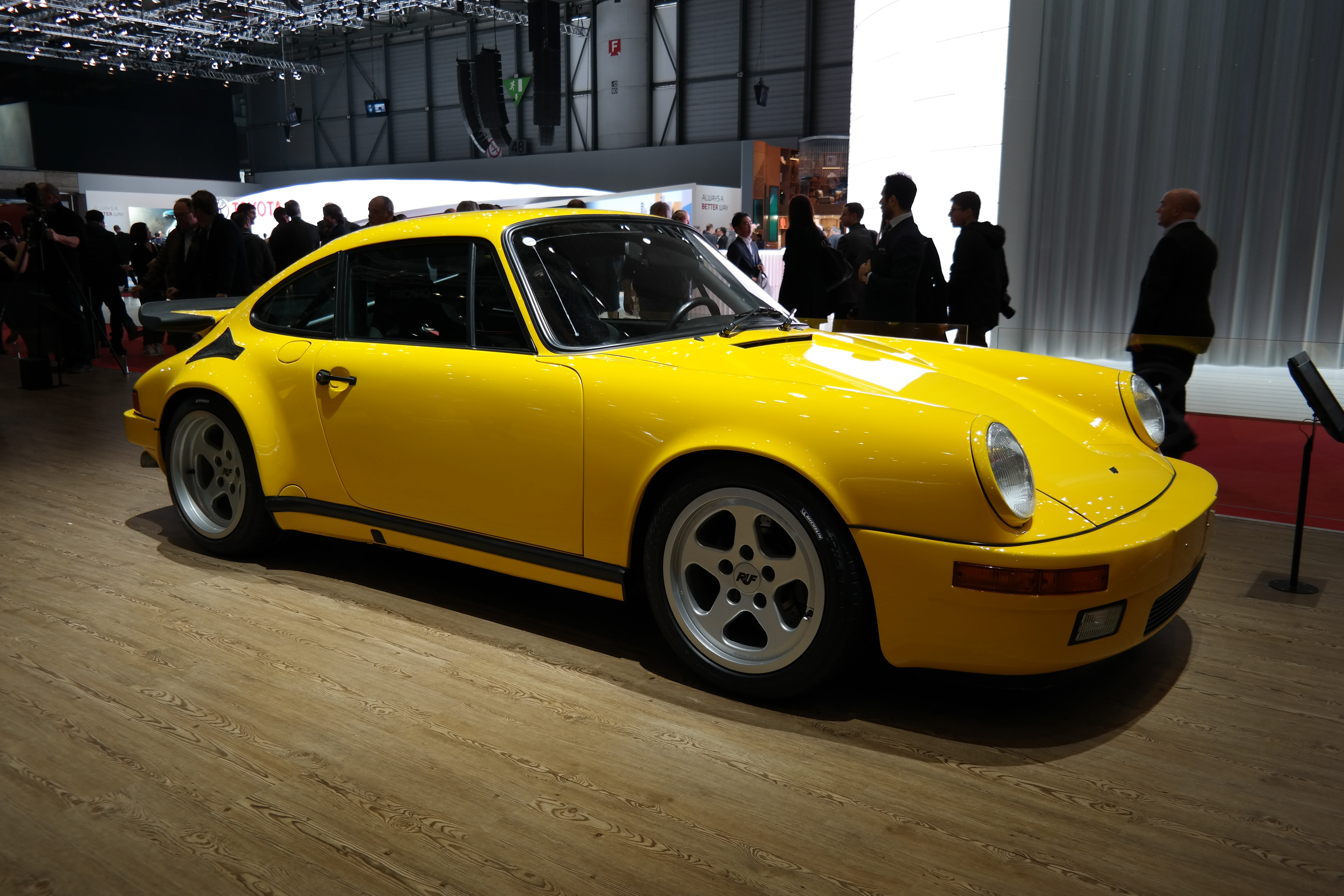

Overview
- Manufacturer: Ruf Automobile GmbH
- Production: 1987–1996 (29 built from scratch, rest converted from customer cars)
- Assembly: Pfaffenhausen, Germany

Body and chassis
- Class: Sports car (S)
- Body style: 2-door coupé
- Layout: Longitudinally-mounted, rear-engine, rear-wheel-drive
- Related: Porsche 911

Powertrain
- Engine: 3.4 L (3,367 cc) twin-turbocharged flat-6
- Power output: 469 PS (345 kW; 463 hp); 553 N⋅m (408 lbf⋅ft) of torque
- Transmission: 5-speed manual

Dimensions
- Wheelbase: 2,273 mm (89.5 in)
- Length: 4,290 mm (169 in)
- Width: 1,775 mm (69.9 in)
- Height: 1,311 mm (51.6 in)
- Curb weight: 1,150 kg (2,535 lb)

Chronology
- Predecessor: Ruf BTR
- Successor: Ruf CTR2; Ruf CTR Anniversary (spiritual)

The Ruf CTR (Group C, Turbo Ruf) also known as the CTR Yellowbird or simply Yellowbird, is a limited-production, high performance sports car manufactured by German automobile manufacturer Ruf Automobile. Introduced for the 1987 model year and based on the Porsche 911, the CTR featured an enlarged and highly tuned version of Porsche's 3.2 litre flat-six cylinder engine, lightened body panels, an integrated roll cage (adding chassis stiffness in addition to occupant safety), upgraded suspension and braking systems, a custom-designed transmission, and several unique trim pieces such as polyurethane bumpers, and the use of the side-mounted oil filler (a Porsche feature for the 1972 model year only) necessitated by relocating the oil tank forward to clear the intercooler on that side.

The car received its nickname, "Yellowbird", during testing by Road & Track magazine, whose staff members noted the contrast created by its yellow paintwork against the overcast skies on the day of their photo shoot.

== History ==
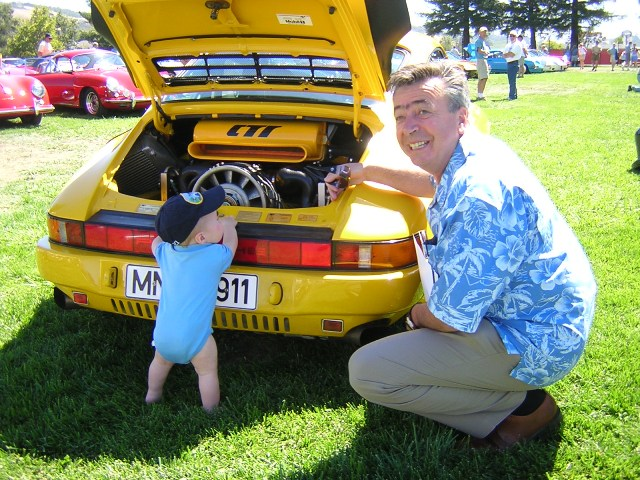
A view of the engine bay of the CTR with Alois Ruf present near the car

The CTR (abbreviation of "Group C Turbo Ruf") was based on the 1987 911 Carrera 3.2 as opposed to the 930; Porsche's factory turbocharged version of the 911. The decision to base the car on the Carrera 3.2 was made because of the 3.2's slightly lower curb weight and drag coefficient. Factory body panels including the doors, hood and engine cover were replaced with aluminum pieces, helping to reduce an additional 200 kg (441 lb) of weight as compared to the vehicle's factory curb weight. Efforts to reduce drag, the use of fiberglass front and rear bumpers and a pair of intake ducts on the rear flares to allow airflow to the intercoolers topped the list of body modifications. The rear arches were also slightly increased in width to accommodate the larger Speedline wheels.

In addition to the lighter panels, considerable modifications were made to the engine, including boring the cylinders out to 98 mm (4 in) to increase displacement from 3.2 L (3,164 cc) to 3.4 L (3,367 cc), adding an uprated DME fuel injection system originally designed for the Porsche 962 race car. A specifically designed turbo system featuring large twin-turbochargers and twin intercoolers were the main highlights of the modifications done to the engine, bringing total output to 469 PS (345 kW; 463 hp) at 5,950 rpm and 553 N⋅m (408 lbf⋅ft) of torque at 5,100 rpm.

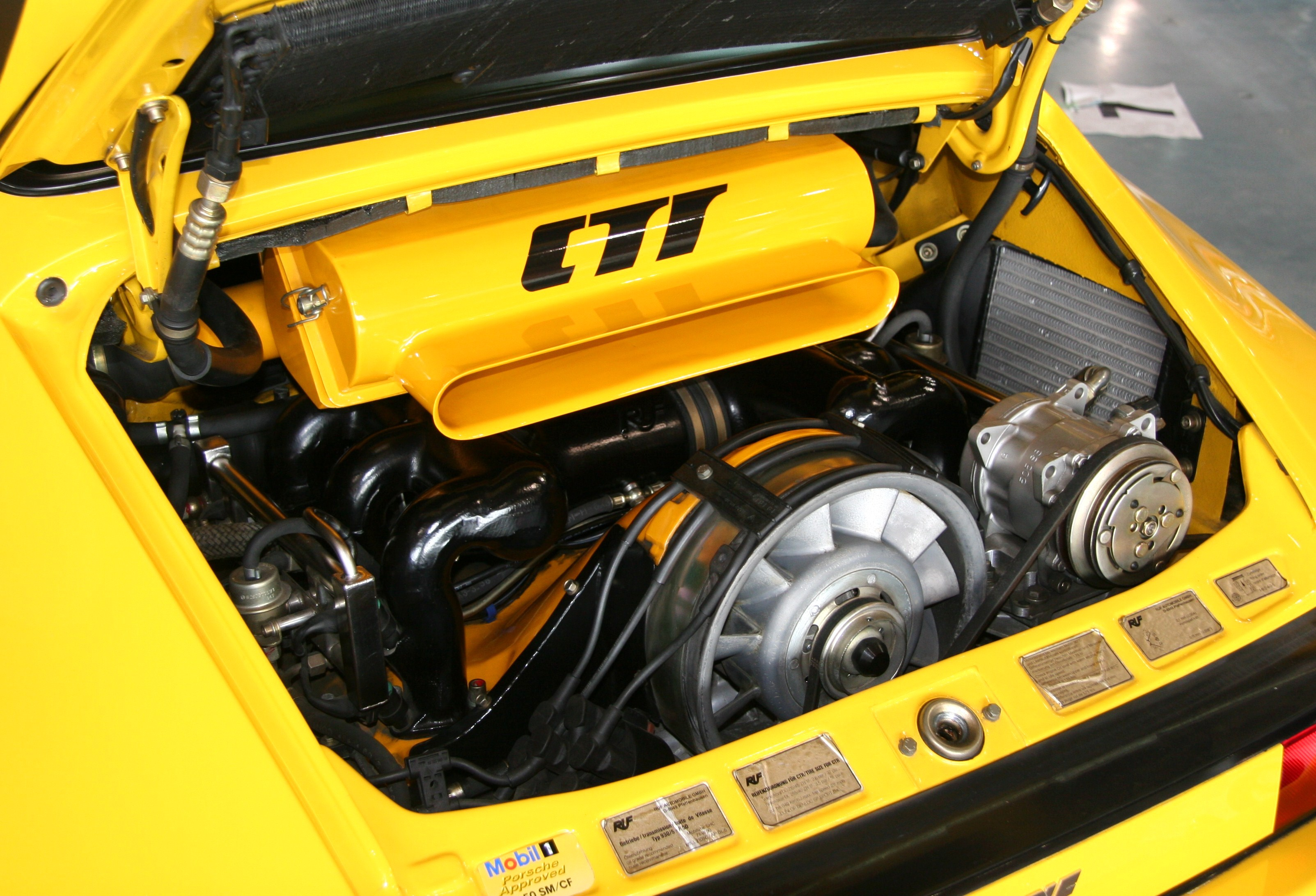
Ruf CTR Yellowbird powerplant

At the time, Porsche offered the 911 3.2 with a 5-speed manual transmission, but the 930 featured only a 4-speed manual transmission, chosen because it was the only unit manufactured by the company that could handle the turbocharged engine's high power output. Not content with only four forward gears and unable to satisfactorily modify the 5-speed unit, Ruf chose to use a new five-speed transmission of their own design on the CTR, which also gave them full freedom to customise gear ratios. An upgraded suspension system, 17 inch Ruf Speedline alloy wheels, 330 mm (13.0 in) diameter Brembo braking system, and Dunlop's Denloc system performance tyres were used.

The company debuted the vehicle at the end of 1987 with pricing set at US$142,900 (approx US$362,000 in 2022), although that number could vary depending on whether a given customer ordered it directly from Ruf or brought in a car purchased via dealer for conversion. Ruf manufactured only 29 cars from chassis bought from Porsche; about 20–30 cars were built from customers' Carreras.

== Specifications ==
Ruf rated the CTR at 469 PS (345 kW; 463 hp) and 408 lb⋅ft (553 N⋅m) of torque. It is said that the official power output of 469 PS was the lowest dynamometer reading of all the CTR engines tested while the average figure was closer to 500 PS (368 kW; 493 hp) or even higher.

Weighing in at 2,535 lb (1,150 kg), the CTR had a 0-60 mph acceleration time of 3.65 seconds and a top speed in excess of 210 mph. Although the Porsche 959 was faster in terms of acceleration to 60 mph, the Yellowbird could outperform all competition when it came to top speed, topping out at 342 km/h (213 mph), a top speed that made it the fastest production car in the world at the time of its introduction.

=== Technical specifications ===
Sources:

- Engine configuration: Twin-turbocharged SOHC 2 valves per cylinder flat-six engine
- Bore X Stroke: 98 mm × 74.4 mm (3.86 in × 2.93 in)
- Displacement: 3,367 cc (3.4 L; 205.5 cu in)
- Compression ratio: 7.5:1
- Power: 469 PS (345 kW; 463 hp) at 5,950 rpm
- Torque: 553 N⋅m (408 lb⋅ft) at 5,100 rpm
- Redline: 6,800 rpm
- Curb weight: 1,150 kg (2,535 lb)
- Gearbox: 5-speed manual transmission (6-speed optional)
- Tyres: 215/45ZR-17 front, 255/40ZR-17 rear
- Layout: Rear-engine, rear-wheel-drive.

== Performance ==
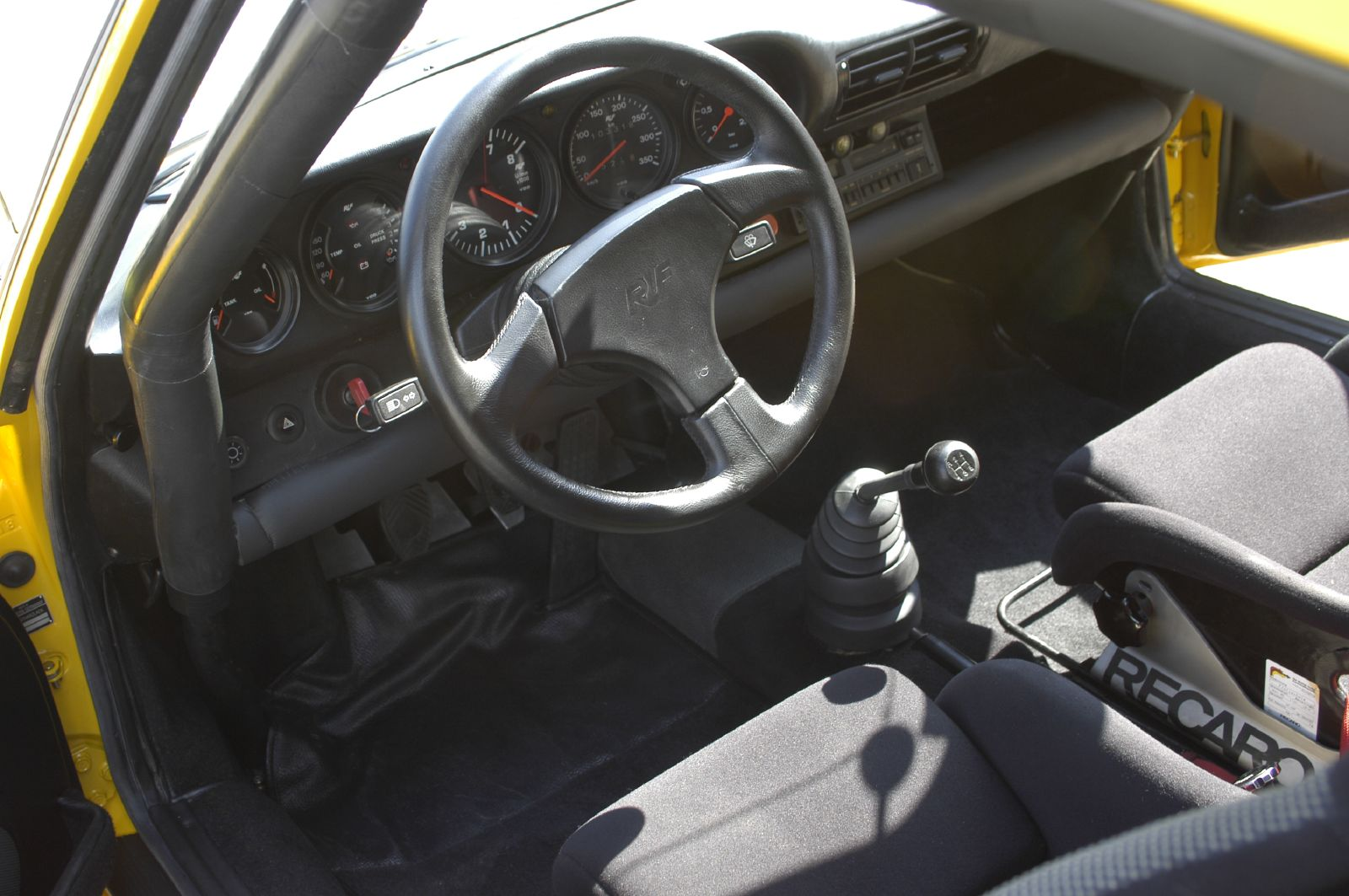
Interior

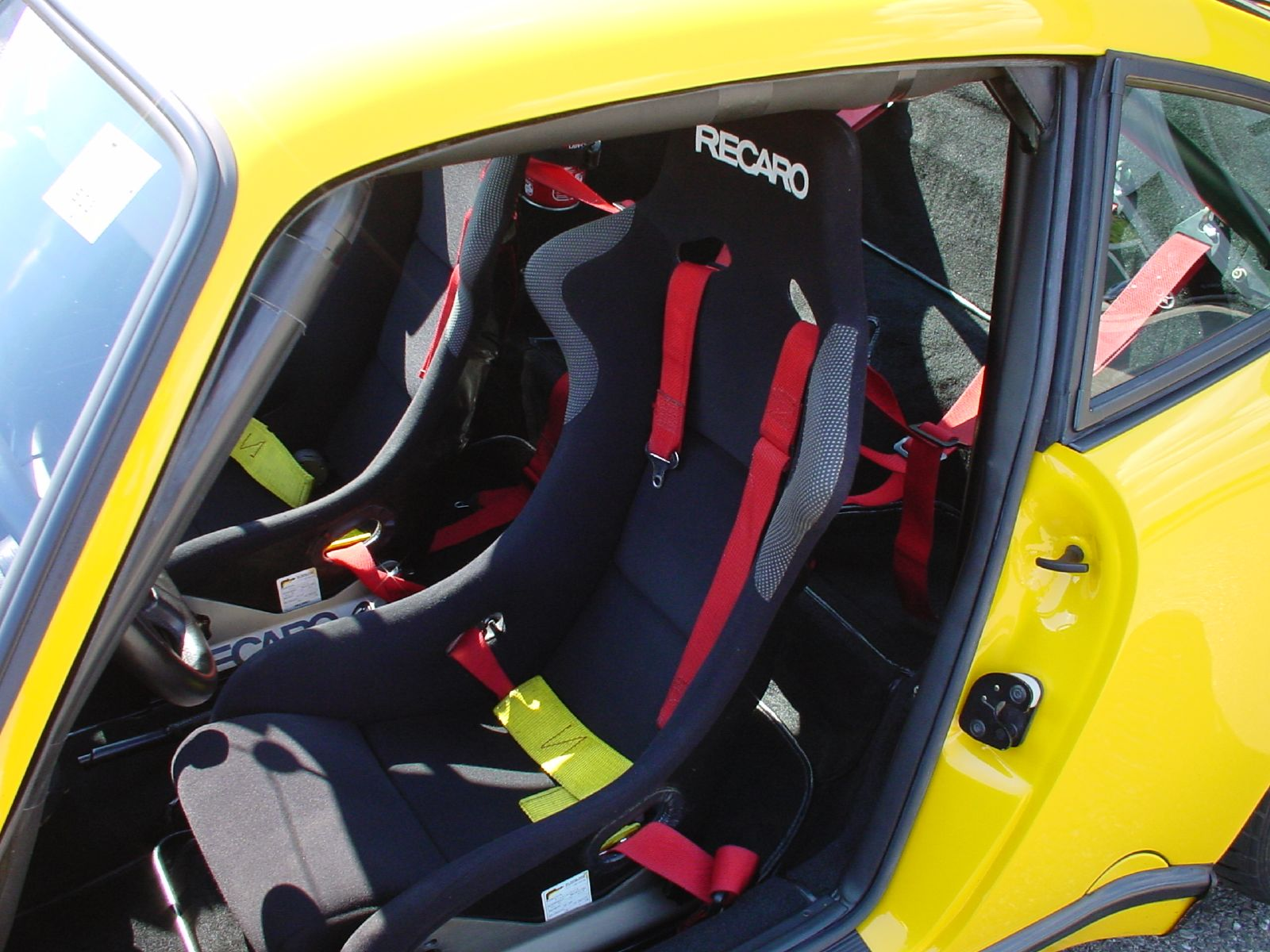
The Recaro seats in a CTR

The CTR could generally outperform most of the other high performance cars of the time, including the Ferrari Testarossa and Lamborghini Countach. In addition, despite being slower than the Porsche 959 in accelerating from 0-60 mph, it could outperform the Porsche 959, Ferrari F40, and the Lamborghini Diablo accelerating from 0-100 mph and attain a higher top speed.

The CTR was also a highly competent track vehicle, and for several years it held the unofficial lap record at the Nürburgring-Nordschleife track.

Test results by Autocar:

- 0–30 mph (48 km/h): 1.69 seconds
- 0–60 mph (97 km/h): 3.65 seconds
- 0–100 mph (161 km/h): 6.71 seconds
- 0–150 mph (241 km/h): 14.59 seconds
- 0–200 mph (322 km/h): 35.57 seconds
- Standing mile: 27.7 seconds at 304.34 km/h (189.11 mph)
- 0–100–0 mph: 11.85 seconds
- 0–200–0 mph: 47.20 seconds

Test results by other magazines:

- 0–100 km/h (62 mph): 4.1 seconds
- 0–200 km/h (124 mph): 10.5 seconds
- Standing 1/4 mile (402 m): 11.7 s at 215 km/h (133.5 mph)
- 0–1,000 m: 20.9 seconds
- Top speed: 342 km/h (213 mph)

== Other media ==
The Ruf CTR had its first appearance in April 1987 at the "World's Fastest Cars" contest held by American car magazine Road & Track where it was designated "The Fastest Production Car in the World". It accelerated from 0-60 mph in 4.0 seconds, 0-100 mph in 7.3 seconds, 0–200 km/h in 10.5 seconds, 1/4 mile in 11.7 seconds at 133.5 mph (215 km/h) and reached a top speed of 211 mph (340 km/h), beating the competition by 10 mph (16 km/h). Editor Paul Frère shouted "This is faster than I've ever gone in my life!" during a ride.

In 1988, Auto Motor und Sport organized a high speed test at Nardò Ring where the Ruf CTR was the fastest reaching 342 km/h (213 mph), surpassing a Porsche 959 s (339 km/h (211 mph)), two Ferrari F40s (321 km/h (199 mph) each) and a Mercedes AMG 6.0 32V (288 km/h (179 mph)). At one point it achieved an unofficial 346 km/h (215 mph).

In 1989, test driver Stefan Roser drove the CTR around the Nürburgring. The laps were captured on camera and released by Ruf in a video called "Faszination on the Nürburgring" which became famous. Car & Driver called it groundbreaking, enthralling and influential and for Top Gear it's the best and most exciting lap for watching.

In 2004, a Ruf CTR was able to keep up with newer sports cars like the Porsche Carrera GT, the Ferrari Enzo and the Mercedes-Benz SLR McLaren at the Autocar 0-100-0 challenge and impressed the audience, so did another one - with more than 100,000 kilometers on its odometer - at the Road & Track standing mile contest 2005. Steve Millen, after testing a CTR, stated: "That thing's a blast. It accelerates hard. It's a real old-school car with a lot of torque and power. Just awesome. What a rush. It pulled the whole way through."

The Ruf CTR is a playable/drivable car in the video games "The Duel: Test Drive II", "Project Gotham Racing 3", "Project Gotham Racing 4", "Driver: San Francisco", "Forza Motorsport 4", "Forza Motorsport 5", "Forza Horizon", "Forza Horizon 2", "Assetto Corsa", "Project CARS", and most of the "Gran Turismo" series games. Because of a sixteen-year-old exclusivity deal between Electronic Arts and Porsche in which Porsche would only appear in EA titles starting with Need for Speed: Porsche Unleashed, Ruf models (along with Gemballa) served as replacements for Porsche models.

== Successor ==
The CTR was succeeded in 1996 by the CTR2 based on Porsche's newer 993 Generation 911.

== Revival ==
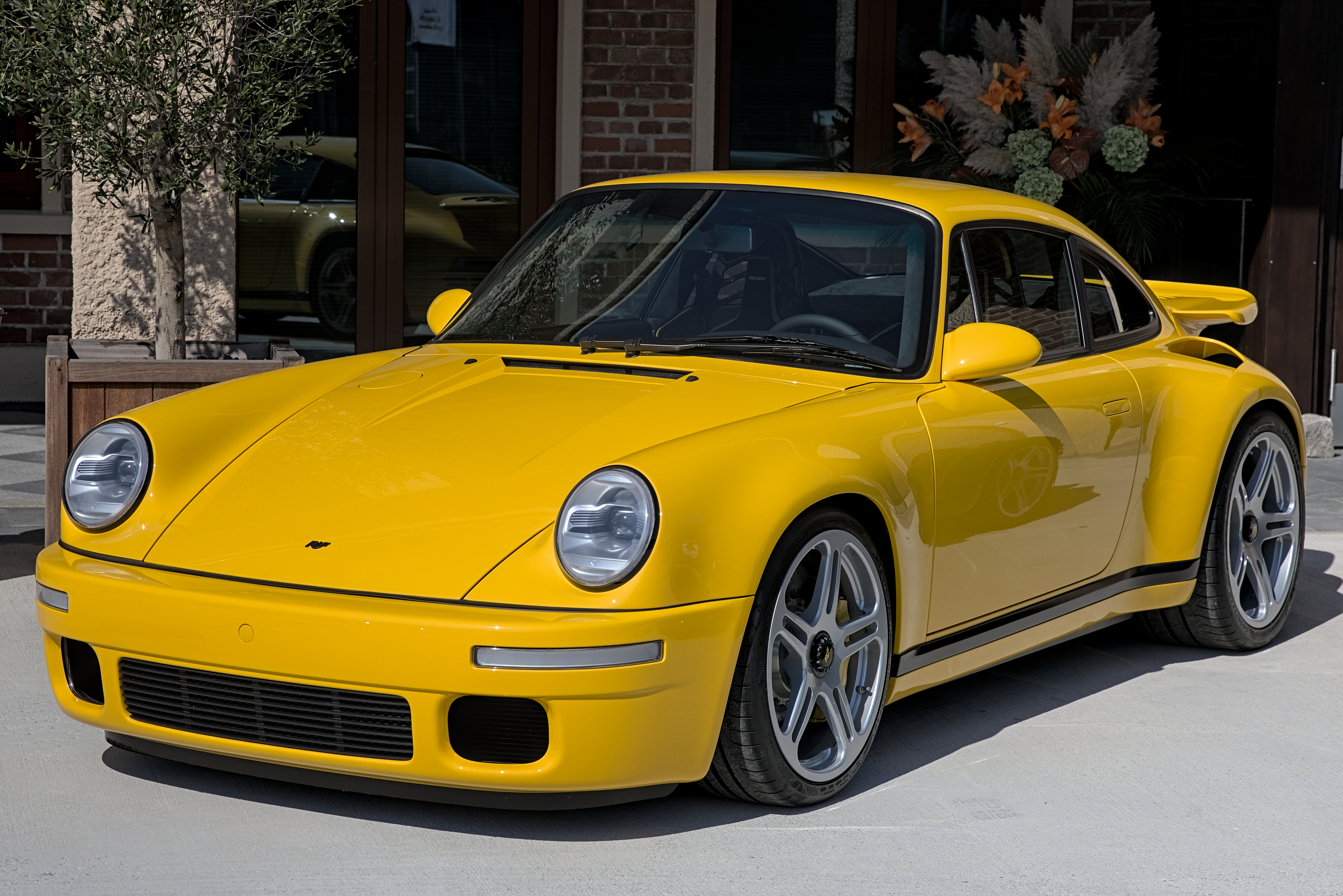
2017 Ruf CTR

At the 87th Geneva Motor Show held from 9 to 19 March 2017, exactly 30 years after the original CTR was launched, Ruf presented a new model paying tribute to the original CTR. The new CTR utilises an in-house developed carbon fibre body bearing resemblance to a Porsche 964 along with an aluminium chassis resulting in a dry weight of 2,640 lb (1,200 kg). The car is not based on the 911, unlike the original CTR. The new CTR is powered by a 3.6-litre water cooled twin-turbocharged Flat-6 engine producing 522 kW (710 PS; 700 hp) at 6,750 rpm and 880 N⋅m (649 lb⋅ft) of torque at 4,000 rpm. The car is capable of accelerating from 0–100 km/h (62 mph) in under 3.5 seconds and can reach a top speed of 360 km/h (224 mph). Power is sent to the rear wheels through a 6-speed manual gearbox. The car also sports retro components based on the original CTR such as the 'whale tail' rear wing five-spoke wheels, interior and the steering wheel. Only 50 examples of the 2017 CTR will be produced.
