= Rear-engine, four-wheel-drive layout =

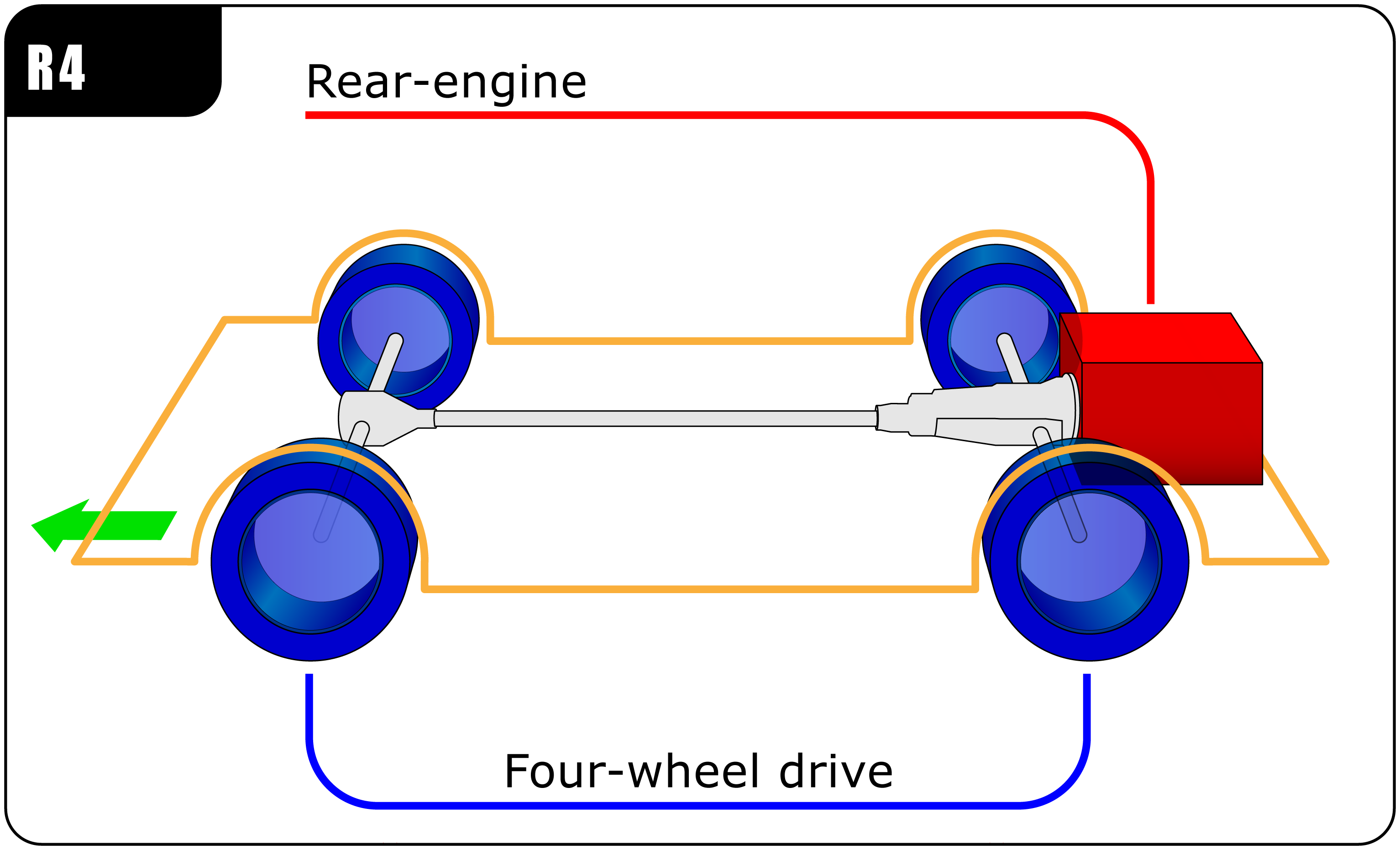
R4 layout, the engine is located behind the rear axle.

In automotive design, an R4, or rear-engine, four-wheel-drive layout places the engine at the rear of the vehicle, and drives all four roadwheels.

This layout is typically chosen to improve the traction or the handling of existing vehicle designs using the rear-engine, rear-wheel-drive layout (RR).

The R4 layout is very rare, only having been used on a small number of production vehicles. Notable vehicles with this layout include several high-performance Porsche sports cars, including the 959, the 911 Turbo since the introduction of the turbocharged version of the 993 series in 1995, and the 911 Carrera 4 introduced with the 964 series in 1989.

Some Volkswagen Kübelwagen (the rear-engined beetle-based military vehicle used by Germany in World War II) variants were produced with 4-wheel or all-wheel drive, including the Type 86, Type 87, Type 98. Also, some Vanagons/Microbuses came in 4WD Syncro version.

== Examples ==
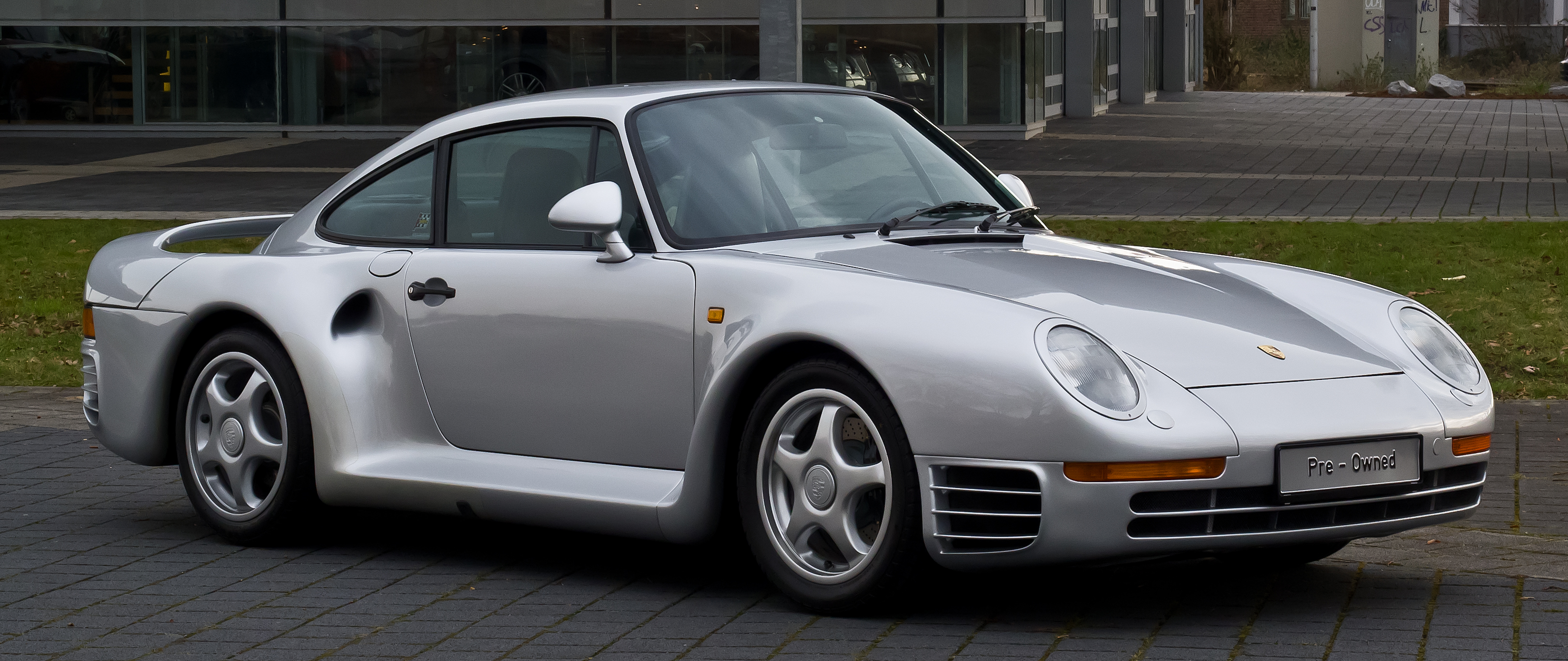
Porsche 959, rear-engine, four-wheel-drive, top speed of 197 mph to 211 mph

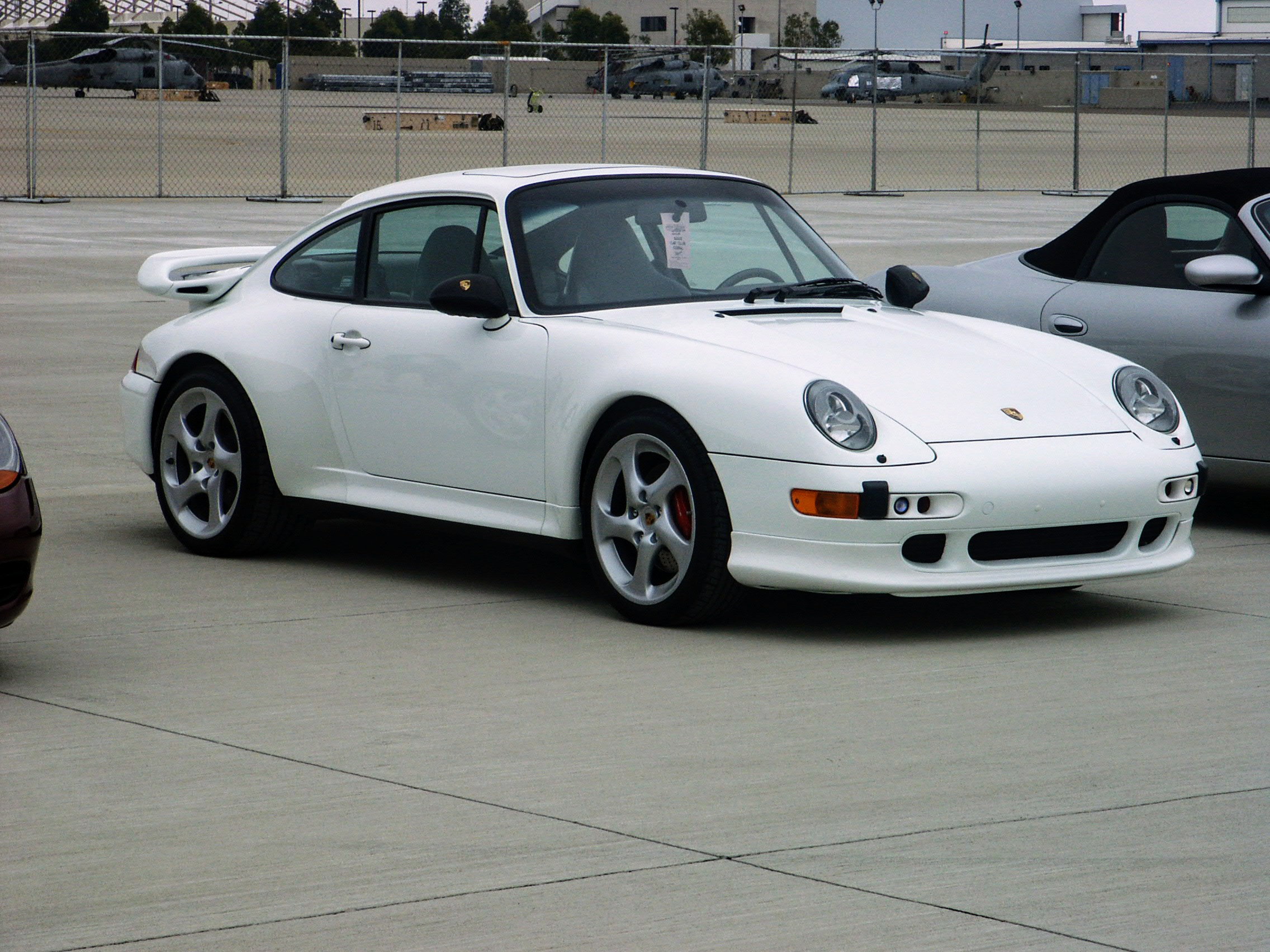
Porsche 993 Turbo

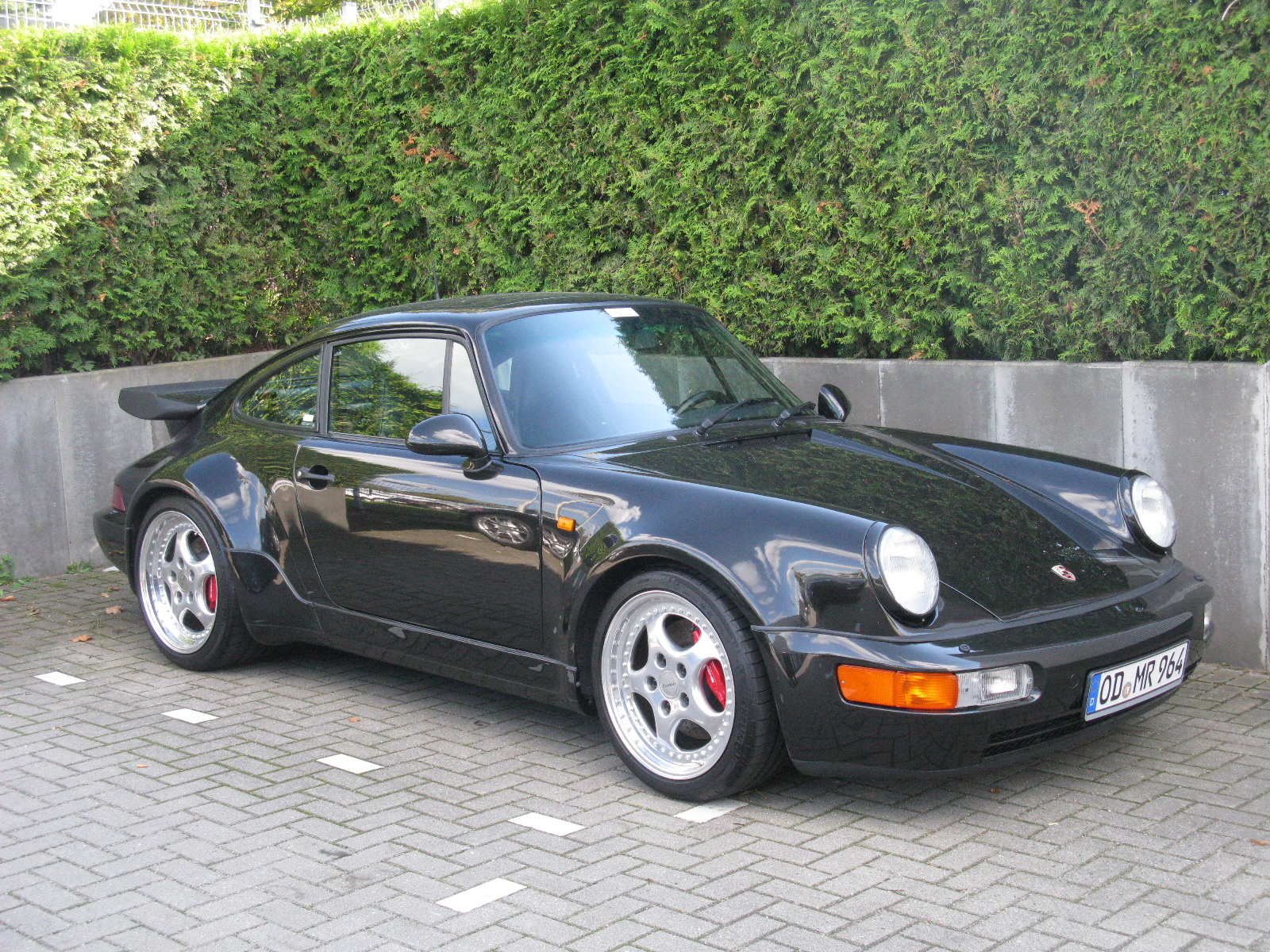
Porsche 964

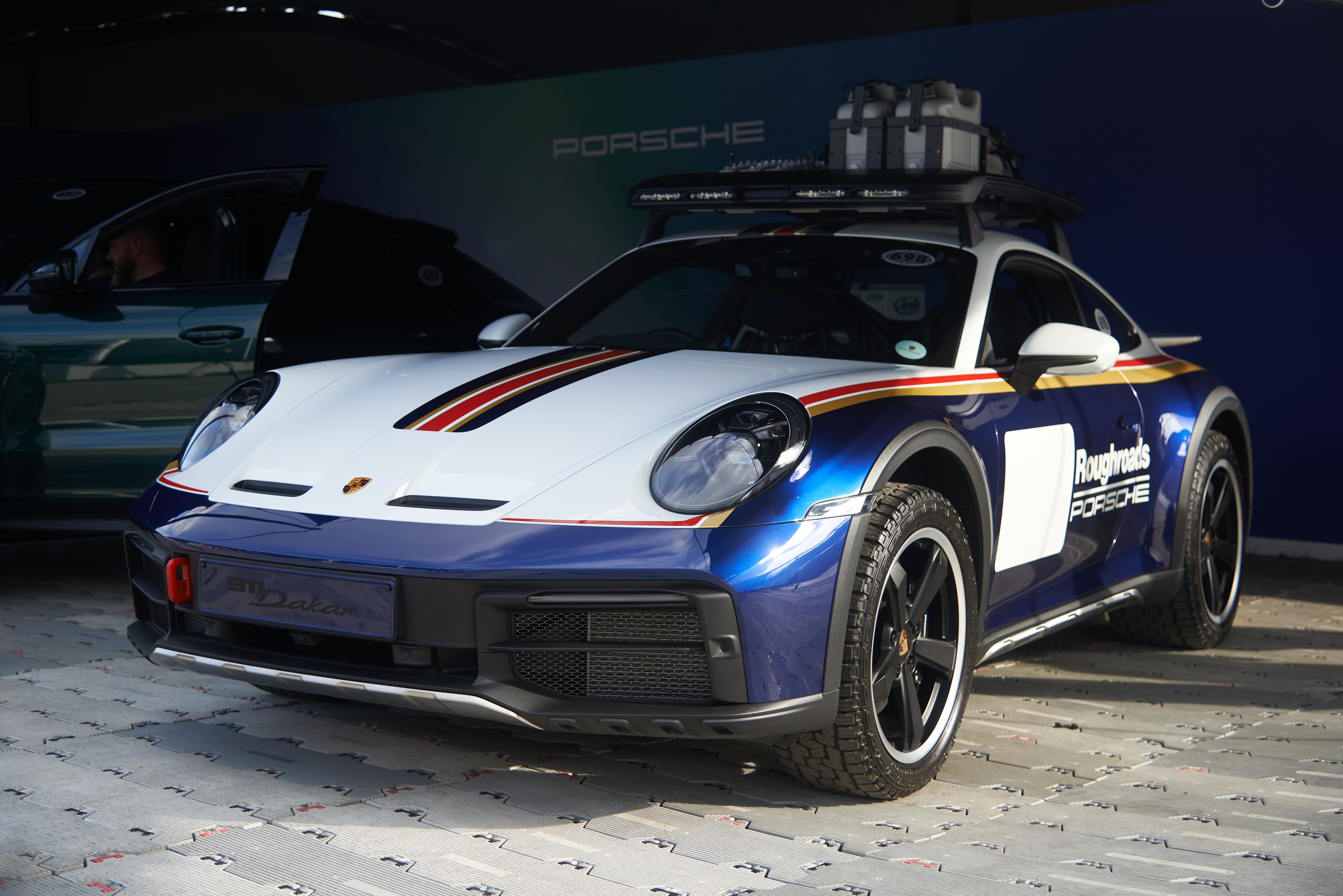
Porsche 911 Dakar

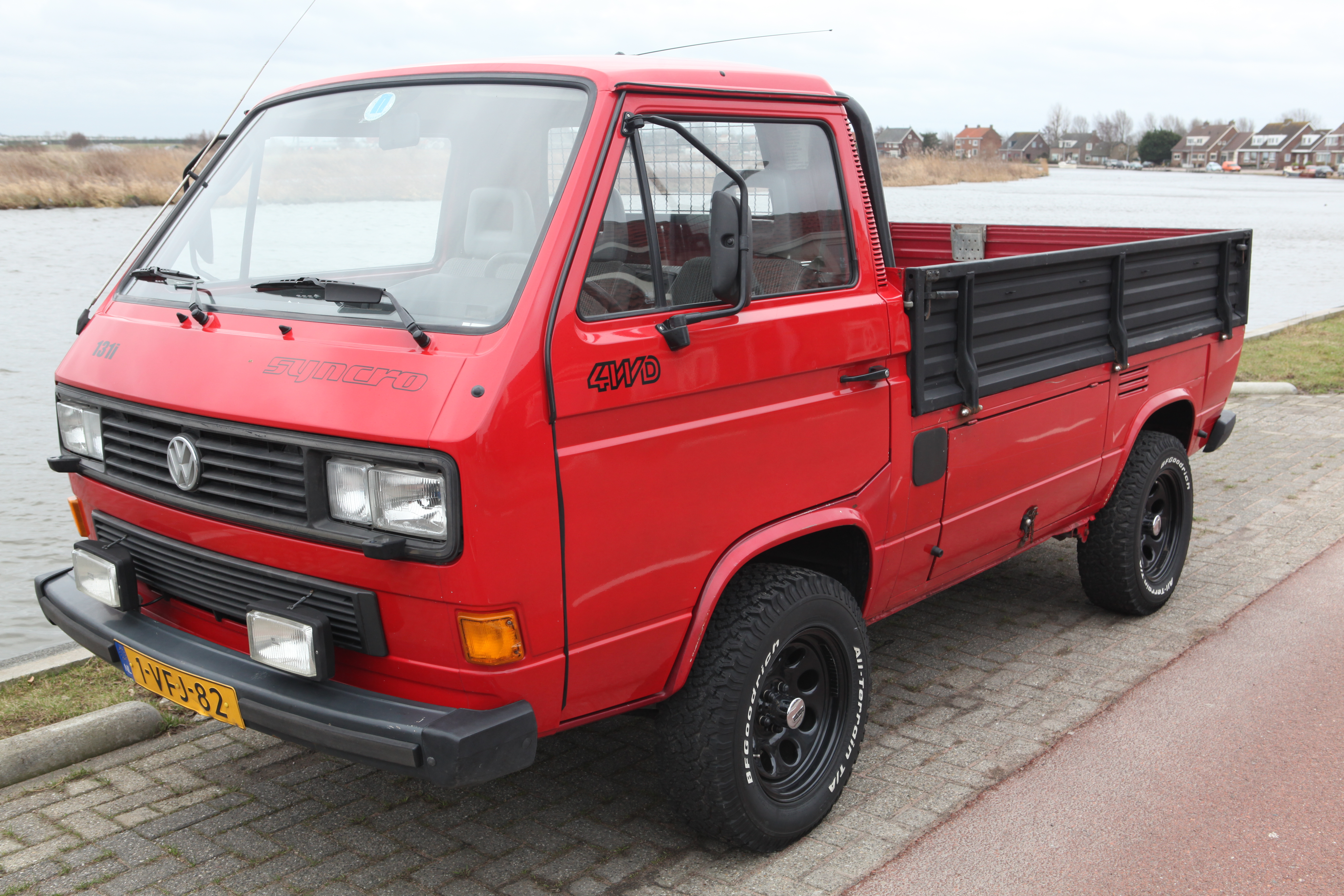
Volkswagen Transporter Syncro 4WD truck

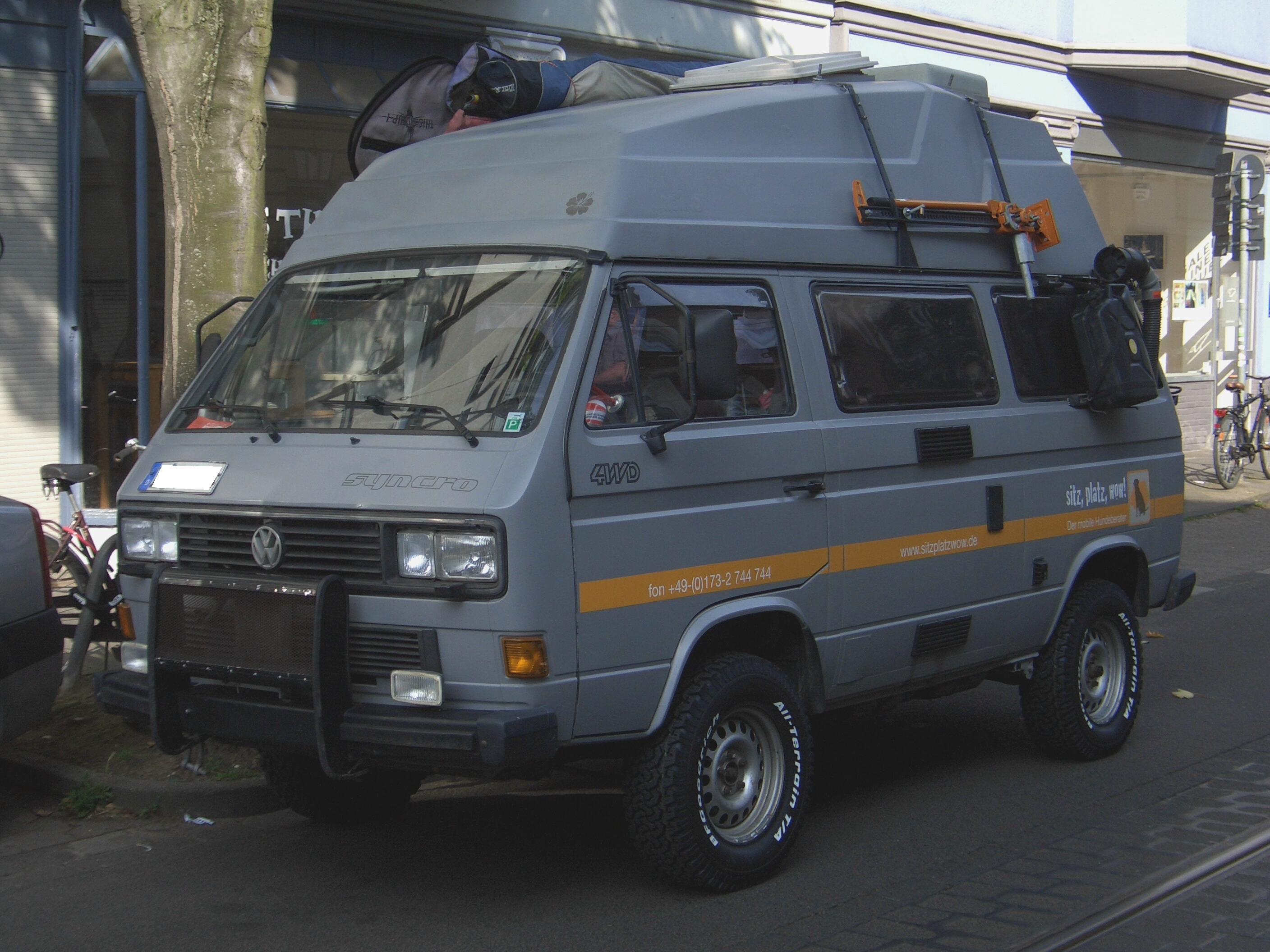
Volkswagen Syncro 4WD Van

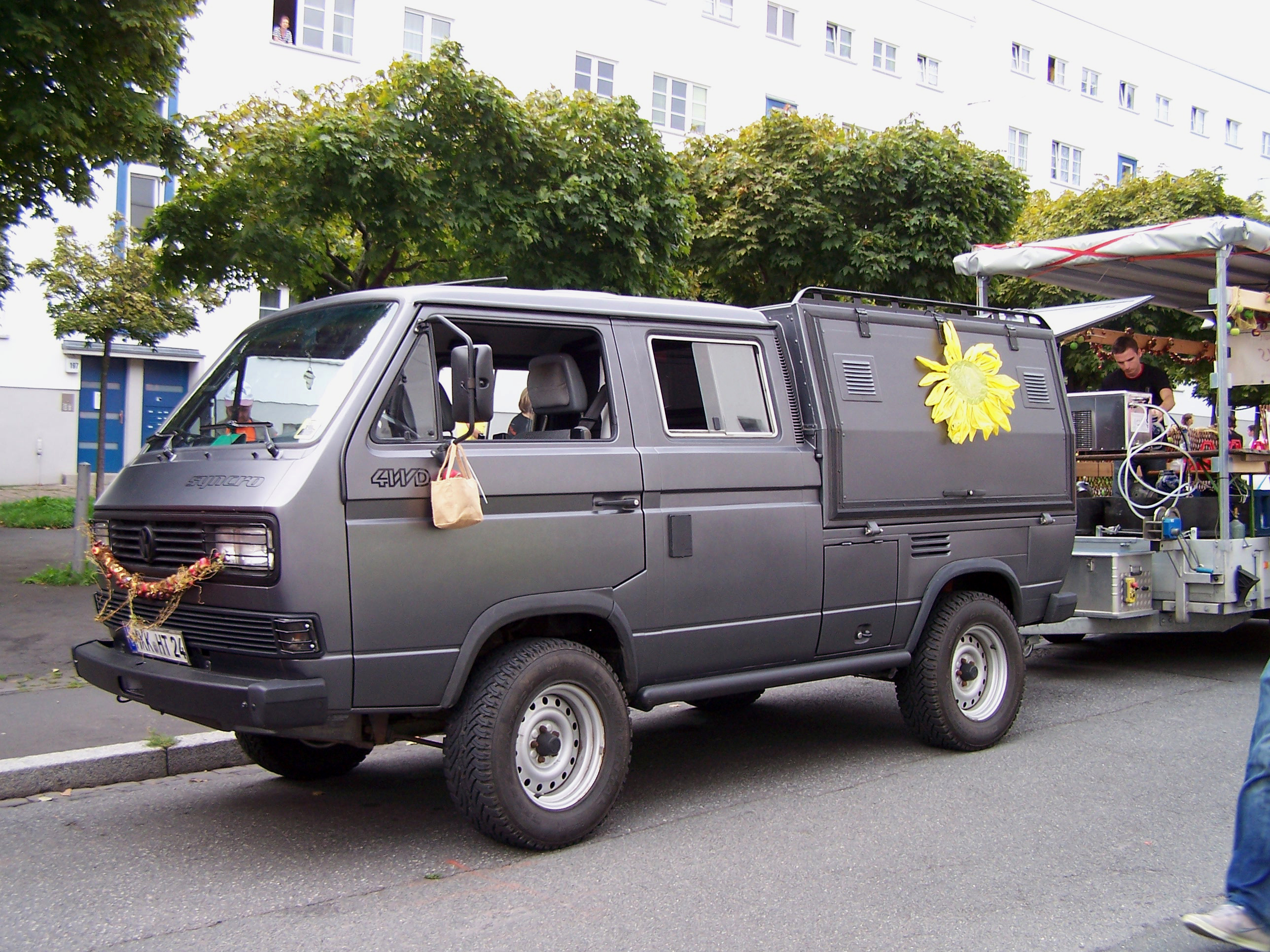
Volkswagen Syncro 4WD

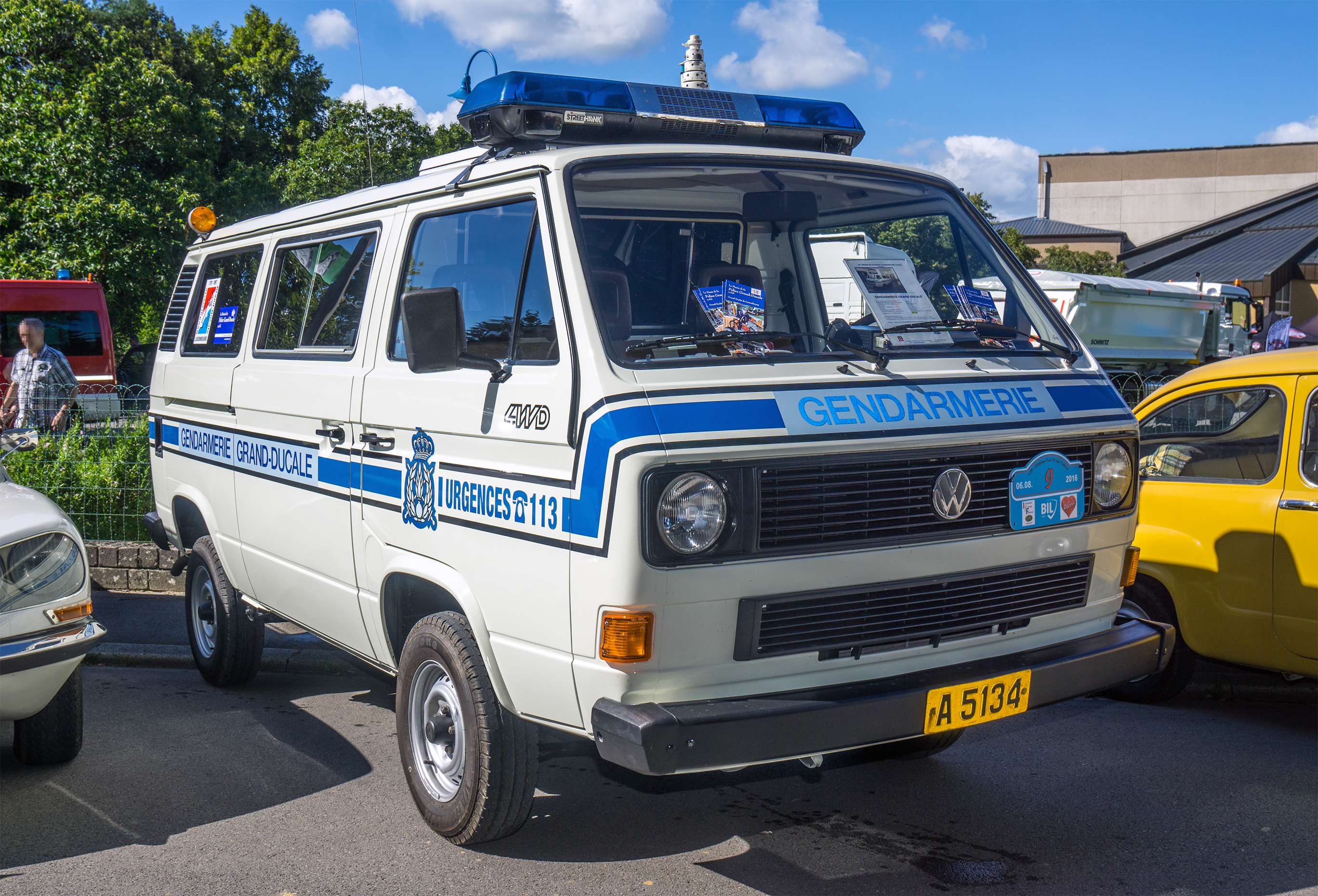
Volkswagen Transporter Syncro 4WD

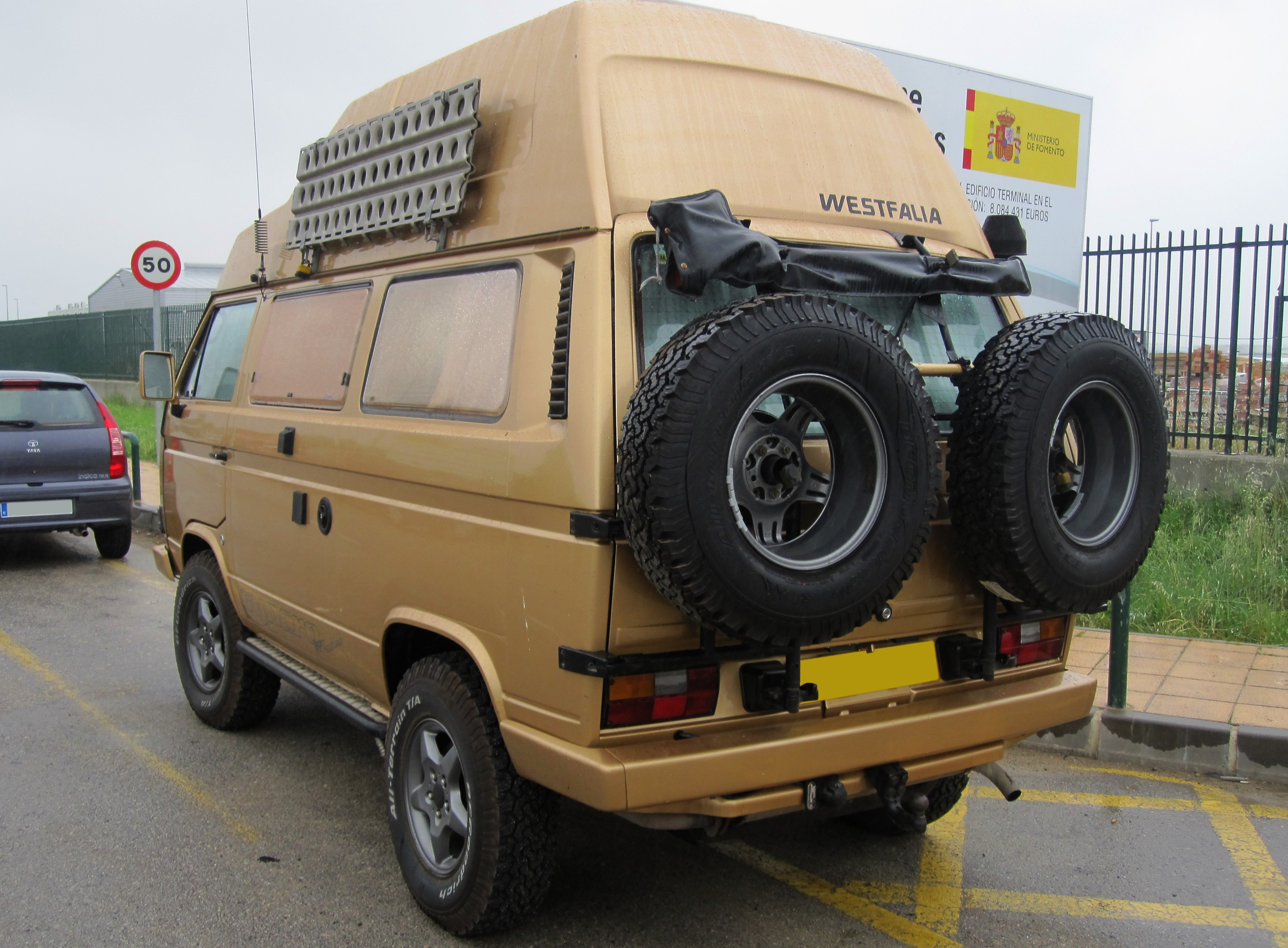
1989 Volkswagen Caravelle Club Westfalia Syncro

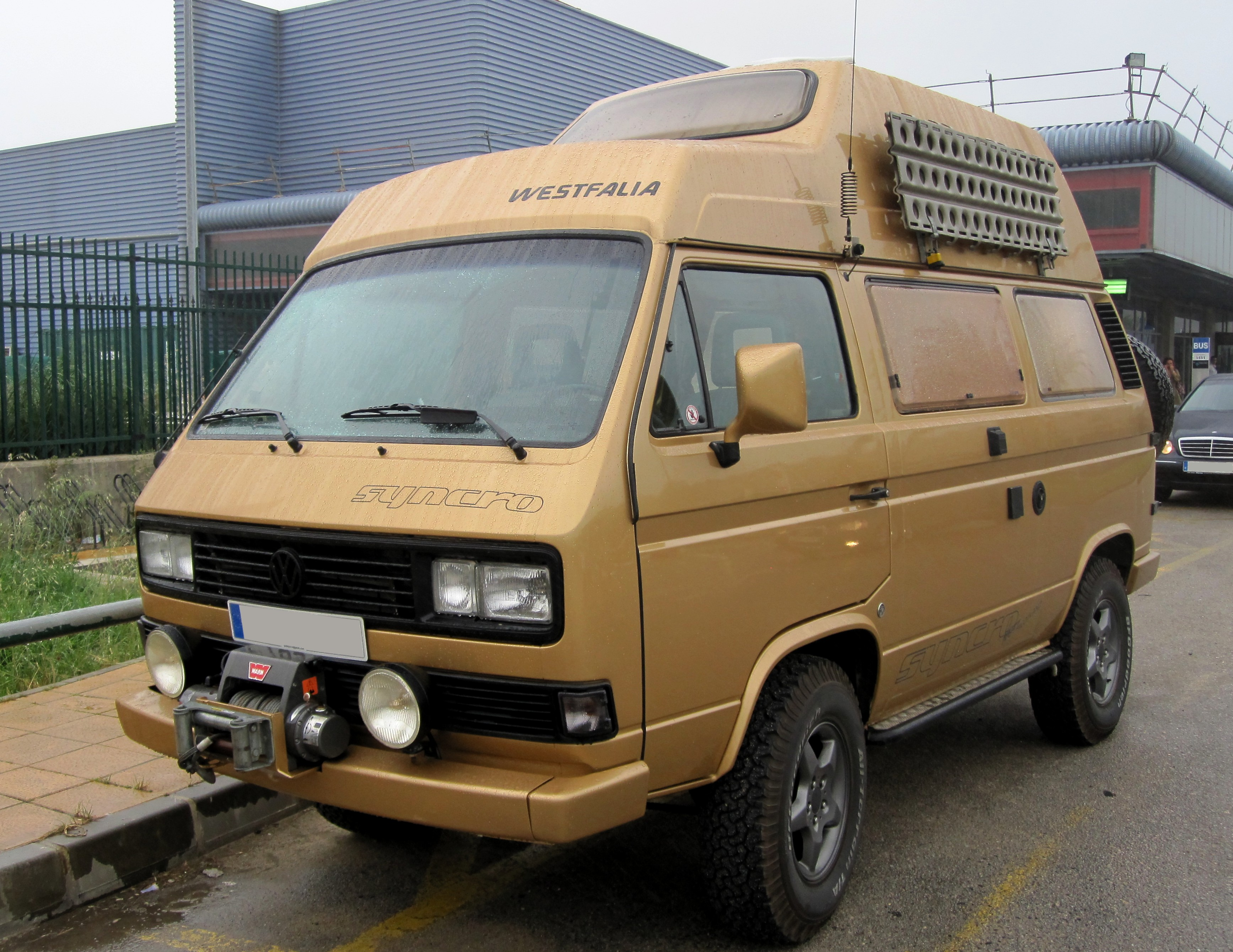
1989 Volkswagen Caravelle Club Westfalia Syncro

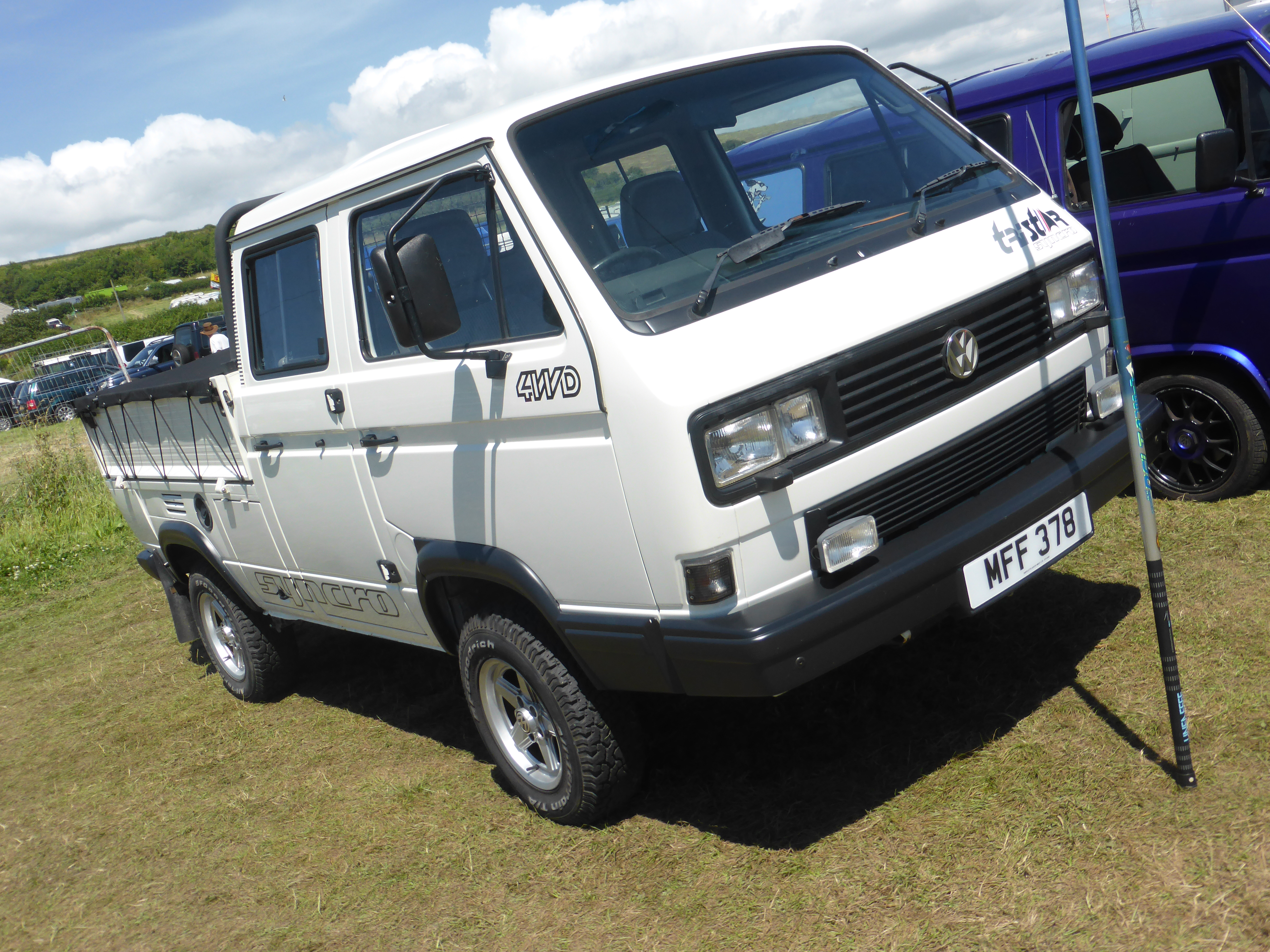
Volkswagen T3 Tristar Syncro (1990)

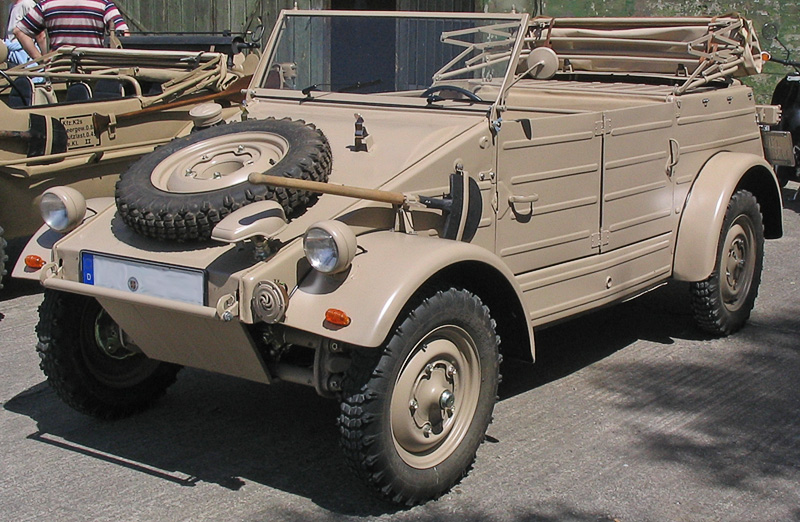
WW2 Volkswagen Kübelwagen

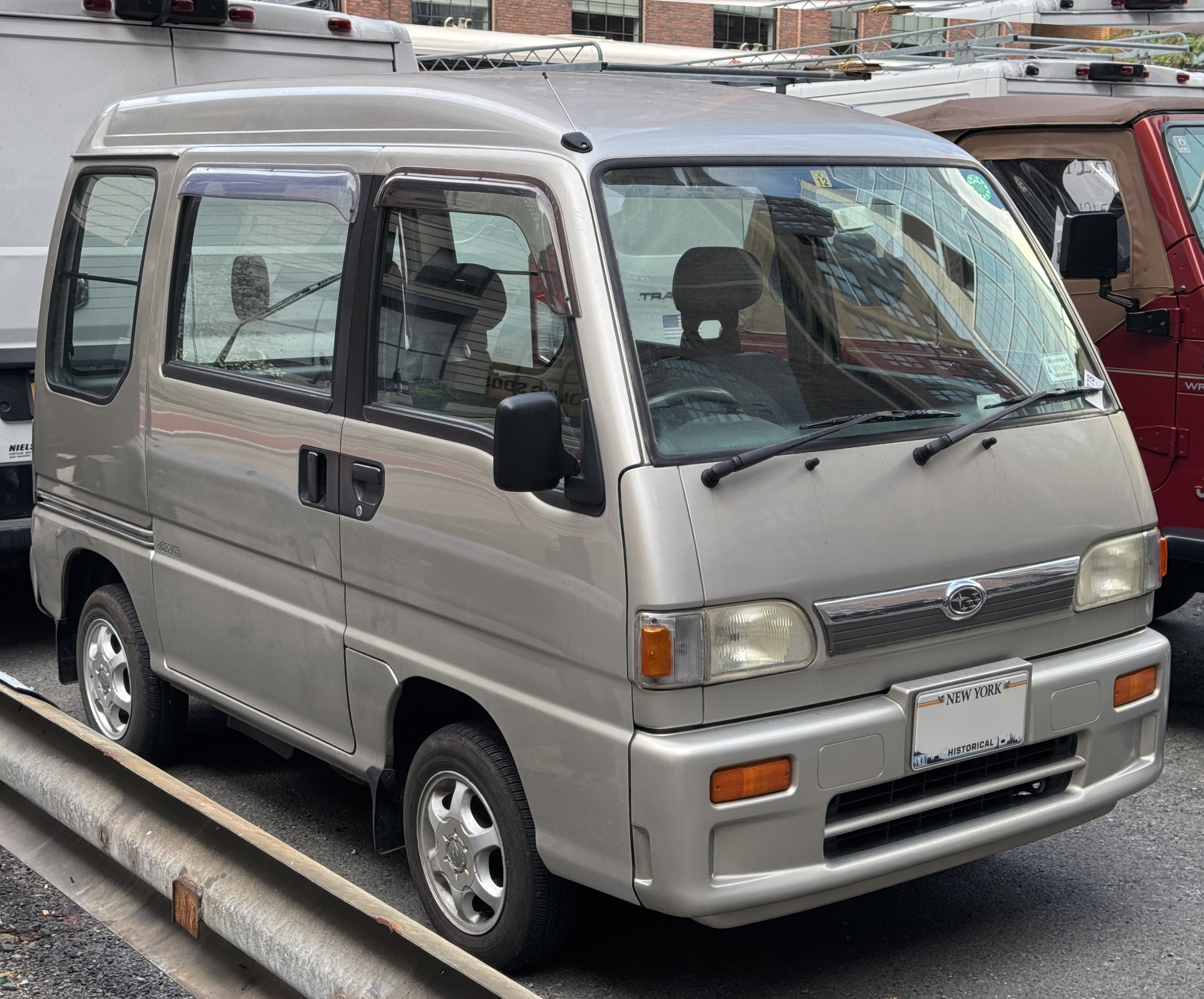
Subaru Sambar 5th Generation (4WD/AWD was available from 1980 to 2014)
