= Porsche 911 (993) =

Fourth generation of the Porsche 911 sports car produced from 1994–1998

Porsche 993
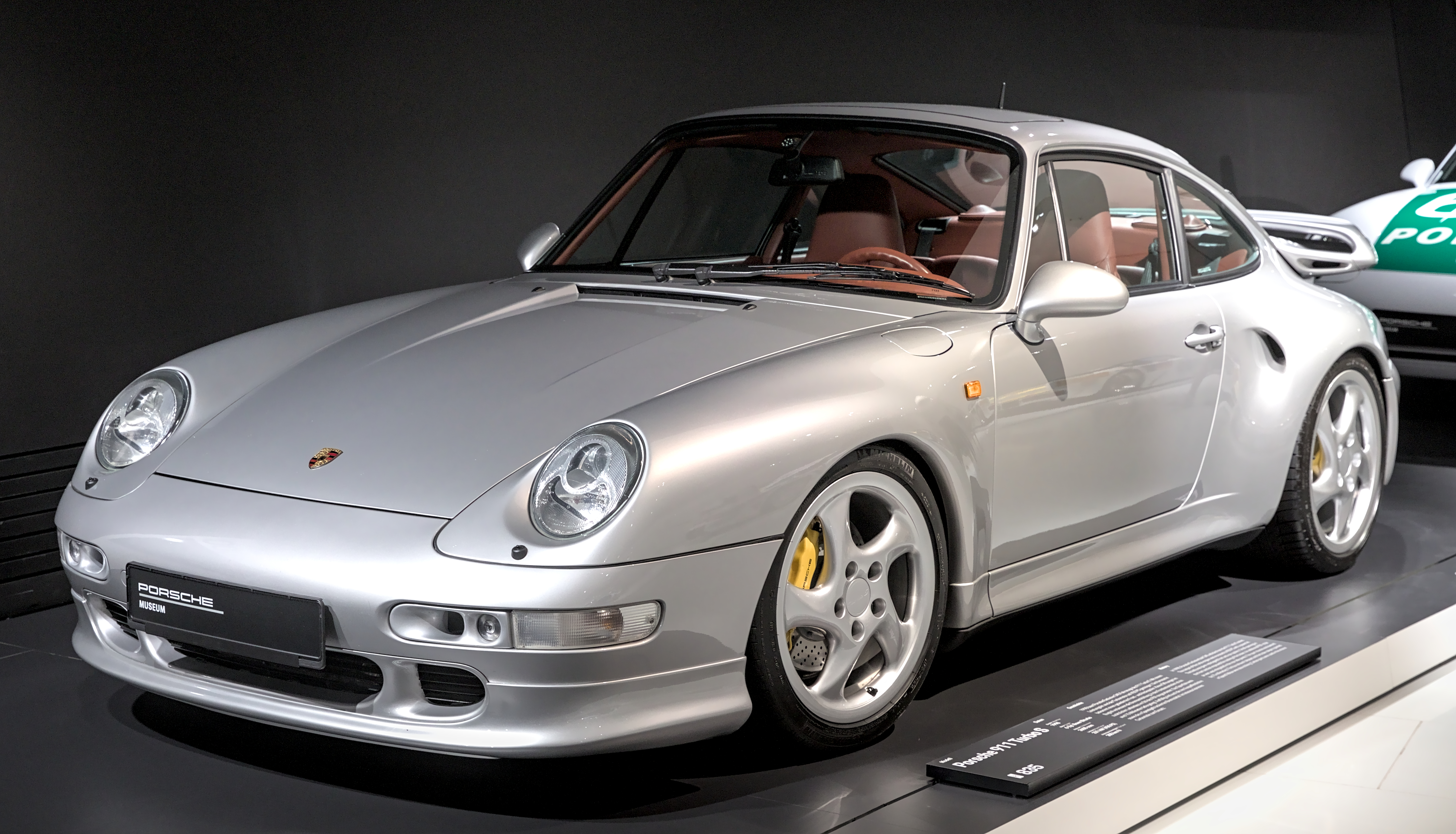
- Porsche 993 Turbo S

Overview
- Manufacturer: Porsche
- Also called: Porsche 911; Porsche Carrera
- Production: January 1994 – March 1998
- Assembly: Germany: Stuttgart, Zuffenhausen
- Designer: Tony Hatter (1991)

Body and chassis
- Class: Sports car (S)
- Body style: 2-door coupé; 2-door convertible; 2-door Targa top; 2-door speedster
- Layout: Rear-engine, rear-wheel-drive/rear-engine, all-wheel drive
- Related: Ruf Turbo R; Ruf CTR2; Ruf BTR2

Powertrain
- Engine: 3.6 L M64 air-cooled SOHC H6; 3.8 L M64/20 air-cooled SOHC H6; 3.6 L M64/60 air-cooled twin-turbo SOHC H6
- Transmission: 4-speed automatic; 5-speed manual; 6-speed manual

Dimensions
- Wheelbase: 89.45 in (2,272 mm)
- Length: 167.7 in (4,260 mm)
- Width: 1994–1998 Coupé: 68.3 in (1,735 mm); 1994–1995 Convertible: 69.9 in (1,775 mm); 1996–1998 Convertible: 70.7 in (1,796 mm)
- Height: 1994–1995: 51.6 in (1,311 mm); Speedster: 50.4 in (1,280 mm); 1996–1998: 51.8 in (1,316 mm)
- Curb weight: Base Coupé: 3,064 lb (1,390 kg)

Chronology
- Predecessor: Porsche 964
- Successor: Porsche 996; Porsche 911 GT3 (for 911 Carrera RS)

The Porsche 911, internally type 993, is the fourth generation of the 911 model of Porsche sports car, manufactured and sold between 1994 and 1998 (model years 1995–1998 in the United States), replacing the 911, type 964. Its discontinuation marked the end of air-cooled 911 models.

The 993 was much improved over and quite different from its predecessor. According to Porsche, "every part of the car was designed from the ground up, including the engine" but nevertheless "only 20% of its parts were carried over from the prior 911". Porsche refers to the 993 as "a significant advance, not just from a technical, but also a visual perspective."

The external design of the Porsche 993 was penned by English designer Tony Hatter. It retained the core cabin and body shell architecture of the 964 and prior 911 model iterations, but exterior panels were revised with much more flared wheel arches, a smoother front and rear bumper design, an enlarged retractable rear wing, and teardrop shaped mirrors.

Porsche engineered a new light-alloy rear subframe with an entirely new multi-link coil springs and wishbone rear suspension design, dubbed the Weissach axle – making significant progress with the engine's impact on the car's handling, putting behind the previous lift-off oversteer and providing an improved driving experience and creating a more civilized car overall.

The 993 had several variants, like its predecessors, varying in body style, engines, drivetrains, and included equipment. Engine power was increased by the addition of the VarioRam system, that added particularly in the mid-range of rpms, and also resulted in more throttle-noise at higher revs. The VarioRam system resulted in a 15 percent increase in the new 911's engine power over its predecessor.

The 993's available all-wheel drive system replaced the 964's centre differential with a viscous coupling, similar to the 959's, making the new system significantly lighter. The 993 was also the first 911 to receive a six speed gearbox, which came standard. Rear-wheel drive models remained available with Porsche's Tiptronic 4-speed automatic transmission.

A 993 GT2 was used as the safety car during the 1995 Formula One season.

== Overview ==
=== Technical improvements ===
A major change was the implementation of all alloy multilink rear suspension attached to an alloy subframe, a completely new design derived from the 989, a four-door sedan that never went into production. The system later continued in the 993's successor, the 996, and required the widening of the rear wheel arches, which gave better stability. The new suspension improved handling, making it more direct, more stable, and helping to reduce the tendency to oversteer if the throttle were lifted during hard cornering, a trait of earlier 911s. It also reduced interior noise and improved ride quality.

The 993 was the first generation of the 911 to have a six-speed manual transmission included as standard; its predecessors had four- or five-speed transmissions. In virtually every situation, keeping the engine at its best torque range above 4,500 rpm was possible. The Carrera, Carrera S, Cabriolet, and Targa models (rear-wheel drive) were available with a "Tiptronic" four-speed automatic transmission, first introduced in the 964. From the 1995 model year, Porsche offered the Tiptronic S with additional steering wheel-mounted controls and refined software for smoother, quicker shifts. Since the 993's introduction, the Tiptronic is capable of recognising climbs and descents. The Tiptronic-equipped cars suffer as compared to the manual transmission equipped cars in both acceleration and also top speed, but the differences are not much notable. Tiptronic cars also suffered a 55 lb (25 kg) increase in weight.

The 993's optional all-wheel drive system was refined over that of the 964. Porsche departed from the 964's setup consisting of three differentials and revised the system based on the layout from its 959 flagship, replacing the centre differential with a viscous coupling unit. In conjunction with the 993's redesigned suspension, this system improved handling characteristics in inclement weather and still retained the stability offered by all-wheel drive without having to suffer as many compromises as the previous all-wheel drive system. Its simpler layout also reduced weight, though the four-wheel drive Carrera 4 weighs 111 lb (50 kg) more than its rear-wheel drive counterpart (at 3,131 lb (1,420 kg) vs. 3,020 lb (1,370 kg)).

Other improvements over the 964 include a new dual-flow exhaust system, larger brakes with drilled discs, and a revised power steering.

== Variants ==
=== Carrera coupé / cabriolet ===
The Carrera was available in rear- and all-wheel drive versions. It was equipped with the naturally aspirated 3.6-litre M64 engine, further developed from the 964, and combined with a new dual-flow exhaust system now incorporating two catalytic converters. The 993 Carrera originally was equipped with orange turn indicators on the front, side, and rear, black brake calipers, black Carrera logo on the rear, and 16-inch alloy wheels with black Porsche logos on the center wheelcaps. The 1994 coupé version had a curb weight of 1,370 kg (3,020 lb) (basic unladen weight of 1,270 kg (2,800 lb)). This model's ground clearance was 110 mm, except for the US version, which had a ground clearance of 120 mm. This was further lowered with the M030 sport chassis option to 90 mm. The coupé is the stiffest, tightest, most solid, yet lightest of the 993 models.

The Cabriolet, introduced simultaneously alongside the coupé in April 1994 for the 1995 model year, featured a fully electrical and hand-stitched soft top reinforced with metal sheets and an automatic wind blocker. On the rear of the Cabriolet, a small spoiler was mounted with the third braking light. The 993 Cabriolet was slightly heavier than the coupé variant and has a curb weight of 1,420 kg (3,131 lb). A high percentage of the total Cabriolets produced ended up in the US. Both the coupé and convertible variants of the 993 were available with all-wheel drive.

Porsche also offered the 993 Carrera as an all-wheel drive version called the Carrera 4. In contrast with the 964, Porsche deleted the "2" from the rear-wheel drive "Carrera" name tag. Among enthusiasts, though, to differentiate between the rear-wheel and all-wheel drive variants of the Type 993 Carrera, they were (and still are) commonly referred to as "C2" and "C4". The Carrera 4 has an automatic braking differential; it brakes the inner wheel when accelerating out of a corner. On the exterior, the Carrera 4 is visually distinguishable by clear front and side turn indicators and rear red turn indicators. The brake calipers are painted silver, as is the Carrera 4 badge on the engine cover. The center wheel-caps carry the Carrera 4 logo instead of the Porsche crest. The Carrera 4 has a curb weight of 1,420 kg (3,131 lb), same as the standard Carrera cabriolet, and in both instances more than the Carrera coupé. Key feature on the 993 Carrera 4 is the weight saving in the all-wheel-drive system as compared to the 964, a lower maintenance viscous coupling unit that transfers 5-50% of power to the front wheels and changes the driving behavior of the car compared to the standard Carrera. The 993 Carrera 4 all-wheel drive is suited to cope with bad weather conditions, which provides extra security in rain or snow, though on a dry circuit, the C2 is the faster car, and the C4 is of course heavier than the C2. There was no Tiptronic option available on the Carrera 4.

The options list for the 993 Carrera (and most other variants) offered many choices, including up to five different styles of wheels, various suspension set-ups, and three different seat styles (comfort, sport, racing). In addition, many upholstery options were offered and various sound systems including digital sound processing. Further, customers had the option of any colour other than standard shades. Even more, the Tequipment and Exclusive-Programs added further options and built to order almost any specific wishes of customers such as special consoles, fax machines, or even brightly coloured interior upholstery.

In contrast with most of the other variants, production of the Carrera coupé and Cabriolet ceased with the end of a very small number produced in a shortened 1998 model year.

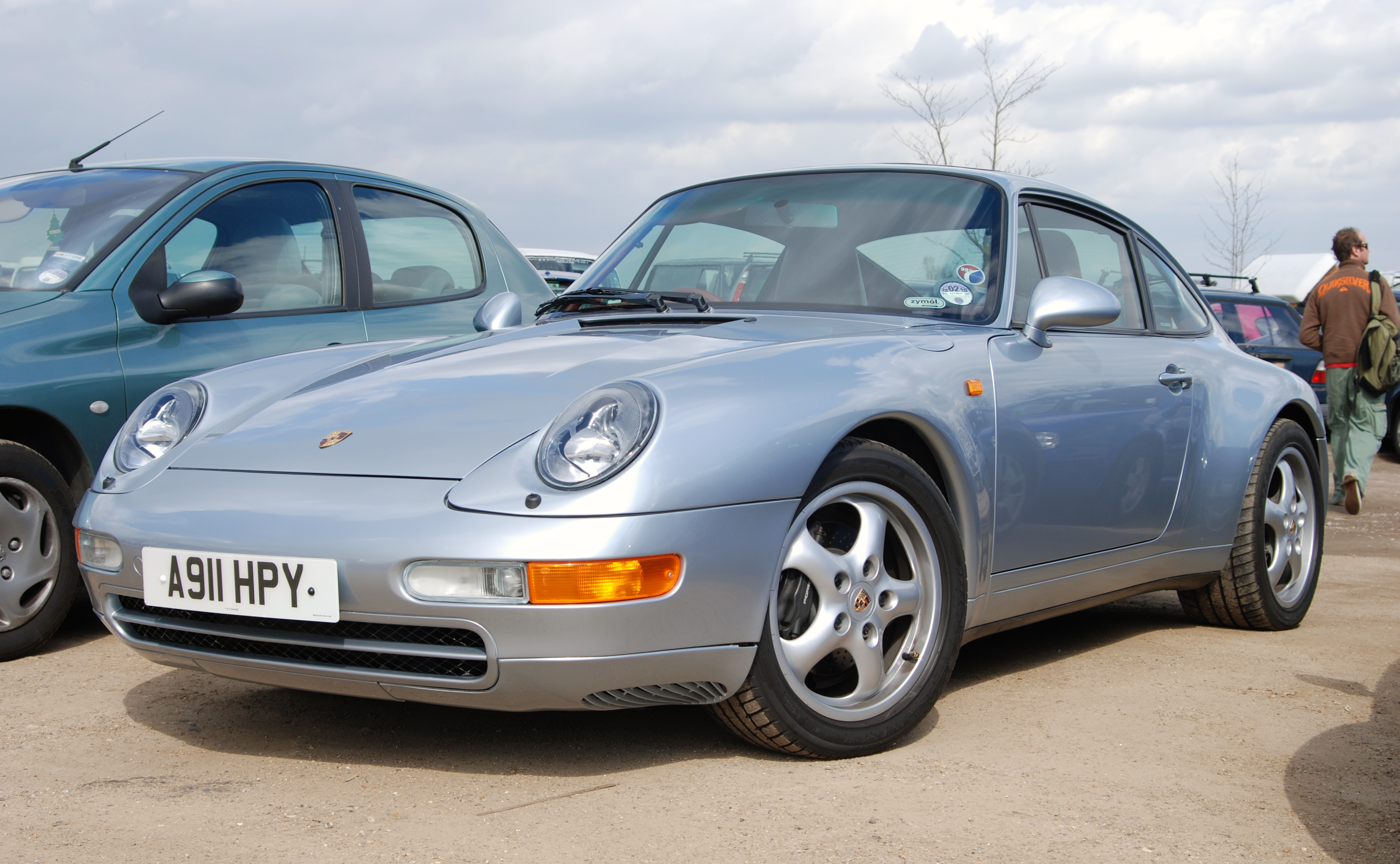
Porsche 911 (993) Carrera coupé

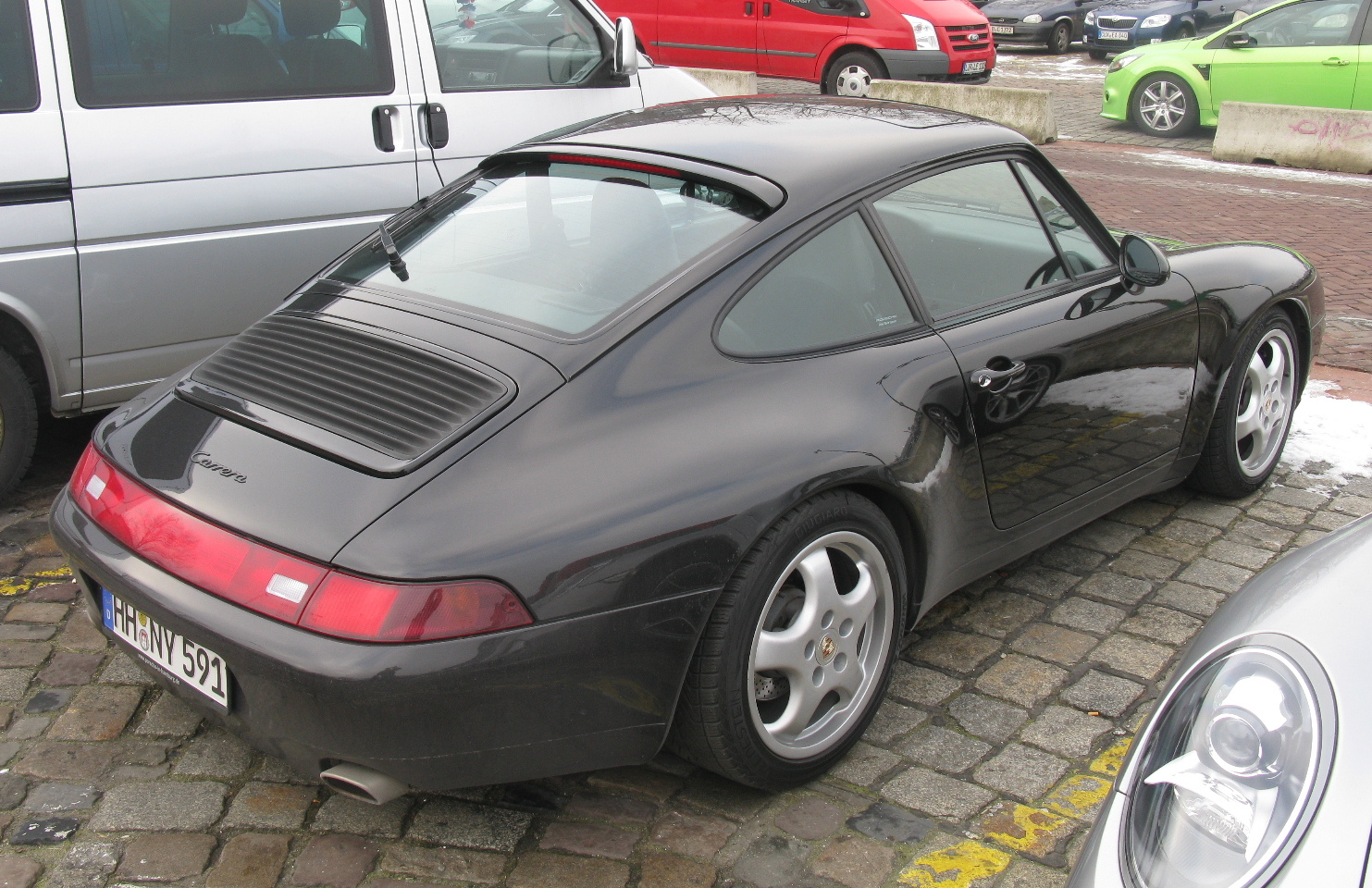
Rear view of coupé

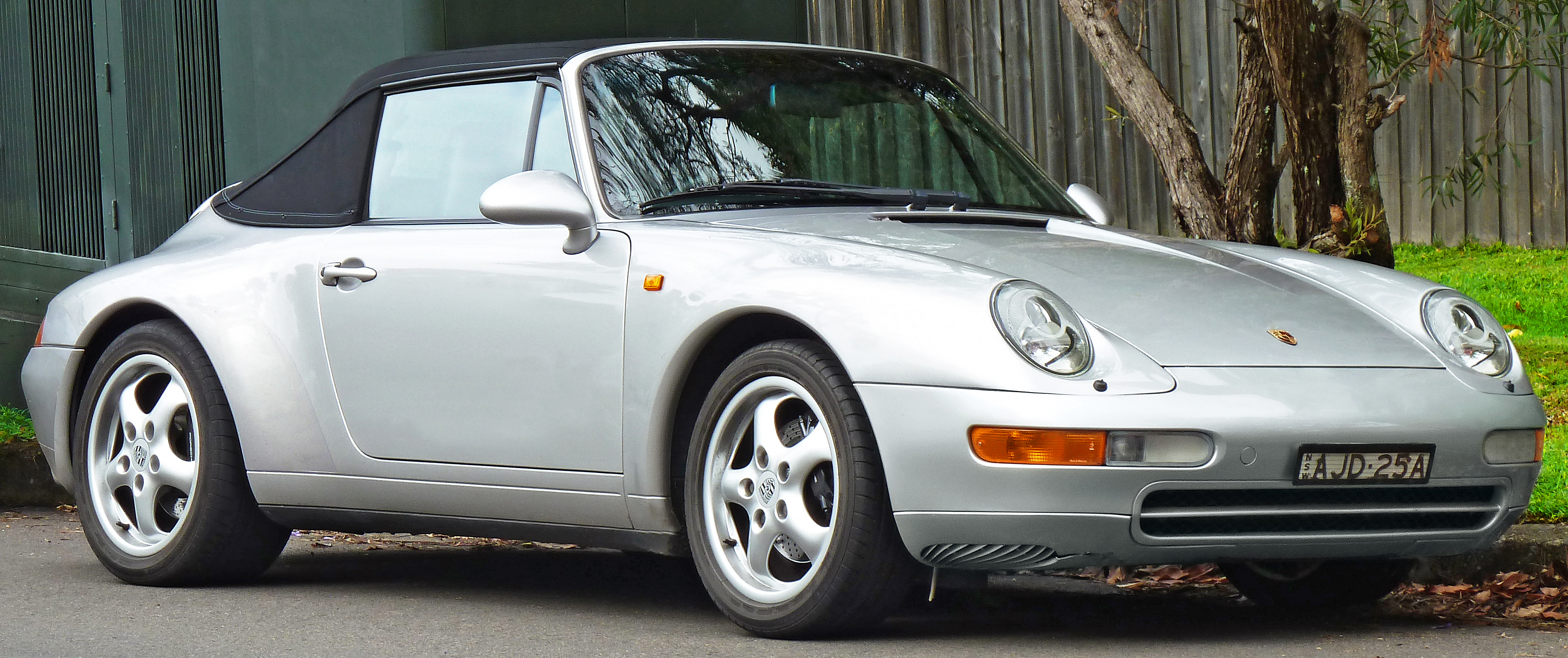
1994–1997 Porsche 911 Carrera (993) cabriolet

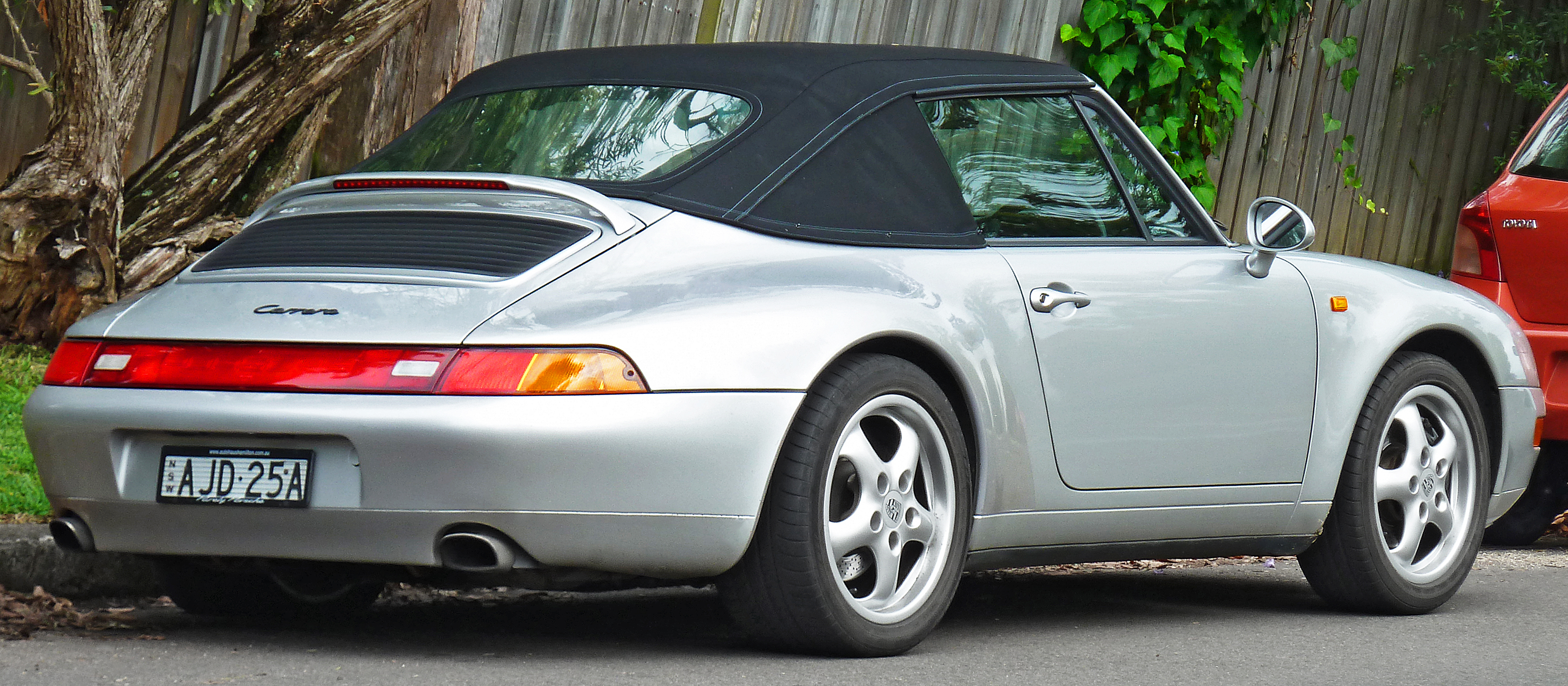
Rear view of cabriolet

=== Targa ===
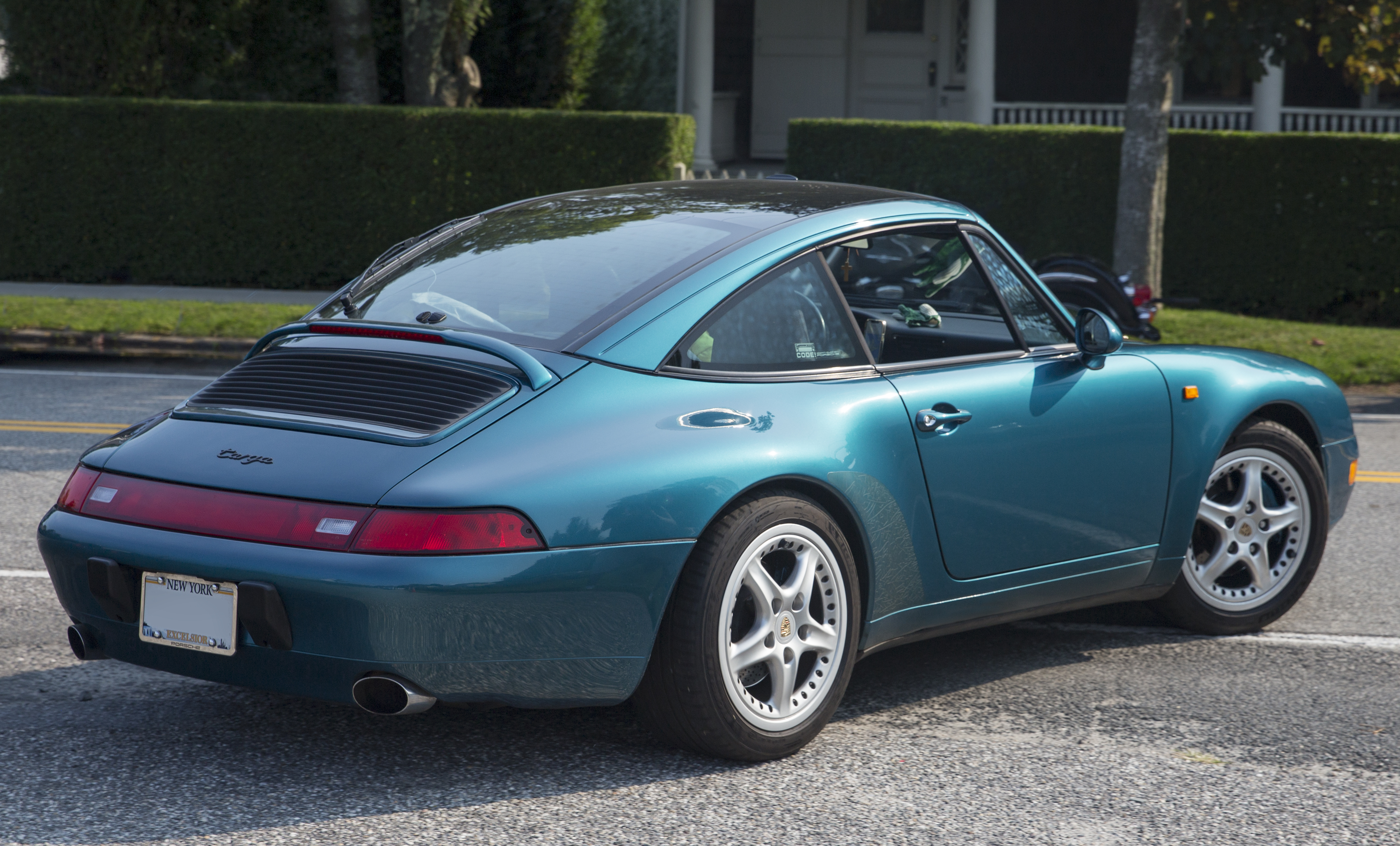
Porsche 993 Targa (Europe; 1996)

The Targa version of the 993 was introduced in the 1996 model year and was the debut of the so-called "greenhouse" system - a retractable glass roof, a design continued on the 996 and 997 Targa. The glass roof retracts underneath the rear window, revealing a large opening. This system was a complete redesign, as previous Targa models had a removable roof section and a wide B-pillar functioning as a roll bar. The new glass-roof design allowed the 993 Targa to retain the same side-on profile as the other 911 Carrera variants and finish without the inconvenience of storing the removed top of the old system. The Targa is based on the 993 Carrera cabriolet with the Targa glass roof replacing the fabric roof.

The Targa was equipped with distinctive two-piece 17-inch (430 mm) wheels, which could be ordered as an option on all cars not having standard 18-inch (460 mm) wheels. Common problems with the Targa include excessive heat in the cabin, creaking noises on rough roads, and a very complicated and unreliable roof mechanism. In addition, the Targa roof is heavier than the coupé's roof, and that extra weight is at the top of the car, raising its center of gravity and decreasing handling performance.

Targa production numbers:

- 1996: 2,442 (US+Canada: 462)
- 1997: 1,843 (US+Canada: 567)
- 1998: 334 (US+Canada: 122)
- Total: 4,619

=== Turbo ===
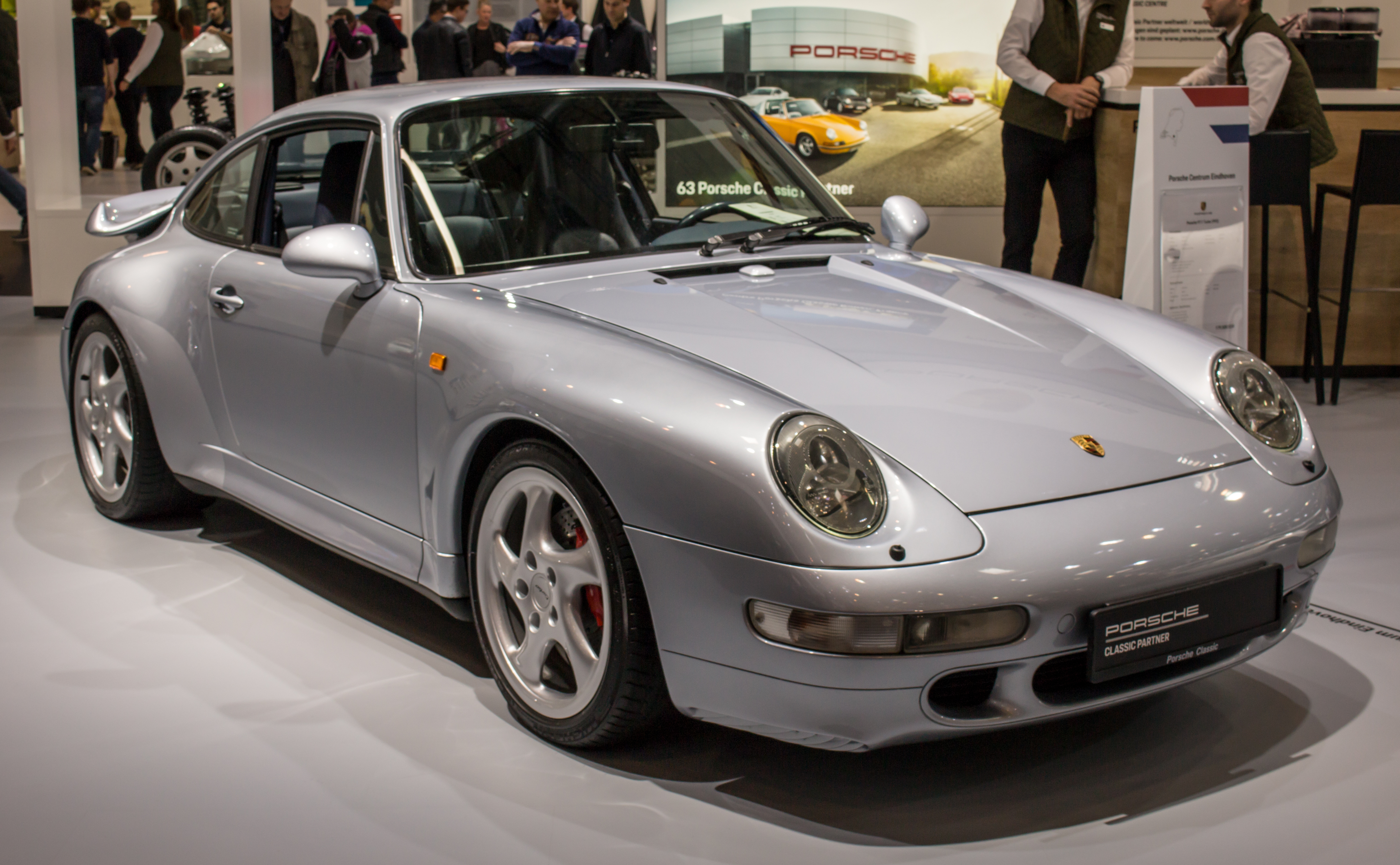

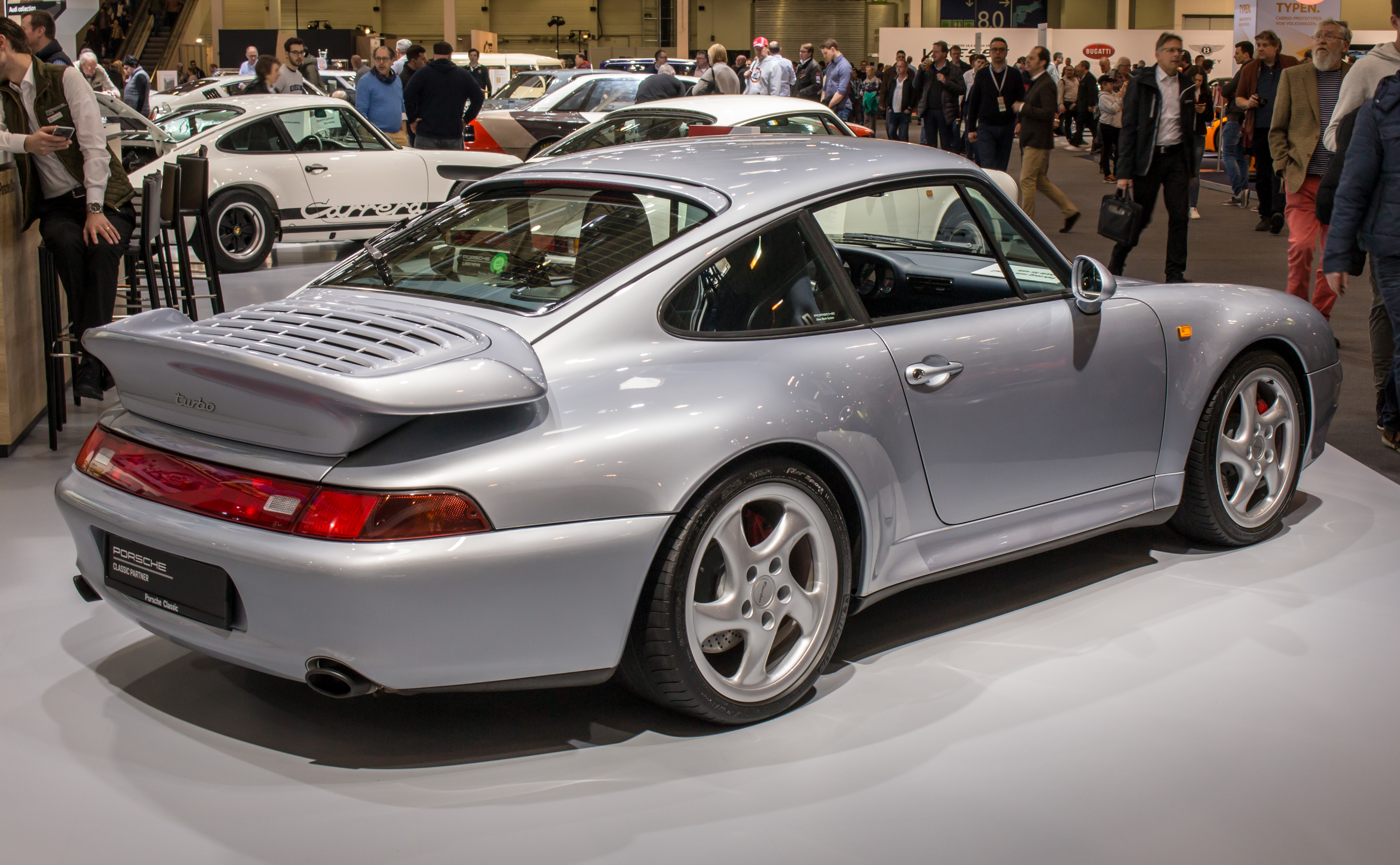
Porsche 993 Turbo

The 993 Turbo coupé was introduced in 1995. It featured a new twin-turbocharged engine displacing 3.6 litres and generating a maximum power output of 300 kW (408 PS; 402 hp). Air-to-air intercoolers, electronic engine management, redesigned cylinder heads, and other modified engine internals completed the new engine. The 993 Turbo was the first 911 Turbo with all-wheel drive, taken from the 959 flagship model. The Turbo's bodywork differs from the Carrera by widened rear wheel arches (about 6 cm), redesigned front and rear bumper moldings, and a fixed "whale tail" rear wing housing the intercoolers. New 18-inch (460 mm) alloy wheels with hollow spokes were standard.

The 993 Turbo was one of the first production cars in the world to have an OBDII diagnostics system (the 3.8-litre and GT versions did not have that system, and the normally aspirated 993 variants did not receive it until 1996 model year). The successors of the 993 Turbo since have had water-cooled heads. The car also had larger brakes than those on the base Carrera model.

Throughout the production run of the Turbo, two distinct differences existed. The 1997 and 1998 cars had these differences from the 1996 cars:

- Stronger transmission input shafts (a known weakness due to the combination of immense power and AWD system) were used.
- The ECU was able to be flashed and modified (the 1996 model's ECU was not modifiable).
- With the addition of a Porsche child seat, the passenger airbag was cut off.
- Motion sensors for the alarm were integrated into the map light above the rear view mirror.
- Standard wheel center caps had "turbo" embedded on them (the 1996 version had Porsche crests).

The Porsche 993 Turbo is featured in Need For Speed: High Stakes as the flagship car of the game.

=== Turbo S ===
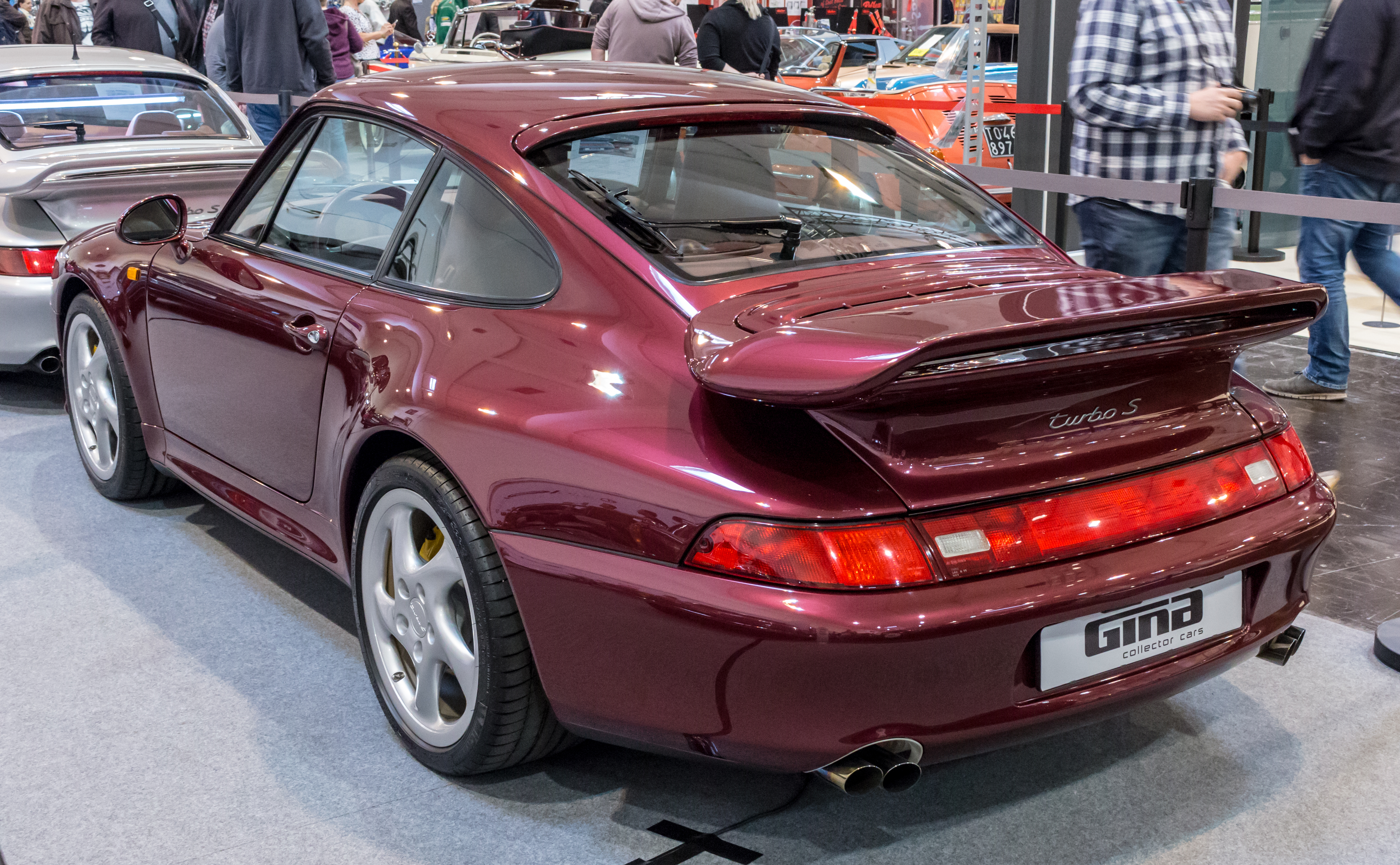
Porsche 993 Turbo S

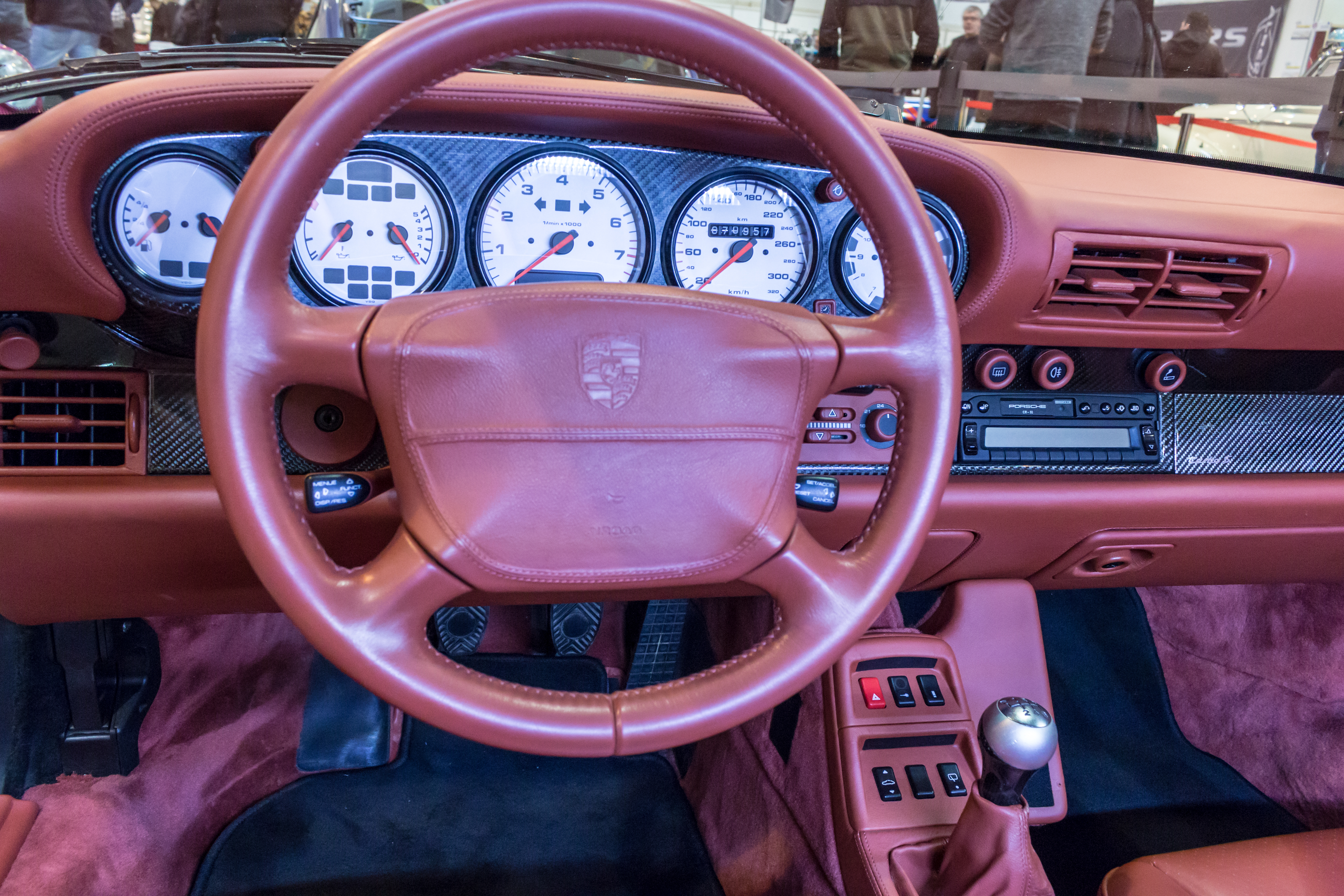
The 993 Turbo S had carbon-fibre and leather interior trim

During the second-to-last year of production of the 993 (1997), Porsche offered the 993 Turbo S, which was manufactured by Porsche Exclusiv department. The Turbo S is a high-specification Turbo including a power upgrade to 450 PS DIN (331 kW), achieved through the use of larger Triple K K-24 turbochargers, an additional oil cooler, and a modified Motronic engine management system. American market cars produced 424 hp SAE (316 kW; 430 PS). The inclusion of extras including carbon fibre decoration in the interior makes it different from the earlier lightweight, spartan 964 Turbo S. The 993 Turbo S is recognized by yellow brake calipers, a slightly larger rear wing, a quad-pipe exhaust system, a front spoiler with brake-cooling ducts (on European market cars), carbon fibre door sills with 'Turbo S' badging, and air scoops behind the doors. This was the last of the air-cooled 911 Turbos. The curb weight of the car amounted to 1,500 kg (3,307 lb).

Performance figures include a 0–97 km/h (60 mph) acceleration time of 3.6 seconds, 0–161 km/h (100 mph) acceleration time of 8.9 seconds and a top speed of 296.6 km/h (184.3 mph).

=== Carrera 4S / Carrera S ===
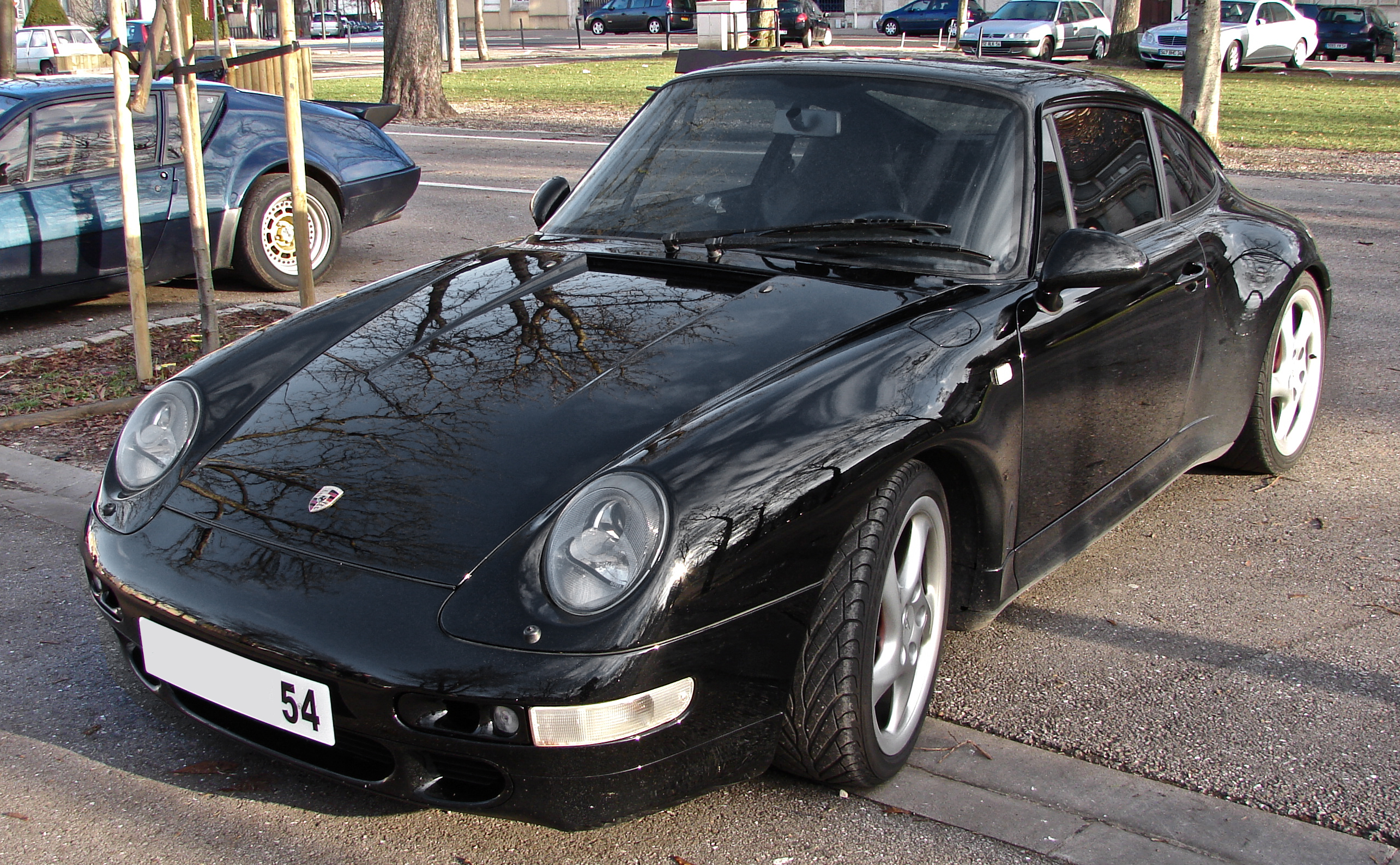

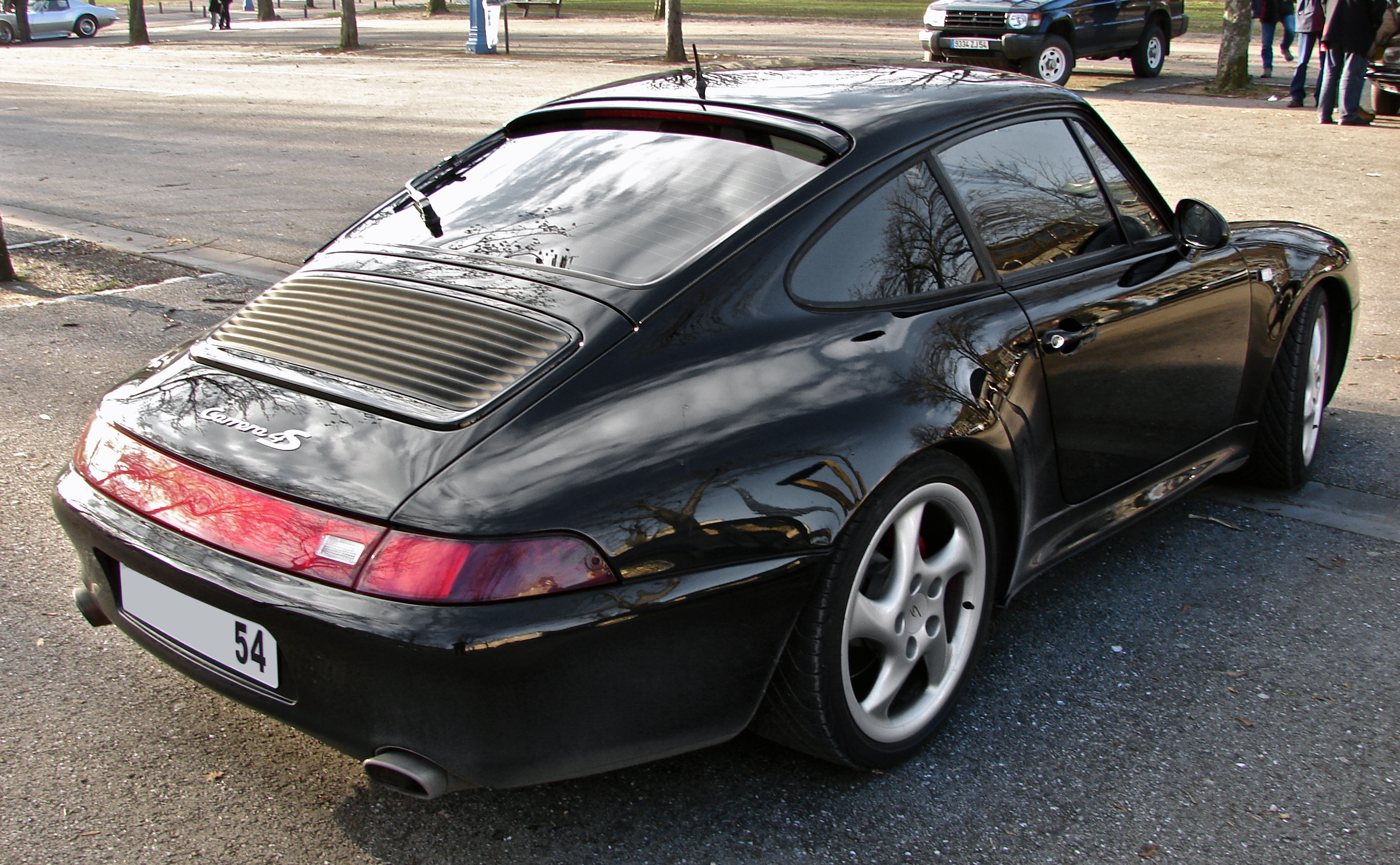
Porsche 911 (993) Carrera 4S

The Carrera 4 S (1996) and the later rear-wheel drive Carrera S (1997) shared the Turbo model's bodyshell, but housed the naturally aspirated engine in the rear. Both of the S models had slightly lowered suspension as compared to standard Carrera models. The all-wheel drive 4S is heavier than the S due to the former's all-wheel drive system, resulting in a curb weight of 1,427 kg (3,147 lb) for the C4S vs. 1,390 kg (3,064 lb) for the C2S. Due to this, the S has a quicker acceleration time and a slightly greater top speed than the 4S. Although a Carrera S Cabriolet was never officially offered by the factory, a small number (believed to be five) were specially ordered through the Porsche Exclusiv department in 1997 and sold as 1998 models by Beverly Hills Porsche in California and a single example was ordered by a VIP client through Porsche Exclusiv department for the European market. The wide bodywork is widely acclaimed for its rear looks; it creates more aerodynamic drag, leading to slightly lower top speeds compared to the narrower siblings (about 5 km/h), but the wider tyres result in excellent road holding. The Carrera S is one of the most valuable 993 variants. Production of the Carrera S amounted to 1,752 examples for all of North America during the entire 993 series production run, in part because they were manufactured only for the 1997 model year together with a very brief stub period later in 1997, denominated as 1998 models. While unusual, the special limited run models such as the 993 RS, GT, and Turbo S are both rarer and more expensive.

The last 993 and therefore last air-cooled 911 ever produced for public road use was a Riviera Blue Carrera 4 S, completed March 31st, 1998 owned by American TV star Jerry Seinfeld. Seinfeld also ordered the last US bound 993, a black Carrera 2 S completed in December 1997.

=== Carrera RS ===
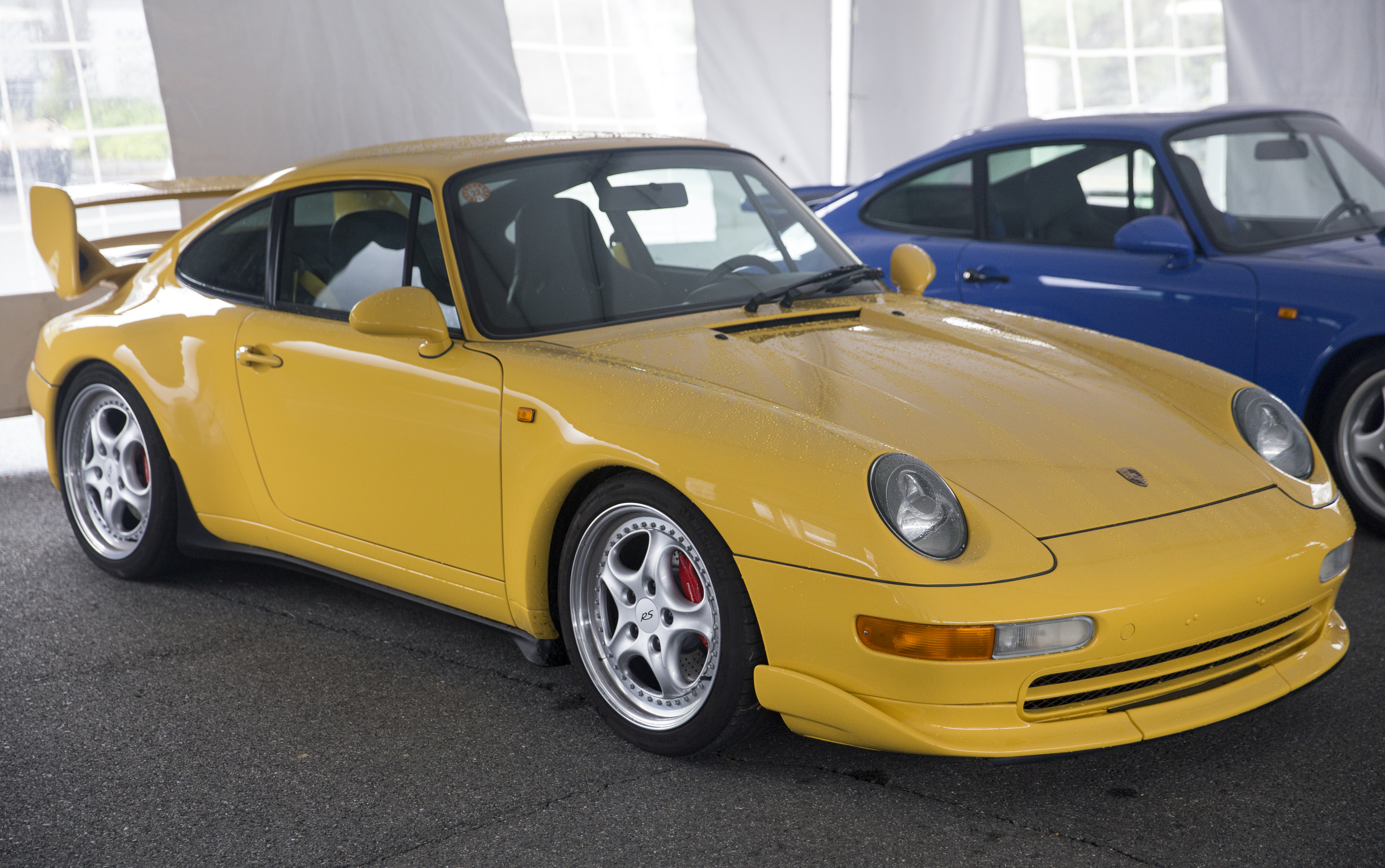
Porsche 911 (993) Carrera RS with the optional Club Aero Package

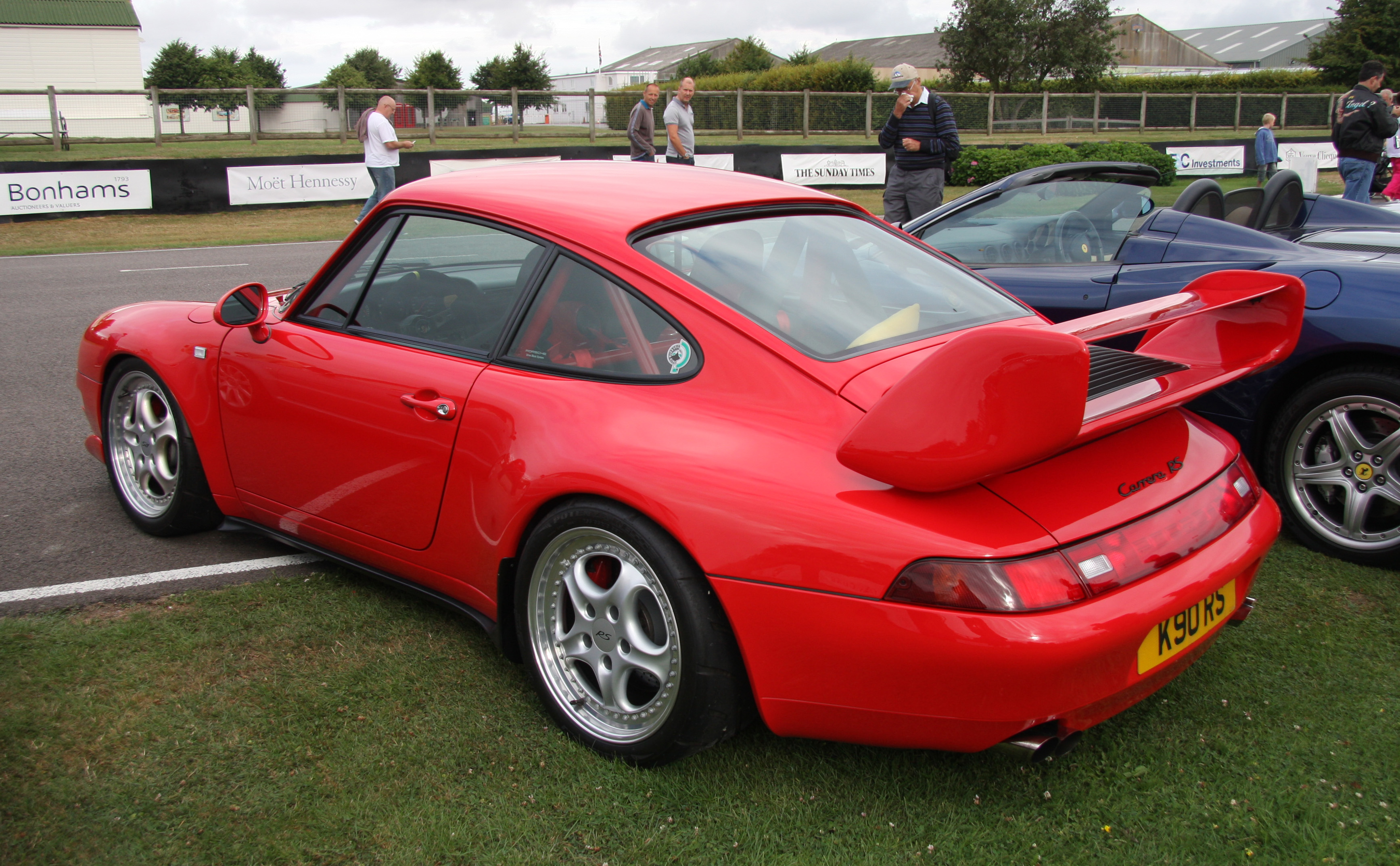
Porsche 911 (993) Carrera RS Clubsport

The Carrera RS is a lightweight variant of the Carrera built in 1995 and 1996. It features a naturally aspirated 3.8-litre engine generating a maximum power output of 300 PS (221 kW; 296 hp) achieved by the use of lightweight forged pistons, dual oil coolers, big intake valves, Varioram variable-length intake manifold, a modified Bosch Motronic engine management system, and lightened rocker arms. The six-speed G50/31 manual gearbox with a short shifter used on the Carrera RS had modified gear ratios for the first three gears. The larger 322 mm cross drilled and ventilated discs brakes front and aft with four piston calipers were shared with the 911 Turbo and limited-slip differential was included as standard equipment. The exterior is easily distinguishable from a normal Carrera by a large fixed rear wing, small front flaps, and three-piece 18-inch (457 mm) aluminum wheels. The headlight washers were deleted for weight saving reasons. A seam-welded body shell with an aluminum bonnet supported with a single strut was used along with thinner glass. On the interior, the rear seats were removed, and special racing seats along with spartan door cards were installed. Sound proofing was also reduced to a minimum. The suspension system used Bilstein dampers and the ride height was lowered for improved handling. Adjustable front and rear antiroll bars and an under-bonnet strut brace further increased handling. The final weight of the car was 1,280 kg (2,822 lb).

The Clubsport (option code M003) was a track-oriented iteration of the Carrera RS with relatively limited road usability. The Clubsport came equipped with a welded roll cage, suspension strut brace, lightweight composite bucket seats, and racing harnesses. Certain comfort features such as carpets, power windows, air conditioning, and radio were deleted. The exterior sports a larger rear wing and a deeper chin spoiler than the standard RS. The gearbox ratios were also changed, with a shorter 4th, 5th and 6th gear and a shorter throw gear lever.

The Carrera RS was street legal in Europe and most other markets, but was not approved for import to the United States. Production amounted to 1,014 cars, including 227 Clubsport variants.

A RSR variant was available for customers who wanted to go racing. The RSR 3.8 was developed by the Porsche motorsport department specifically to support Porsche customer race team entries in to International Endurance events like the American IMSA GT series and European GT series. Porsche Motorsport produced 45 of these. A number of these cars were assembled into 1998, some purportedly as late as the late summer and early fall, making these cars the last air-cooled 911s made by Porsche.

=== GT2 ===
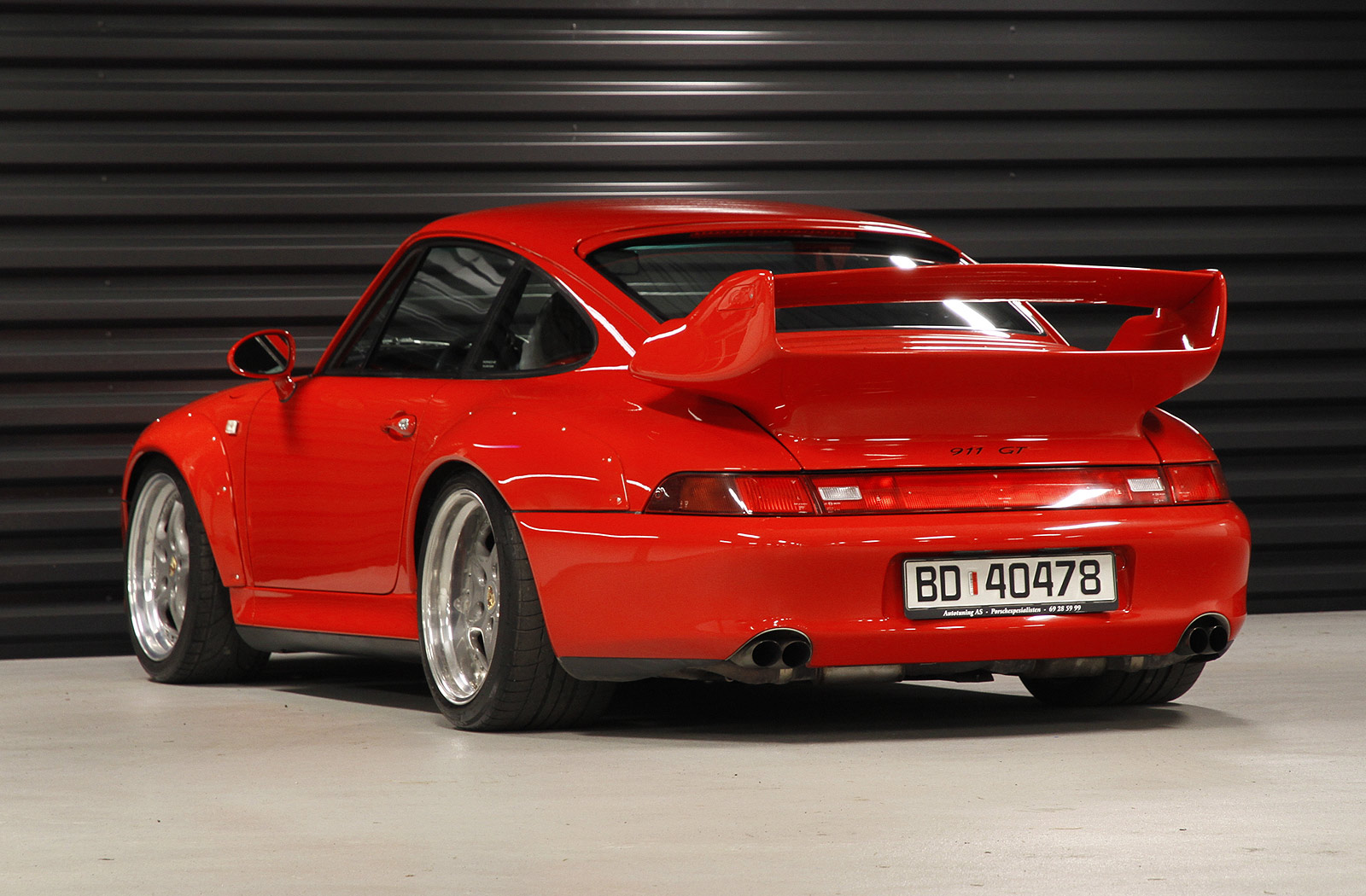
The Porsche 993 GT2 features a prominent rear wing

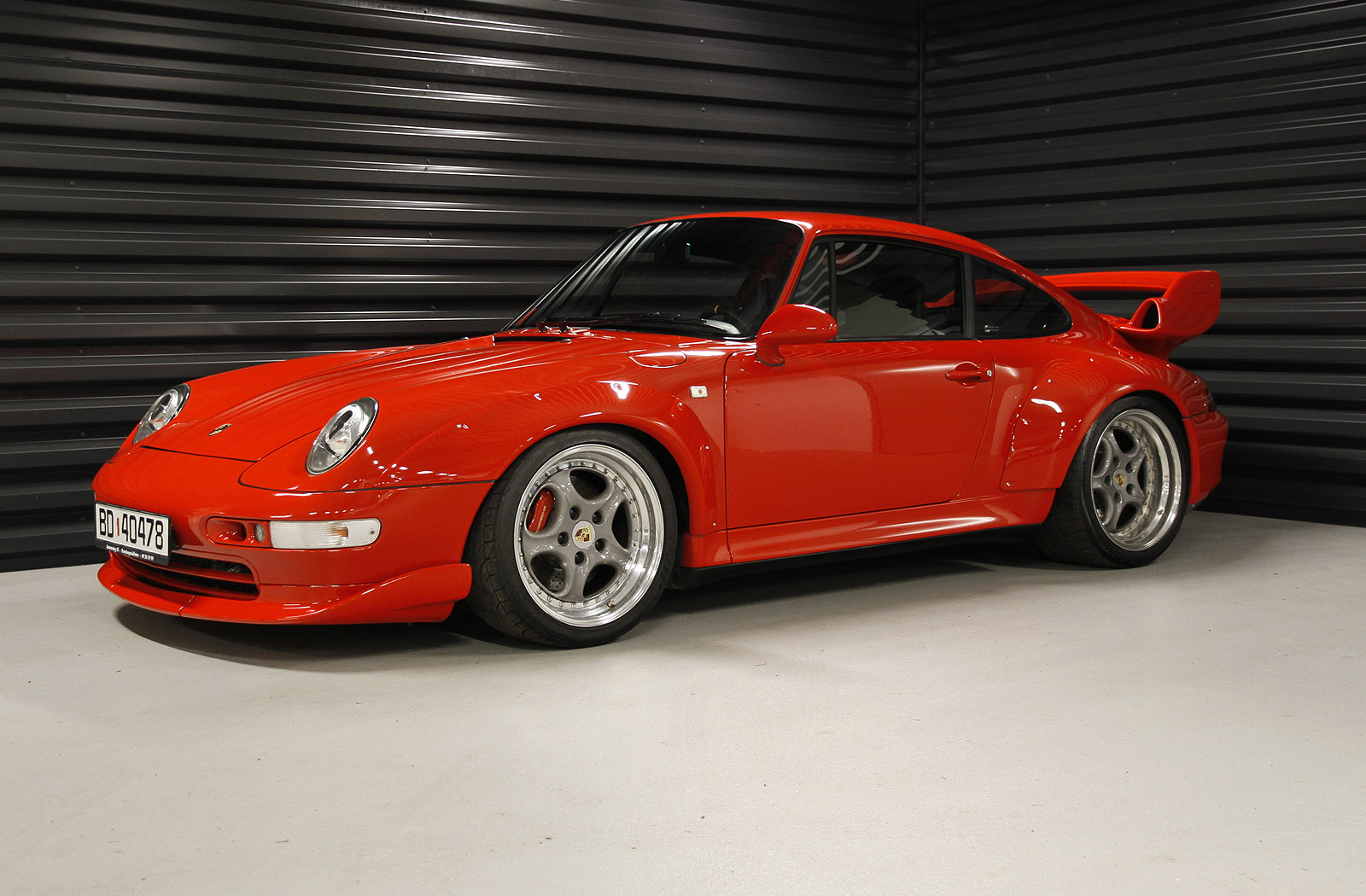
The Porsche 993 GT2 has a front spoiler and riveted wider fenders

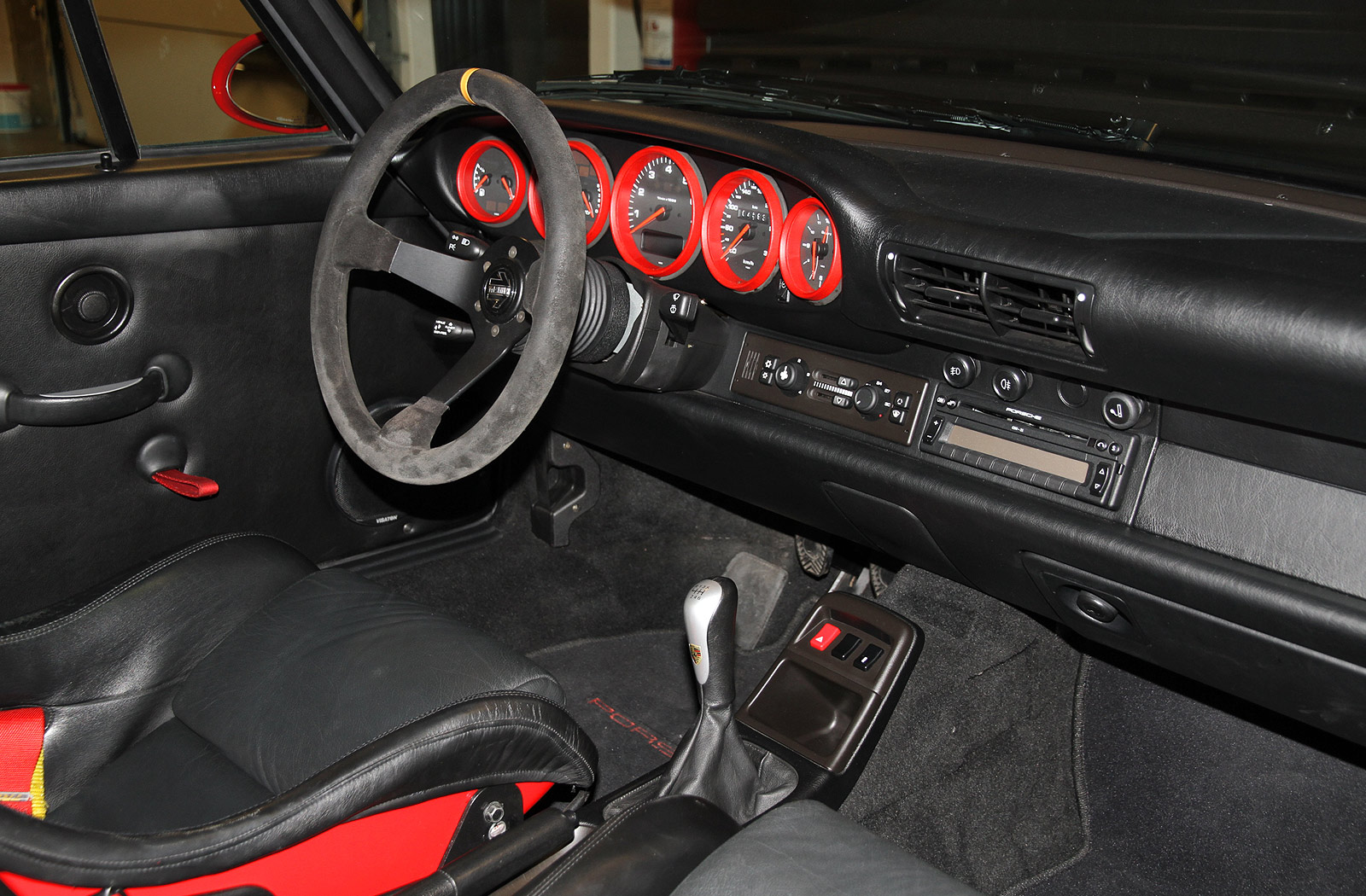
The interior of the Porsche 993 GT2 reflected its racing character

The GT2 was the racing version of the 993 Turbo made to compete in the FIA GT2 class racing. By the mid-1990s, most of the sanctioning bodies of road racing had placed severe limitations, if not outright bans on the use all-wheel drive systems, due in part to Audi's earlier success in campaigning their various Quattro cars in touring car races around the globe, to Porsche's 959 and its racing version the 961. In this atmosphere, to take their turbo-engined 993 racing, Porsche developed the rear-wheel drive GT. The deletion of the all-wheel drive also brought with it the benefit of significant weight savings to the competition car. To qualify the car for racing, a few street-legal variants were created for homologation purposes, which are now highly prized and valued by collectors. The interior treatment of the GT2 is similar to that of the sibling Carrera RS. The fenders of the Turbo have been cut back and replaced with bolt-on plastic pieces to accommodate large racing tyres and to help ease the repairs of damage to the fenders that are an often recurring event in auto racing.

Until 1997, the street-legal GT2 racecar, dubbed the "GT", had almost the same engine as the Turbo, but operated with higher boost pressure and generated a maximum power output of 430 PS (316 kW; 424 hp). In 1998, a dual ignition system was added; power was raised to 450 PS (331 kW; 444 hp) at 6,000 rpm and 586 N⋅m (432 lb⋅ft) of torque at 3,500 rpm. Only 57 road-legal variants were built.

The racing variants have different engine set-ups depending on the applicable racing series. By 1996, the factory-quoted power rating was 456 PS (335 kW; 450 hp) at 5,700 rpm and torque of 670 N⋅m (494 lb⋅ft) of torque at 5,000 rpm. Power output was as high as 600 PS (441 kW; 592 hp) in an "Evo" version designed for the GT1-series, of which only 11 cars were built before it was ultimately replaced by the mid-engined 911 GT1.

Additionally, the rear deck lid of the street-legal version of the GT2 also sported "911 GT" instead of "911 GT2".

=== Speedster ===
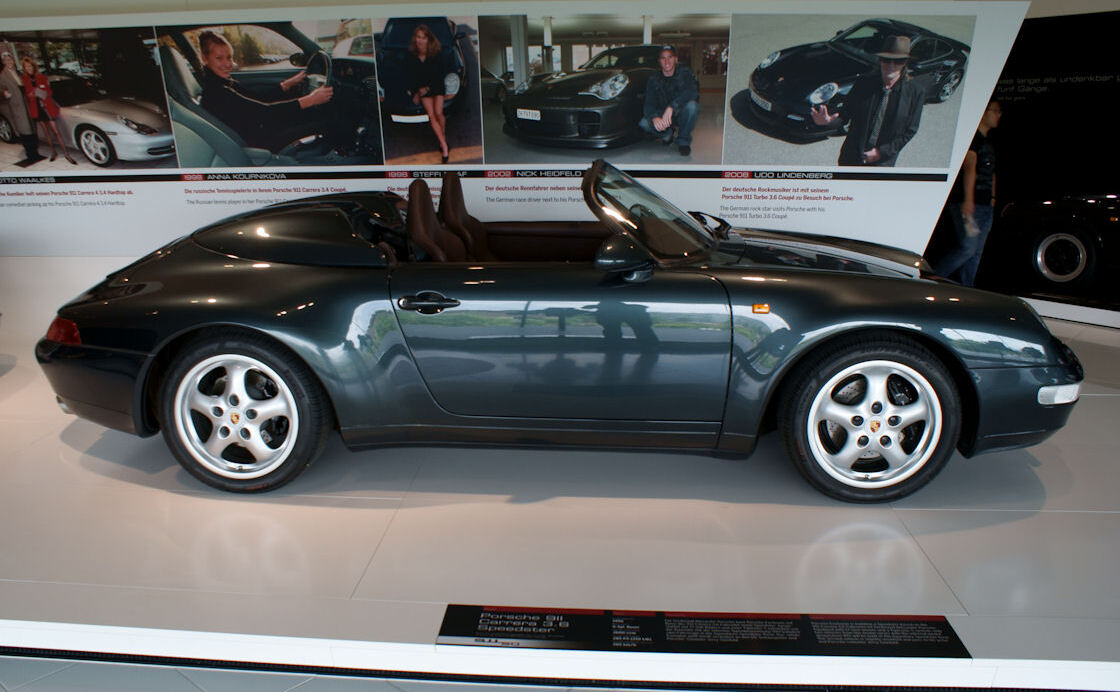
993 Speedster at the Porsche Museum

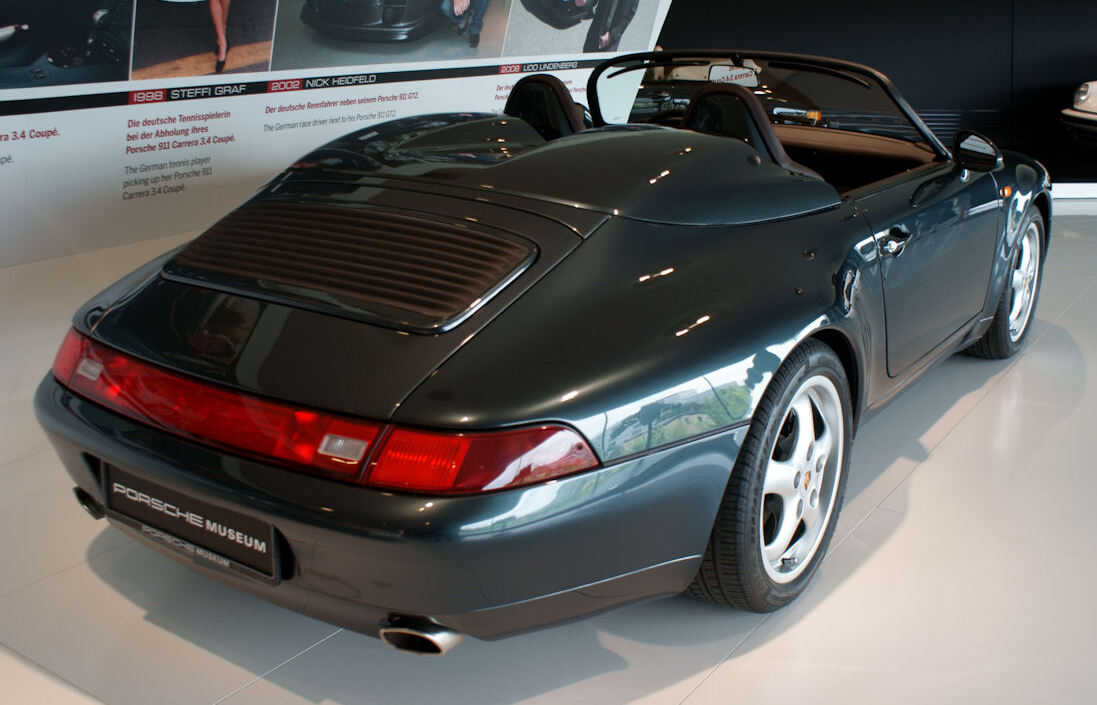

The Speedster model was a variant of the 993, with a lowered roof, and a redesigned interior.

In contrast to the G-model and the 964, Porsche never officially offered the 993 in a Speedster body style. However, two were built by the factory - a dark green Speedster equipped with Tiptronic S and 17-inch (432 mm) wheels for Ferdinand Alexander Porsche (for his 60th anniversary) in 1995 and another wide-body, silver Speedster with manual transmission and 18 in (457 mm) wheels for American TV star Jerry Seinfeld in 1998. The Seinfeld speedster was originally delivered as a cabriolet model and later sent back to the factory Exclusiv department to be "rebuilt" as a speedster. Additionally, a few 993 convertibles were converted to the Speedster body style by aftermarket coach builders.

=== Turbo Cabriolet ===
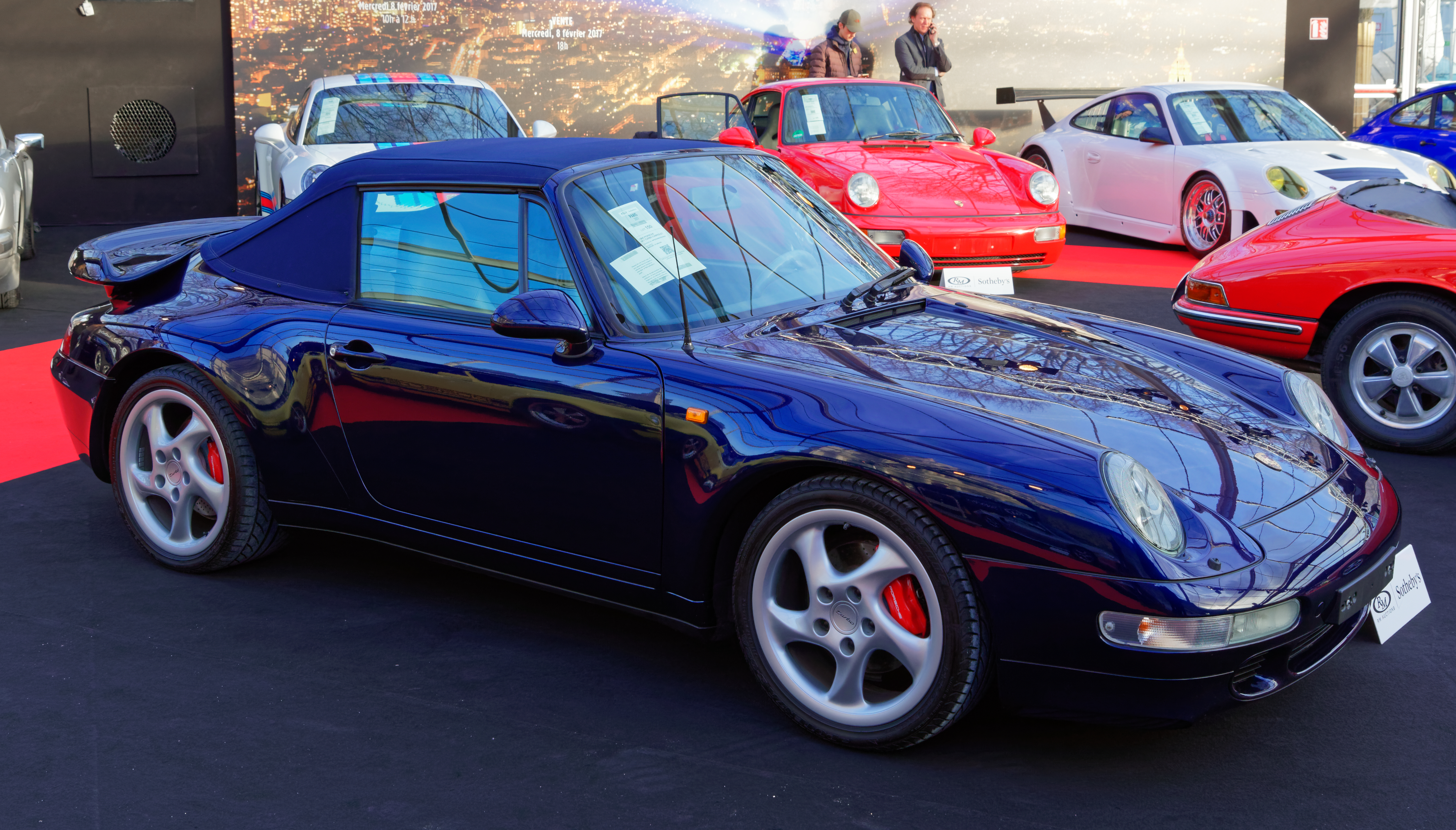

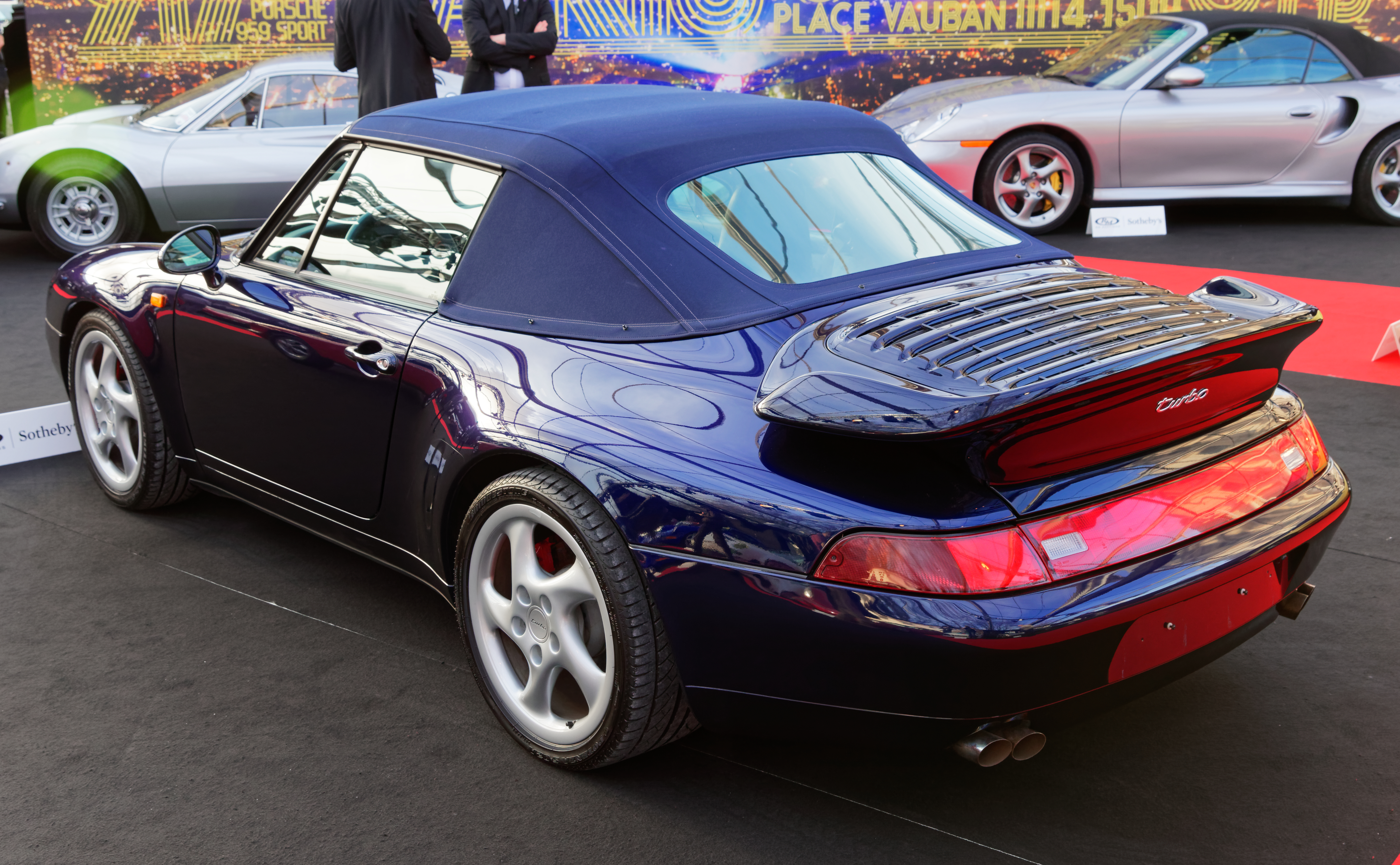
Porsche 993 Turbo Cabriolet

After the 3.3-litre G-model Turbo convertible (1987–89), Porsche never officially offered an air-cooled Turbo convertible again. However, fourteen 993 Turbo Cabriolets were built by the Porsche Exclusiv department in 1995, prior to the introduction of the 993 Turbo coupé. They featured the 360 PS (265 kW; 355 hp) single-turbo engine of the 964 Turbo 3.6, a five-speed manual transmission, rear-wheel drive and the rear wing of the 964 Turbo 3.6. This cost a premium of DM 89,500 (or an additional 62 percent) over the standard 993 Cabriolet's price.

== Performance ==
Performance data: Porsche 993
Model (with model year and source)	0–97 km/h (60 mph)	0–100 km/h (62 mph)	0–160 km/h (100 mph)	0–200 km/h (124 mph)	1/4 mile	1 km	Top speed
Carrera (1994) (Manufacturer)	-	5.6 s	-	-	-	-	270 km/h (168 mph)
Carrera (1994) (Auto Motor Sport 1993)	-	5.3 s	12.4 s	21.1 s	-	24.7 s	267 km/h (166 mph)
Carrera Tiptronic (1994) (Manufacturer)	-	6.6 s	-	-	-	-	265 km/h (165 mph)
Carrera RS 3.8 (1995) (Sport Auto 11/94)	-	5.2 s	11.4 s	18.7 s	-	-	287 km/h (178 mph)
Carrera (US) (1995) (Road&Track Jan/94)	5.2 s	-	13.3 s	-	13.8 at 102 mph (164.2 km/h)	-	est 270 km/h (170 mph)
Carrera (US) (1995) (Car&Driver Jun/94)	4.7 s	-	12.1 s	-	13.4 at 104 mph (167.4 km/h)	-	261 km/h (162 mph)
Carrera 4 (US) (1995) (Road & Track Jan/95)	5.7 s	-	14.0 s	-	14.1 at 100.5 mph (161.7 km/h)	-	est 270 km/h (170 mph)
Carrera (1996/1997) (Repair Manual)	-	5.6 s	12.3 s	-	-	25,1 s	270 km/h (168 mph)
Carrera Tiptronic (1996/1997) (Manufacturer)	-	6.4 s	13.8 s	-	-	-	270 km/h (168 mph)
Carrera RS 3.8 (1996) (performance car Mar/96)	4.7 s	-	11.2 s	-	13.2 at 109 mph (175.4 km/h)	-	-
Targa (1996) (Auto Motor Sport 20/95)	5.5	5.5 s	-	21.3 s	-	-	277 km/h (172 mph)
Carrera 4S (1996) (Sport Auto 12/95)	-	5.5 s	13.2 s	23.0 s	-	-	290 km/h (180 mph)
Targa Tiptronic (1996) (Sport Auto Dec/95)	-	7.1 s	15.4 s	27.3 s	-	-	270 km/h (168 mph)
Carrera 4S (US) (1997) (Car and Driver Jun/96)	4.9 s	-	12.8 s	-	13.5 at 102 mph (164.2 km/h)	-	259 km/h (161 mph)
Carrera S (1997) (Sport Auto 02/97)	5.2 s	5.7 s	13.3 s	22.7 s	-	-	270 km/h (168 mph)
Turbocharged versions
Turbo (1995–1998) (Manufacturer)	-	4.5 s	-	-	-	23.0 s	290 km/h (180 mph)
Turbo (1995) (Auto Motor Sport 1995)	-	4.3 s	9.5 s	15.1 s	-	22.4 s	291 km/h (181 mph)
Turbo (1995) (Motor Trend Jun/95)	3.7 s	-	9.1 s	-	12.1 at 113.1 mph (182 km/h)	-	-
Turbo (1995) (Autocar 31 May 95)	3.7 s	-	9.2 s	-	12.3 at 114 mph (183.5 km/h)	22.1 s	290+ km/h (180+ mph)
Turbo (1996) (Road&Track Jul/95)	3.9 s	-	9.9 s	-	12.5 at 112.5 mph (181.1 km/h)	-	est 290 km/h (180 mph)
Turbo (1995) (Car and Driver Jul/95)	3.7 s	-	9.4 s	-	12.3 at 114 mph (183.5 km/h)	-	283 km/h (176 mph)
Turbo S (1997) (Car and Driver Jul/97)	3.7 s	-	8.8 s	-	12.2 at 114 mph (183.5 km/h)	-	303 km/h (188 mph)
Turbo S (with performance package) (Performance Car May/98)	3.7 s	-	8.56 s	-	12.1 at 118 mph (190 km/h)	-	est 301 km/h (187 mph)
Turbo (1996) (with factory upgrades) (Auto Motor Sport 25/1996)	-	3.8 s	8.5 s	13.5 s	-	21.8 s	300 km/h (186 mph)
GT2 (1995) (Auto Motor Sport 1995)	-	3.9 s	8.4 s	13.3 s	-	21.7 s	296 km/h (184 mph)

== Production figures ==
Model	Total	Subseries total	Grand total
993 Carrera (272 PS)	14,541	46,923	68,029
993 Carrera Cabriolet (272 PS)	7,730	46,923	68,029
993 Carrera (285 PS)	8,586	46,923	68,029
993 Carrera Cabriolet (285 PS)	7,769	46,923	68,029
993 Targa (285 PS)	4,583	46,923	68,029
993 Carrera S (285 PS)	3,714	46,923	68,029
993 Carrera 4 (272 PS)	2,884	14,114	68,029
993 Carrera 4 Cabriolet (272 PS)	1,284	14,114	68,029
993 Carrera 4 (285 PS)	1,860	14,114	68,029
993 Carrera 4 Cabriolet (285 PS)	1,138	14,114	68,029
993 Carrera 4S (285 PS)	6,948	14,114	68,029
993 Turbo 3.6	5,978	5,978	68,029
993 Carrera RS	1,014	1,014	68,029

== Media ==
The 993 generation of the 911 is often referred to as the best and most desirable of the 911 series. The 993 is quoted as "the last complete 'modern classic'"; "the 993 was and forever will be that last fresh breath of air that Porsche gave the world; elegance and muscle all in one package." The book "Porsche 993 - Essential Companion" refers to the 993 as the "King of Porsche," and it is generally acknowledged as "The purists' Holy Grail."

In its 12 April 2017 article entitled "The Porsche 993 Actually Lives up to the Hype," Road & Track writes that the 993 is "something truly special," with "a combination of old-school feel and modern usability that isn't found in many other cars," with "great steering, great brakes, and a wonderfully composed package." It also states that "The 993 is also beautifully built -- it's a relic from the time when Porsche didn't cut corners anywhere."

== Successor ==
The 993 was replaced by the 996. This represented a dramatic change for the 911. As many enthusiasts agree, "the 993 is one of the sweetest spots in the 911's half-century of existence," and while "more modern versions might be more dynamically capable, they're bloated behemoths in comparison to the lean 993."
