= Porsche 911 GT3 =

Porsche sports car

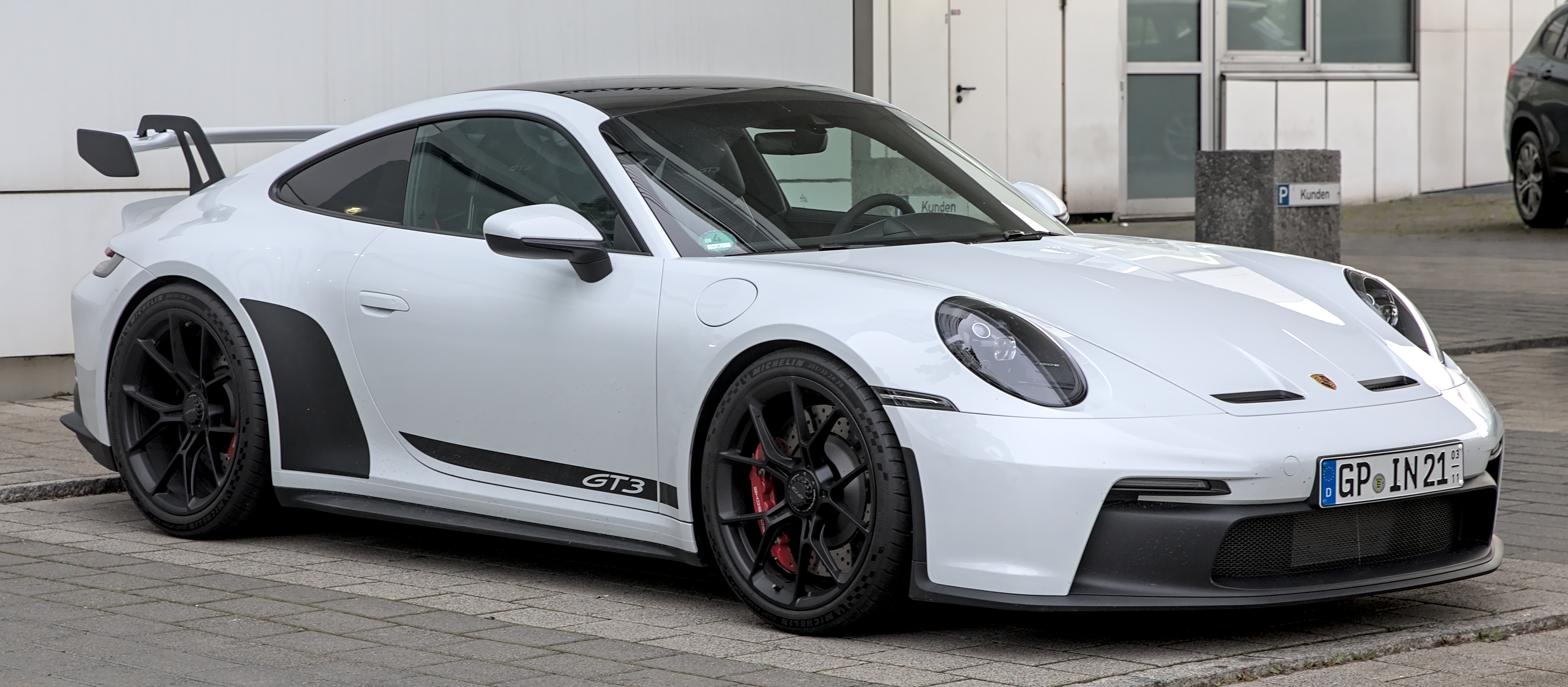
- Porsche 911 GT3 (992)

Overview
- Manufacturer: Porsche
- Production: 1999–present
- Assembly: Germany: Zuffenhausen (Zuffenhausen Porsche); Flacht, Weissach (Motorsport Centre Flacht)

Body and chassis
- Class: Sports car (S)
- Body style: 2-door coupé 2-door cabriolet (GT3 S/C, 2026–present)
- Layout: Rear-engine, rear-wheel-drive
- Related: Porsche 911 GT2

Chronology
- Predecessor: Porsche 911 Carrera RS (993)

The Porsche 911 GT3 is a high-performance homologation model of the Porsche 911 sports car. It is a range of high-performance models, which began with the 1973 911 Carrera RS. The GT3 has had a successful racing career in the one-make national and regional Porsche Carrera Cup and GT3 Cup Challenge series, as well as the international Porsche Supercup supporting the FIA Formula One World Championship.

== Road cars ==
=== 996 GT3 ===
996 GT3
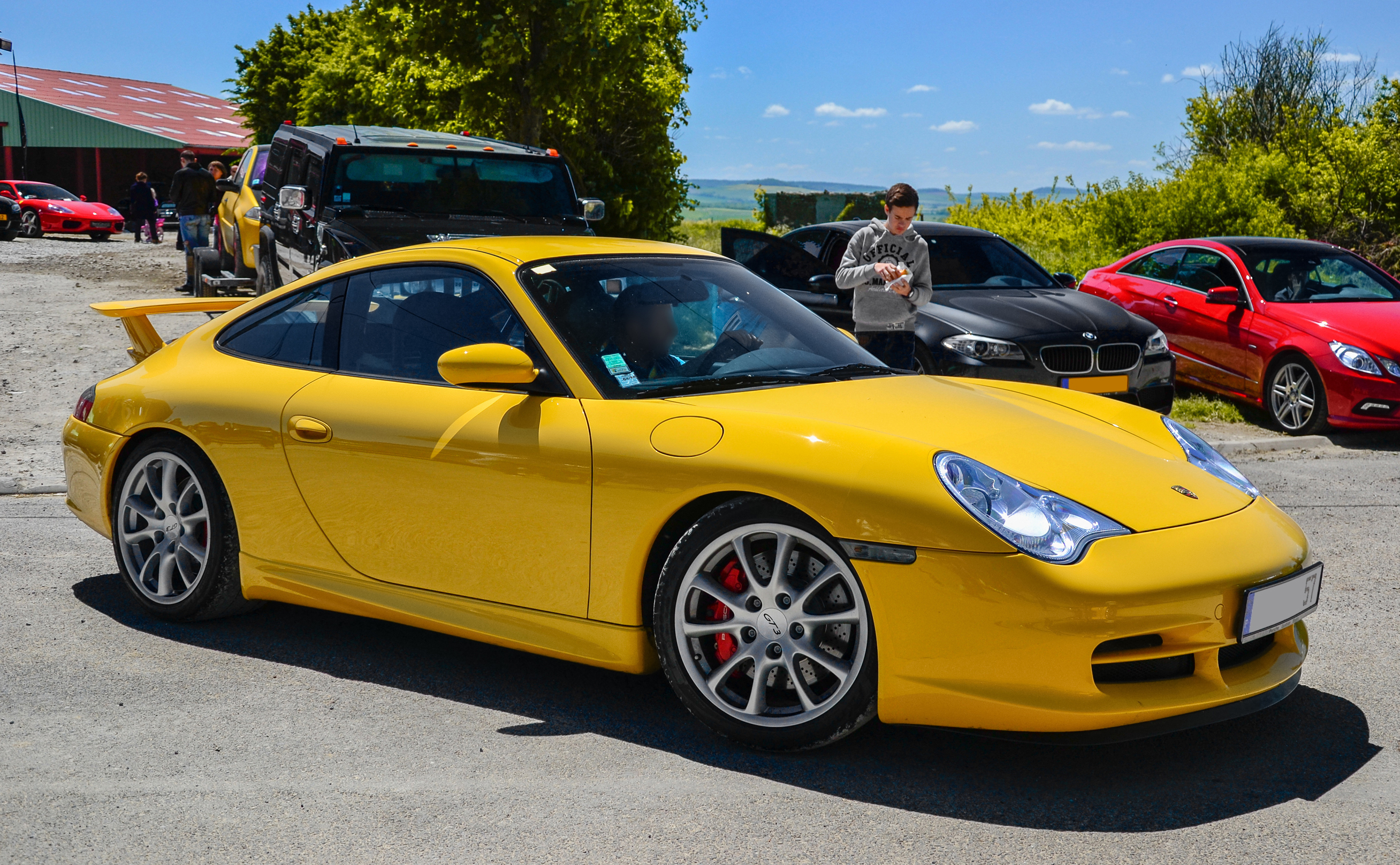

Overview
- Production: 1999–2005: (1,868 produced)

Powertrain
- Engine: 3.6L (3,596cc) Porsche M96.79 N/A Flat-6
- Power output: 265–279 kW; 355–375 hp (360–380 PS)
- Transmission: 6-speed manual

Dimensions
- Length: 4,435 mm (174.6 in)
- Width: 1,770 mm (69.7 in)
- Height: 1,275 mm (50.2 in)
- Curb weight: 1,380 kg (3,043 lb)

The "GT3" nameplate was introduced in 1999 as part of the first generation of the Porsche 996 model range (commonly known as 996.1) as a homologation model for the cars entered in the GT class, predating the Group GT3 which was introduced in 2005. As with Porsche's previous 911 RS models, the 996 GT3 was focused on racing, and so was devoid of items that added unnecessary weight to the car. Sound deadening was almost completely removed, as were the rear seats, rear loud speakers, sunroof, and air conditioning, although automatic air conditioning and CD/radio became no-cost optional add-ons.

The engine of the 996 GT3 sets it apart from 996 Carrera models, as it shared nothing with the standard so-called "integrated dry sump" (e.g. wet-sump) flat-six engine used in the water-cooled 996 Carrera engine introduced in MY1999. The 996 GT3 engine is naturally aspirated and based on the "Mezger" racing engine used in the 962 and 911 GT1 race cars. That engine was known as the "Mezger" engine after its designer, Hans Mezger. The engine uses the original air-cooled 911's versatile dry-sump crankcase with an external oil reservoir. The 996 GT3 has 265 kW; 355 hp (360 PS), compared to the 221 kW; 296 hp (300 PS) of the standard 996. In GT3 configuration, the so-called "split" crankcase (meaning the parting line of crankcase is on the crankshaft centreline) uses, instead of a fan and finned cylinders, separate water jackets added onto each side of the crankcase to cool banks of three cylinders with water pumped through a radiator. Thus, the GT3 engine is very similar to the completely water-cooled 962 racing car's engine, which is based on the same crankcase. The 962 differs, however, by using six individual cylinder heads while the "Mezger" uses two cylinder heads, each covering a bank of three cylinders. The GT3 engine could thus also be thought of as similar to a 959 engine, but with water-cooled crankcase. Up until model year 2004 996 production, the basic casting used for the "Mezger" crankcase of the GT3 was the same as the 996 GT1 LeMans cars, and the same "964.." block part-number is visible on the bottom of the crankcase. Beginning with MY2004 however, production was outsourced to Valmet facilities in Spain, France, and Austria, and all subsequent road-legal Mezger engines are part-numbered "996.." (even on later 997 cars).

Because the GT1 Mezger block uses the same legacy Porsche 356 engine to transmission mounting flange configuration, the 996 GT3 used a 6-speed manual gearbox also of air-cooled 911 heritage. This new G96/50 gearbox has interchangeable gear ratios and is more durable making it more suitable for racing than the standard type 996 Carrera's gearbox.

To bring the vehicle's track-prowess to the maximum level, Porsche endowed the GT3 with enlarged brakes, a lowered, re-tuned suspension system, lighter-weight wheels and a new front bumper with matched rear spoiler to help increase downforce, thereby increasing grip.

Porsche offered a no-cost option for the GT3 called the 'Clubsport' package. This option replaced the standard electrically adjustable leather front seats with manually adjustable racing bucket seats finished in fire-retardant fabric, single mass flywheel, bolt-in half-roll cage, 6-point drivers racing harness (also replacing the standard side airbags), fire extinguisher (mounted in the front passenger footwell) and preparation for a battery master switch. The Clubsport option was never offered to US customers, ostensibly due to the additional DOT crash testing that would have been required to allow US sales.

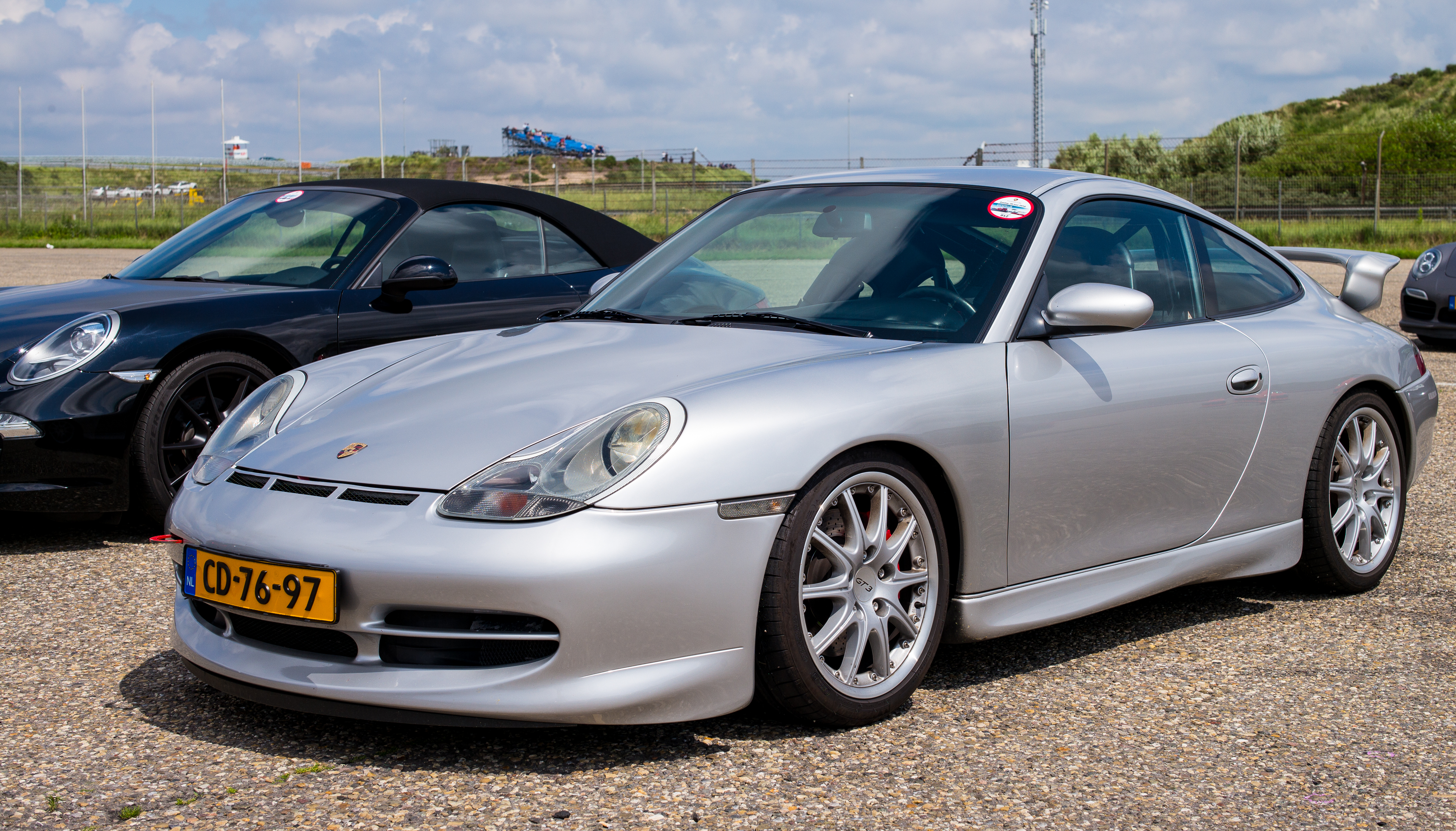
Porsche 996 GT3 (pre-facelift) front

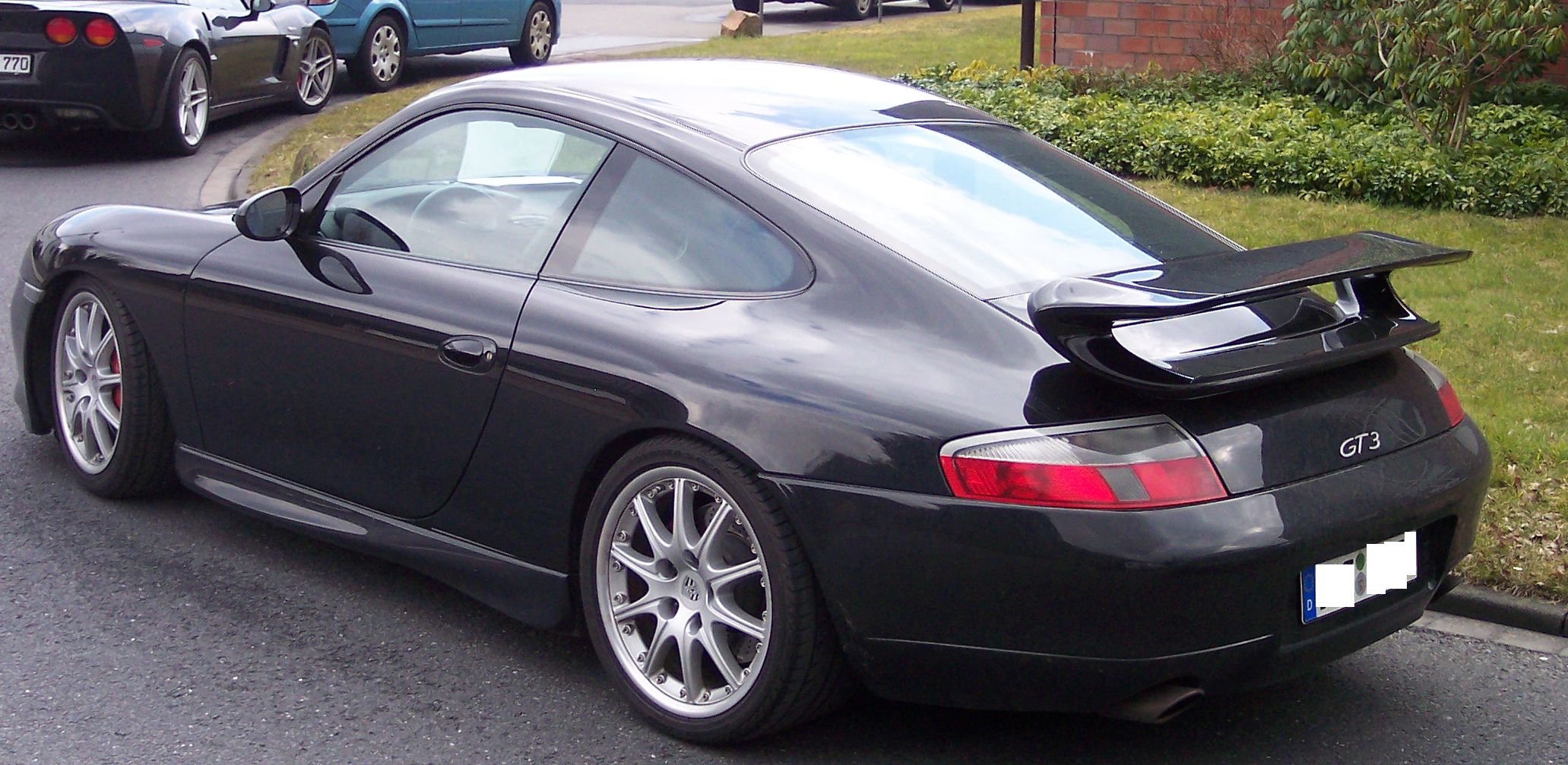
Porsche 996 GT3 (pre-facelift) rear

==== 996.2 GT3 ====
Porsche made significant updates to the GT3 for 2004 model year, using the 2002 996 facelift including headlights that were differentiated from the entry-level Boxster. This model is commonly known as the 996.2 GT3. Engine power output rating was raised to 280 kW (381 PS) and torque to 385 N⋅m (284 lb⋅ft), 80% of which was available from 2,000 rpm. The braking setup was upgraded, now featuring 6-piston calipers on the front (rears remained 4-piston), and the Porsche Ceramic Composite Brake system was offered as an option. The GT3 now used the body shell of the Carrera 4.

In track testing by American automotive journals, the GT3 managed a 0–97 km/h (0–60 mph) acceleration time of 4.5 seconds and a quarter mile time of 12.0 seconds at 190 km/h (118 mph). During skidpad testing, the GT3 posted 1.03g.

Porsche's official test-driver Walter Röhrl completed the Nürburgring Nordschleife with the 996 GT3 in 7 minutes 56 seconds, a feat which was used by Porsche to promote the car.

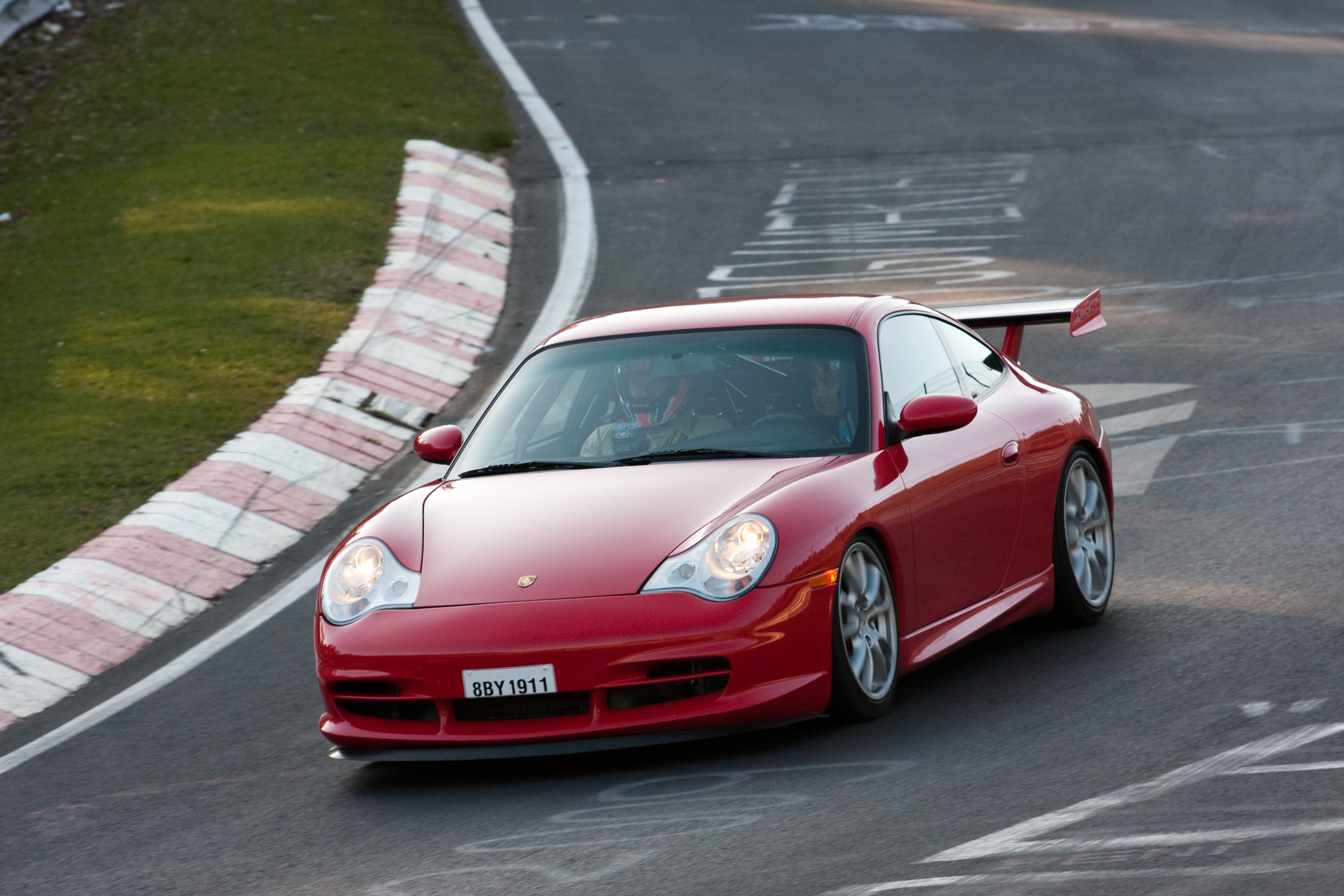
Porsche 996 GT3 (post-facelift) front

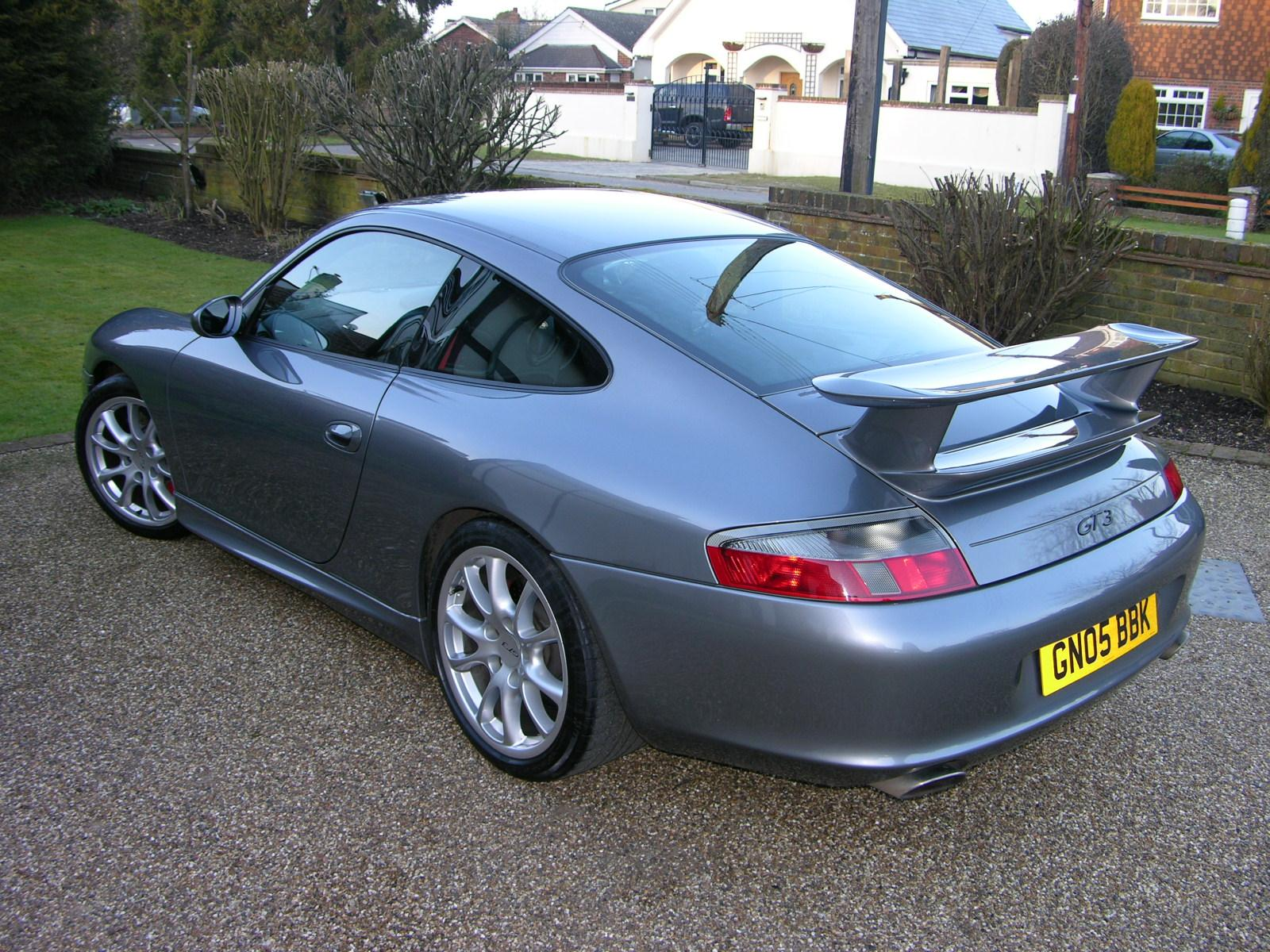
Porsche 996 GT3 (post-facelift) rear

==== 996.2 GT3 RS ====
In 2003, Porsche introduced the Porsche 911 GT3 RS, an even more track-focused version of the 996 GT3. RS is short for the German RennSport, translating to "racing sport" in English. The "RS" moniker, and the characteristic lightweight blue or red wheels and "GT3 RS" side stickers link the 996 GT3 RS to historically important Porsches such as the Carrera 2.7 RS of the early 1970s. The 996 GT3 RS is lighter than the 996 GT3 thanks to a polycarbonate rear window, and a carbon fibre hood & rear wing. Porsche Ceramic Composite Brake (PCCB) Carbon fibre-reinforced Silicon Carbide (C/SiC) ceramic composite brakes, which are also more heat and fade resistant than the cast iron units fitted as standard, were optional.

The 996 GT3 RS has a slightly different engine specification to the 996 GT3. The cylinder heads of the 996 GT3 RS have reshaped intake and exhaust ports for race homologation. Porsche claim the same 284 kW (381 hp) power output as the standard GT3, but Porsche's control dyno showed a jump to nearly 298 kW (400 hp). The RS also has progressive springs rather than linear. The dampers are uprated and are between 10 and 15 percent stiffer than the 996 GT3 in bounce and rebound.

The wheel carriers are totally redesigned to maximize the improved dynamic camber control. The suspension top mounts can be turned 120 degrees to a cup car position. Both front and rear control arms are adjustable. The RS is 3 mm (0.1 in) lower than the 996 GT3.

The rear wing delivers 35 kg (77 lb) of downforce at 200 km/h (120 mph). The RS has ram air ducts on the engine bay which force air into the intake with 18 mb (18 hPa) of pressure at 300 km/h (190 mph), and this is enough to create an excess power output of 11 kW; 15 PS (15 hp). This additional power output cannot be homologated since the official engine output figures are certified on a dynamometer.

The 996 GT3 RS had a production run from 2003 to 2005. Only 140 right hand drive cars were built by Porsche and 113 of those were officially imported into the UK. The 996 GT3 RS was not sold in the United States or Canada.

Automobile magazines claim the 996 GT3 RS can accelerate from 0–97 km/h (0–60 mph) in about 4.3 seconds, maintains over 1.0g on the skidpad, and has a top speed of around 306 km/h (190 mph).

The RS completed a lap of the Nürburgring 7:43, four seconds faster than the 996 GT2, the top-of-the-line 996 variant of the time.

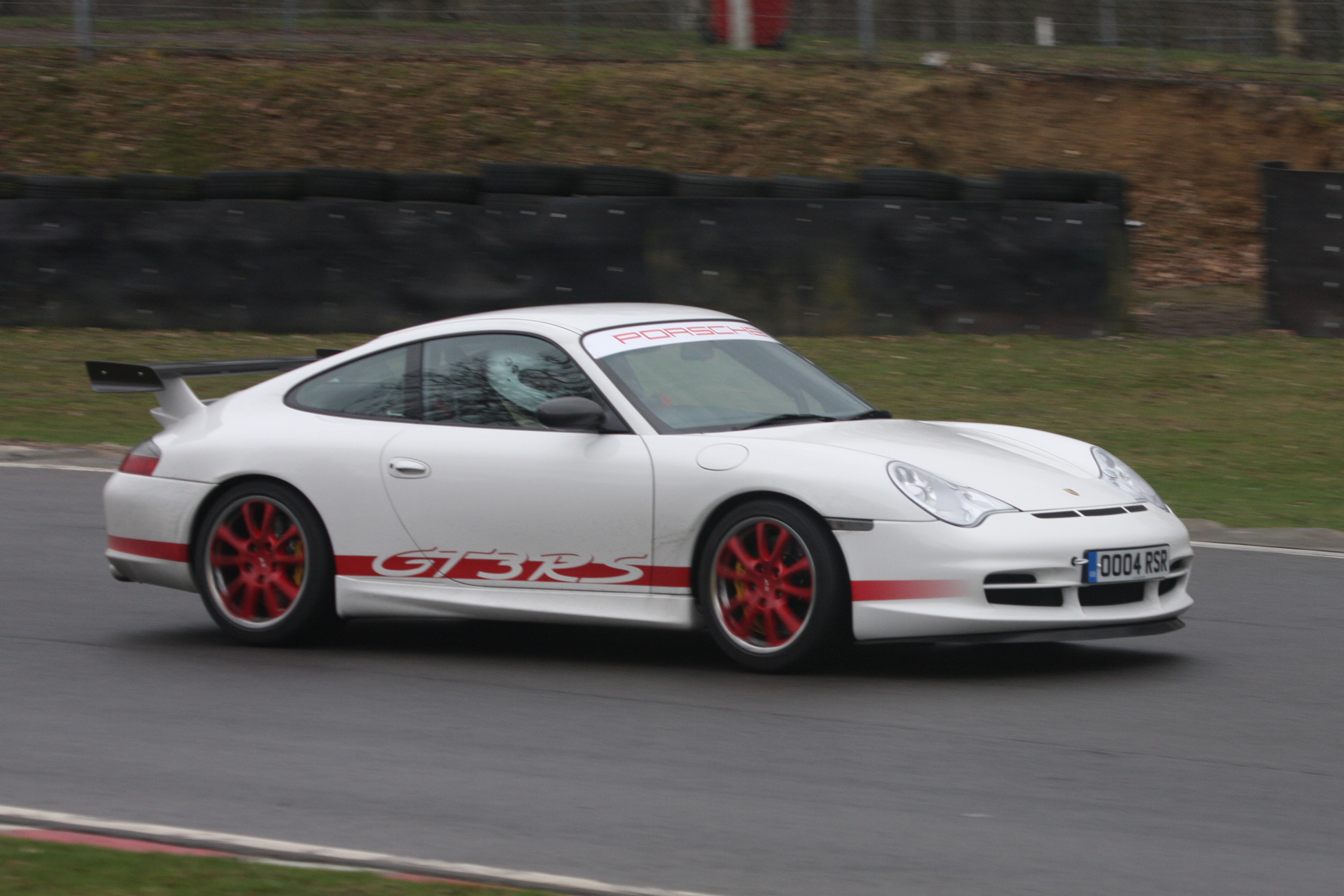
Porsche 911 GT3 RS (996) front

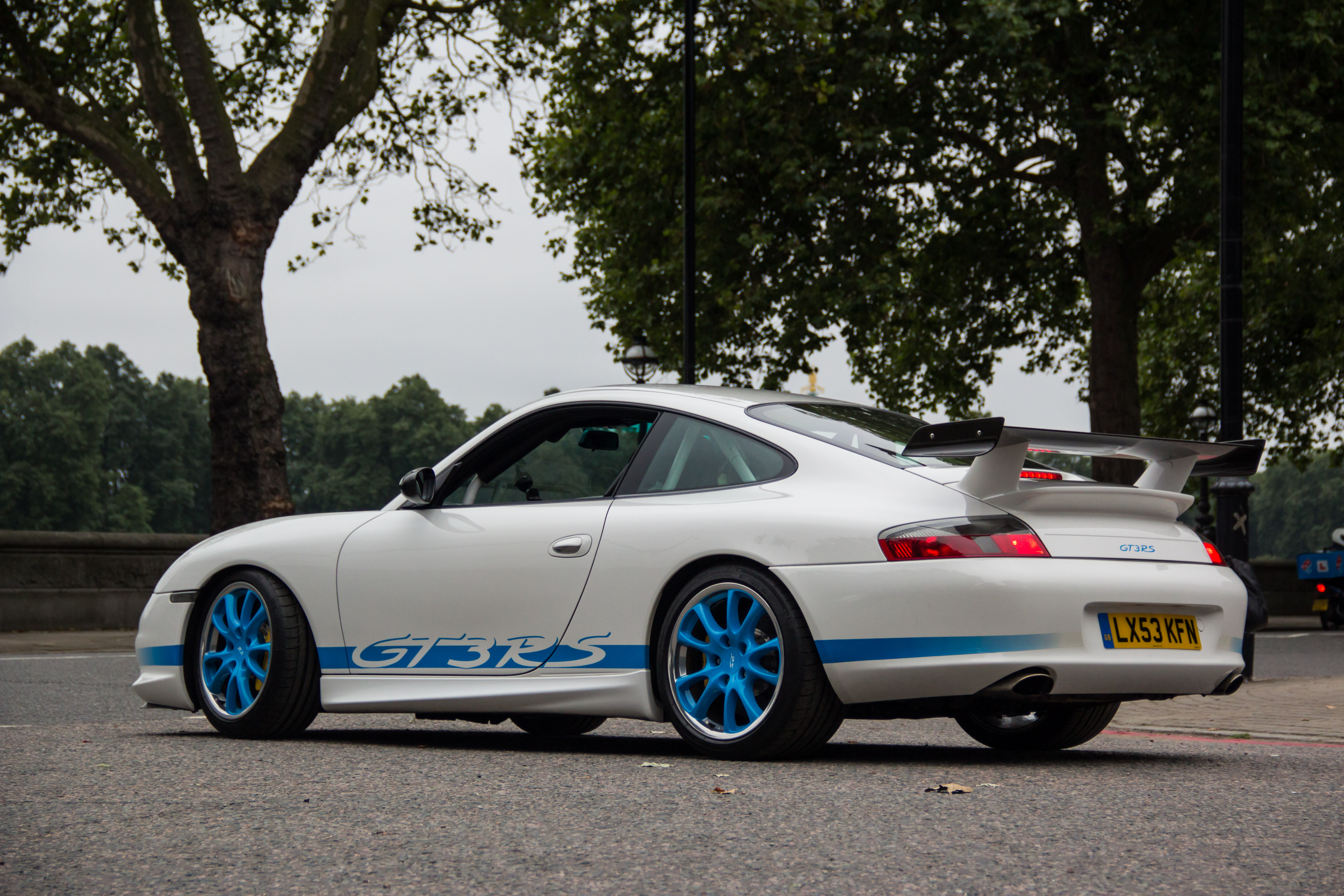
Porsche 911 GT3 RS (996) rear

=== 997 GT3 ===
997 GT3
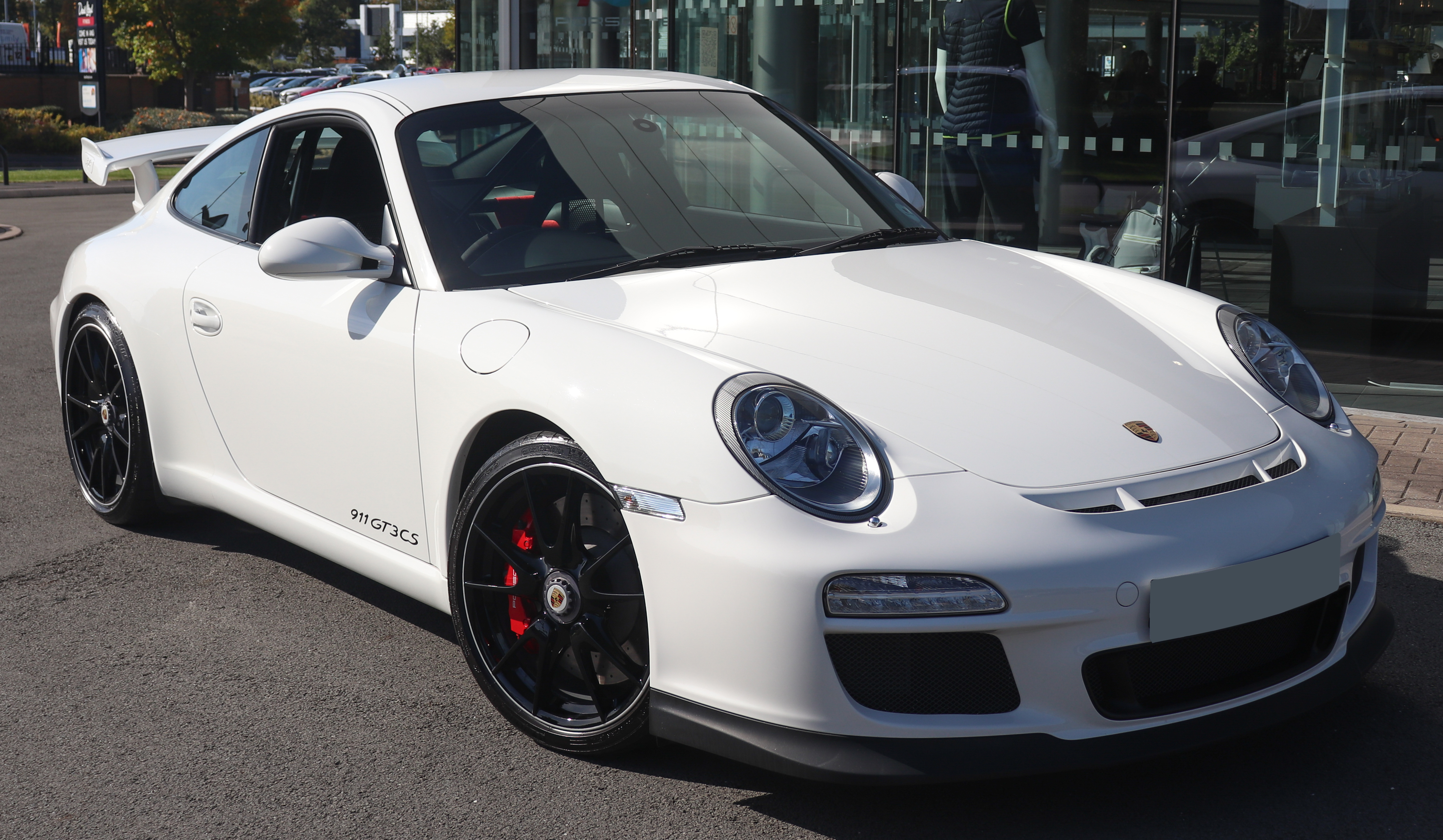

Overview
- Production: 2006–2011

Powertrain
- Engine: 3.6 L (3,596cc) Porsche M97.76 N/A Flat-6 Engine; 3.8 L (3,796cc) Porsche M97.77 N/A Flat-6 Engine; 4.0 L (3,996cc) Porsche M97.74 N/A Flat-6 Engine
- Power output: 305 kW; 409 hp (415 PS) (2006–2009); 320 kW; 429 hp (435 PS) (2009–2011 GT3); 331 kW; 444 hp (450 PS) (2010–2011 GT3 RS); 368 kW; 493 hp (500 PS) (2011 GT3 RS 4.0)
- Transmission: 6-speed manual

Dimensions
- Length: 4,427 mm (174.3 in)
- Width: 1,808 mm (71.2 in)
- Height: 1,280 mm (50.4 in)
- Curb weight: 1,395 kg (3,075 lb)

==== 997.1 GT3 ====
In February 2006, Porsche unveiled the second generation of GT3, the 997 commonly now known as the 997.1 GT3. In addition to a new 305 kW (415 PS) 3.6 litre flat-six engine, the vehicle featured "zero lift" aerodynamics, meaning the car creates only aerodynamic downforce and no grip-diminishing "lift" upwards and away from the road surface. The GT3 made use of a modified, track oriented version of Porsche's active PASM suspension, making it the first of Porsche's RS or GT3 versions to feature an electronically adjustable suspension system. Also available was a navigation system and Porsche's "sports chrono" gauge package. The car went on sale in the summer of 2006.. A total of 917 units were sold in the United States and 46 units in Canada.

The 997 GT3 has a rated 0–97 km/h (0–60 mph) acceleration time of 4.1 seconds and has a top speed of 311 km/h (193 mph). Road and Track was able to achieve a 0–97 km/h (0–60 mph) acceleration time of 3.8 seconds. Porsche's official test-driver Walter Röhrl completed the Nürburgring Nordschleife in 7 minutes 42 seconds with the 997 GT3 in 2006.

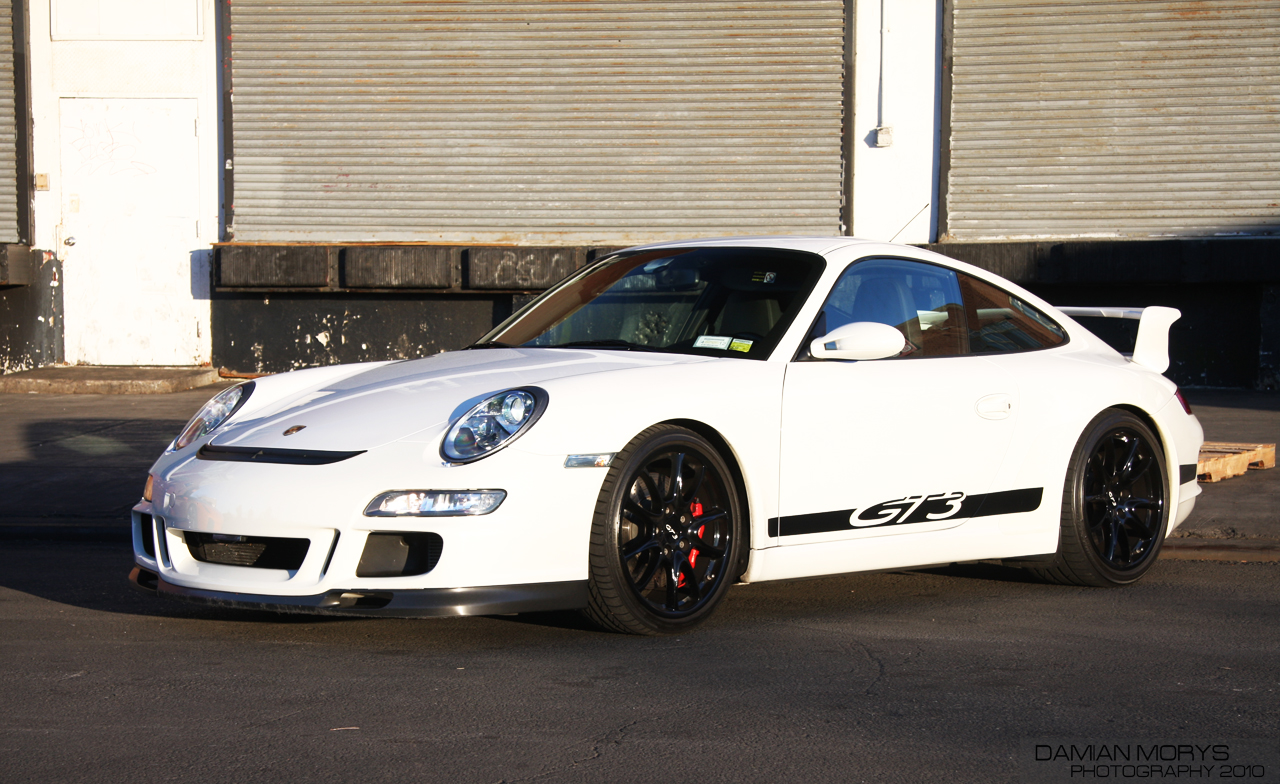
Porsche 997 GT3 (pre-facelift) front

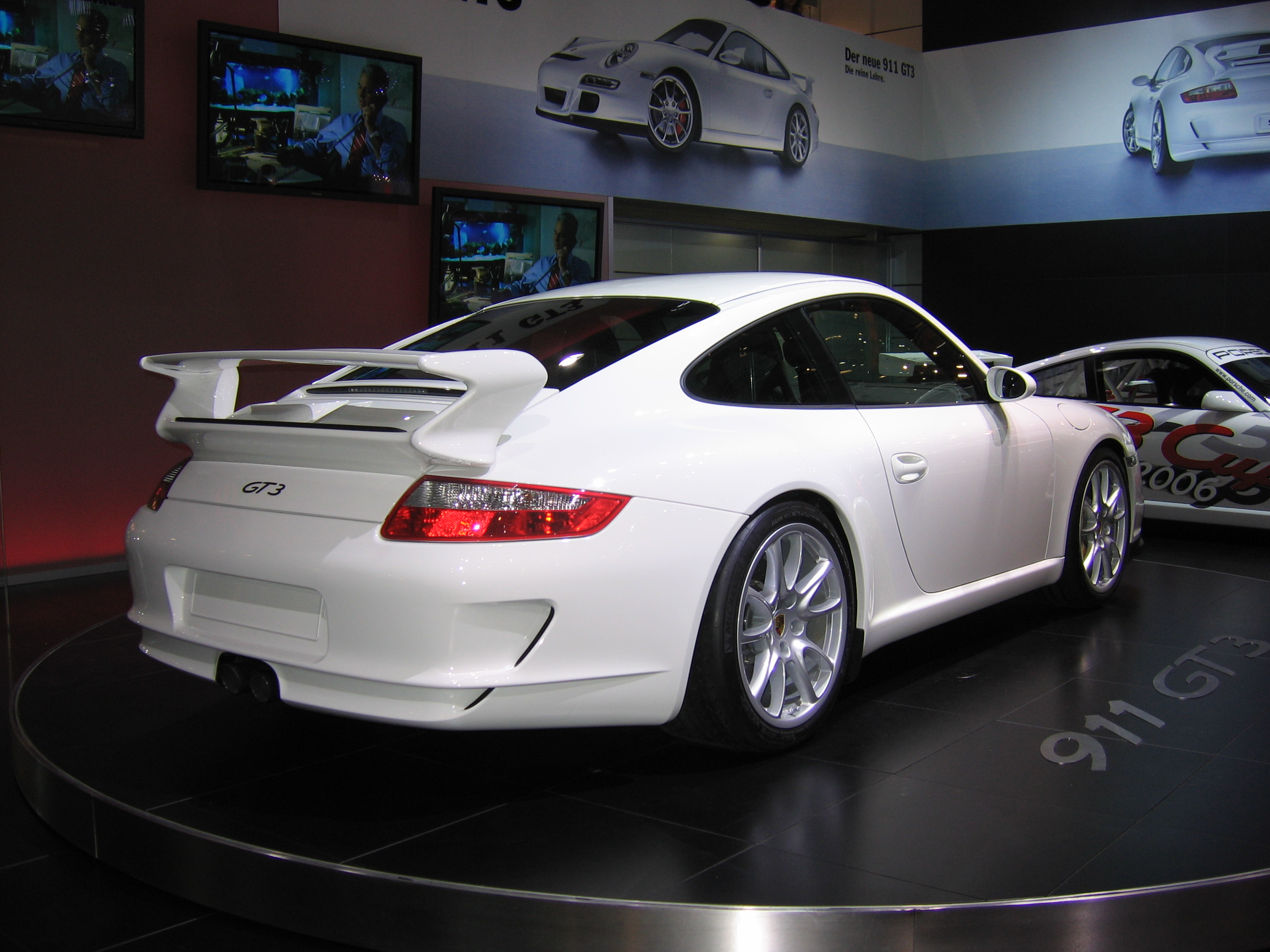
Porsche 997 GT3 (pre-facelift) rear

==== 997.1 GT3 RS ====
Porsche also offered an RS version of the 997 GT3. In common with its predecessors, it was a homologation model for use in a range of racing series. The 997 GT3 RS was introduced in Europe in October 2006 and in North America in spring 2007.

The 997 GT3 RS is 20 kg (44 lb) lighter than the 997 GT3, weighing in at 1,370 kg (3,020 lb). This weight-saving was achieved by the use of an adjustable carbon fibre wing, a steel engine cover, and a lightweight plastic windscreen. The weight savings gives the 997 GT3 RS corresponding engine power to curb weight ratio of 224 kW (300 hp) per tonne.

The body of the 997 GT3 RS is 64 mm (2.5 in) wider at the rear than the 997 GT3 (a legacy from the Carrera 4 models with which it shares its body shell). The muscular-looking rear end conceals a wider track that not only improves directional stability but also increases the potential cornering grip. However, drag is increased and top speed is reduced due to the larger rear wing. In addition to the new technology, the paint scheme and body panels are all designed specifically for the RS.

The US version of the 997 GT3 RS has a standard rear window (not plexiglas) and the smaller 911 fuel tank to comply with rules of SCCA, Can-Am, and IMSA. For Grand-Am races, the central locking wheel nut is replaced with the standard five-lug pattern required under Grand-Am rules.

Production of the first generation 997 GT3 RS (997.1 GT3 RS) ended in 2009. An estimated 1,168 vehicles were delivered worldwide, with a total of 410 units sold in the United States and 42 units in Canada.

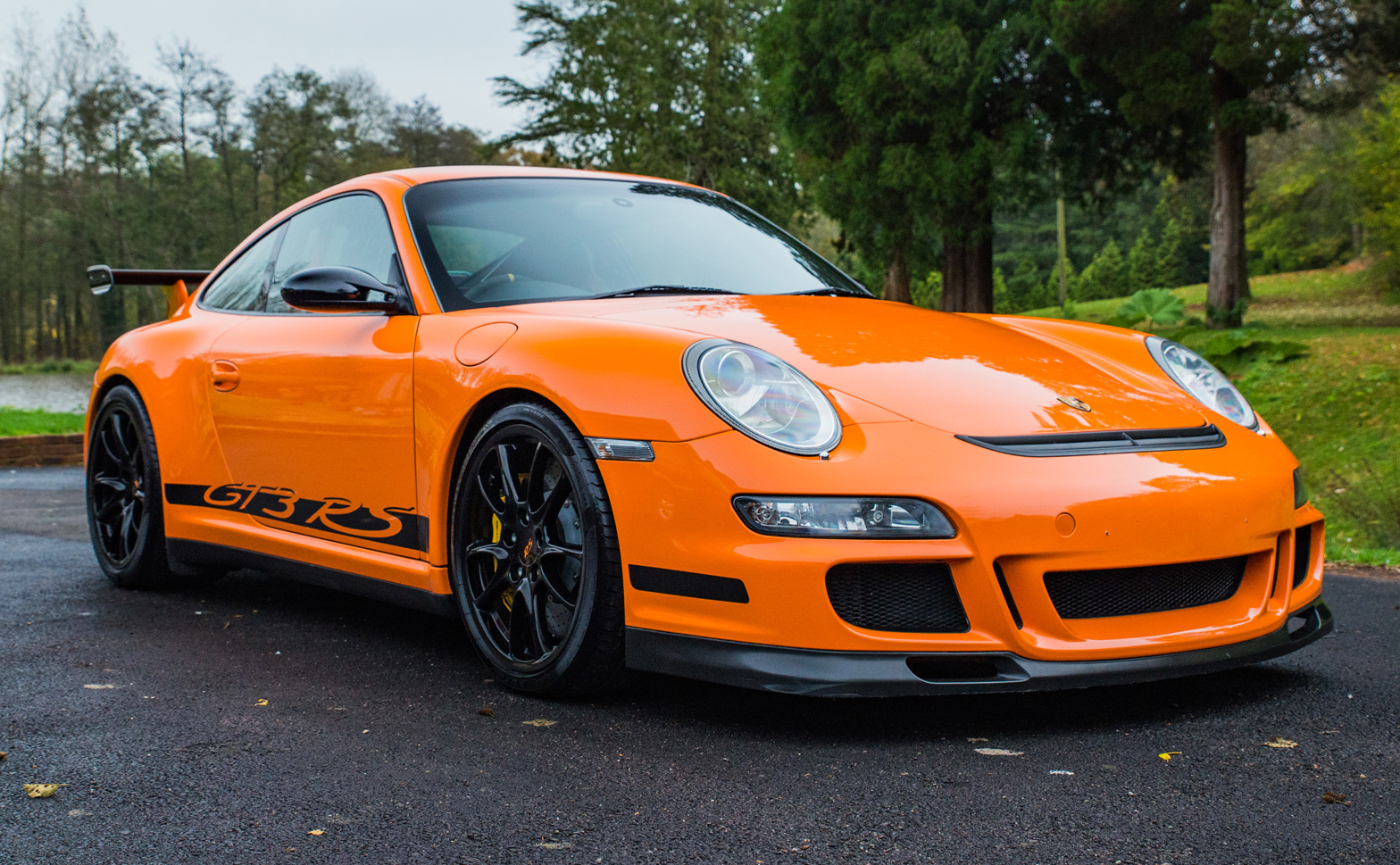
Porsche 997 GT3 RS (pre-facelift) front

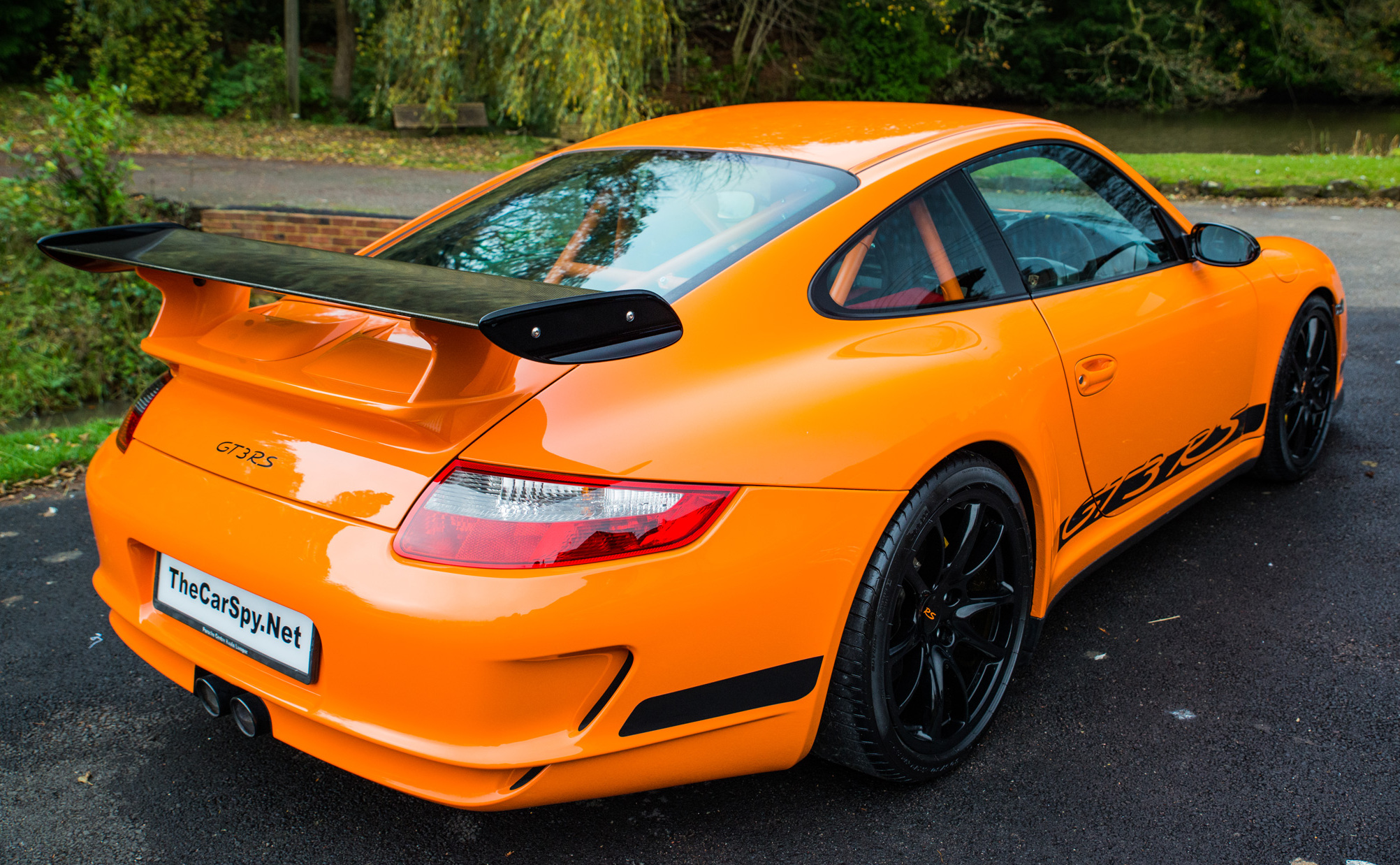
Porsche 997 GT3 RS (pre-facelift) rear

==== 997.2 GT3 ====
In 2009, Porsche launched the 2nd Generation 997 GT3 (commonly known as the 997.2 GT3), with an enlarged 3.8 litre engine rated at 320 kW (435 PS). It also featured a number of new options including dynamic engine mounts and a pneumatically lifting front axle to compensate for the low ground clearance. The rear spoiler was also modified along with other parts of the bodywork. Deliveries in Europe commenced in November the same year. A total of 654 units were sold in the United States and 58 units in Canada.

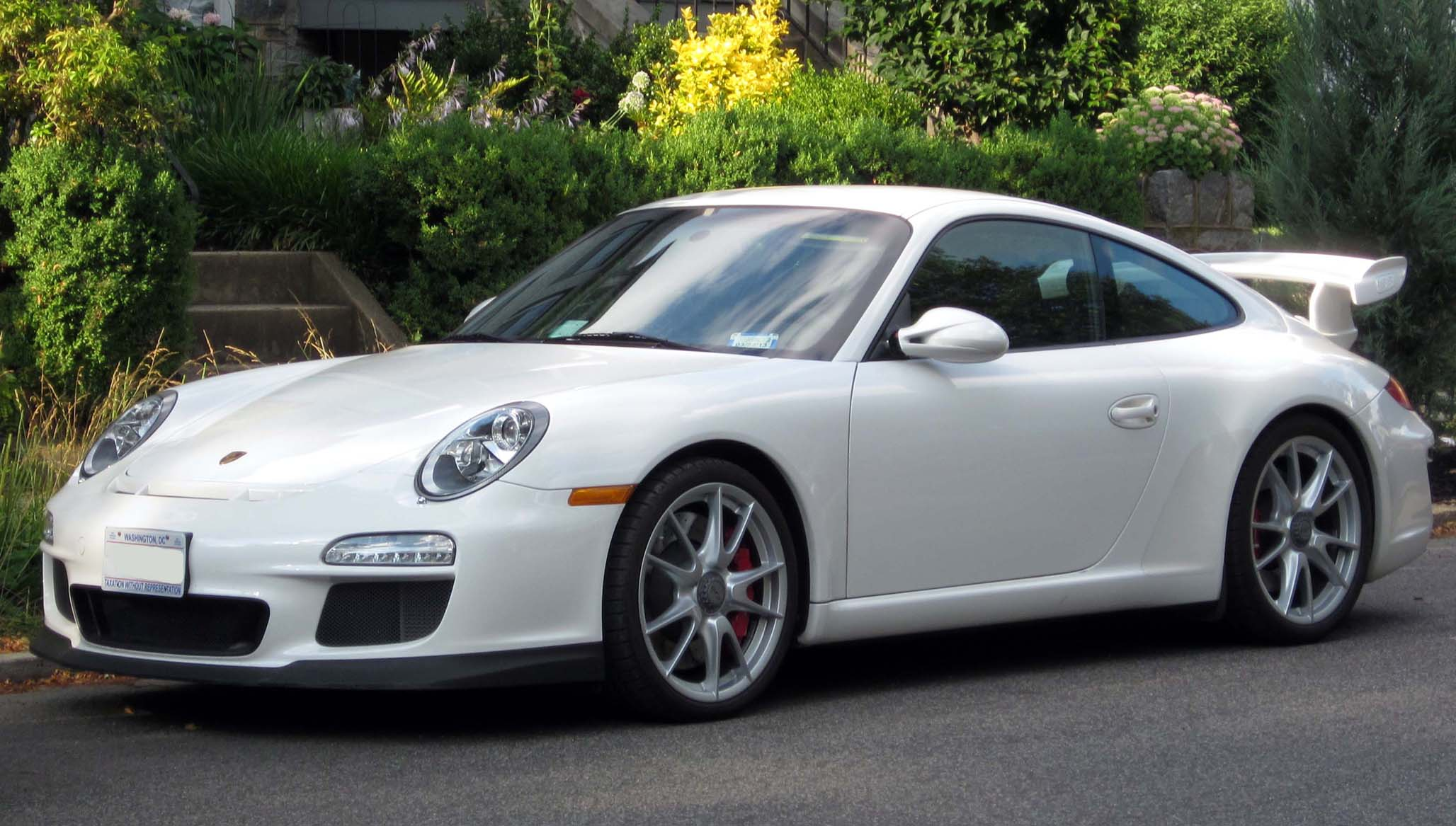
Porsche 997 GT3 (post-facelift) front

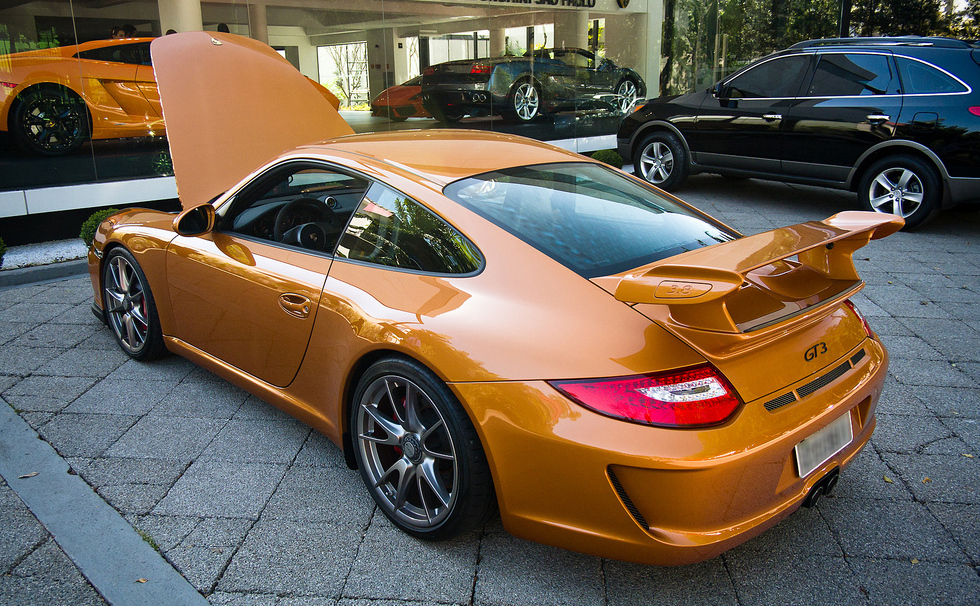
Porsche 997 GT3 (post-facelift) rear

==== 997.2 GT3 RS ====
For 2010, the second generation 911 GT3 RS (known as 997.2 GT3 RS) received an additional 11 kW; 15 hp (15 PS) due to a new 3.8-litre flat-6 engine, bringing total power output up to 331 kW; 444 hp (450 PS). Its transmission received a shorter final drive of 9:35 and a taller 6th gear of 0.88 ratio compared to other 997 GT3 variants’ 9:31 and 0.92 respectively. The car was not approved for competition in the United States by IMSA American LeMans. Grand-Am originally did not approve the car, but after performance issues (a Porsche team did not compete at the Indy Grand Prix of Alabama round), Grand-Am approved the second-generation car in April 2010.

Porsche test drivers had intended to enter the 2011 12 Hours of Nürburgring on a standard road legal 911 GT3 RS, but had to withdraw for health reasons from the team that comprised racers Roland Asch and Patrick Simon, plus journalists Horst von Saurma and Chris Harris. The car, entered in cooperation with sport auto (Germany), is registered as S-GO 2400, and was driven from Weissach to Nürburg. The RS was modified according to safety requirements, which included a larger roll cage and fire extinguisher. As no race tyres were available for 19" wheels, the 18" wheels of the Carrera Cup racers were used. Asch qualified with 9:15, 42nd overall, and 9th among the 17 SP7 class entrants, only beaten by its race-prepared Porsche 997 siblings. In an otherwise disappointing race for Porsche, with the best race 997 finishing only 6th, the road-legal car did 145 laps, 9 less than the winning BMW, for place 13. It supposedly had to cover another 306 km, on the Autobahn back home.

A total of 541 units sold in the United States and 71 units in Canada.

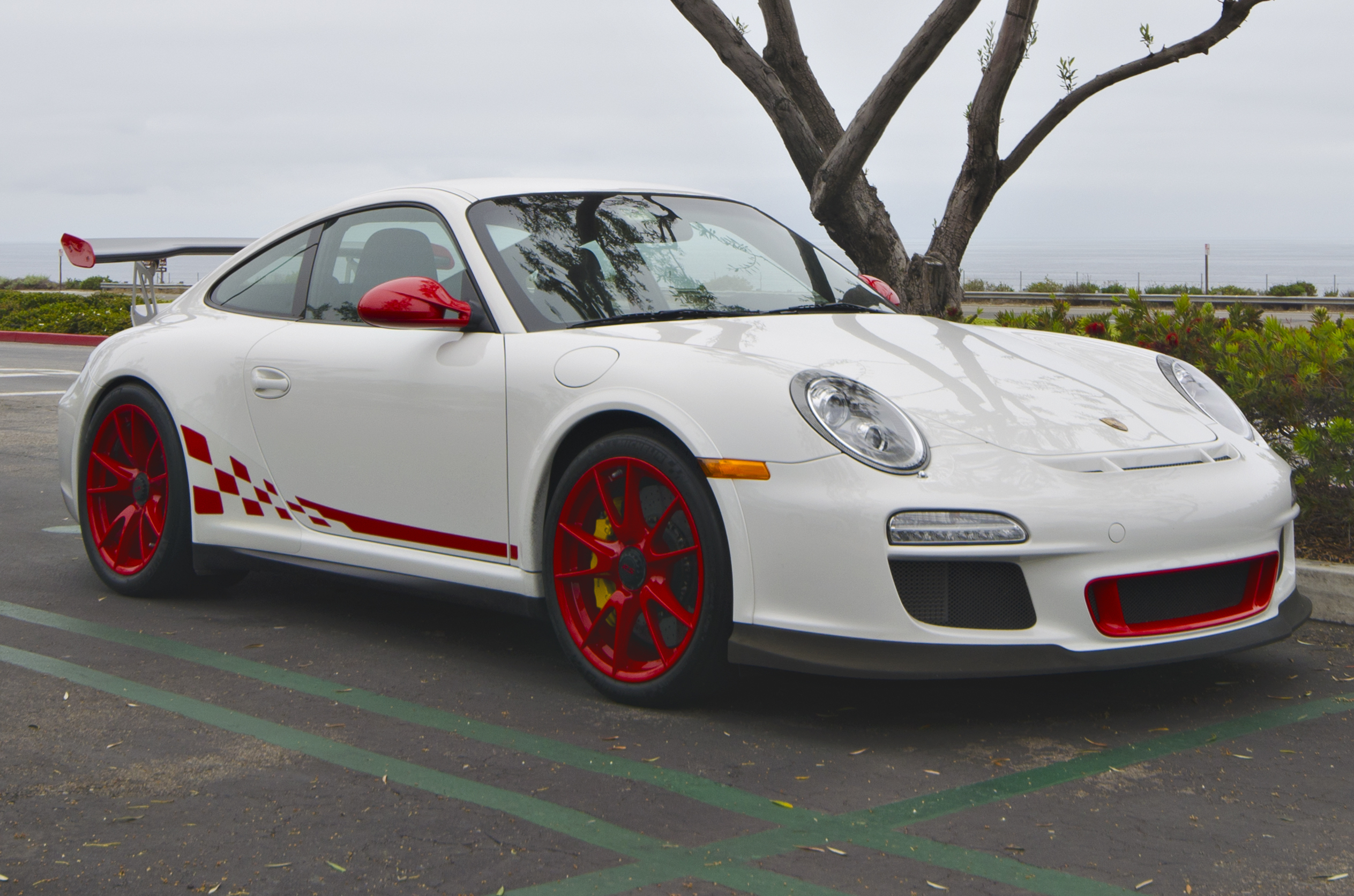
Porsche 997 GT3 RS (post-facelift) front

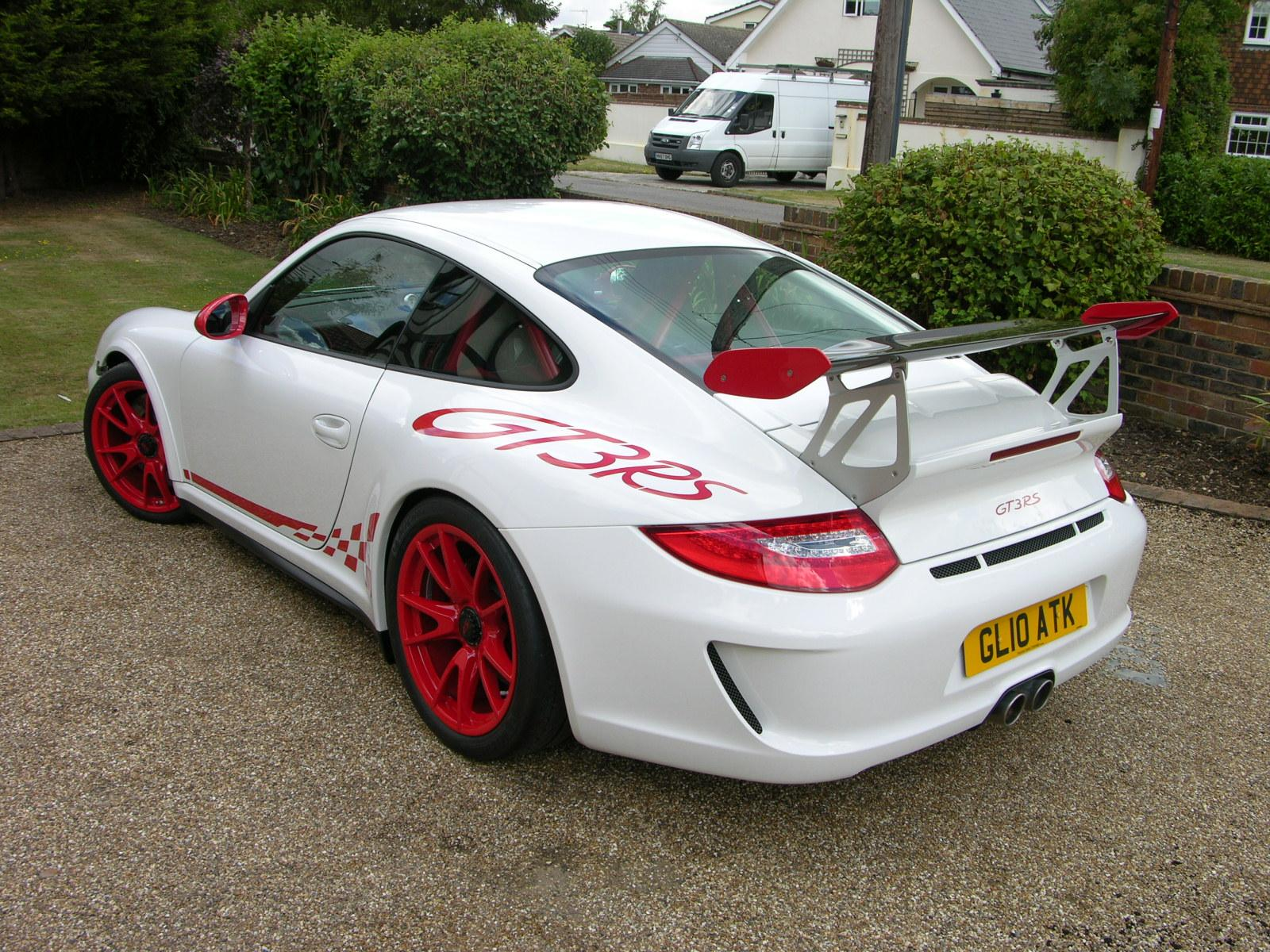
2010 Porsche 997 GT3 RS (post-facelift) rear

==== 997.2 GT3 RS 4.0 ====
The 911 GT3 RS 4.0, launched in 2011, was the final evolution of the 997 GT3 and featured a 4.0 litre flat-six engine (the largest engine offered in a street-legal 911). The engine itself uses the crankshaft from the RSR with increased stroke dimensions (from 76.4 mm to 80.4 mm). This change increased the power output to 368 kW; 493 hp (500 PS) at 8,250 rpm and 460 N⋅m (339 lbf⋅ft) of torque at 5,750 rpm. Chassis development was influenced by the GT2 RS and uses parts from other RS 911s. Front dive planes give additional downforce up front. The car weighs in at 1,360 kg (2,998 lb), giving it a power-to-weight ratio of 272 kW (365 hp) per tonne. Only 600 cars were built. At 368 kW (493 hp), the engine is one of the most powerful six-cylinder naturally aspirated engines in any production car with a 92 kW (123.25 hp) per litre output.

Performance figures include 0–97 km/h (0–60 mph) acceleration time of 3.5 seconds and a top speed of 311 km/h (193 mph). The lap time on the Nürburgring Nordschleife is 7 minutes and 27 seconds.

The car was offered in Basalt Black, Carrera White, Paint to Sample Non Metallic and Paint to Sample Metallic colours. A total of 141 units were sold in the United States and 16 units in Canada.

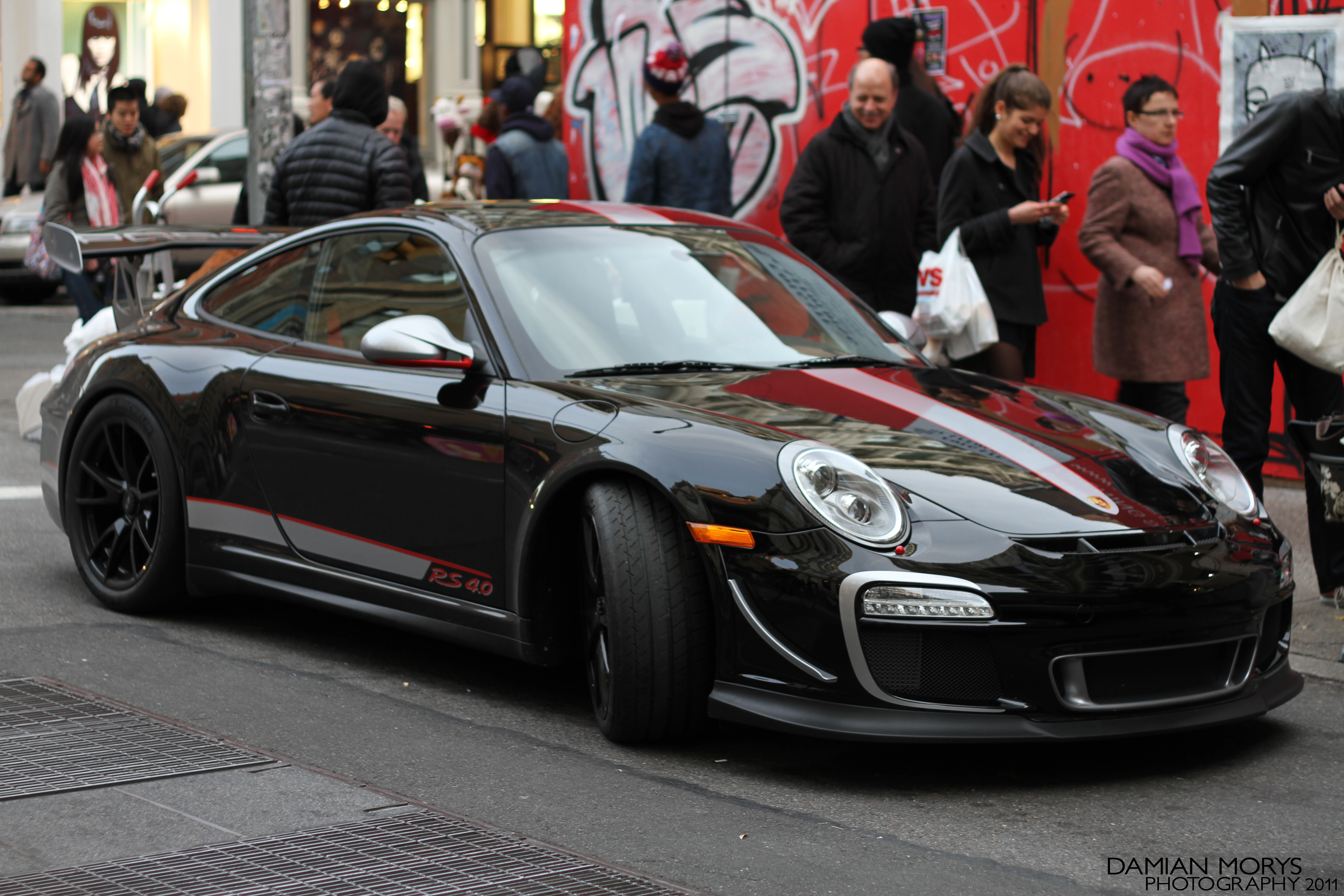
2011 Porsche 997 GT3 RS 4.0 front

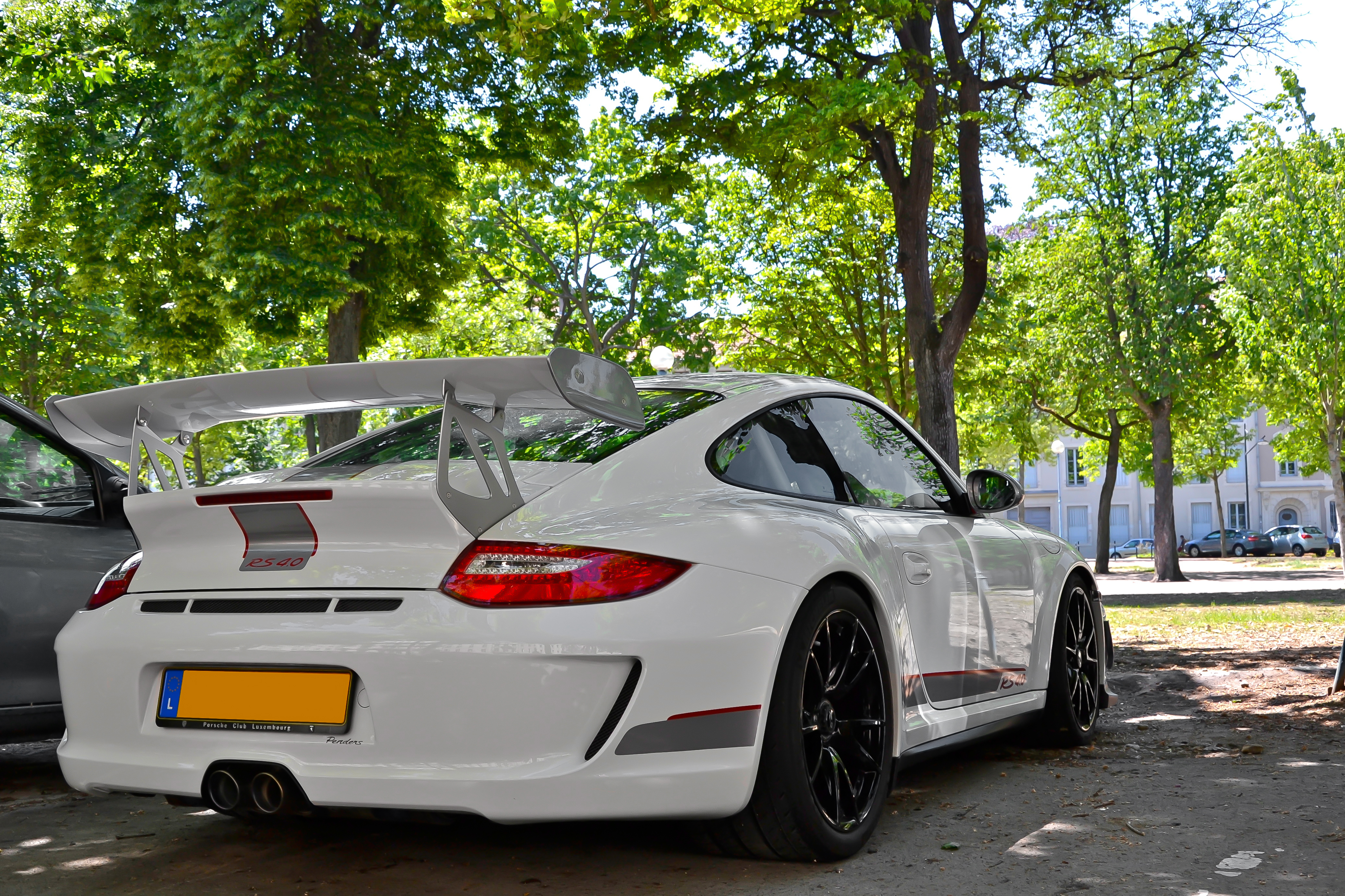
Porsche 997 GT3 RS 4.0 rear

=== 991 GT3 ===
991 GT3
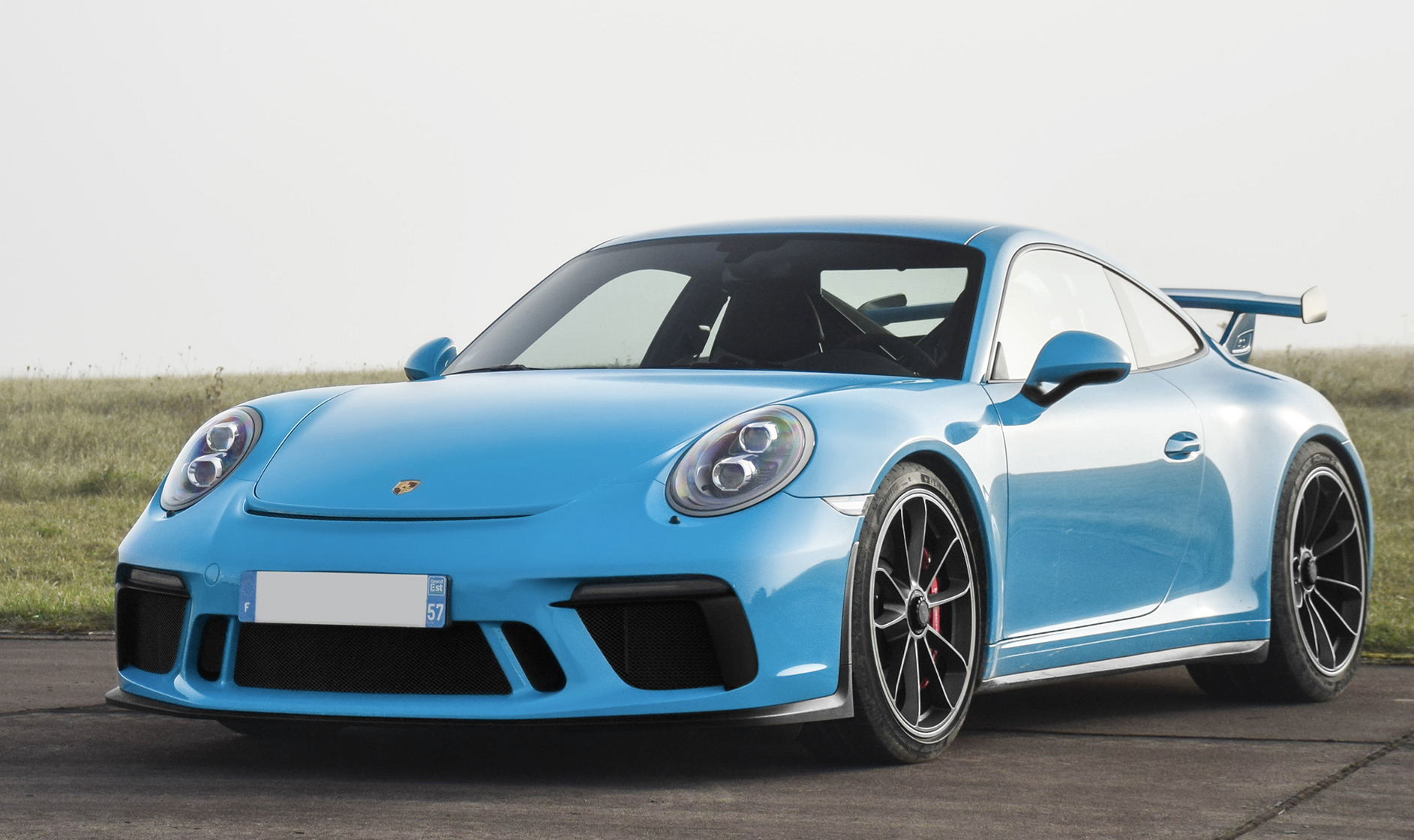

Overview
- Production: 2013–2019

Powertrain
- Engine: 3.8 L Porsche MA1.75/MDG.GA Flat-6 (991.1 - gasoline indirect injection); 4.0 L Porsche MA1.76/MDG.G Flat-6 (991.2 - gasoline direct injection)
- Power output: 349–368 kW; 469–493 hp (475–500 PS) (2013–2017); 368–382 kW; 493–513 hp (500–520 PS) (2017–2018)
- Transmission: 6-speed manual (991.2 only); 7-speed PDK

Dimensions
- Wheelbase: 2,457 mm (96.75 in)
- Length: 4,545 mm (178.94 in)
- Width: 1,852 mm (72.91 in)
- Height: 1,269 mm (49.96 in)
- Curb weight: 1,430 kg (3,153 lb)

==== 991.1 GT3 ====
Porsche introduced the 991 GT3 at the Geneva Motor Show in 2013. The 991 GT3 features a new 3.8 litre multi-point electronic indirect injection flat-six engine developing 349 kW; 469 hp (475 PS) at 8,250 rpm, a Porsche Doppelkupplung (PDK) double-clutch gearbox and rear-wheel steering. The engine is based on the unit fitted in the 991 Carrera S, but shares only a few common parts. All other components, particularly the crankshaft and valve train, were specially adapted or developed for the 991 GT3. For example, the 991 GT3's engine uses titanium connecting rods attached to forged pistons, in order to allow the engine to reach up to 9,000 rpm. The dual-clutch gearbox is another feature specially developed for the 991 GT3, based on sequential manual transmissions used in racing cars.

The 911 GT3 is claimed to be able to accelerate from 0–97 km/h (0–60 mph) in 3.5 seconds or less, and 400 m (the quarter mile) in 11.2 seconds at 203 km/h (126 mph). The GT3 has a claimed top speed of 325 km/h (202 mph). The lap time on the Nürburgring Nordschleife is 7 minutes and 25 seconds.

After a number of engine failures in 2014, it was discovered that the supplier of the connecting rod bolts had made a production error in the alloy of the bolt. Subsequently, all 785 of the GT3s that had been produced up to that point were recalled and fitted with new engines, and all owners were issued with an extra year's warranty.

Following reports of valvetrain wear, Porsche conducted an extensive investigation and implemented a series of engineering updates including revisions to finger follower and camshaft specifications, lubrication and durability testing. Many of these enhancements were incorporated into the G-series engines, which were developed alongside the 4.0-litre engines used in the GT3 RS and 911 R. Porsche further reinforced owner confidence by providing a fully transferable 10-year, 120,000-mile engine warranty and replacement engines incorporating the latest updates. Porsche maintained that the GT3 RS and 911 R were not affected by the valvetrain issue.

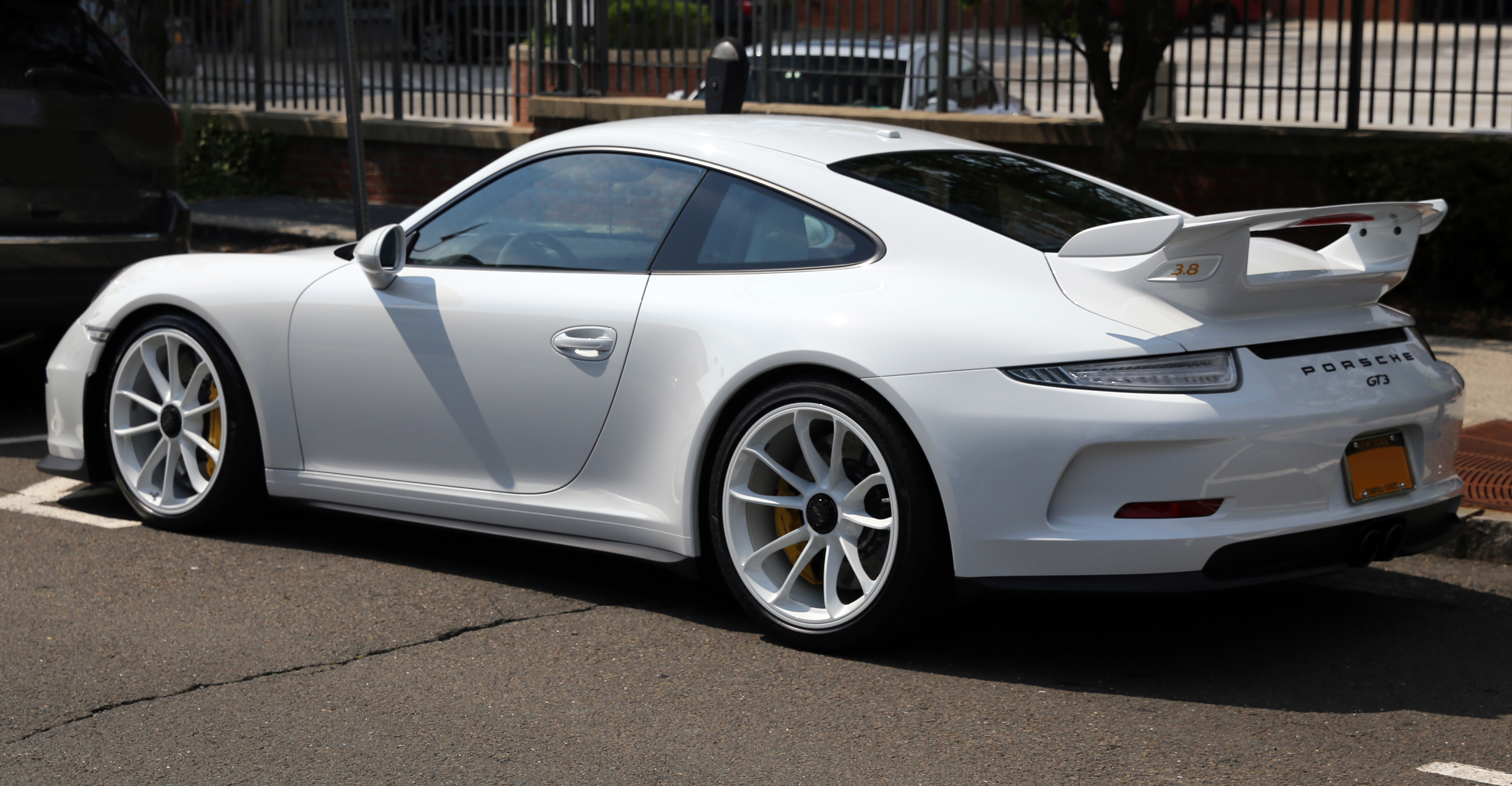
Porsche 911 GT3 (991) rear

==== 991.1 GT3 RS ====
Porsche launched the RS version of the 911 GT3 at the Geneva Motor Show in 2015. Compared to the 911 GT3, the front fenders are now equipped with louvers above the wheels and the rear fenders now include Turbo-like intakes, rather than an intake below the rear wing. The roof is made from magnesium. The interior includes full bucket seats (based on the carbon seats of the 918 Spyder), carbon-fibre inserts, lightweight door handles and the Club Sport Package as standard (a bolted-on roll cage behind the front seats, preparation for a battery master switch, and a six-point safety harness for the driver and fire extinguisher with mounting bracket).The car was nominated as one of the Britain's best driver's car 2014 by Autocar magazine.

The 3.8-litre unit found in the 911 GT3 is replaced with a 4.0-litre unit with 368 kW; 493 hp (500 PS) and 469 N⋅m (346 lb⋅ft) of torque. The transmission is PDK only. The drivetrain delivers 0–100 km/h (0–62 mph) in 3.4 seconds (0.6 seconds quicker than the 997 GT3 RS 4.0) and 0–200 km/h (0–124 mph) in 10.9 seconds. The 991 GT3 RS also comes with functions such as declutching by "paddle neutral" — comparable to pressing the clutch with a conventional manual gearbox — and Pit Speed limiter button. As with the 911 GT3, there is rear-axle steering and Porsche Torque Vectoring Plus with fully variable rear axle differential lock. The Nürburgring Nordschleife time is 7 minutes and 20 seconds.

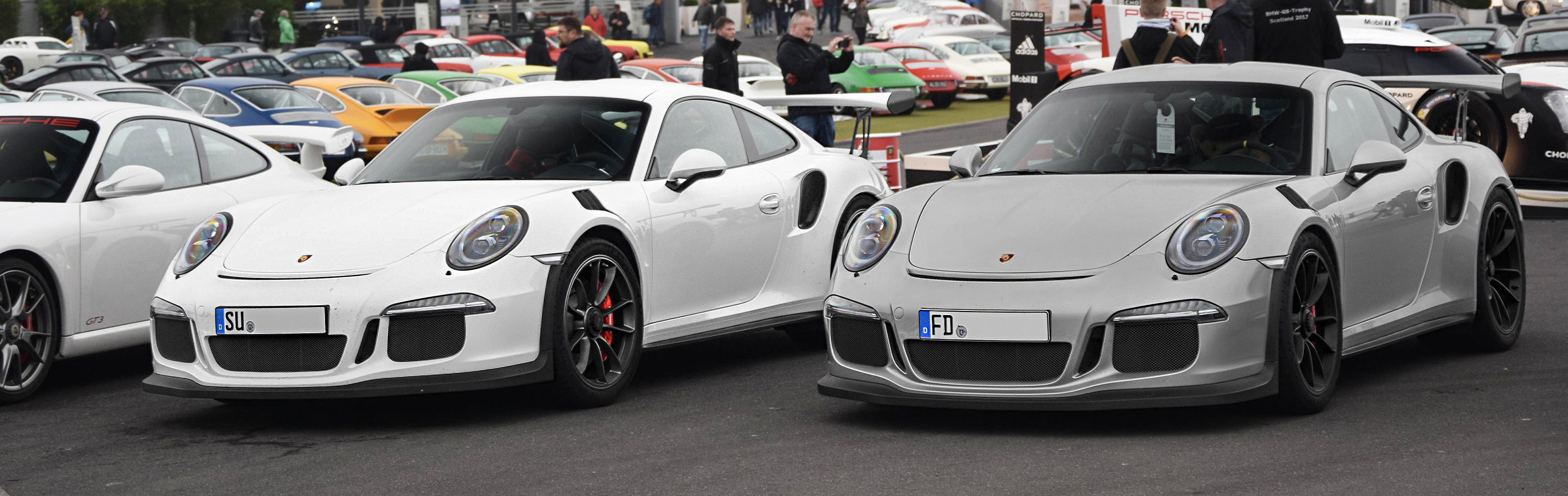
Porsche 991 GT3 RS front

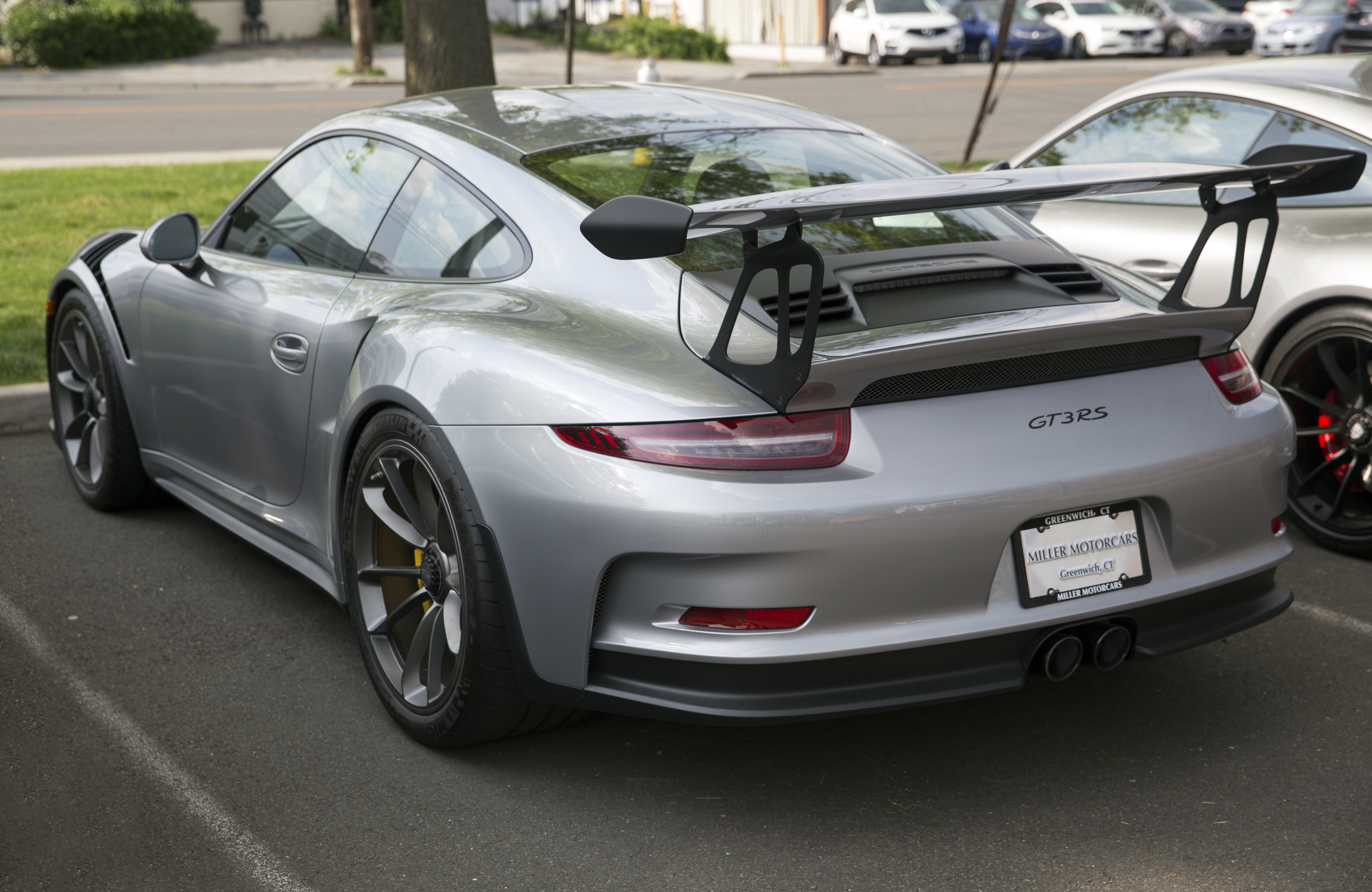
Porsche 991 GT3 RS rear

==== 991.2 GT3 ====
Porsche unveiled the facelifted 991.2 GT3 at the 2017 Geneva Motor Show. Extensive changes were made to the engine allowing for a 9,000 rpm redline from the 4.0 litre flat-six engine derived from Porsche 911 GT3 R and Cup racing cars as well as more-efficient gasoline direct injection fuel feed system. The engine has a power output of 368 kW; 493 hp (500 PS) and 460 N⋅m (339 lb⋅ft) of torque. Porsche's focus was on reducing internal friction to improve throttle response. Compared to the 991.1, the rear spoiler is 20 mm (0.8 in) taller and located farther back to be more effective resulting in a 20% increase in downforce. There is a new front spoiler and changes to the rear suspension along with larger ram air ducts. The car generates 154 kg (340 lb) of downforce at top speed. The 991.2 GT3 brought back the choice between a manual transmission or a PDK dual clutch transmission.

Performance figures include a 0–97 km/h (0–60 mph) acceleration time of 3.8 seconds (3.2 seconds for the PDK version) and a 400 m (quarter mile) time of 11.6 seconds. The GT3 can attain a top speed of 319 km/h (198 mph).

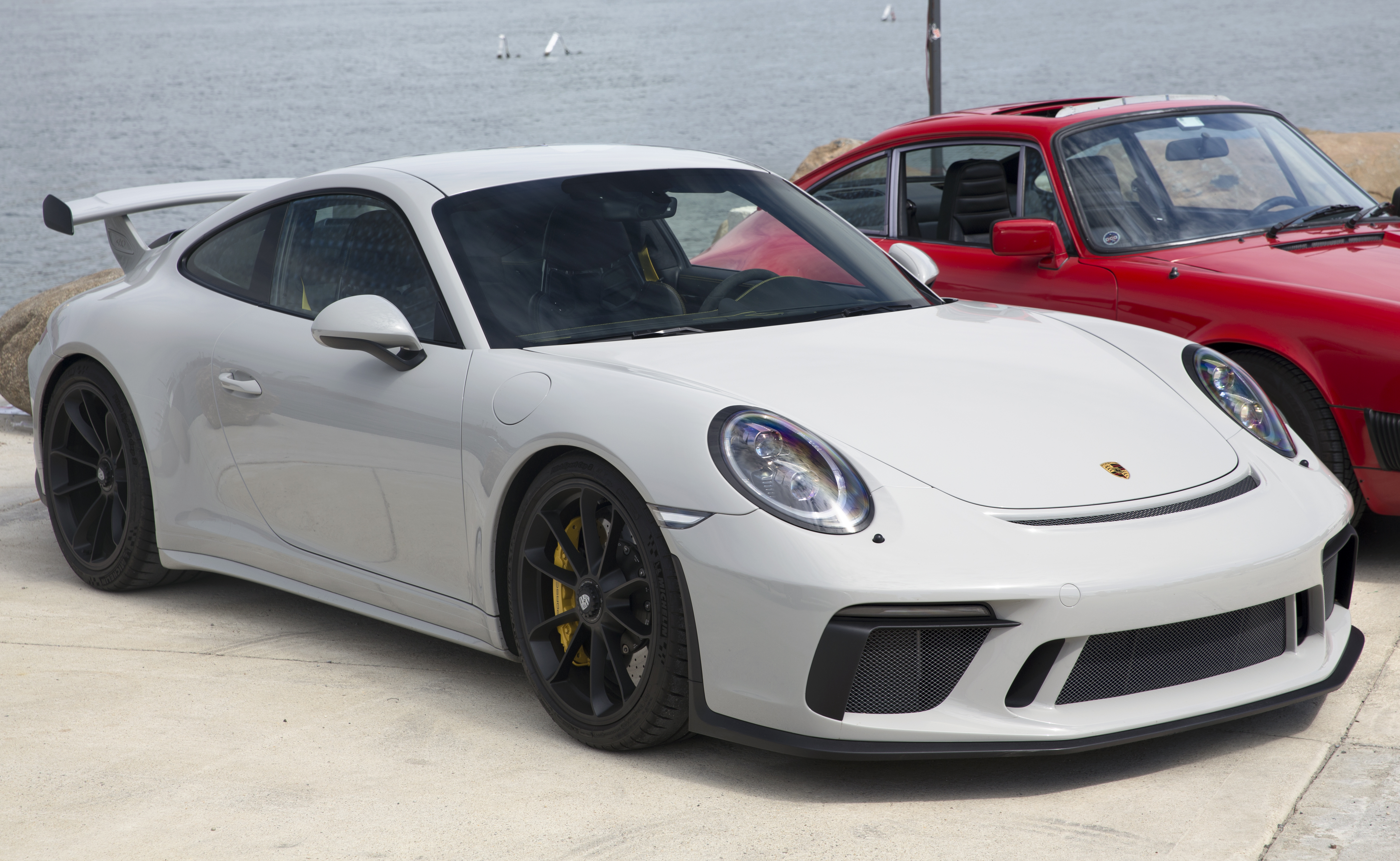
Porsche 911 GT3 (991.2)

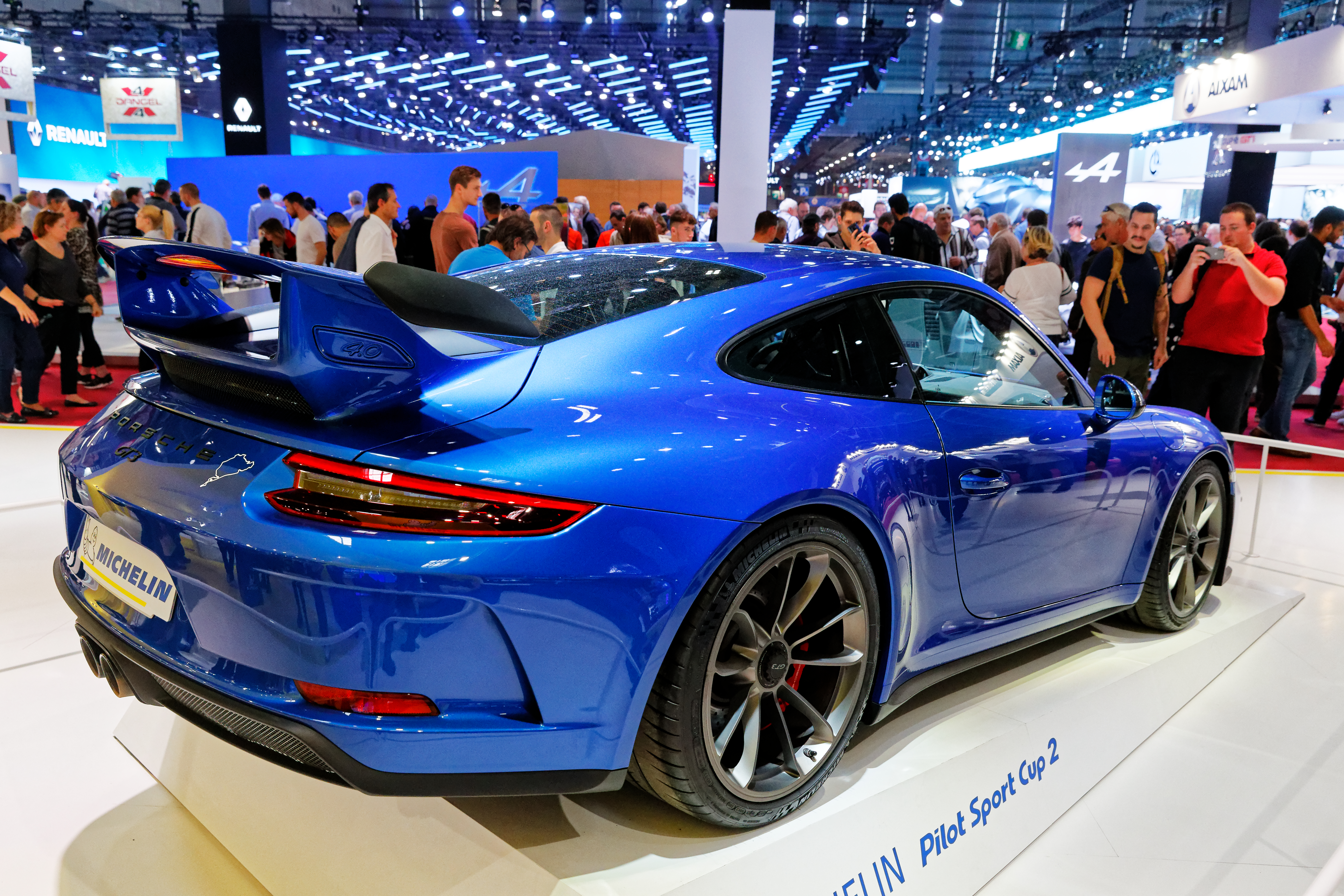
Porsche 911 GT3 (991.2) rear

==== GT3 Touring ====
Following the success of the 2016 991.1 911 R and consumer demand for Porsche GT division 911 models with a 6-speed manual transmission, a touring version of the GT3 was introduced. The Touring removes the GT3's rear wing and replaces it with the modified retractable rear spoiler from the Carrera GTS (with a Gurney flap and 20-degree deployment angle) to give a more smooth and flowing aesthetic image, though it extends further upwards to provide extra downforce. The spoiler deploys at 120 km/h (75 mph) and retracts at 80 km/h (50 mph). It can also be manually deployed by the press of a button. The downforce is 104 kg (230 lb) less than the standard GT3 at top speed. Top speed is also reduced to 315 km/h (196 mph). The Touring is only available with a manual transmission, features leather versus Alcantara, and cannot be specified with the Clubsport package available with the normal GT3. Other options and features remain the same as the GT3. The suspension settings are said to be identical to the standard GT3 as is the engine. However, the air intake replaces the normal GT3's box paper air filters with a conic high flow BMC air filters and adds membrane on the two air filter chambers under the gurney flap that are the reasons of the sound differences between the normal GT3 and the GT3 Touring.

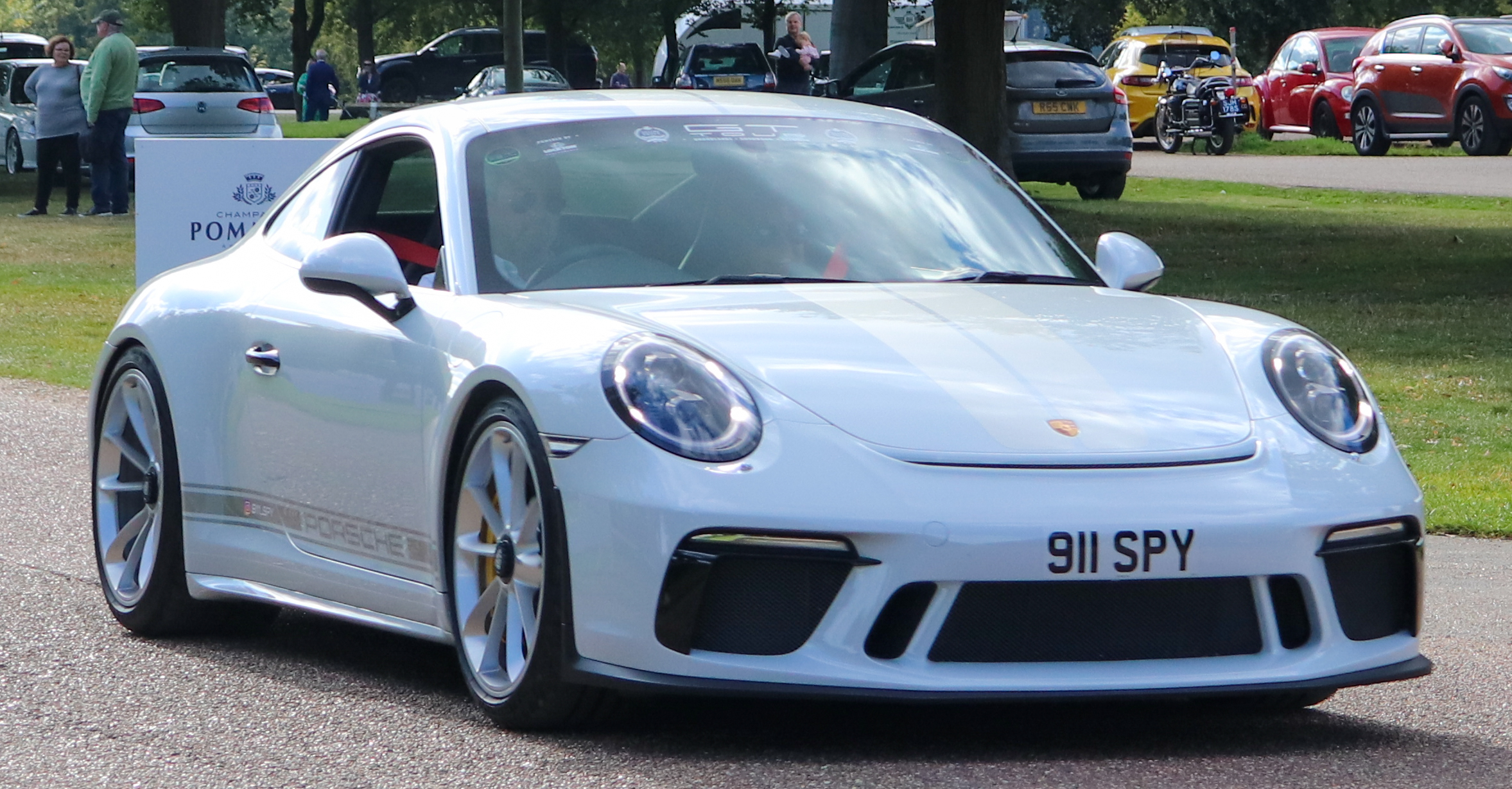
Porsche 911 GT3 Touring (991.2)

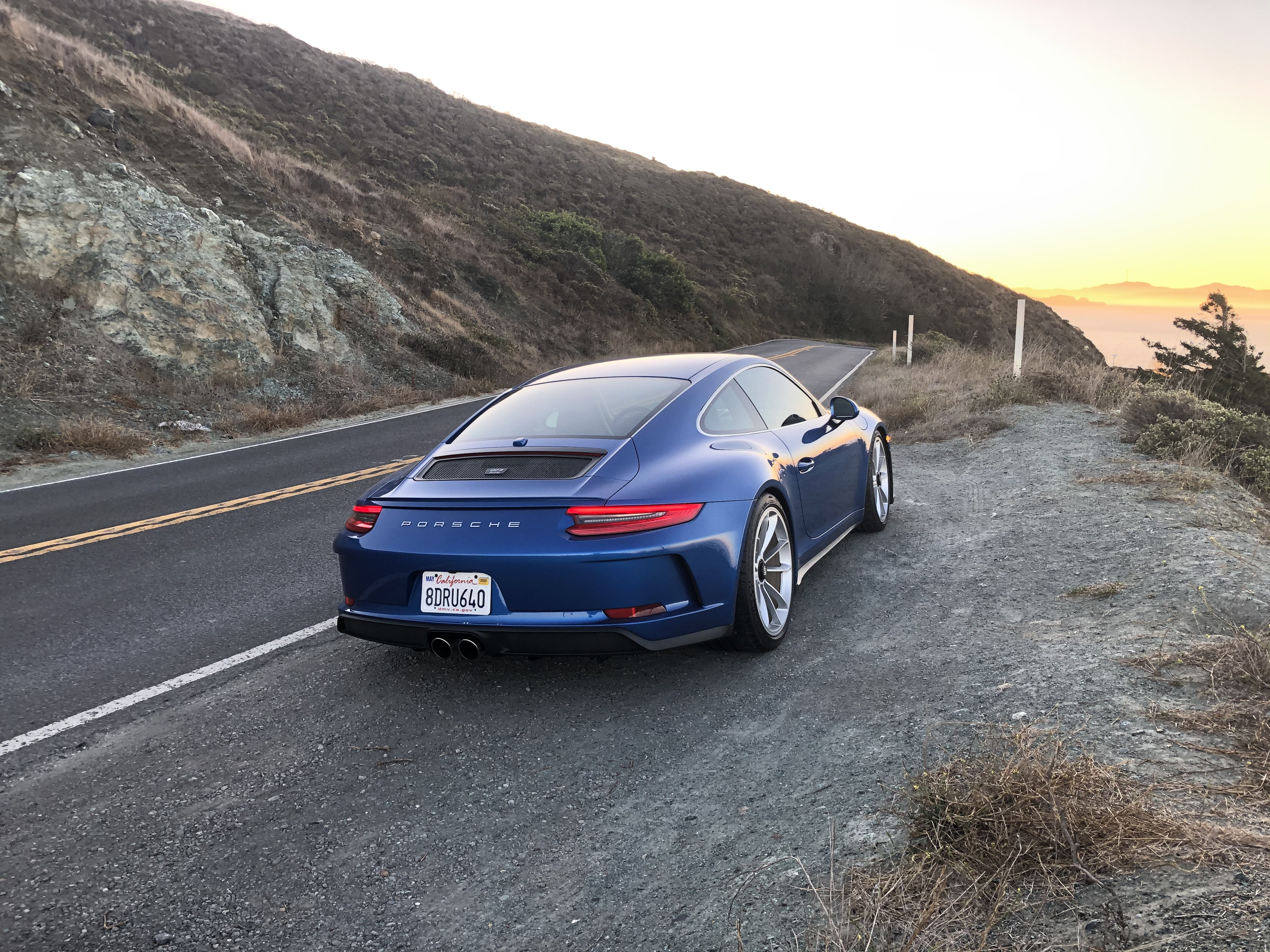
Porsche 911 GT3 Touring (991.2) rear

==== 991.2 GT3 RS ====
In February 2018, Porsche unveiled a facelifted GT3 RS model to continue their updates for the 991 generation of the 911. Changes include a new engine similar to the GT3 and RSR models with a 9,000 rpm redline and 20 PS (15 kW; 20 hp) and 10 N⋅m (7.4 lb⋅ft) increase over the previous GT3 RS, NACA ducts for brake cooling, modified front fascia (similar to the 991.2 GT3), side skirts and rear wing (similar to the GT2 RS) for increased downforce, ball joints on all suspension links, front helper springs, lightweight glass for the rear and rear-side windows and a newly developed tire compound. A Weissach package including additional carbon fibre body and interior parts as well as magnesium wheels made by BBS and stiffer suspension settings is available as an option.

On 18 April 2018, driven by Kévin Estre the 991.2 GT3 RS set a lap time of 6:56.4 around the Nürburgring Nordschleife. It is the third Porsche production car to break the 7 minute barrier around the track, the first being the 918 Spyder.

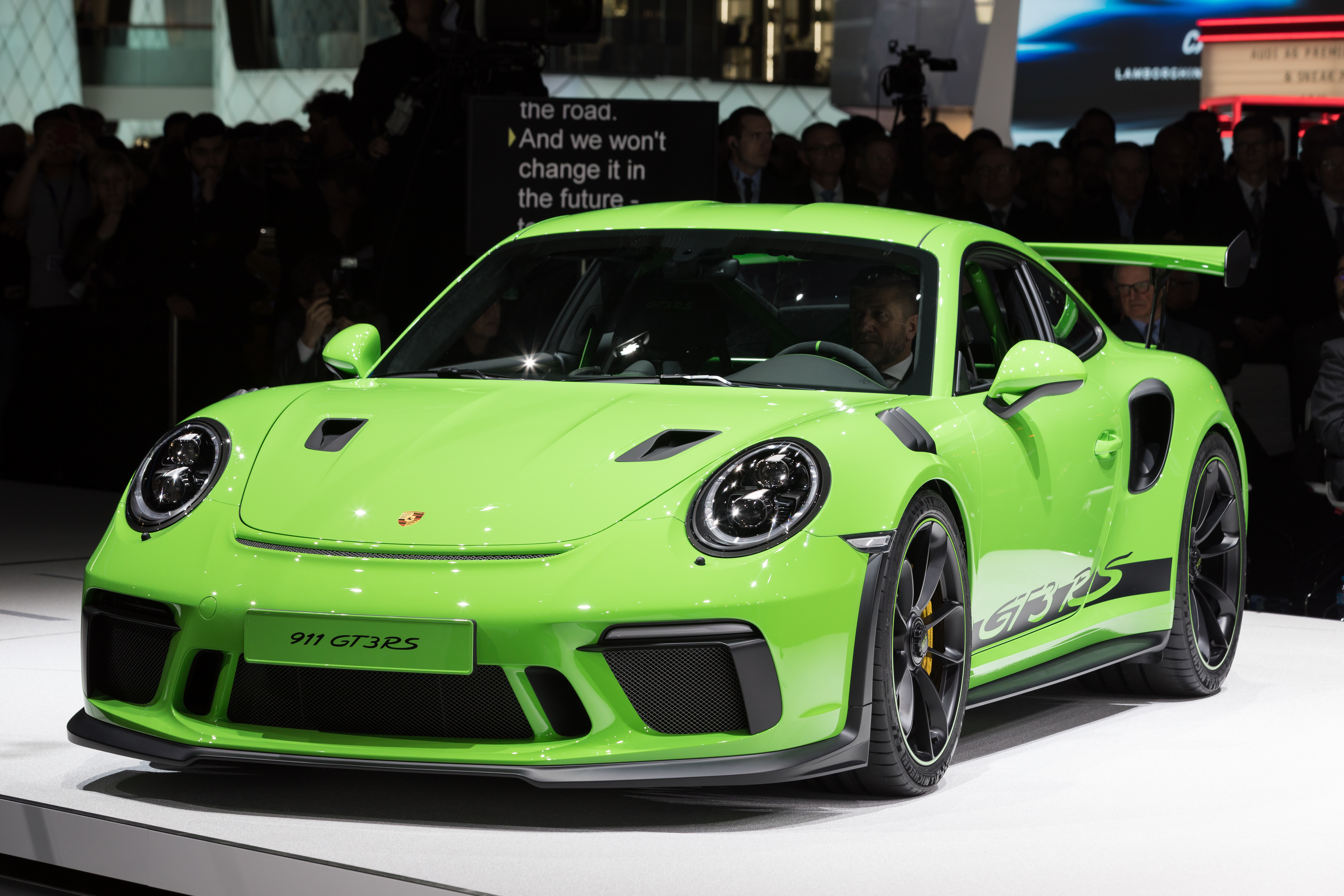
Porsche 911 GT3 RS (991.2)

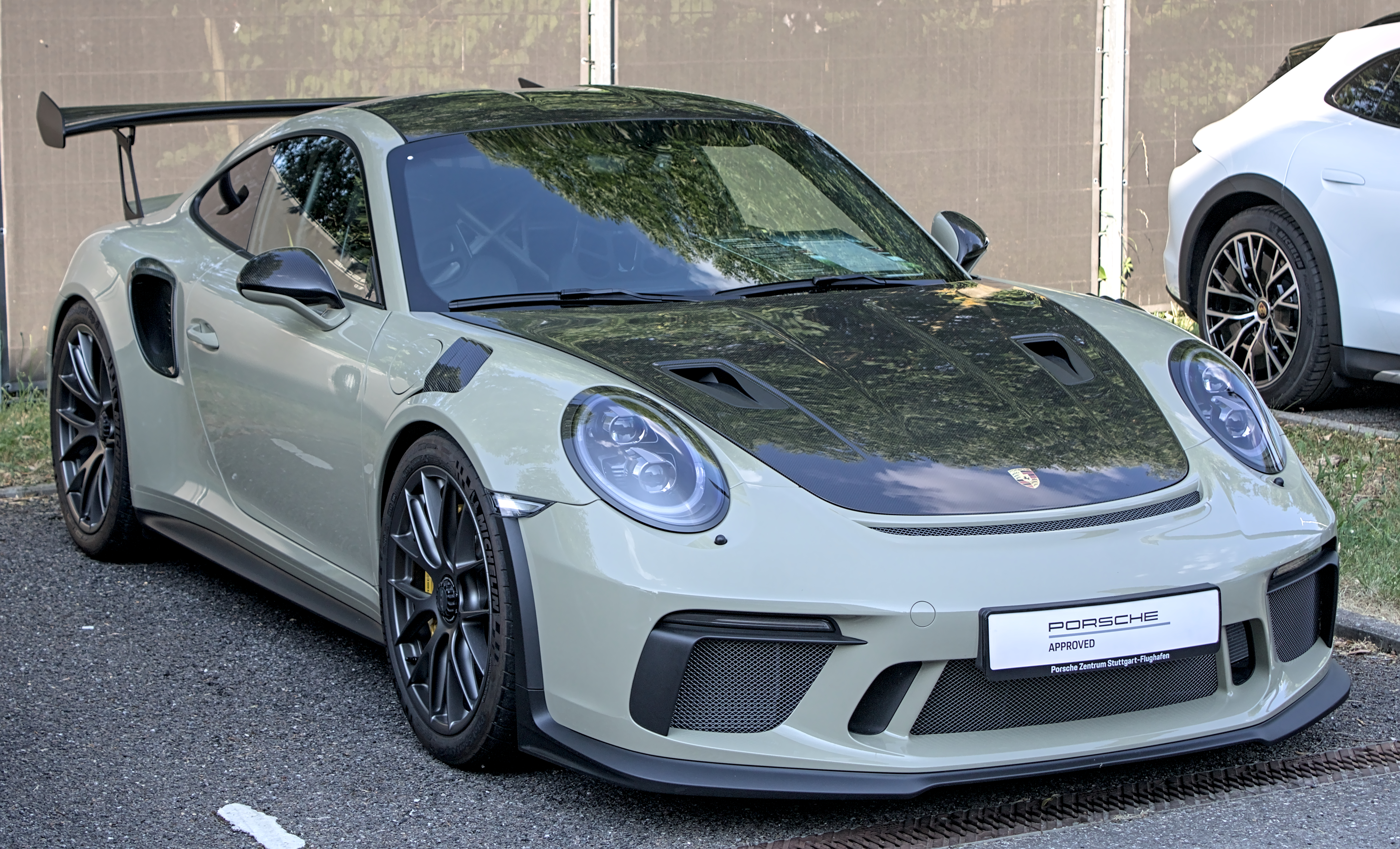
Porsche 911 GT3 RS (991.2) with Weissach package

=== 992 GT3 ===
992 GT3
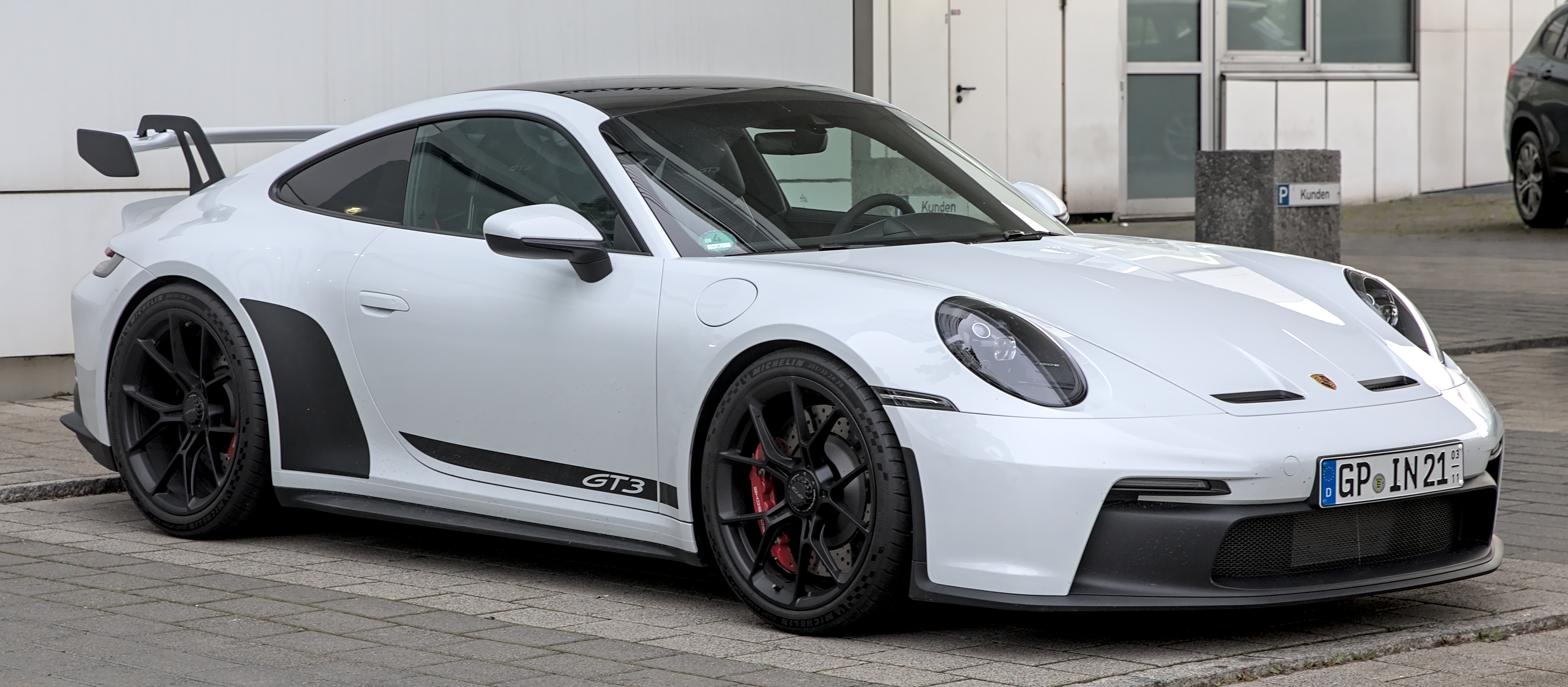

Overview
- Production: 2021–present
- Designer: Stéphane Lenglin; Fabian Schmölz (GT3 RS)

Body and chassis
- Platform: MMB (Modular mid-engine platform)

Powertrain
- Engine: 3,996 cc (244 cu in) Porsche MA2.75 naturally-aspirated flat-6 (including GT3 RS)
- Power output: 510 PS (375 kW; 503 hp); 347 lb⋅ft (470 N⋅m) of torque
- Transmission: 6-speed manual (not available on the GT3 RS); 7-speed PDK (all variant models)

Dimensions
- Wheelbase: 2,457 mm (97 in)
- Length: 4,573 mm (180 in)
- Width: 1,852 mm (73 in)
- Height: 1,279 mm (50 in)
- Curb weight: 1,435 kg (3,164 lb)

Porsche revealed the 992 GT3 in February 2021. The 992 GT3 has the same engine as its predecessor, a 4.0-litre flat-six updated to produce 375 kW; 503 hp (510 PS) at 8,400 rpm and 470 N⋅m (347 lb⋅ft) of torque at 6,250 rpm, with a 9,000 rpm redline. The 992 GT3 is capable of 0–100 km/h (0–62 mph) in 3.4 seconds.Its top speed is 193 mph.

The 992 GT3 moves to an unequal-length control-arm front suspension influenced by the 991 RSR. The rear wing has swan-neck pylons with increased downforce compared to previous GT3 models. The GT3 is offered with either a seven-speed dual-clutch PDK or a six-speed manual.

On September 15, 2020, Porsche and driver Lars Kern set an official Nürburgring lap time of 6:55.34 in the 992 GT3.

==== 992 GT3 Touring ====
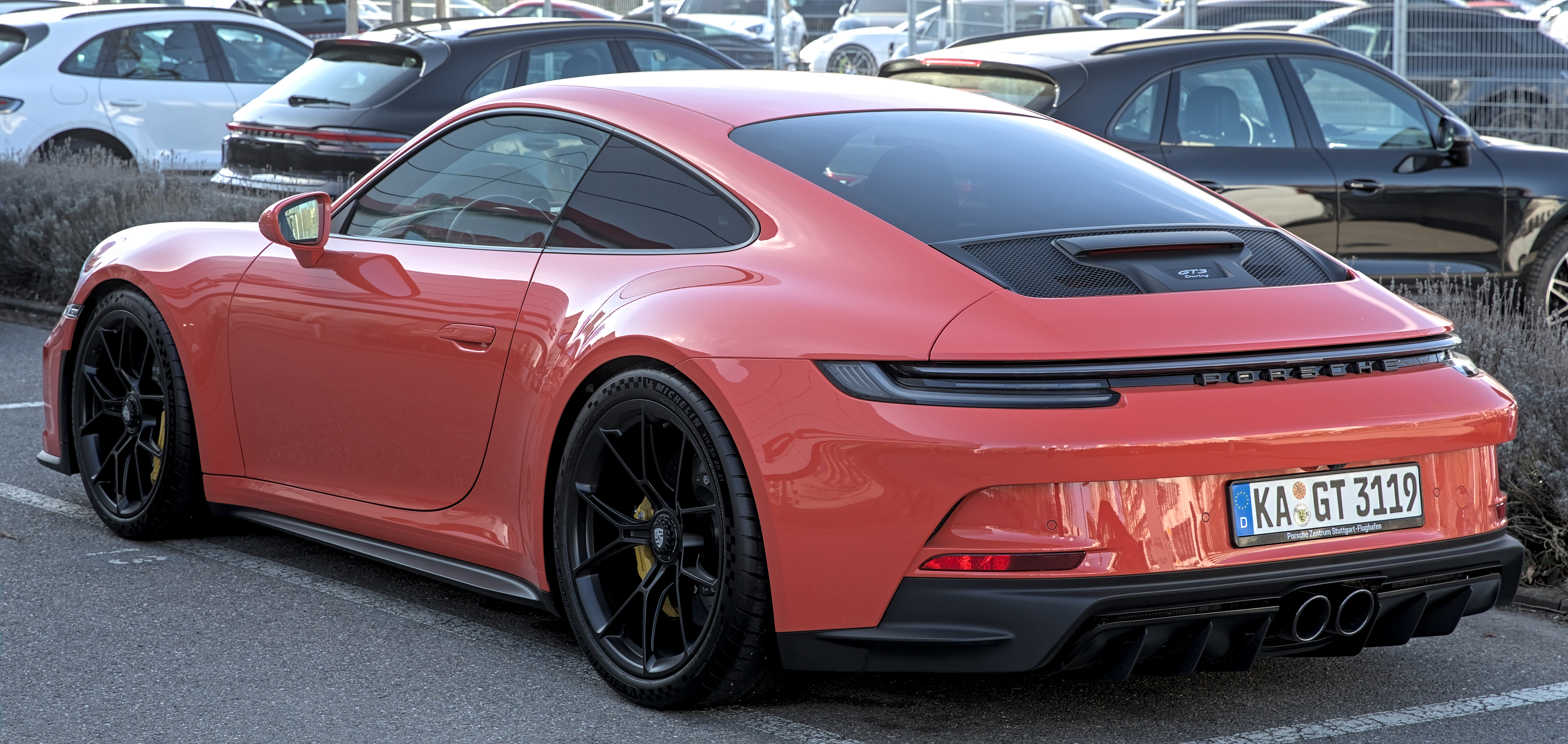
Porsche 992 GT3 Touring

A Touring package is available, which replaces the rear wing with an automatically deployable rear spoiler. It is available with a 6 speed manual transmission or 7 speed PDK - double clutch transmission.

==== 992.1 GT3 RS ====
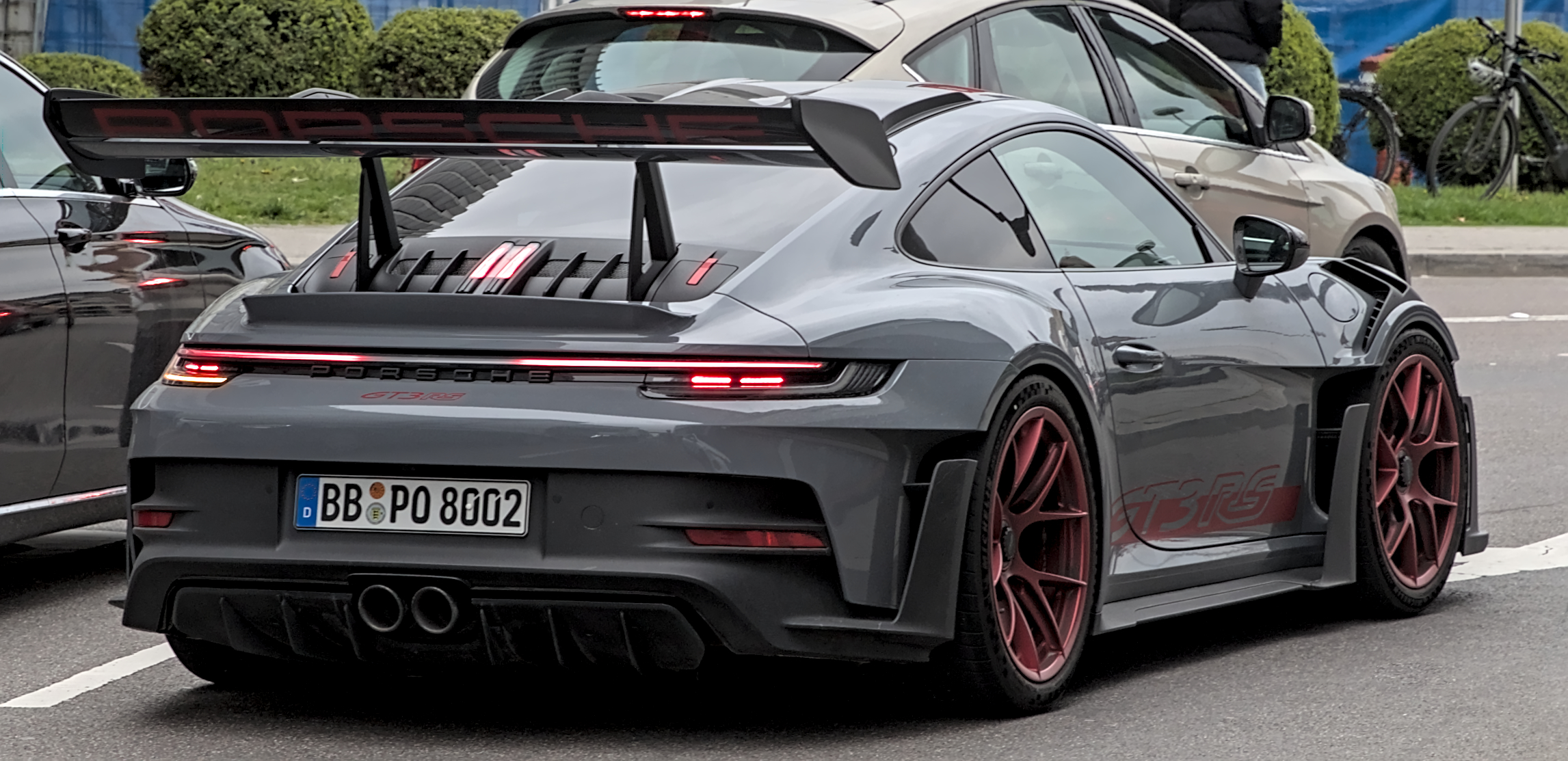
Porsche 911 GT3 RS

The 992 GT3 RS was announced in August 2022. It features a dramatically improved aerodynamic profile compared to the 992 GT3, resulting in 860 kg (1,900 lb) of downforce at 285 km/h (177 mph), a two-fold increase over the 991.2 GT3 RS, and 409 kg (902 lb) of downforce at 200 km/h (124 mph). The rear wing features a static portion and an active portion, which can open and close automatically based on vehicle data, or manually with a button fitted to the steering wheel (inspired by Formula 1's Drag Reduction Systems (DRS)).

Its engine produces 386 kW; 518 hp (525 PS) at 8,500 rpm and 465 N⋅m (343 lb⋅ft) of torque at 6,300 rpm. The car has a redline of 9,000 rpm (same as the GT3 done by its naturally aspirated flat-six engine) The curb weight of the car in European specification is 1,450 kg (3,197 lb), and it's capable of achieving 0–100 km/h (0–62 mph) in 3.2 seconds, and 200 km/h (124 mph) in 10.6 seconds. The top speed stated by Porsche is 296 km/h (184 mph).

On 5 October 2022, Porsche and driver Jörg Bergmeister set an official Nürburgring lap time of 6:44.848 in the 992 GT3 RS. At the time, this was the third fastest lap time ever by a production car. As of December 2024, this is the fastest lap time ever by a naturally aspirated production car.

=== 992.2 GT3 ===
Porsche revealed the 992.2 GT3 on October 18, 2024. It retained the 4.0 L (3,996 cc), 510 PS (375 kW; 503 hp), naturally-aspirated flat-6 engine as the 992.1. In addition, the engine makes 450 N⋅m (332 lb⋅ft) of torque, allowing the vehicle to accelerate from 0 to 100 km/h (62 mph) in 3.4 seconds, or 3.9 seconds with a six-speed manual transmission used in lieu of the dual-clutch transmission (PDK). The 992.2 GT3 has a lower than the 992.1, with a top speed of 311 km/h (193 mph).

The GT3 came with a six-speed manual transmission or PDK as options and, in contrast to the Carrera line of models, retained the ignition key while the lower-end options kept the button. Moreover, the GT3 may also be optioned out with the Weissach package from the GT3 RS, as well as a Clubsport package that can be purchased for free.

==== 992.2 GT3 Touring ====
The 992.2 GT3 Touring was revealed alongside, and shared the same amount of power and torque as, the GT3. However, its top speed was recorded as 313 km/h (194 mph).

Like the GT3, the GT3 Touring was also available with a six-speed manual transmission or PDK as options.

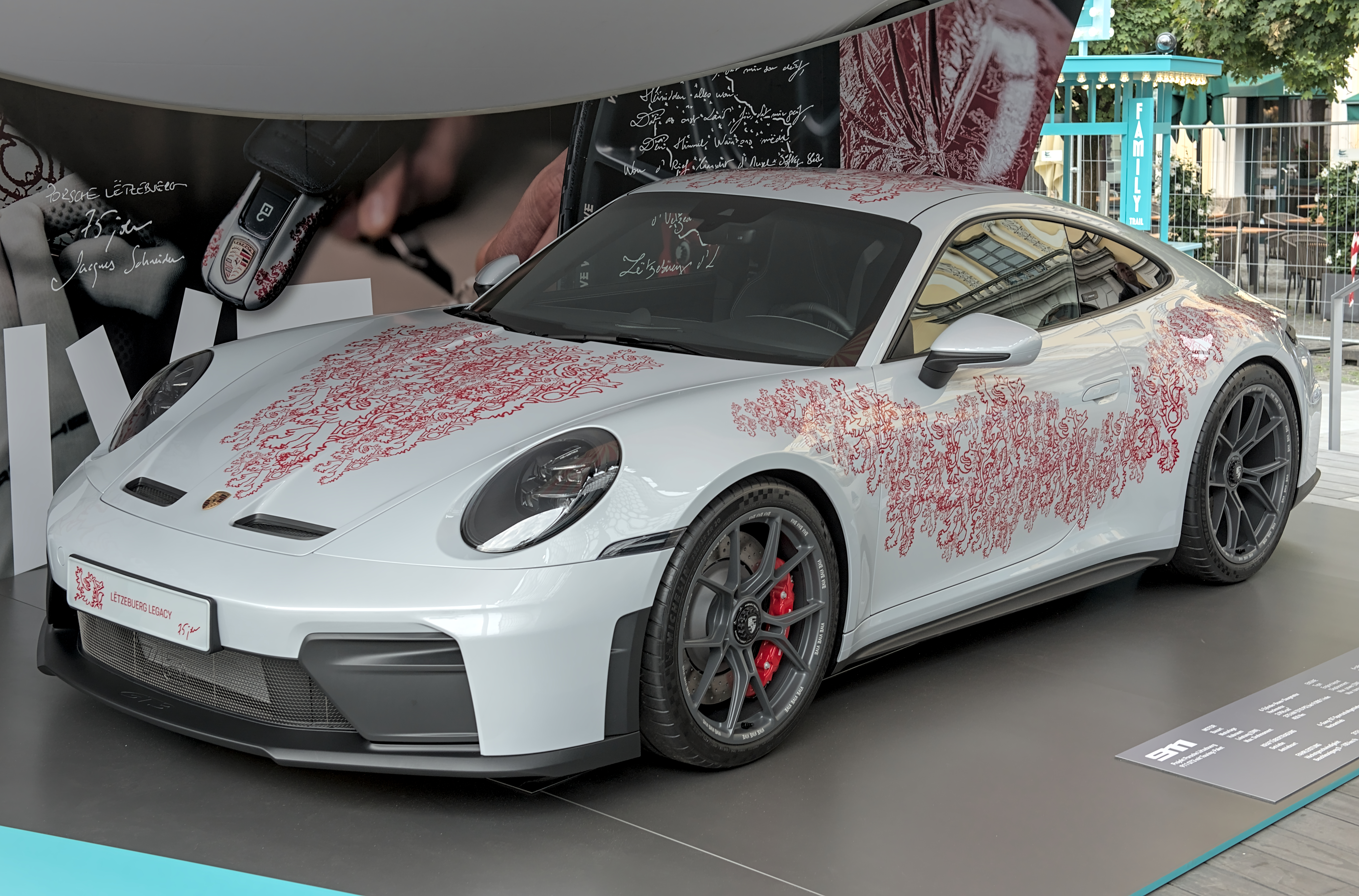
Porsche 992.2 GT3 Touring

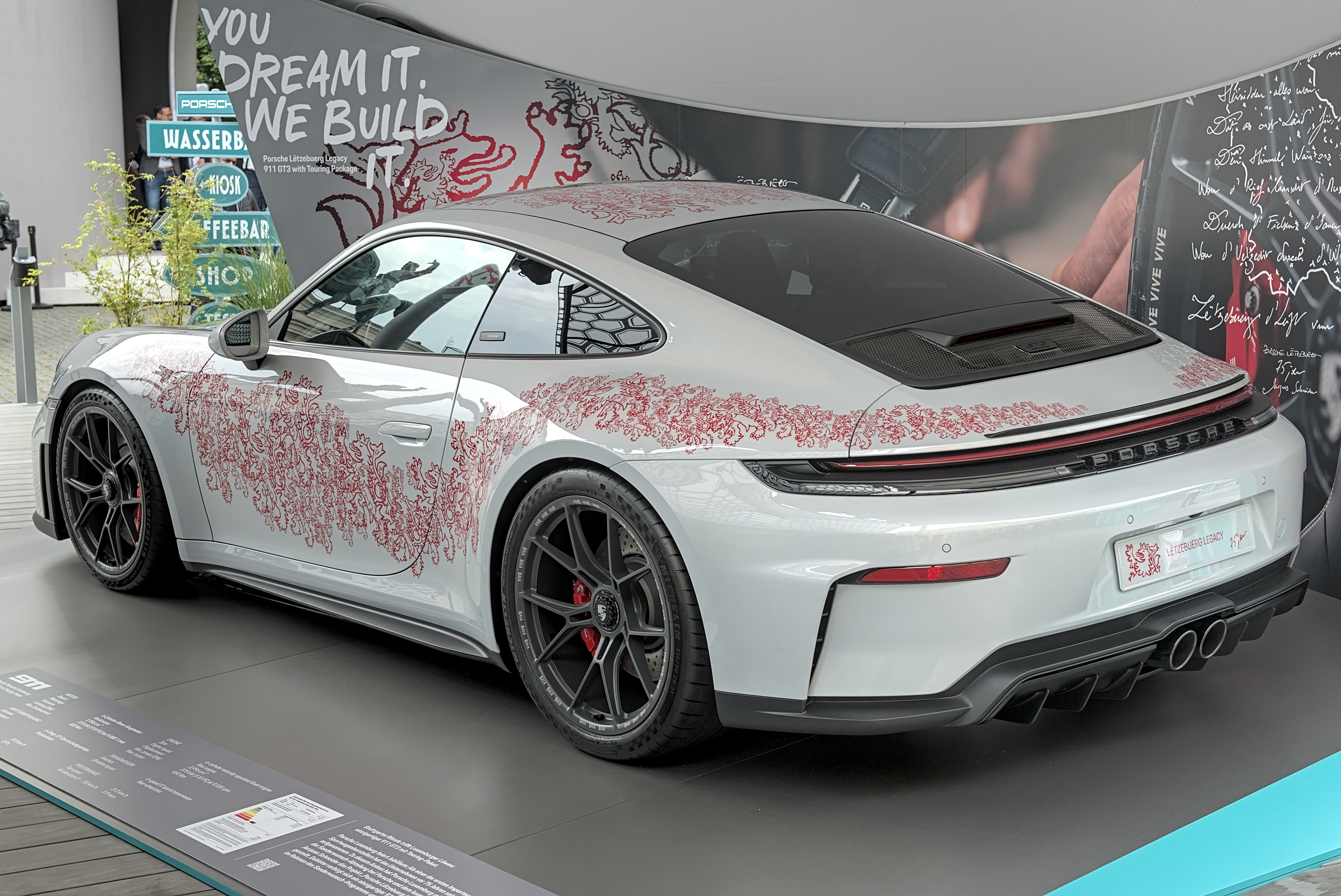
Rear view

== Specifications (road cars) ==
Car	Years of Production	Engine Displ. (cm^{3})	Power	Torque	DIN Kerb Weight	Units Built	0–100 km/h (0–62 mph)	Top speed
996.1 GT3	1999–2001	3,600	265 kW; 355 hp (360 PS)	370 N⋅m (273 lbf⋅ft)	1,350 kg (2,976 lb)	1,868	4.8 seconds (manual)	302 km/h (188 mph)
996.2 GT3	2003–2004	3,600	280 kW; 376 hp (381 PS)	385 N⋅m (284 lbf⋅ft)	1,380 kg (3,042 lb)	2,313	4.5 seconds (manual)	306 km/h (190 mph)
996.2 GT3 RS	2003–2004	3,600	280 kW; 376 hp (381 PS)	385 N⋅m (284 lbf⋅ft)	1,360 kg (2,998 lb)	682	4.4 seconds (manual)	306 km/h (190 mph)
997.1 GT3	2006–2009	3,600	305 kW; 409 hp (415 PS)	405 N⋅m (299 lbf⋅ft)	1,394 kg (3,073 lb)	2,378	4.3 seconds (manual)	310 km/h (193 mph)
997.1 GT3 RS	2006–2009	3,600	305 kW; 409 hp (415 PS)	405 N⋅m (299 lbf⋅ft)	1,375 kg (3,031 lb)	1,106	4.2 seconds (manual)	310 km/h (193 mph)
997.2 GT3	2009–2011	3,797	320 kW; 429 hp (435 PS)	430 N⋅m (317 lbf⋅ft)	1,394 kg (3,073 lb)	2,256	4.1 seconds (manual)	312 km/h (194 mph)
997.2 GT3 RS	2009–2011	3,797	331 kW; 444 hp (450 PS)	430 N⋅m (317 lbf⋅ft)	1,370 kg (3,020 lb)	2,000	4.0 seconds (manual)	310 km/h (193 mph)
997.2 GT3 RS 4.0	2011	3,996	368 kW; 493 hp (500 PS)	460 N⋅m (339 lbf⋅ft)	1,360 kg (2,998 lb)	600	3.9 seconds (manual)	310 km/h (193 mph)
991.1 GT3	2013–2016	3,799	349 kW; 469 hp (475 PS)	440 N⋅m (325 lbf⋅ft)	1,430 kg (3,153 lb)	6,300	3.5 seconds (PDK)	315 km/h (196 mph)
991.1 GT3 RS	2015–2017	3,996	368 kW; 493 hp (500 PS)	460 N⋅m (339 lbf⋅ft)	1,420 kg (3,131 lb)	4,500	3.3 seconds (PDK)	310 km/h (193 mph)
991.2 GT3	2017–2019	3,996	368 kW; 493 hp (500 PS)	460 N⋅m (339 lbf⋅ft)	1,430 kg (3,153 lb) (PDK); 1,413 kg (3,115 lb) (manual)	9,500	3.4 seconds (PDK); 3.9 seconds (manual)	318 km/h (198 mph) (PDK); 320 km/h (199 mph) (manual)
991.2 GT3 RS	2018–2019	3,996	382 kW; 513 hp (520 PS)	470 N⋅m (347 lbf⋅ft)	1,430 kg (3,153 lb)	4,880	3.2 seconds (PDK)	312 km/h (194 mph)
992.1 GT3	2021–2024	3,996	375 kW; 503 hp (510 PS)	470 N⋅m (347 lbf⋅ft)	1,435 kg (3,164 lb) (PDK); 1,418 kg (3,126 lb) (manual)		3.4 seconds (PDK); 3.9 seconds (manual)	318 km/h (198 mph) (PDK); 320 km/h (199 mph) (manual)
992.1 GT3 RS	2022–2024	3,996	386 kW; 518 hp (525 PS)	465 N⋅m (343 lbf⋅ft)	1,450 kg (3,197 lb)		3.2 seconds (PDK)	296 km/h (184 mph)
992.2 GT3	2024–present	3,996	375 kW; 503 hp (510 PS)	450 N⋅m (332 lb⋅ft)	1,479 kg (3,261 lb)		3.4 seconds (PDK); 3.9 seconds (manual)	311 km/h (193 mph)
992.2 GT3 Touring	2024–present	3,996	375 kW; 503 hp (510 PS)	450 N⋅m (332 lb⋅ft)	1,461 kg (3,221 lb)		3.4 seconds (PDK); 3.9 seconds (manual)	313 km/h (194 mph)

== Motorsport ==
=== Racing cars ===
Many different race versions of the 911 GT3 have entered competition since 1998:

=== 996 GT3 ===
==== 996 GT3 Cup (1998–2001) ====
The 996 GT3 Cup served as the basis for the 996 GT3 road car, featuring a 3.6 litre (bore×stroke: 100 mm×76.4 mm) boxer engine on based on the GT1 block rated at 265 kW (360 PS; 355 hp) at 7,200 rpm and 360 N⋅m (266 lbf⋅ft) at 6,250 rpm, with a redline of 8,000 rpm, mated to a six-speed manual transmission. For the 1999 season the engine output was increased to 272 kW (370 PS; 365 hp) and 370 N⋅m (273 lbf⋅ft) at 6,250 rpm. The fuel cell holds 64 litres of fuel and the car weighs in at 1,140 kg (2,513 lb). Slick tyres supplied by Pirelli measured 245/45-18 front to 305/645-18 rear, brake disks measured 330 mm and ABS was standard. The car can accelerate from 0-100 km/h (62 mph) in four seconds and has a top speed of 286 km/h (178 mph). For the 2001 season the GT3 Cup received modified aerodynamics including an enlarged rear wing and improved cooling.

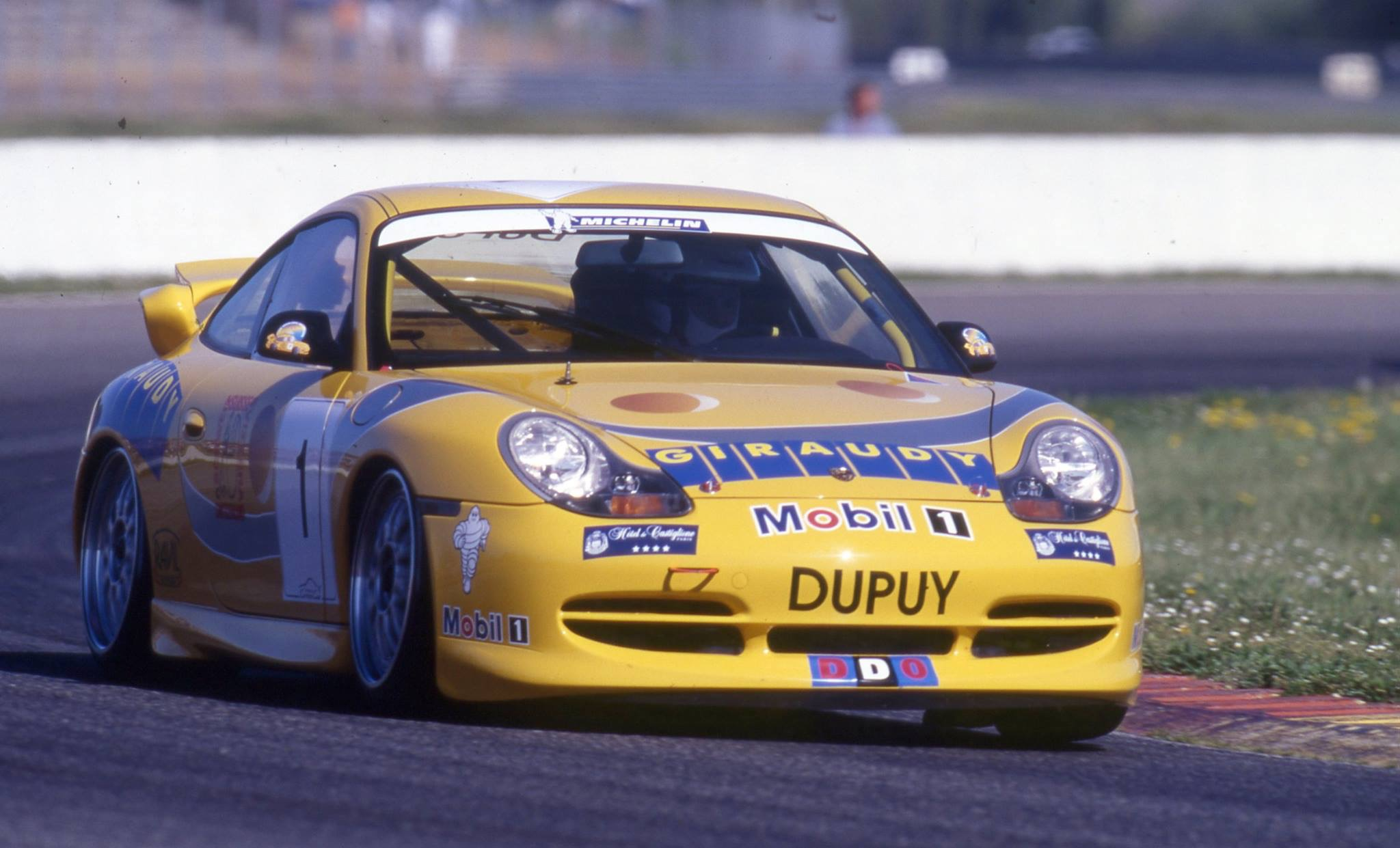
Porsche 911 GT3 Cup (996)

==== 996.2 GT3 Cup (2002–2004) ====
In 2002, the GT3 Cup received several changes, adopting facelift 996.2 features such as Turbo-style headlights. The new body significantly improves aerodynamics and cooling. Engine output was increased to 280 kW (381 PS; 375 hp) and 380 N⋅m (280 lbf⋅ft) of torque, further changes include improved transmission cooling, a lightened exhaust system and other light-weighing measures across the car. Slicks supplied by Michelin measured 24/64-18 front and 27/68-18 rear. Front brake disks increased to 350 mm in diameter, clamped by six-piston calipers. Weight remained at 1,140 kg (2,513 lb) dry.

For the 2004 season, the car received further upgrades. Engine output was increased slightly, to 287 kW (390 PS; 385 hp) at 7,200 rpm and 390 N⋅m (288 lbf⋅ft) of torque at 6,500 rpm. Gear ratios of fourth, fifth and sixth gears were shortened. A 89-litre fuel cell improves endurance racing capabilities. Changes were made to the interior to enable the use of the HANS device.

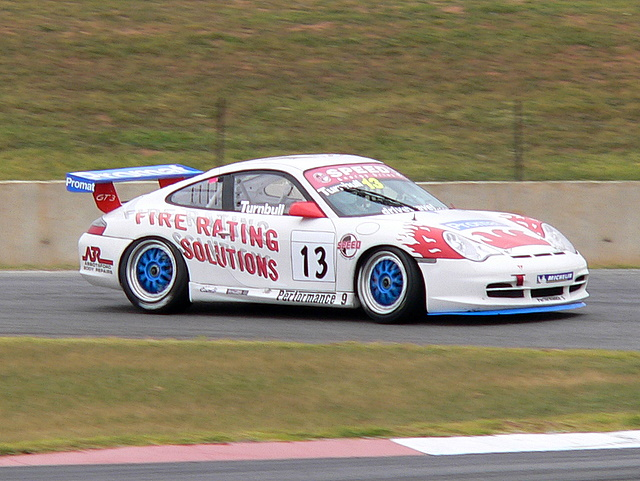
Porsche 911 GT3 Cup (996) front

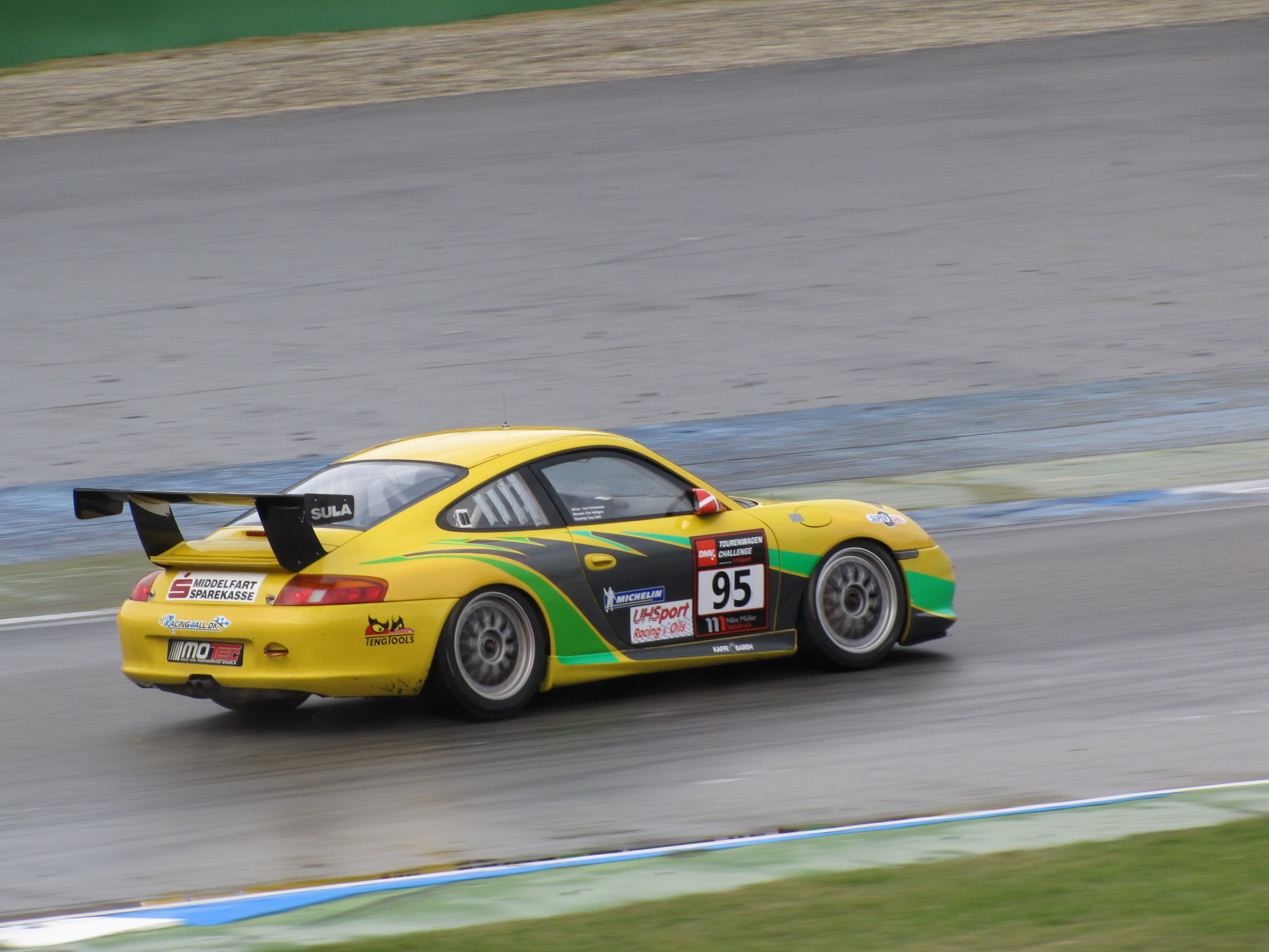
Porsche 911 GT3 Cup (996) rear

==== 996 GT3 R (1999–2001) ====
The 996 GT3 R was introduced in 1999 as a replacement for the 993 RSR. Before its introduction, it was extensively tested at Weissach and Paul Ricard. Reduction in weight over the GT3 road car was achieved by carbon fibre body panels and plexi-glass rear and side windows. The front nose section contained additional air inlets for engine and brake cooling. A steel roll cage was welded into the body and the car was fitted with an air-jack system, fire extinguisher and racing seat with safety harness.

The suspension was similar to the GT3 road car in principle, but with variable springs, adjustable shocks, anti-roll bars and spherical joints. The car could be set up precisely for each track. Large brake discs (standard specifications: 350 mm front and 330 mm rear) were fitted but with no ABS brakes because they were not permitted in Le Mans GT class.

The 3.6-litre engine (Type M96/77) developed 302 kW (411 PS; 405 hp) at 8,200rpm when fitted with a 43.1 mm air restrictor plate, thereby meeting class regulations. The engine was fitted with a Bosch Motronic 3.1 engine management system. Other engine modifications included titanium conrods and valves, a racing exhaust system, as well as a dry-sump lubrication with an oil-water heat exchanger. A 6-speed sequential manual transmission was installed. Notable wins for the GT3 R include class wins at the 1999 and 2000 24 Hours of Le Mans.

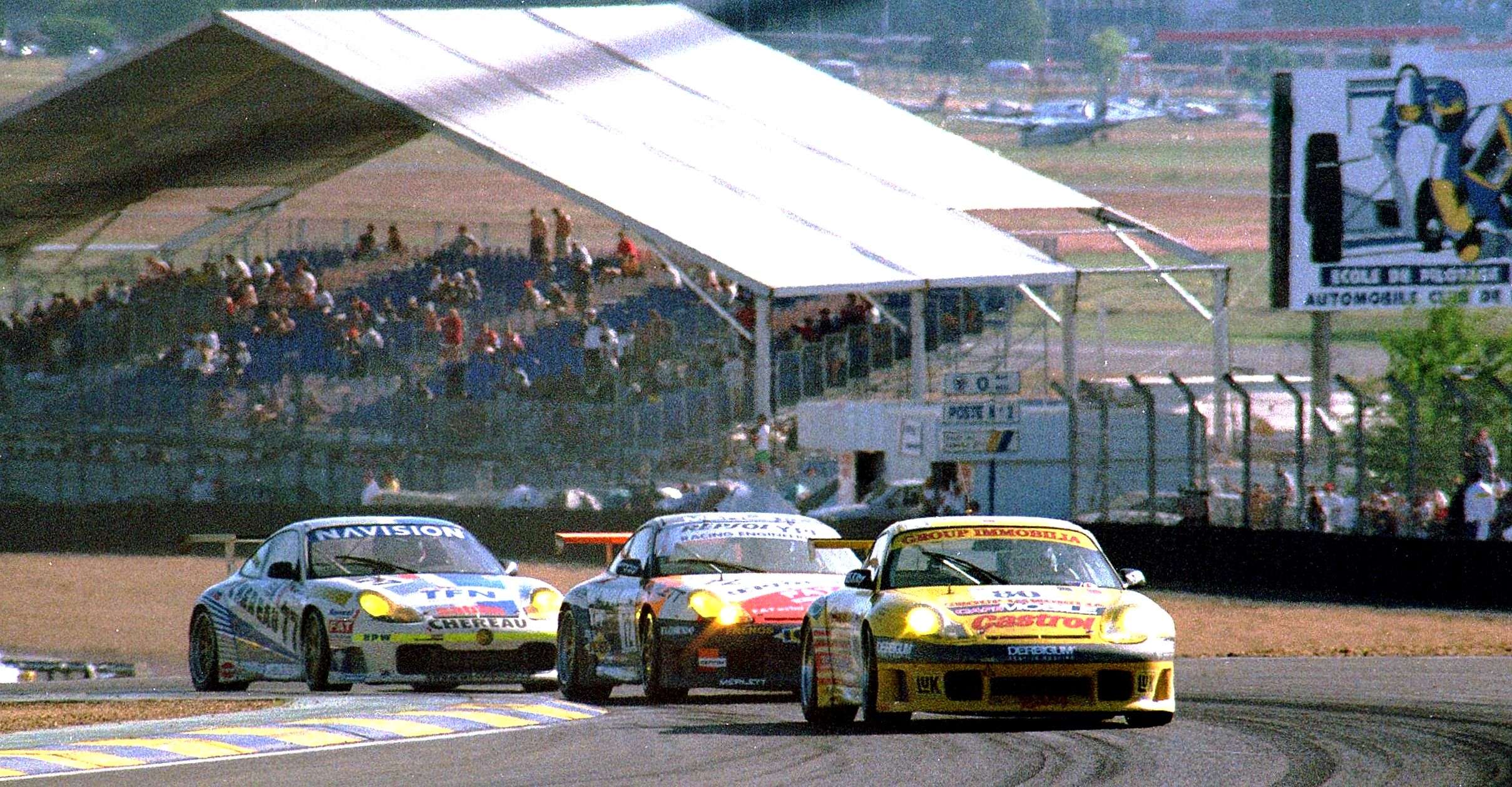
Porsche 996 GT3-R's at the 2000 24 Hours of Le Mans

==== 996 GT3 RS (2001) ====
The 2001 996 GT3 RS won the GTO Class in the 2001 British GT Championship at the hands of Parr Motorsport's Kelvin Burt and Marino Franchitti with 109 points.

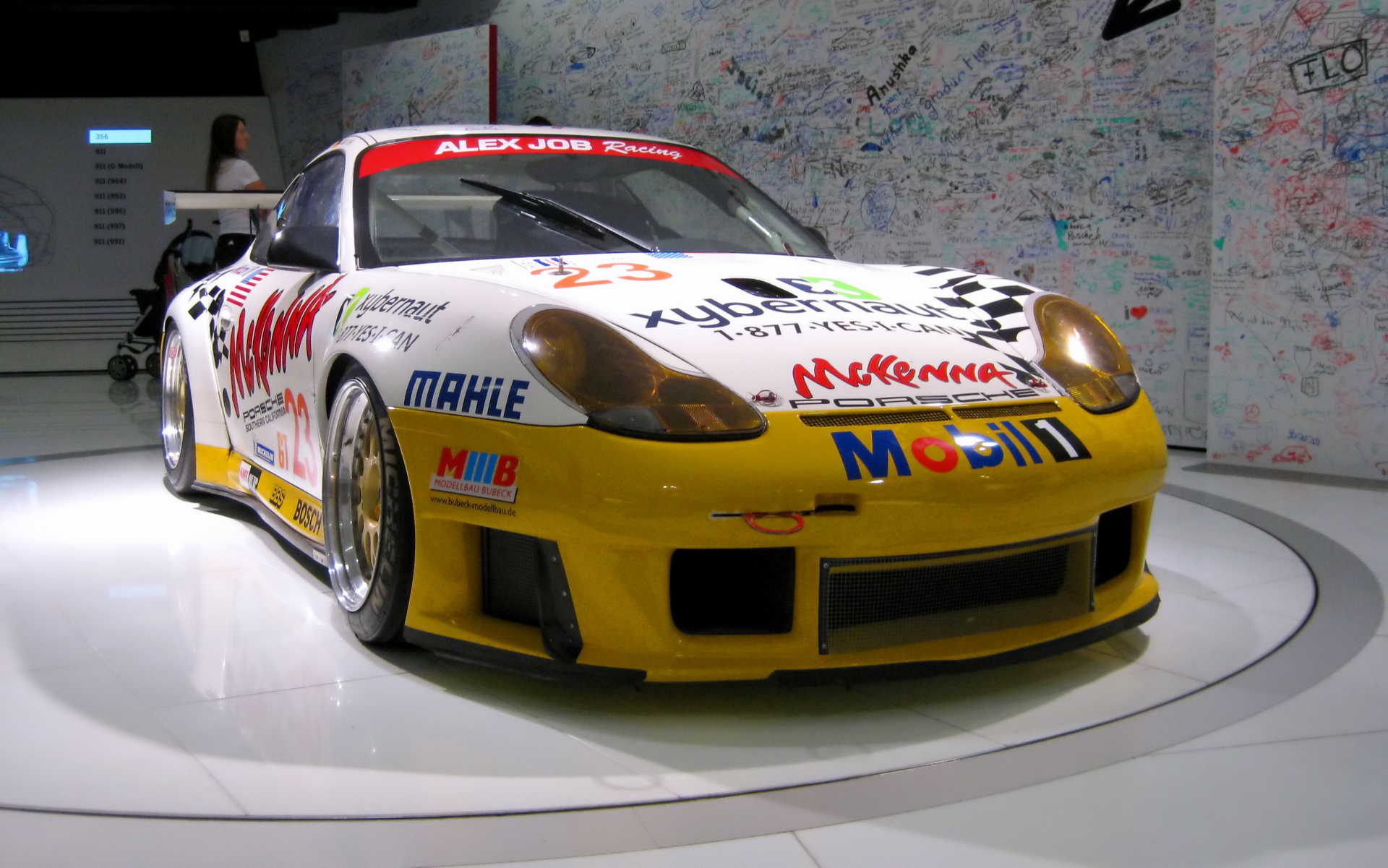
Porsche 996 GT3 RS

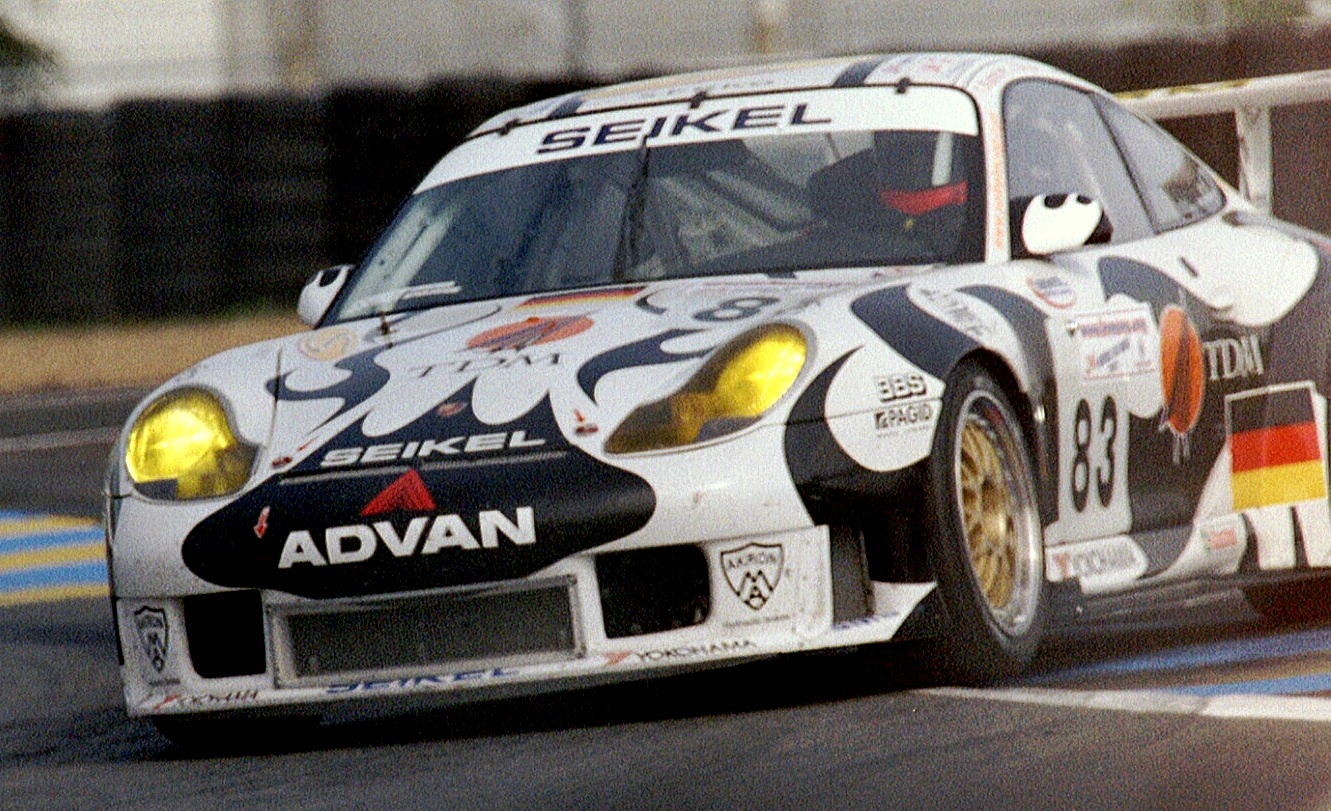
Porsche 996 GT3 RS at the 2004 24 Hours of Le Mans

==== 996 GT3 RSR (2004) ====
The 2004 Porsche 911 996 GT3 RSR was essentially an upgraded version of the motorsports oriented GT3 RS. It was the ultimate development of the 996 GT3 featuring a 331 kW (450 PS; 444 hp) 3.8-litre flat-6 engine and a 6-speed sequential manual transmission. Reduction in weight was achieved by employing carbon fibre panels. Only 37 cars were built. Accolades of the RSR include three victories in American Le Mans Series GT2 class and class wins at the 2004 and 2005 24 Hours of Le Mans.

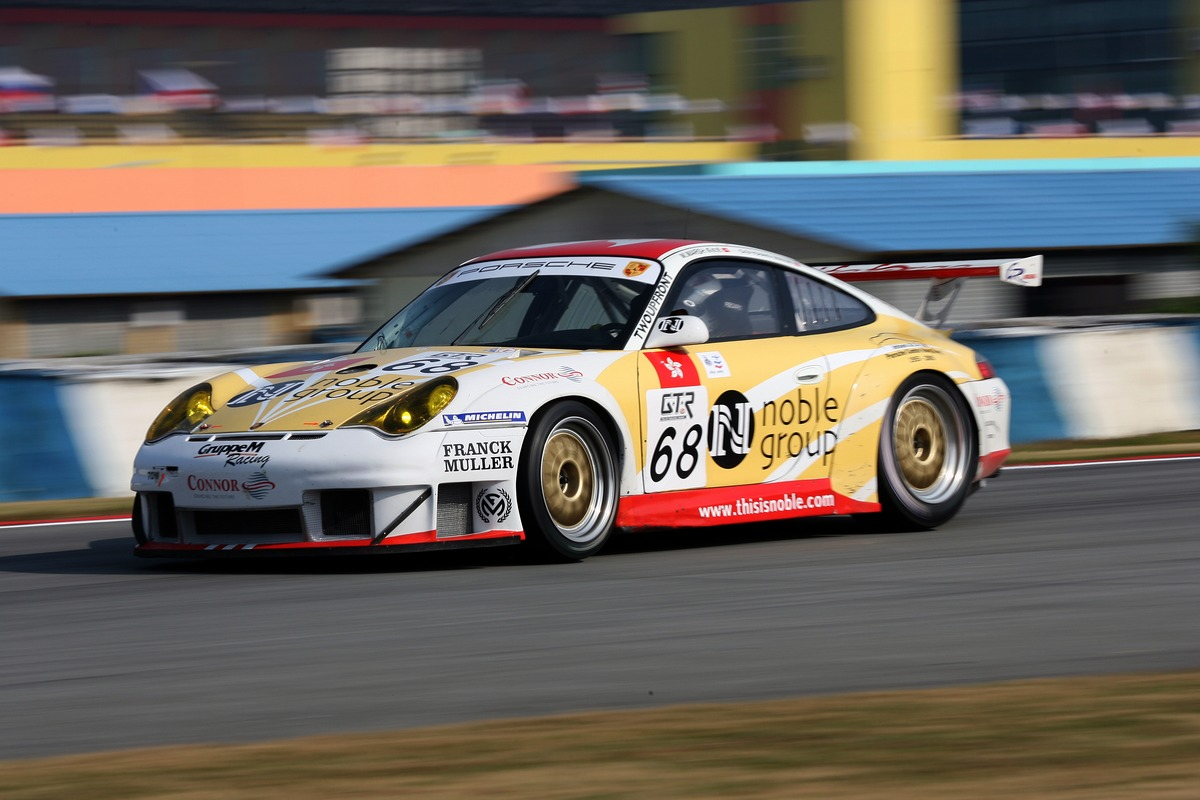
Porsche 996 GT3 RSR

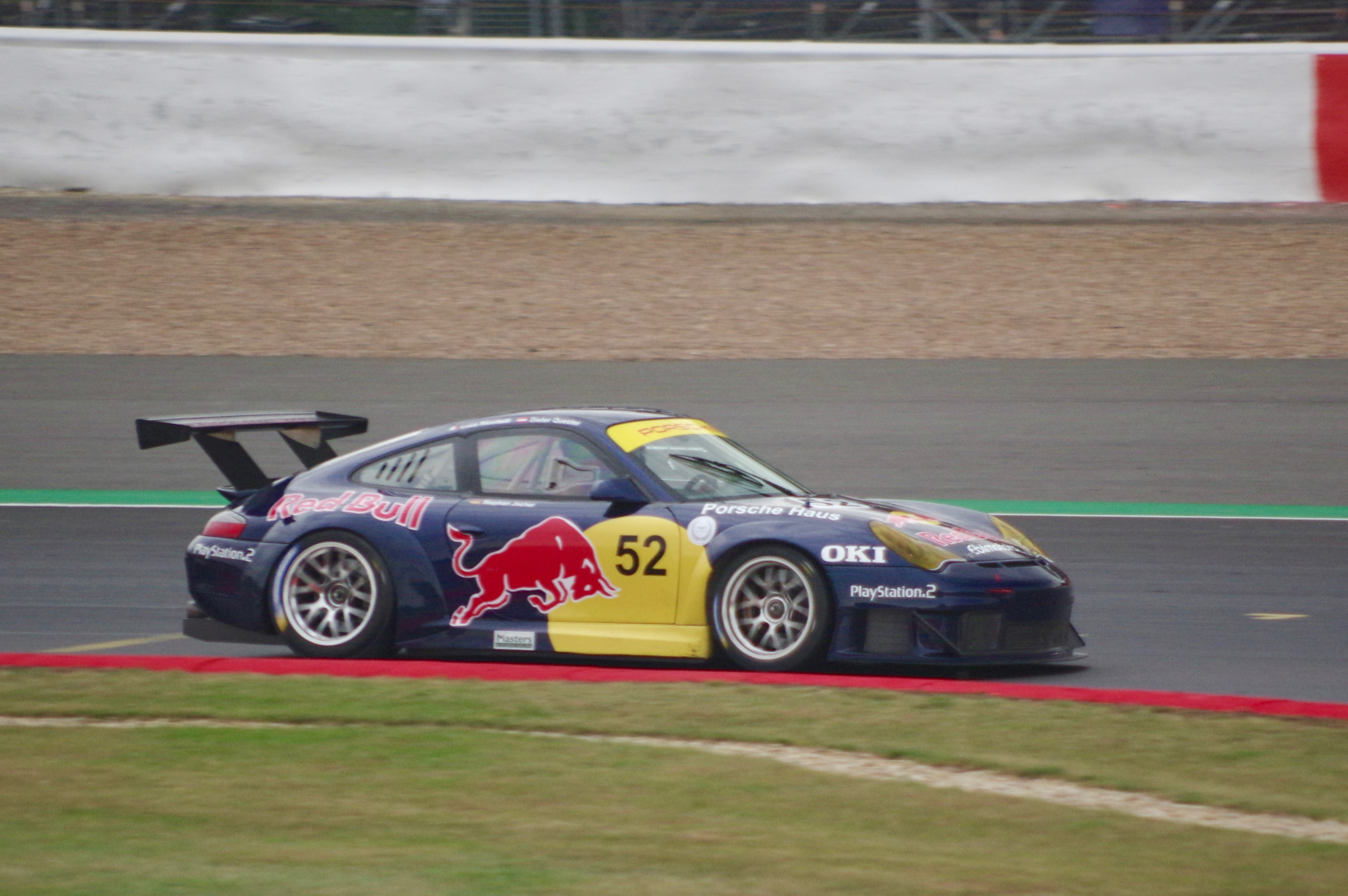
Porsche 996 GT3 RSR

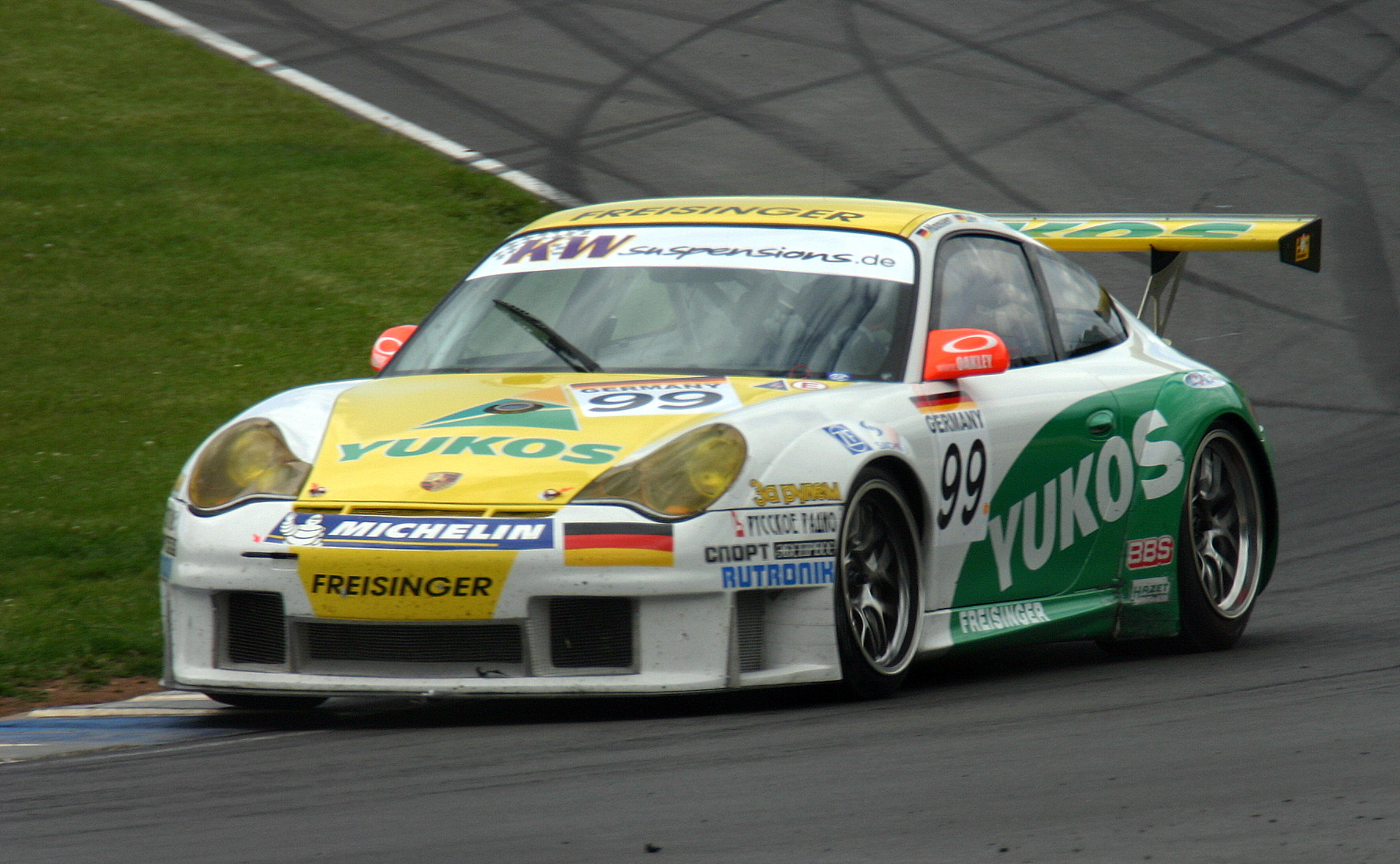
Porsche 996 GT3-RSR competing at the 2004 FIA GT Donington 500km

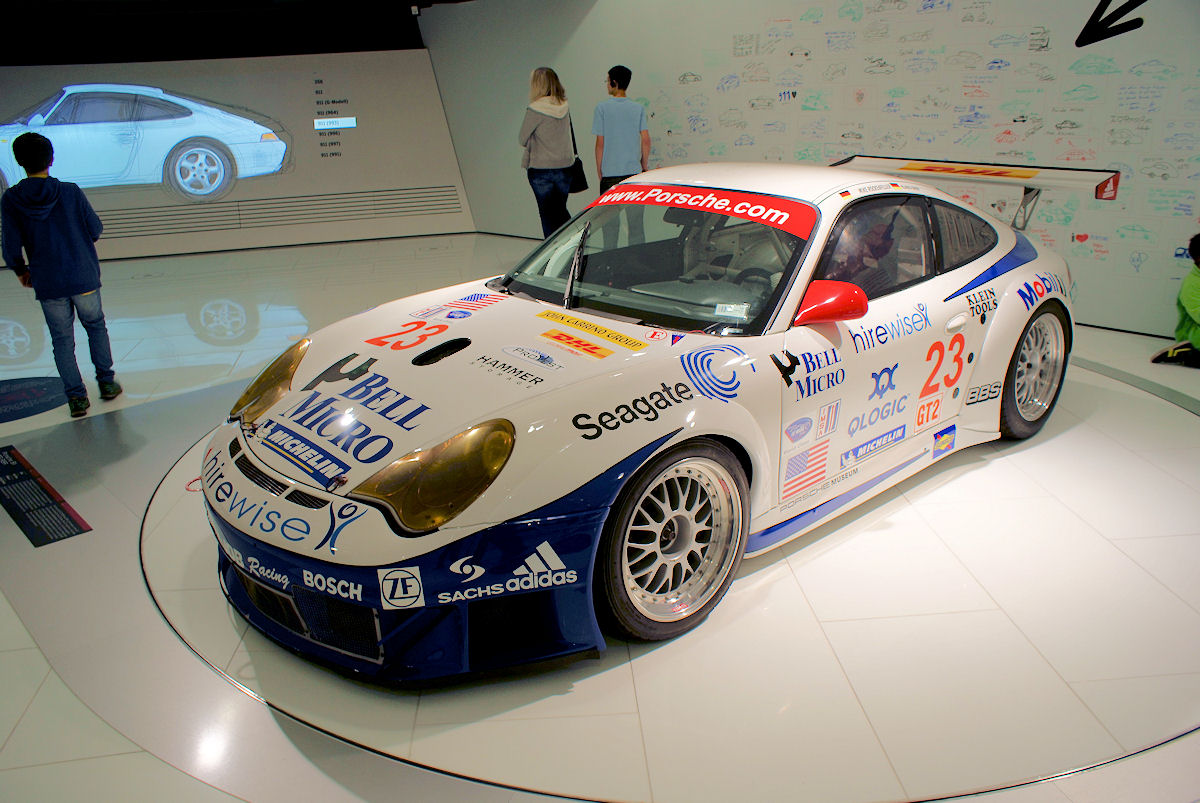
2004 Porsche 911 (996) GT3-RSR at the Porsche Museum

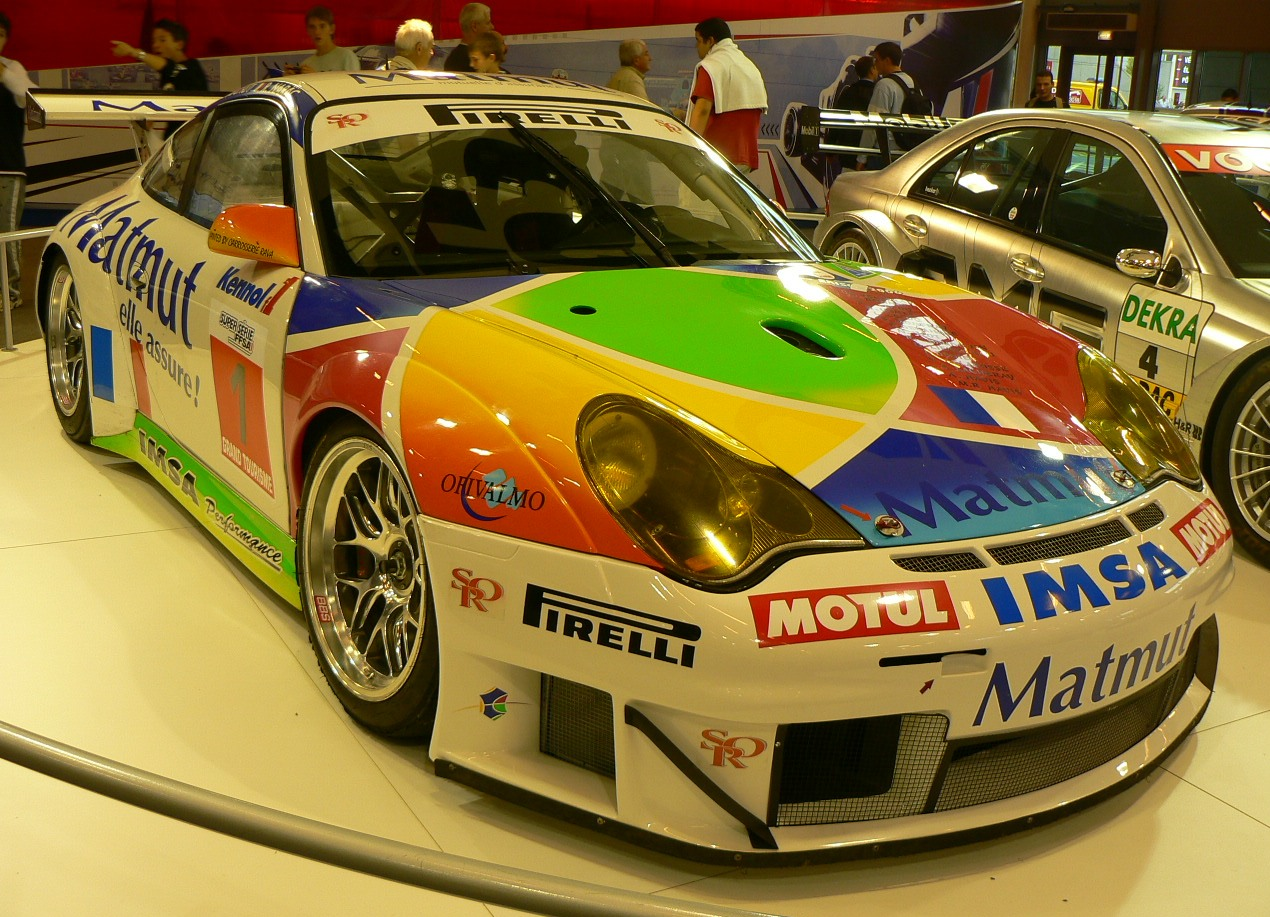
Porsche 911 GT3 RSR (996) at the 2006 Paris Motor Show

=== 997 GT3 ===
==== 997 GT3 Cup (2005–2008) ====
The 997 Cup's 3.6 litre engine is rated at 294 kW (400 PS; 394 hp) at 7,000 rpm and 400 N⋅m (295 lbf⋅ft) at 6,500 rpm and is now mated to a six-speed sequential transmission. The 997 features significantly improved aerodynamics and lightweight CFRP parts, including doors, rear body panels, engine deck lid and rear wing. Parts of the suspension are adopted from the GT3 RSR. Brake discs are 380 mm front and 350 mm in the rear in diameter and ABS with four control settings is standard.

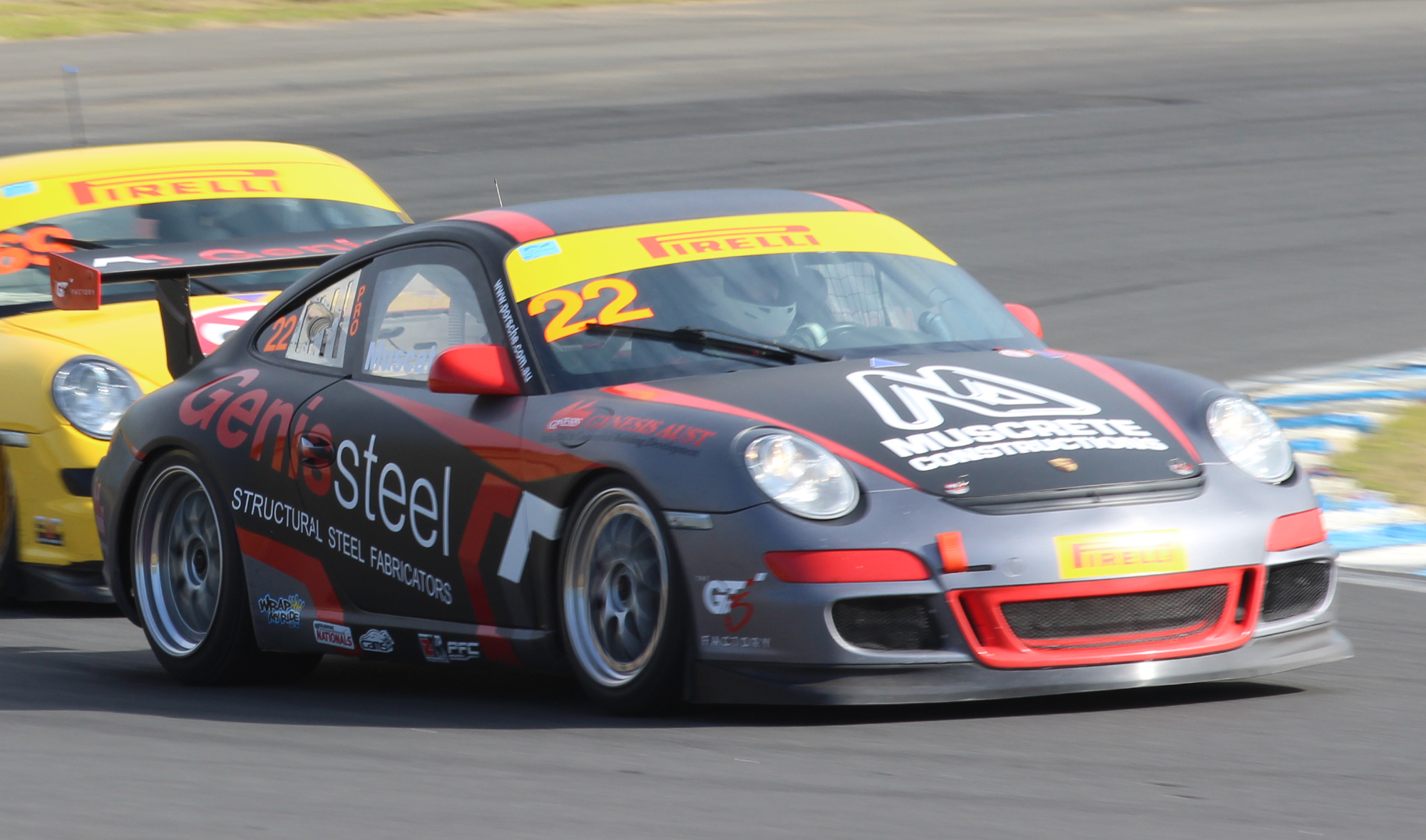
Porsche 911 GT3 Cup (997) front

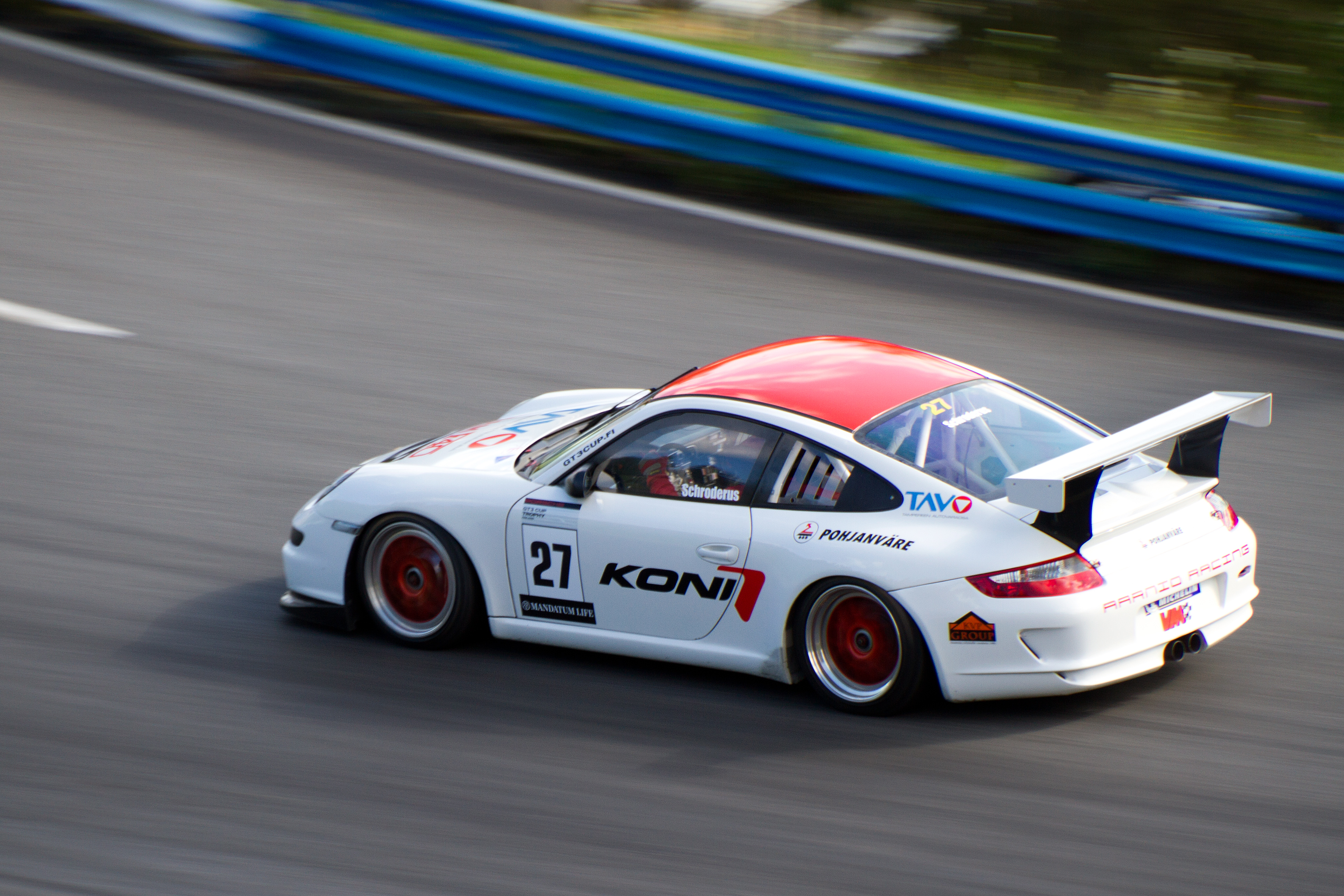
2008 Porsche 911 GT3 Cup (997) rear

==== 997 GT3 Cup S (2008–2010) ====
Homologated on basis of the GT3 RS road car instead of the GT3 and destined for international FIA GT3 customer racing. Suspension components were adopted from the GT3 RSR.

==== 997.2 GT3 Cup 3.8 (2009–2013) ====
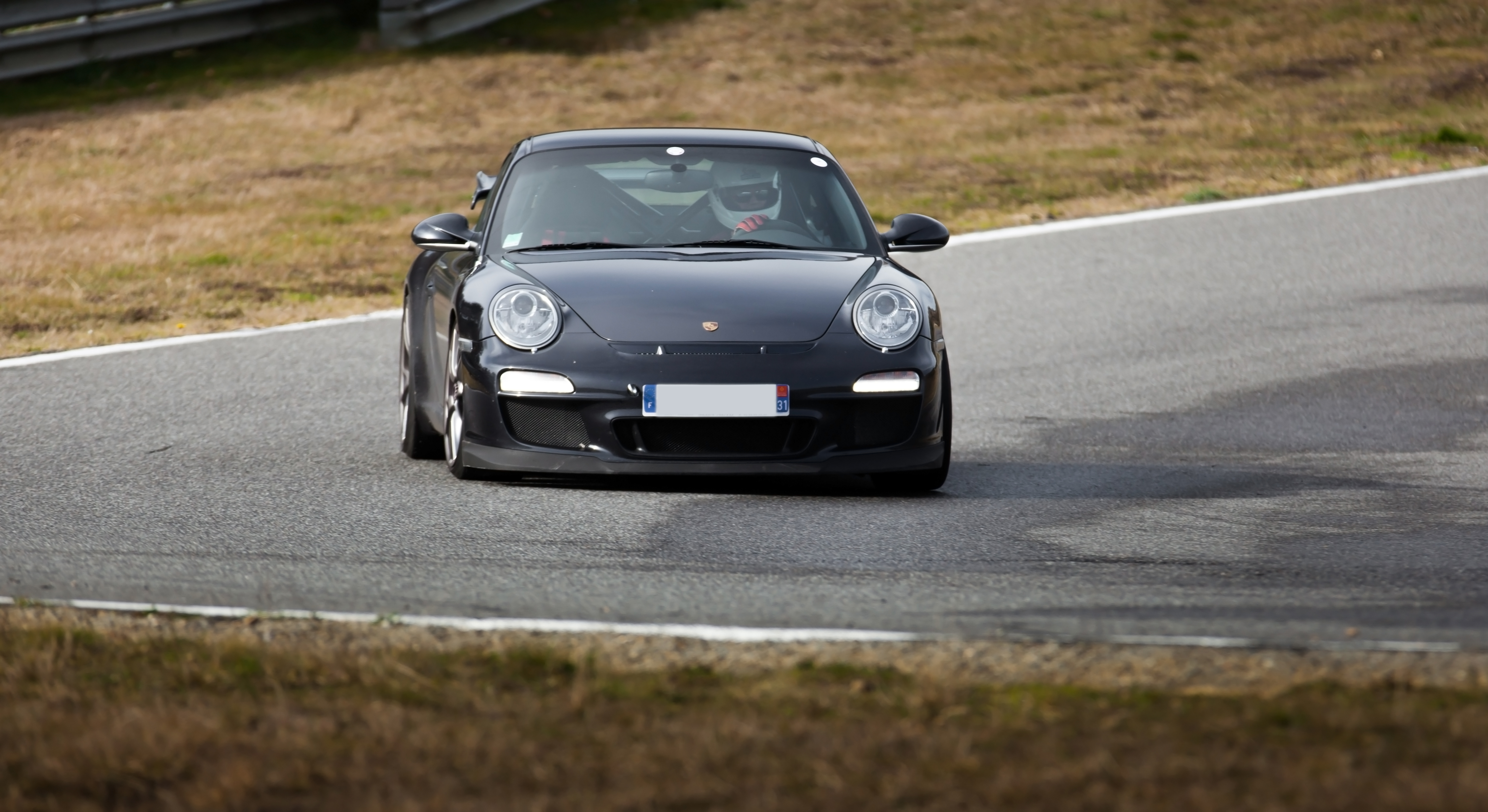
Porsche GT3 3.8 - Club ASA

Unveiled at the 2009 Frankfurt Motor Show and based on the 997.2 GT3 RS, the GT3 Cup features a new 3.8 litre engine with an output of 331 kW (450 PS; 444 hp) at 7,500 rpm and an 8,500 rpm redline. Further changes include a 44 mm (1.7 in) wider rear body, 15 mm (0.59 in) lower front spoiler lip, an enlarged rear wing adopted from 911 GT3 Cup S measuring 1.70 m (67 in), new LED tail lights and a modified racing exhaust system. 9.5Jx18 front alloy wheels with 24/64-18 Michelin racing tyres and 12Jx18 alloy wheels with 27/68-18 tyres, additional Unibal joints on the track control arms and front and rear sword-shaped anti-roll bars with seven position settings each, additional vent in the upper part of the front lid, steering wheel mounted Info Display with 6 switches. The car weighs in at 1,160 kg (2,557 lb).

Deliveries began in the same year. The base MSRP of the European model was €149,850 (before tax).

==== 997 GT3 RSR (2006–2012) ====
First introduced in 2006, the 997 RSR was built to comply with the Automobile Club de l’Ouest, the FIA-GT and IMSA as well as VLN regulations. Based on the 997 GT3, the RSR features a 3.8-litre flat-6 engine with two 30.3 mm air restrictors as compared to the 3.6-litre engine of its predecessor with 29 mm restrictors. The increase in displacement was achieved through the enlargement of the bore to 102.7 mm with the unchanged stroke of 76.4 mm. With the mandatory air restrictors, the engine is rated at 335 kW (455 PS; 449 hp) at 8,500 rpm and 435 N⋅m (321 lb⋅ft) of torque. The engine has a red-line of 9,000 rpm due to the increase in capacity and the corresponding reprogramming of the electronics. The new positioning of the mid-front radiator and the use of side radiators – shared with the Carrera GT – contribute to the thermal health of the engine. The 997 RSR used the 6-speed sequential manual transmission of 996 RSR for the 2006 season. For the 2007 season, a new 6-speed sequential manual transmission was added which was shared with the RS Spyder.

The bodyshell with the welded-in safety cage is ten percent stiffer than the 996 RSR. Distinctive wheel arches widen the body by 50 mm (2 in) on each side. The relocation of the supplementary oil tank, power steering components and battery to the front improve weight distribution. The front and rear lids, the front mudguards, the rear section, the doors as well as the front and rear panelling and wing are made of carbon fibre. Polycarbonate rear and side windows further aid in weight reduction.

The newly developed aerodynamic package improves aerodynamic efficiency by a total of around seven percent over the 996 RSR. In compliance with the FIA and A.C.O. regulations the new GT3 RSR features a flat underbody.

The RSR featured ZF-Sachs shock absorbers which have Through-Rod-System with considerably lower chamber pressure and hence generate less friction than conventional dampers. As a result, they offer a significantly improved response characteristic. The improved axles featured new anti-roll-bars, an adjustable upper link and an optimised lower link.

In 2007 Porsche added front air louvers that channel air into the radiators and exit through the bonnet. For 2011 Porsche added splitters to the front and increased the tyre diameter to cope with the understeer problem engine power output was also increased to 338 kW (460 PS; 453 hp).

The 997 GT3 RSR has scored many class victories around the world, including first-place finishes at the 2011 and 2013 Petit Le Mans. The 997 GT3 RSR set a Nürburgring Nordschleife lap time record for non-turbocharged cars at 7:07 while driven by Sabine Schmitz.

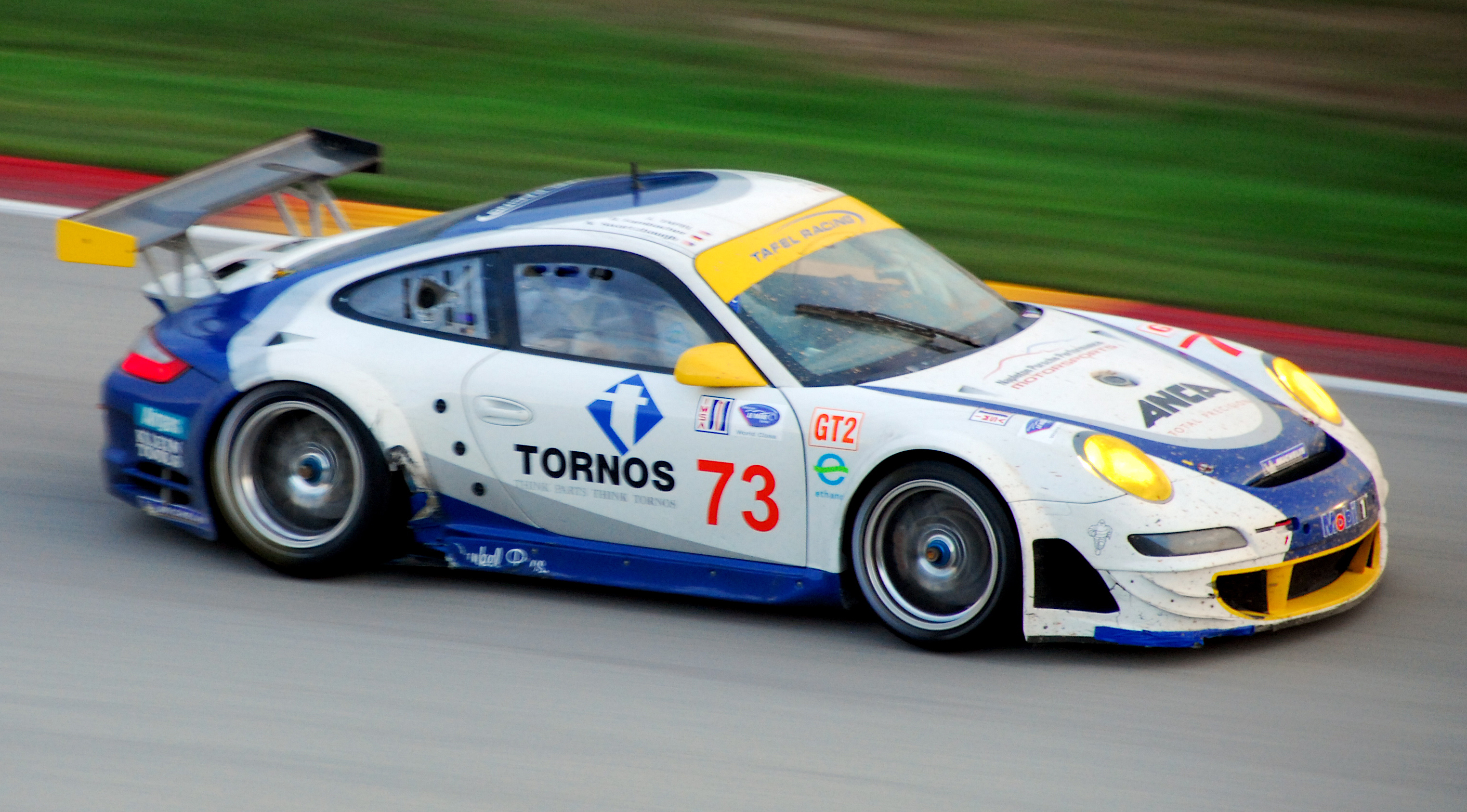
2007 Porsche 911 GT3 RSR (997)

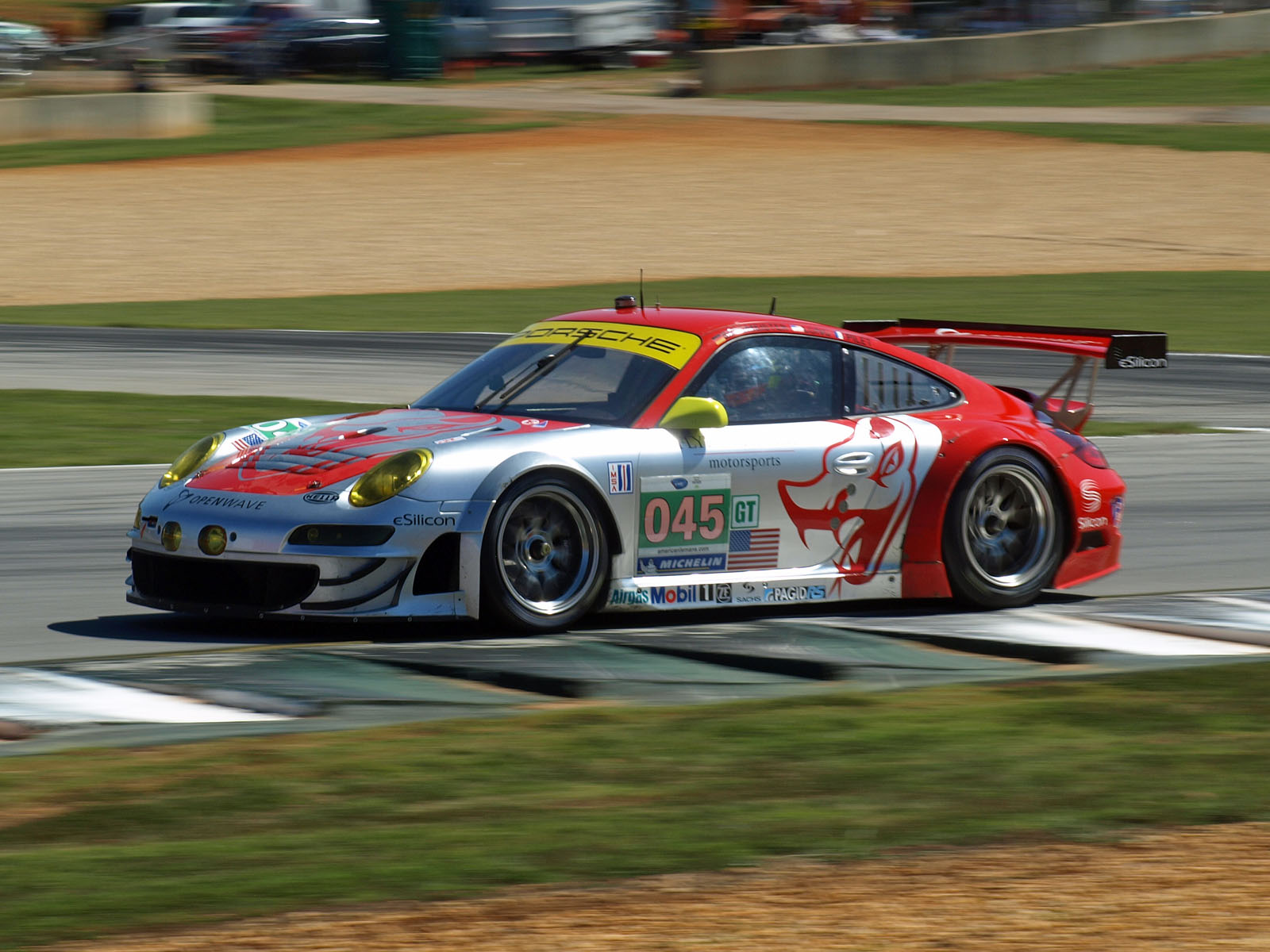
2011 Porsche 911 GT3 RSR (997)

==== 997 GT3 R (2010–2015) ====
Replacing the GT3 Cup S and built from the ground up for FIA GT3 regulations the GT3 R features a 4.0 litre, 368 kW (500 PS; 493 hp) boxer engine (Type M97/79), a six-speed sequential transmission, a throttle-blip function, ABS and traction control. Base MSRP was 279,000 Euro (excl. taxes).

For 2013 Porsche significantly modified the vehicle, changed the aerodynamics and increased the track, wheelbase and tyre width by several centimetres. An Evo conversion kit was offered to customers for 45,500 Euro (excl. taxes).

==== 997 GT3 R Hybrid (2010–2011) ====
The 997 GT3 R Hybrid made its debut at the 2010 Geneva Motor Show. The hybrid technology featured in the car was developed by the Williams F1 Team and is based on their F1 kinetic energy recovery system (KERS) which they did not race in 2009. Unlike other KERS that were developed for F1, the Williams system is based on using kinetic energy stored in a flywheel rather than batteries. The GT3-R has two electric motors, both developing a total output of at least 163 kW (222 PS; 219 hp), driving the front wheels to supplement the 373 kW (507 PS; 500 hp) 4.0-litre flat-six engine at the rear. The car was entered at the 2010 24 Hours Nürburgring. As part of the buildup to the 24 hour race the GT3 Hybrid made its racing debut at the VLN 4 hour endurance 57th ADAC Westfalenfahrt at Nürburgring on 27 March 2010. On 28 May 2011, it won its first VLN race. At the 2011 24 Hours of Nurburgring, weight/restrictor penalties as well as technical difficulties prevented the R Hybrid from climbing higher than 28th place. The car also ran as an unclassified car at the 2011 American Le Mans Series at Monterey event; despite starting from last place, it finished ahead of all the other GT cars and also performed the fastest GT lap of the race.

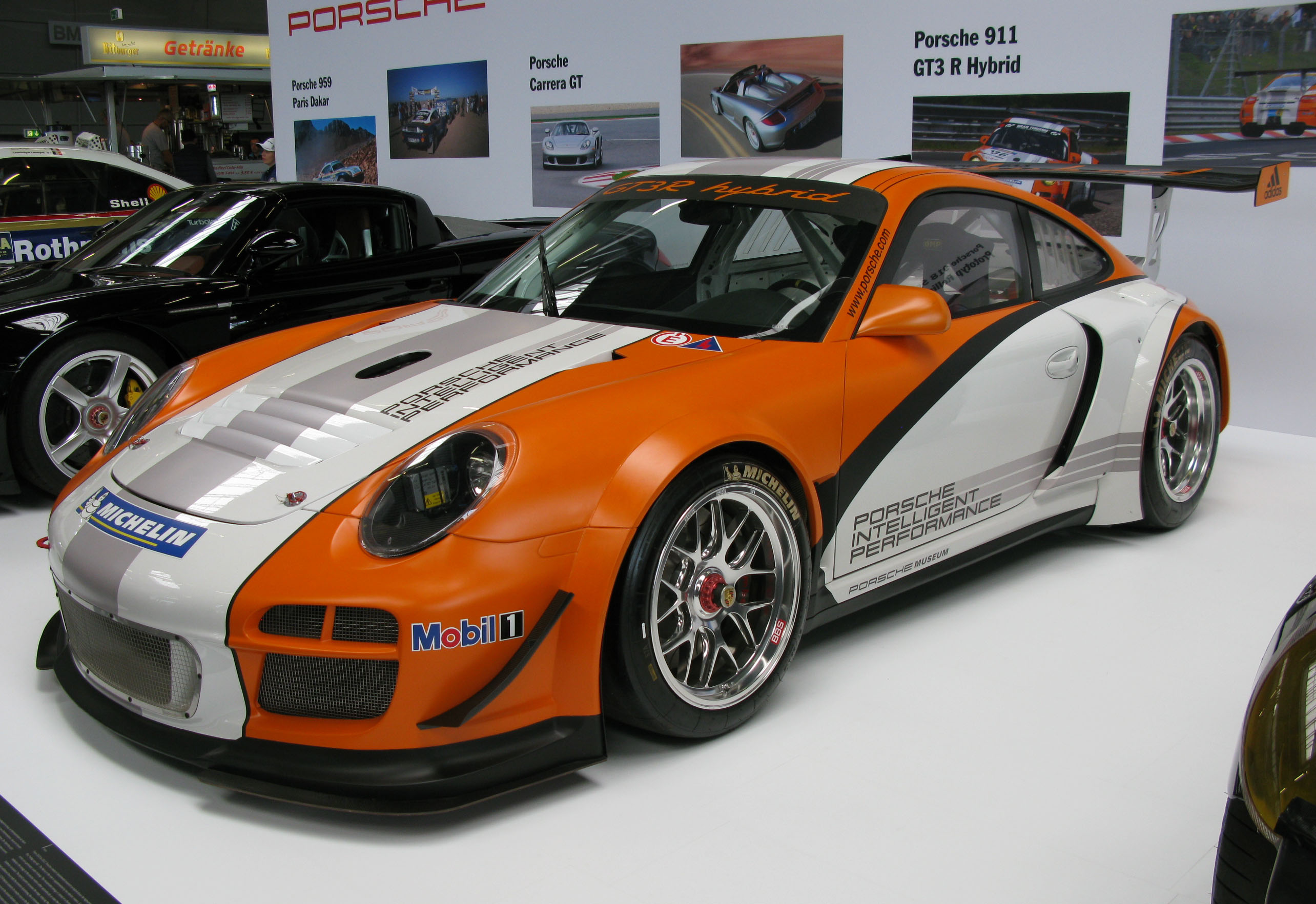
2010 Porsche 911 GT3 R Hybrid (997)

=== 991 GT3 ===
==== 991 GT3 Cup (2013–2017) ====
Porsche introduced the 991 GT3 Cup for the 2013 Porsche Supercup season, based on the 991 GT3. Like the 991 GT3 road car, its improvements over the 997 model include revised aerodynamics, an improved rollcage, new wheels and a revised chassis. The direct-injection 3.8-litre flat six is rated at 338 kW (453 hp) at 8500 rpm and drives the rear wheels through a mechanical limited slip differential. The transmission includes a paddle-shift, race-bred, pneumatically activated six speed developed specifically for the track. It uses lightweight materials in its construction, and a stripped-out cabin complete with a full roll cage, racing seat and all the safety gear required for competition, weighing 1,175 kg (2,590 lb).

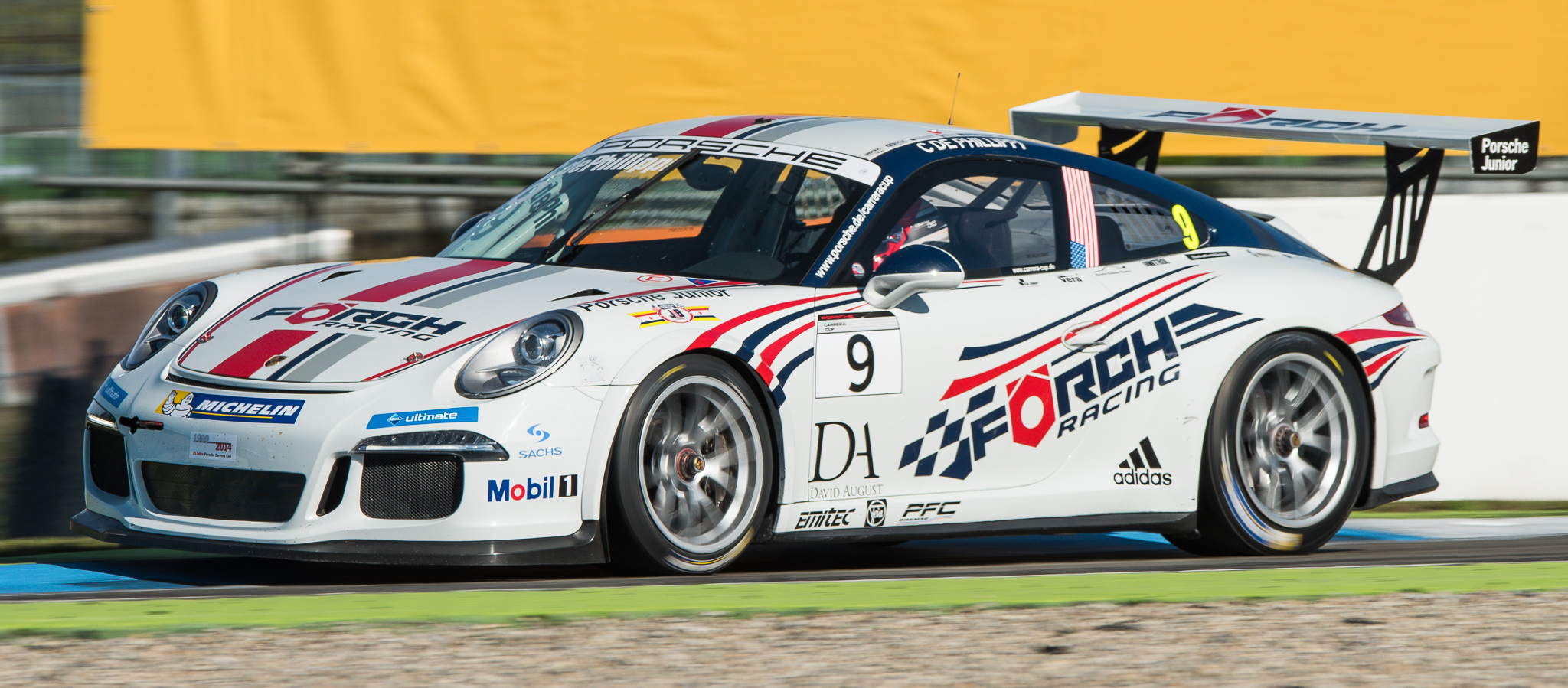
2014 Porsche 911 GT3 Cup (991)

==== 991.2 GT3 Cup (2017–2020) ====
Unveiled at the 2016 Paris Motor Show, the 2017 911 GT3 Cup is based on the 991.2 911 GT3. Improvements on the previous model include a larger 4.0-litre flat-six boxer engine rated at 357 kW (485 PS; 479 hp), improved aerodynamics and an enlarged escape-hatch in the roof. The GT3 Cup is priced at 189,900 Euro excluding taxes.

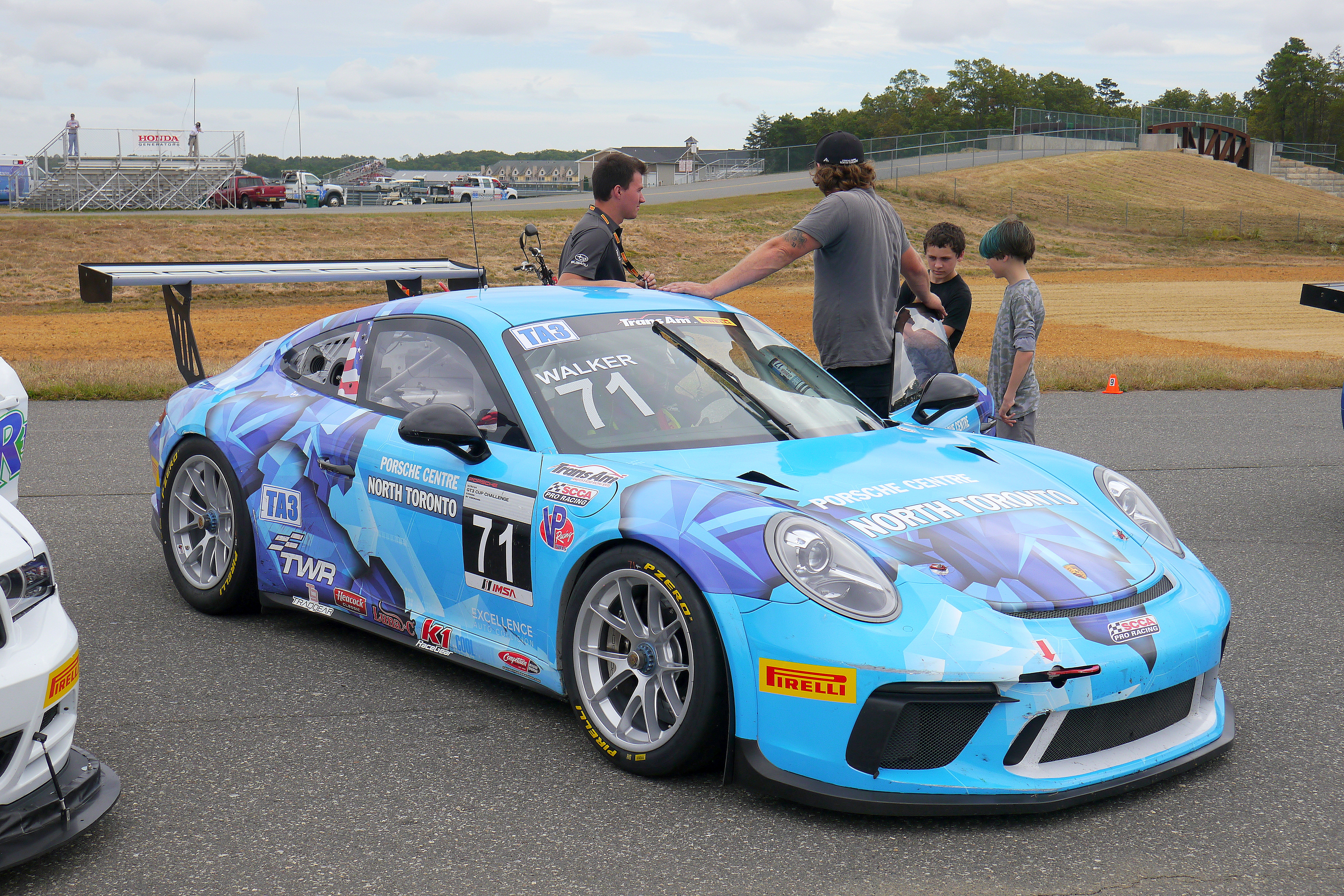
2017 Porsche 911 GT3 Cup (991.2)

==== 991 GT America (2014) ====
Porsche also announced a variant of the 991 GT3 Cup car for the United SportsCar Championship known as the 911 GT America. The car is homologated exclusively for the Grand-Touring Daytona category of the series. Upgrades over the regular Cup car include improved aerodynamics, a bigger 4.0 L flat-six engine, a new gearbox, a different safety cell, new brakes and reliability upgrades for endurance racing.

==== 991 RSR (2013–2017) ====
In 2013, Porsche introduced the newest version of the RSR based on the 991 model for the LM GTE category. Because the 991 GT3 was not in production at the time of the announcement, Porsche was forced to homologate it based on the 911 Carrera model. The 991 RSR includes revised aerodynamics, a lighter gearbox and a new, lower suspension. For the 2013 season, Porsche retained the Mezger engine of the 997 GT3 RSR model (M97/82). Manthey Racing was chosen to run the cars in the FIA World Endurance Championship; the team achieved its best success at the 2013 24 Hours of Le Mans where the 991 RSR finished 1–2 in the GT class.

For 2014, Porsche announced that it partnered with CORE Autosport to run two Porsche 911 RSRs in the United SportsCar Championship (under the Porsche North America team name) while AKB GT Raceline has announced that they would run a pair of 911 RSRs in the series. Team Falken Tire also announced that it would be running a 911 RSR from Sebring onwards. Manthey Racing will continue to run two 911 RSRs in the WEC.

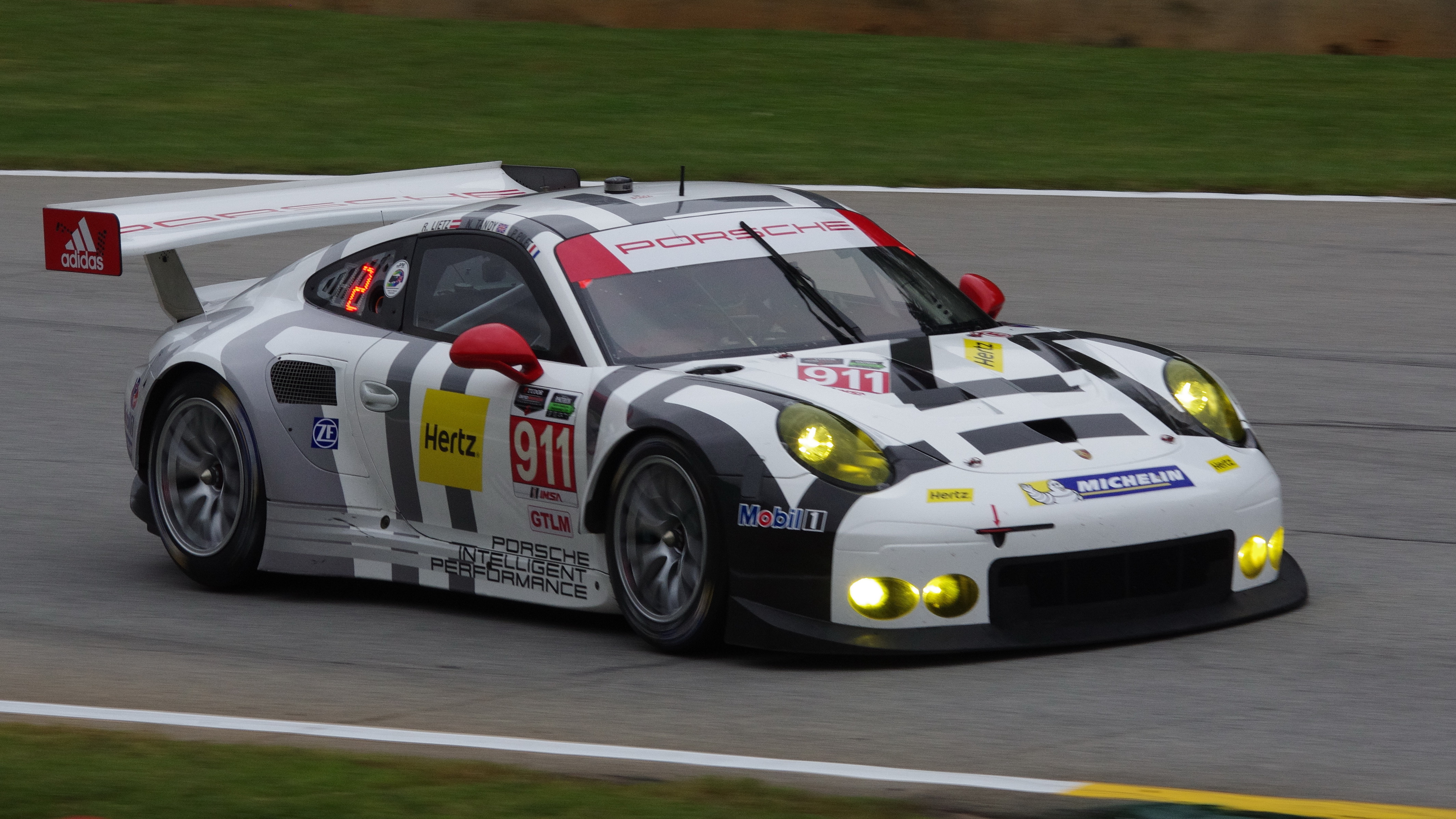
2015 Petit Le Mans winning 2015 Porsche 911 RSR (991)

==== 991 RSR (2017–2019) ====
In November 2016, Porsche introduced the new version of the 911 RSR for the LM GTE category. The car has a rear mid-engined design, powered by a 4.0-litre flat-six boxer engine, rated at 375 kW (510 PS; 503 hp) depending on series air restrictor. Other new features include a new transmission, a new direct fuel injection, a new aerodynamic pack including a swan-neck wing and a larger rear diffuser, quick-change body panels and double-wishbone suspension with quick-change shim-system all around, Bertrandt-developed LED lights first developed for the 919 Hybrid and new cockpit with fixed seat, movable pedal box, multi-function steering wheel with integrated display, a rear-view camera and collision avoidance system. The new RSR made its competition debut at the 2017 24 Hours of Daytona.

At the 2018 24 Hours of Le Mans the Manthey Racing-entered Porsche GT Team 911 RSR #92 and #91 finished 1–2 in the LM GTE Pro class respectively. Both #92 and #91 carried a special livery marking the 70th anniversary of the marque with the liveries being from past racing cars built by Porsche. The #92 carries the "Pink Pig" livery, homage to the 917/20 which used the same livery, and the #91 carries the iconic Rothmans-inspired livery from the 80s 956 and the 962. Dempsey-Proton Racing-entered 911 RSR #77 won LM GTE Am.

At the 2019 24 Hours of Le Mans the Manthey Racing-entered Porsche GT Team 911 RSR #91 finished second in the LM GTE Pro class and CORE-entered Porsche GT Team 911 RSR #93 finished third. Team Project 1-entered 911 RSR #56 won LM GTE Am.

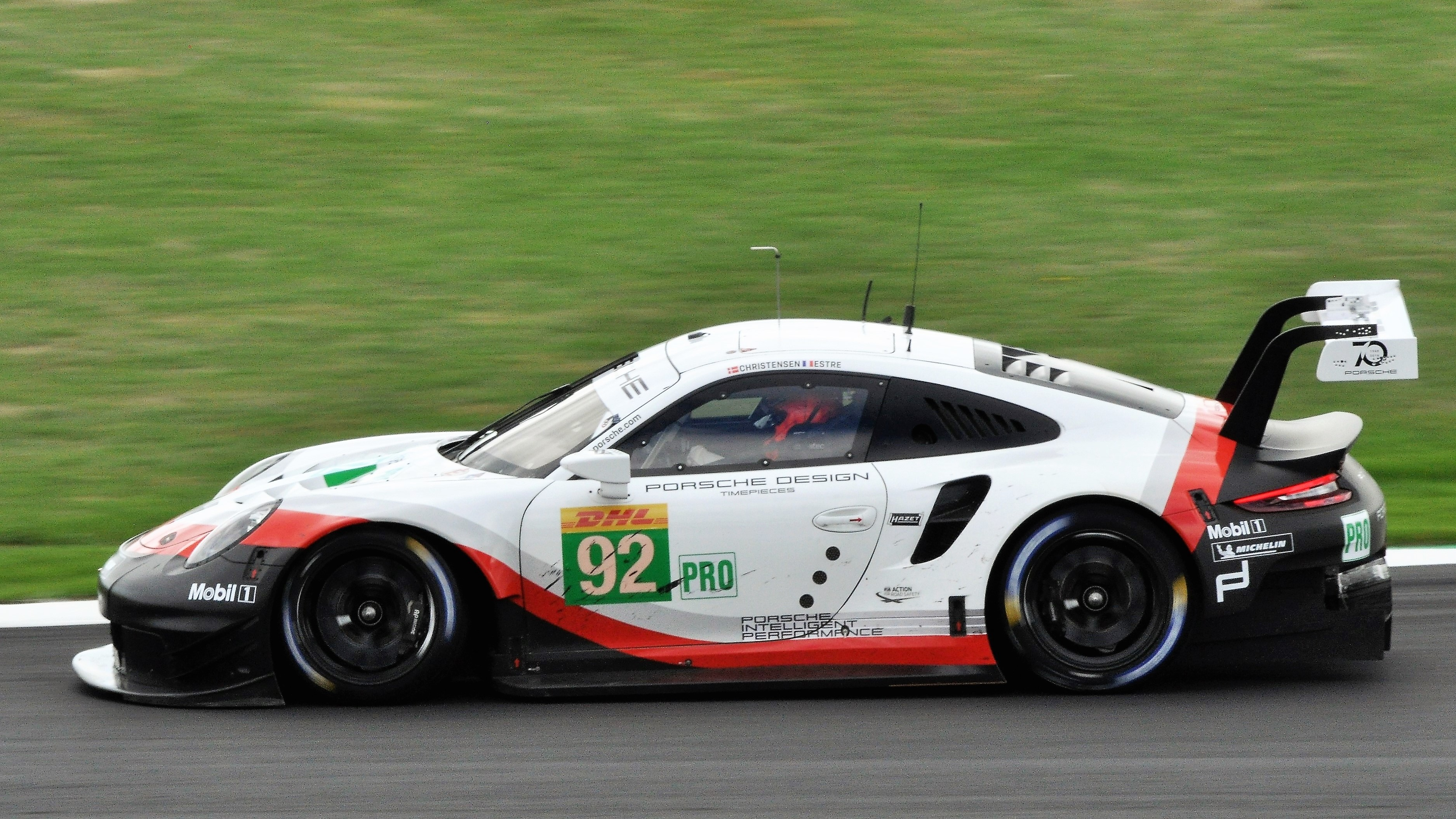
2017 Porsche 911 RSR (991)

==== 991 RSR (2019–2023) ====
In July 2019, Porsche introduced the new version of the 911 RSR for the LM GTE category at the Goodwood Festival of Speed. It is an evolution of the 991 RSR (2017), and 95% of the car is new. The engine has larger displacement, 4,194 cc (4.2 L). A more rigid sequential manual constant-mesh gearbox allows for faster shifts. The two exhaust pipes now exit on each side in front of the rear wheels, making space for an optimised diffuser. Aerodynamic efficiency is claimed to have been improved significantly. The car retains safety features such as a removable roof hatch and a rigidly mounted seat with movable pedal-box from the predecessor model along with additional impact protection elements.

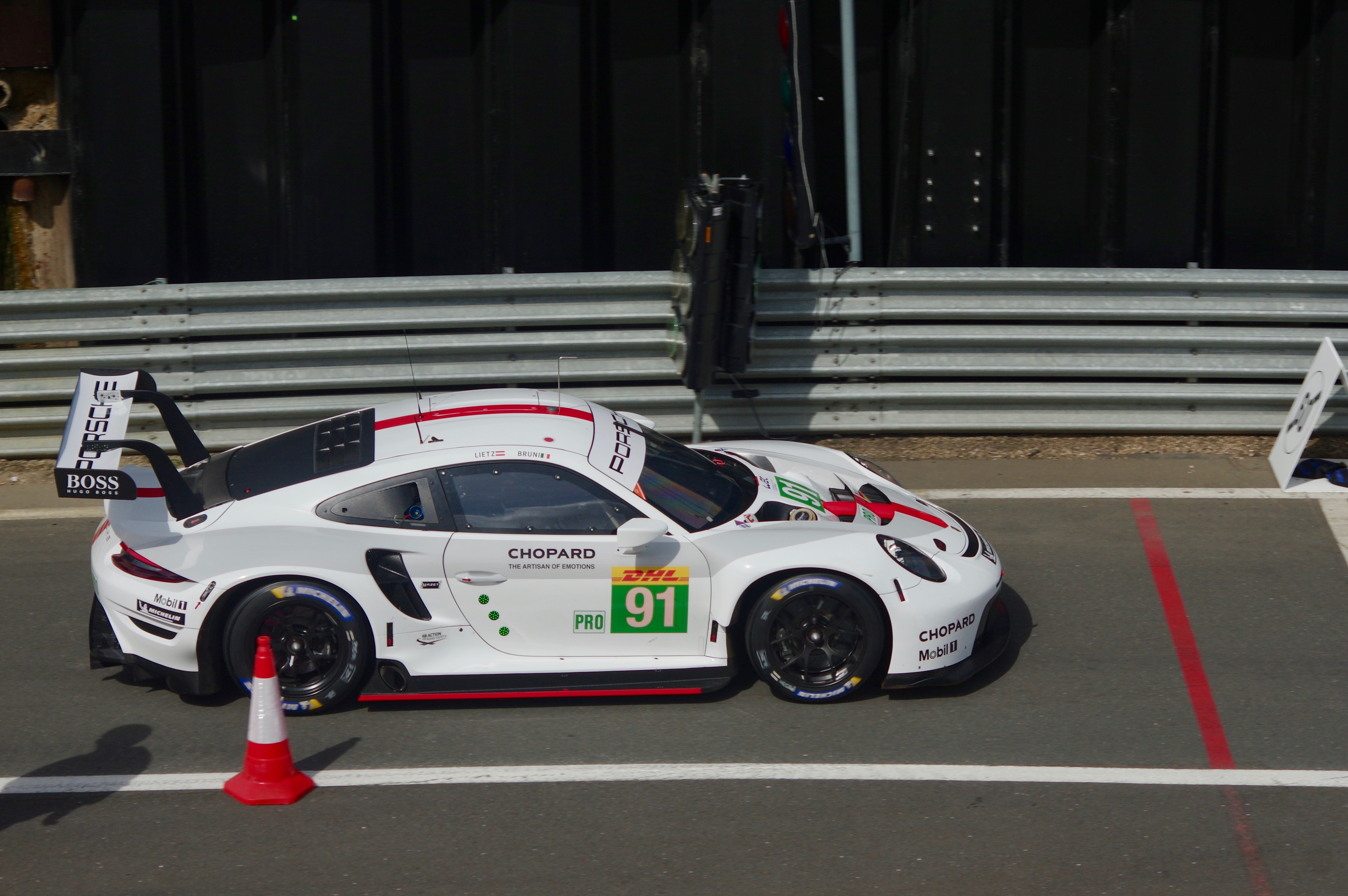
2019 Porsche 911 RSR (991) with side exhausts

==== 991 GT3 R (2016–2019) ====
In May 2015, Porsche announced the 991 GT3 R for Group GT3. The car is homologated based on the 991 GT3 RS road car, and uses the production car's 4.0-litre flat-six rated at around 373 kW (507 PS; 500 hp), running through a six-speed paddle-shift sequential gearbox. The GT3 R features a double-bubble roof, and a wheelbase which had been lengthened by 8.3 cm. Engineers also "significantly optimised" the centre of gravity position versus the old R, using carbon-fibre composite material (CFRP) for the roof, front cover and fairing, wheel arches, doors, side and tail sections as well as the rear cover. All windows – and for the first time ever, the windscreen – are made from polycarbonate to cut weight. Race car essentials such as an integrated (welded) roll cage according to FIA Appendix J, safety fuel cell (approximately 120 litres, with fuel cut off safety valve in accordance with FIA regulations), removable roof escape hatch and an air jack system are present. The weight is 1,220 kg (2,690 lb).

The GT3 R has adopted the concept of the central radiator from the 911 RSR. By eliminating the side radiators, the position of the centre of gravity is improved, the radiator is better protected against collision damage, and the venting of hot air through louvres in the front cover is enhanced. The two-metre wide rear wing lends aerodynamic balance and distinctive wheel arch air vents on the front fairings increase downforce at the front axle. The GT3 R's front MacPherson strut suspension and multi-link rear suspension are adjustable in height, camber and toe, and there are adjustable anti-roll bar blades at both ends. All wheel hubs come with centre-lock wheel nuts. There are two separate brake circuits for the front and rear axles; driver adjustable via a brake balance bar system. The front brakes consist of six-piston aluminium monobloc calipers gripping 380 mm discs; the rears are four-piston items with 372 mm discs.

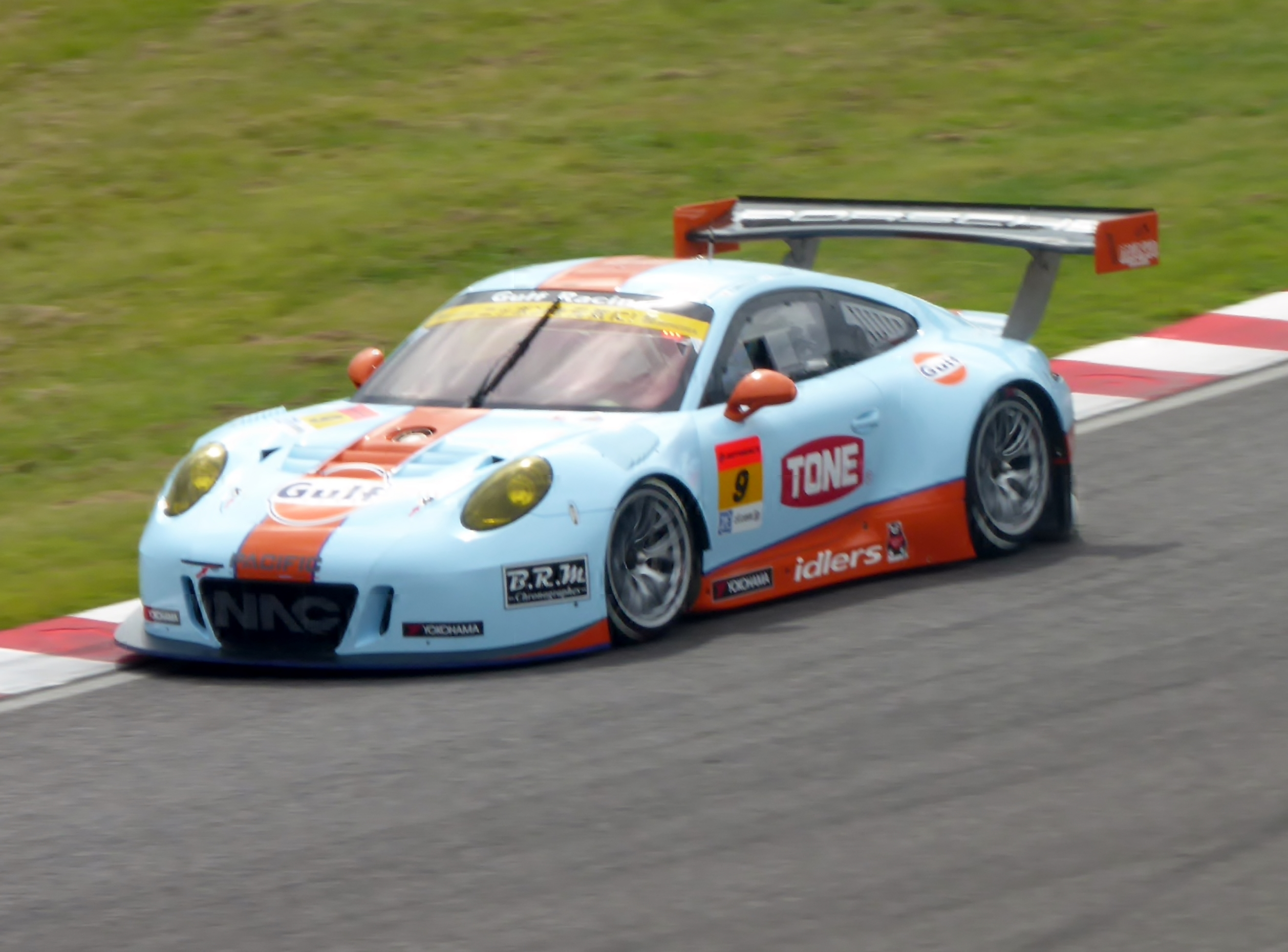
2017 Porsche 911 GT3 R (991)

==== 991.2 GT3 R (2019–2023) ====
In May 2018 Porsche introduced a new iteration of the 911 GT3 R based on the 991.2 GT3 RS for GT3 racing, available for customer teams for the 2019 season. Its 4.0-litre flat-six boxer engine, largely identical to the unit used in the GT3 and GT3 RS street cars and GT3 Cup and RSR race cars, develops approx. 405 kW (551 PS; 543 hp). Improvements include a larger diffuser for more efficient aero, double wishbone front suspension adopted from the RSR, a shim system allowing setup changes without new alignment, larger front tyres, an electro-hydraulically actuated clutch allowing the removal of the clutch pedal, a fuel cell that can be configured to be refilled from left or right of the vehicle depending on circuit layout, a rear-view camera and collision avoidance system, a fixed seat with movable pedal-box and energy-absorbing impact elements placed in the doors for improved safety as well as air conditioning. The GT3 R is priced at 459,000 Euro excluding taxes.

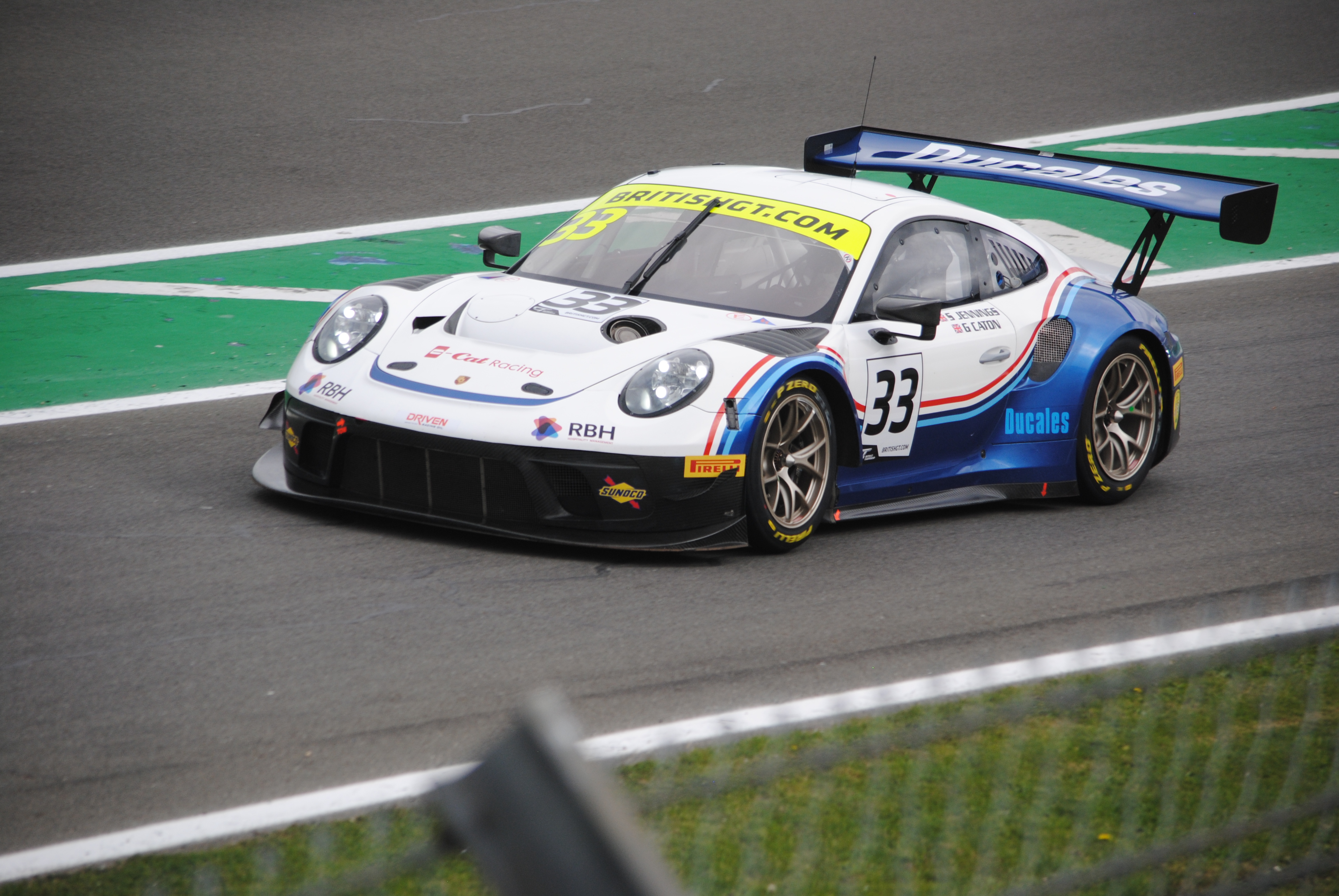
2019 Porsche 911 GT3 R (991.2)

=== 992 GT3 ===
==== 992 GT3 Cup (2021–2025) ====
On 12 December 2020 Porsche unveiled the 992 GT3 cup, replacing the 991 GT3 cup. The 992 GT3 Cup has a 4.0L naturally aspirated flat-six boxer engine developing 375 kW (510 PS; 503 bhp) at 8,400 rpm and 470 N⋅m (347 lbf⋅ft) of torque at 6,150 rpm, with a redline of 8,750 rpm. The body is made up of 70% aluminium and 30% steel reducing the weight to around 1,260 kg. Inside the car, there are new racing seats, a new carbon steering wheel and a new 260 mm (10.3 in) screen for data and diagnostics. The 911 GT3 Cup is priced at 225,000 Euro (US$267,165) excluding taxes.

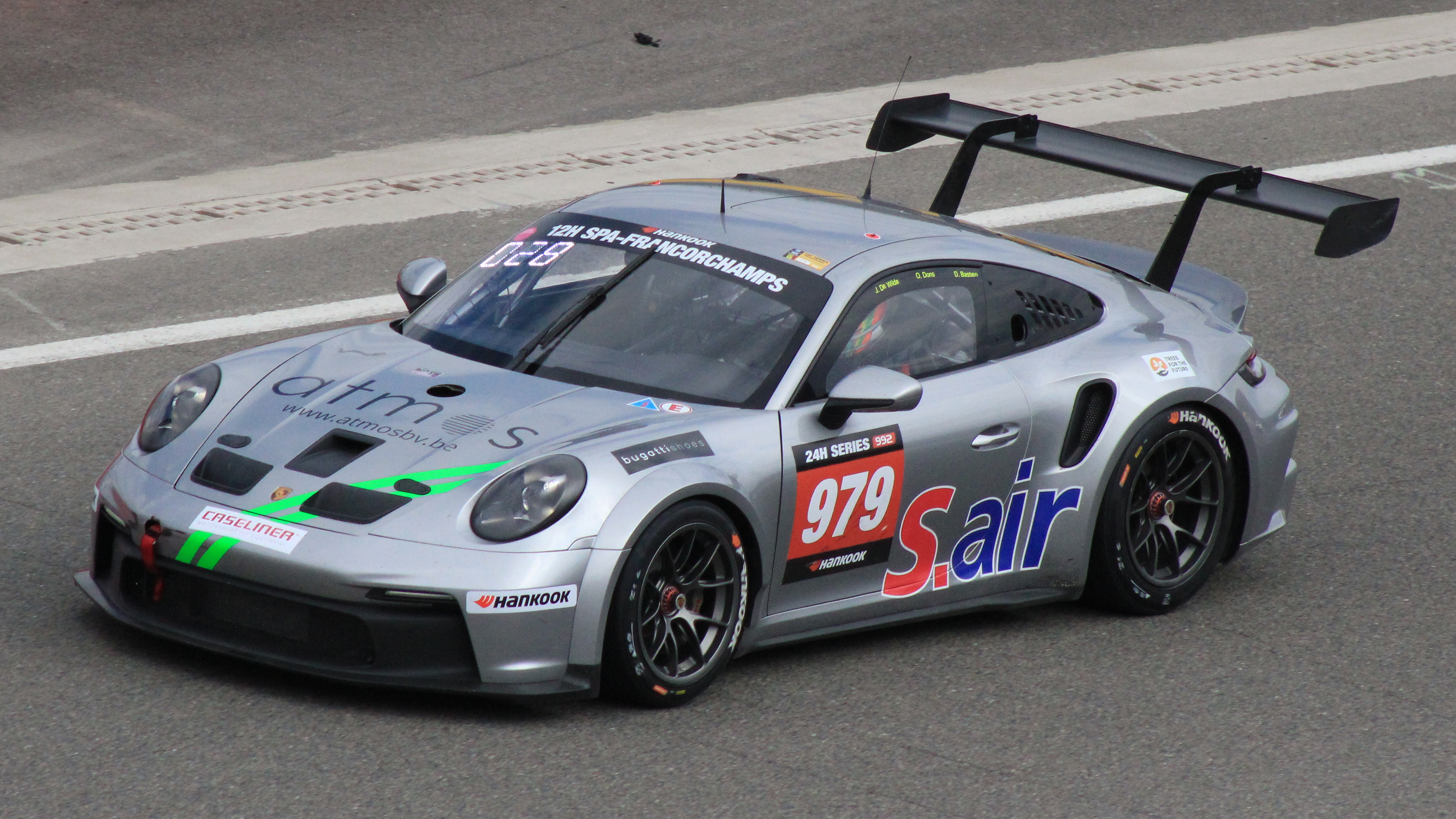
Porsche 911 GT3 Cup (992) at Circuit de Spa-Francorchamps

==== 992.2 Cup (2026–present) ====
In late 2025, Porsche revealed the 992.2 Cup, replacing the 992 GT3 Cup. The car dropped GT3 from its name to avoid confusion with the Group GT3 class, where the faster GT3 R runs. The 992.2 Cup, similar to its predecessor, has a 4.0L naturally aspirated flat-six boxer engine developing 382 kW (519 PS; 512 bhp) at 8,400 rpm and 470 N⋅m (347 lbf⋅ft) of torque at 6,150 rpm, with a redline of 8,750 rpm. The body is made up of 70% aluminium and 30% steel, bringing the weight to 1,288 kg. The new car now has the addition of an anti-lock braking system alongside the existing traction control system from its predecessor. It also features improved aerodynamics including cooling louvers located on the front wheel arches.

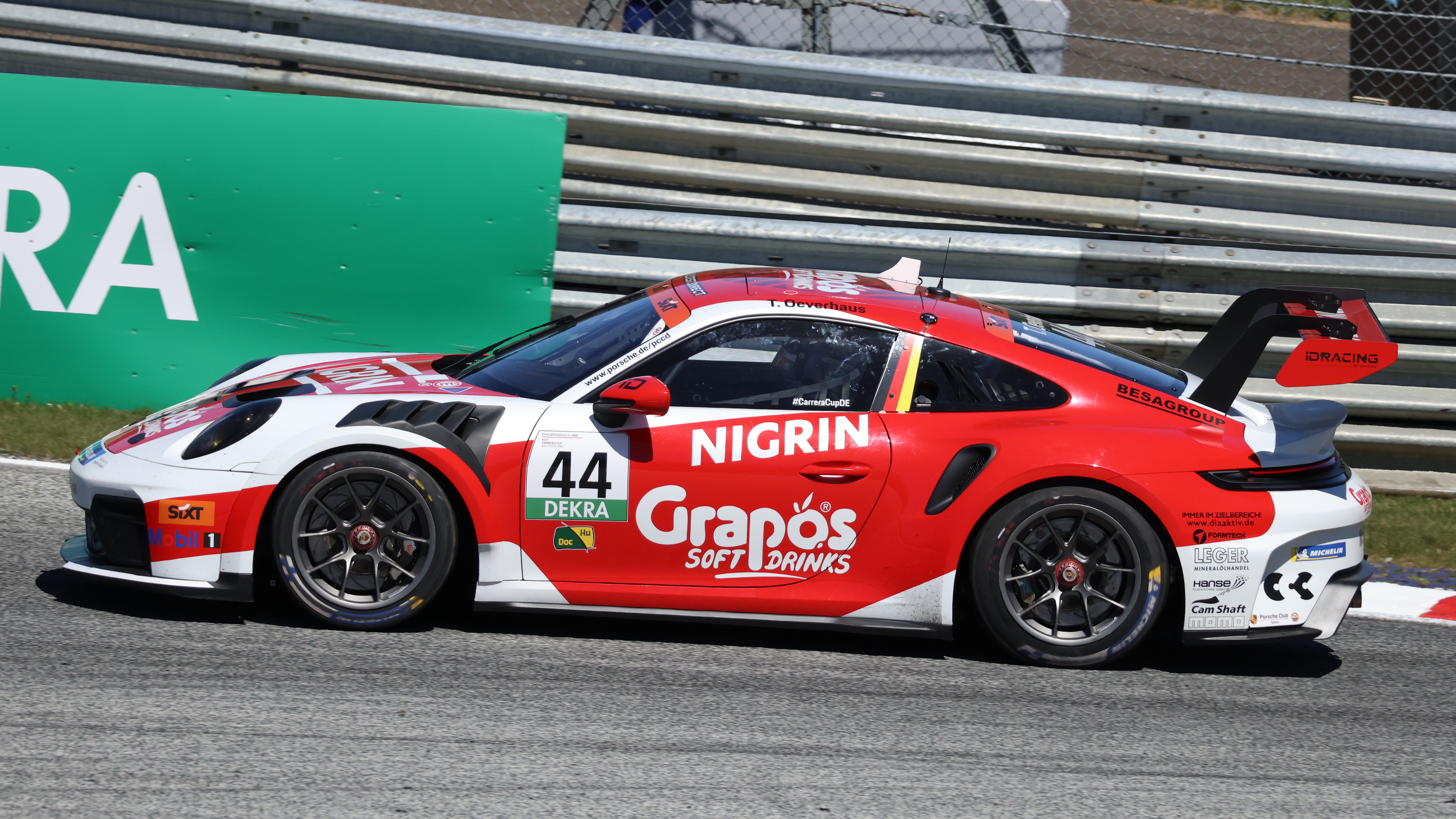
Porsche 911 Cup (992.2) at the Red Bull Ring

The Porsche 911 GT4 R is an upcoming grand touring racing car to be built by Porsche for use in SRO GT4 competition. It will serve as the replacement for the 718 Cayman GT4 RS Clubsport that has been used since 2019. The GT4 R will be the first GT4 car from Porsche to be based upon the 911 model range. The Porsche 911 GT4 R was announced in June 2026 and will be based upon the Porsche 911 GT3 Cup (992.2). Changes from the Cup model include narrower wheels, production wheel mountings, smaller rear wing and more weight. The price for the US market is $375,000, including import and delivery, while its €265,000 plus country-specific VAT elsewhere.

==== 992.2 Challenge (2027–present) ====
In August 2026, Porsche presented the 911 Challenge, a new model derived from the 992.2-spec production GT3 and designed for entry-level racing.

==== 992 GT3 R (2023–2025) ====
In the summer of 2022, Porsche unveiled the 992 generation of the 911 GT3 R. The car featured a bigger 4,194 cc engine compared to its predecessor, producing up to 421 kW (565 bhp). The car made its global racing debut at the 2023 24 Hours of Daytona, where the car suffered from ABS and traction control problems. These issues were addressed by Porsche in the following months with new updates to the car.

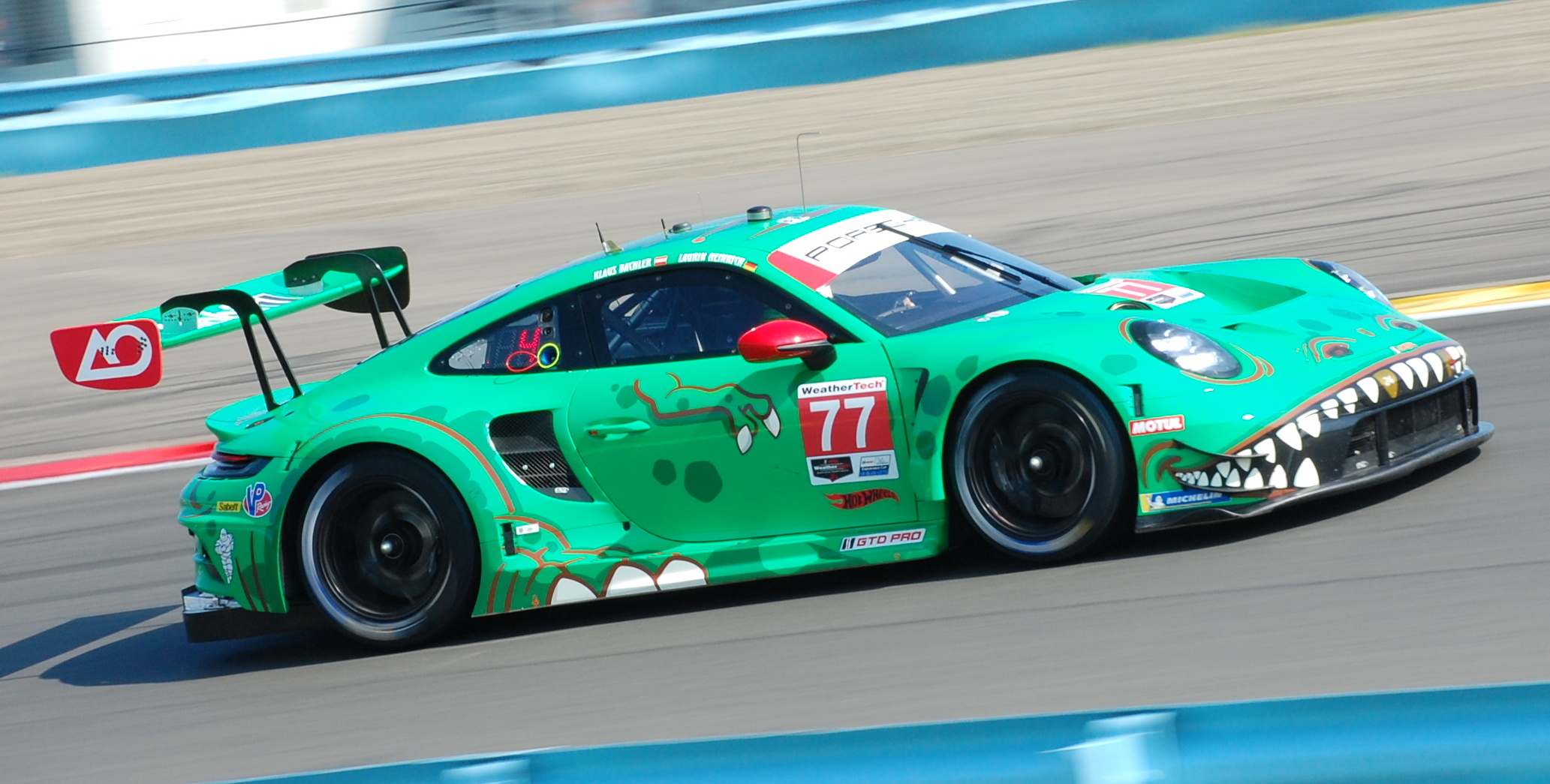
The No. 77 Porsche 911 GT3 R (992) of AO Racing during the 2025 Sahlen's Six Hours of The Glen

==== 992.2 GT3 R (2026–present) ====
In August 2025, Porsche announced a new version of the 911 GT3 R, based upon the 992.2. The upgrades include new front fender louvers, a new rear wing Gurney flap and modified rear axle kinematics. Further improvements were made to the cooling of the power steering system, new ceramic wheel bearings, and new cooling ducts for drive shafts. The new iteration made its first start with Herberth Motorsport at the 2025 12 Hours of Spa-Francorchamps in the SP4 developmental class, finishing second overall. It made its competitive debut at the 2026 24 Hours of Daytona.

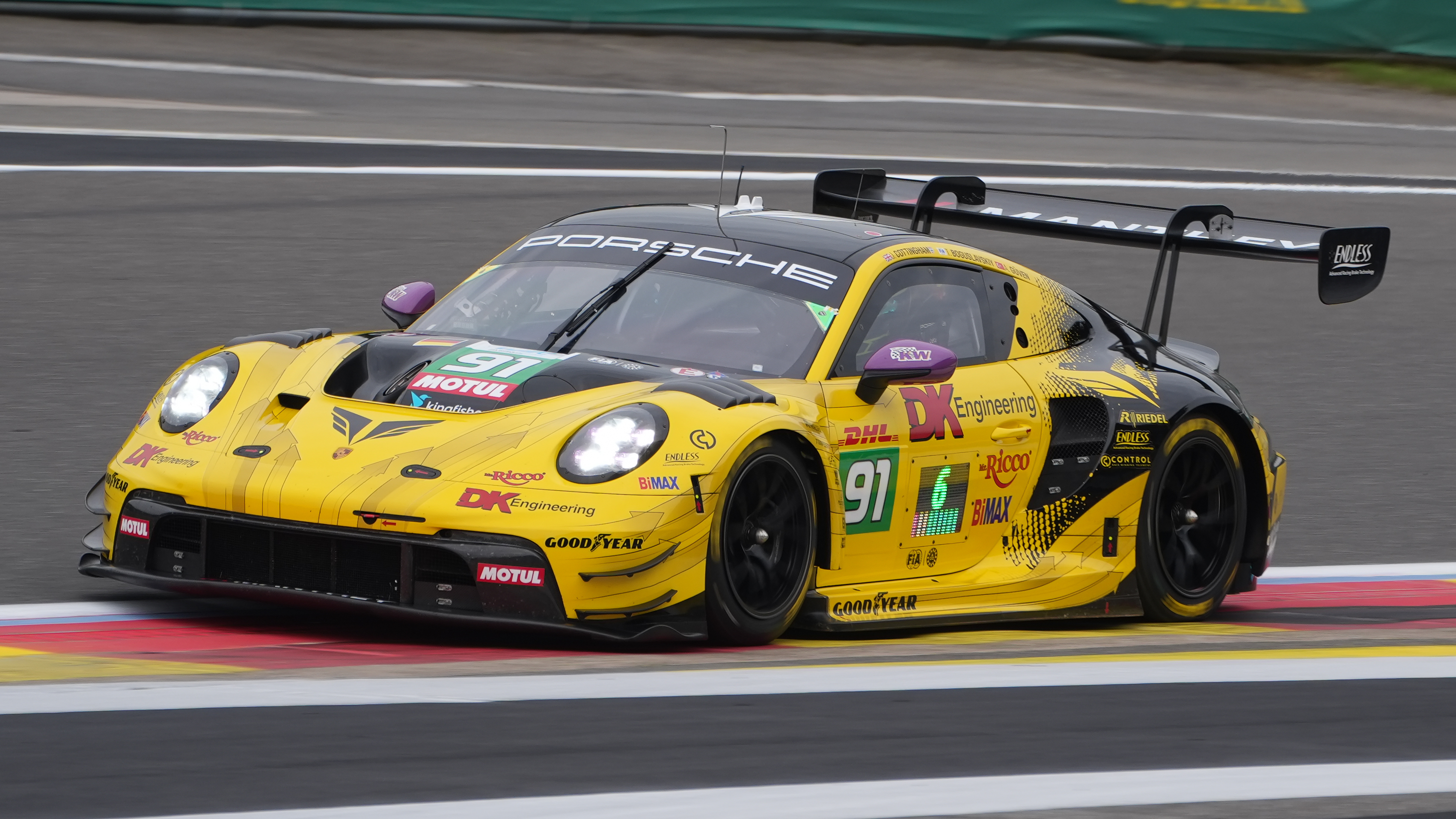
The No. 91 Porsche 911 GT3 R (992.2) of Manthey Racing during the 2026 6 Hours of Spa-Francorchamps

==== 992 GT3 R Rennsport ====
During the 2023 Rennsport reunion Porsche debuted the track-only 911 GT3 R rennsport. This car was created to celebrate Porsche's 75th anniversary. It is based on the 992 GT3 R, making it effectively an unrestricted GT3 car. Only 77 cars were produced.

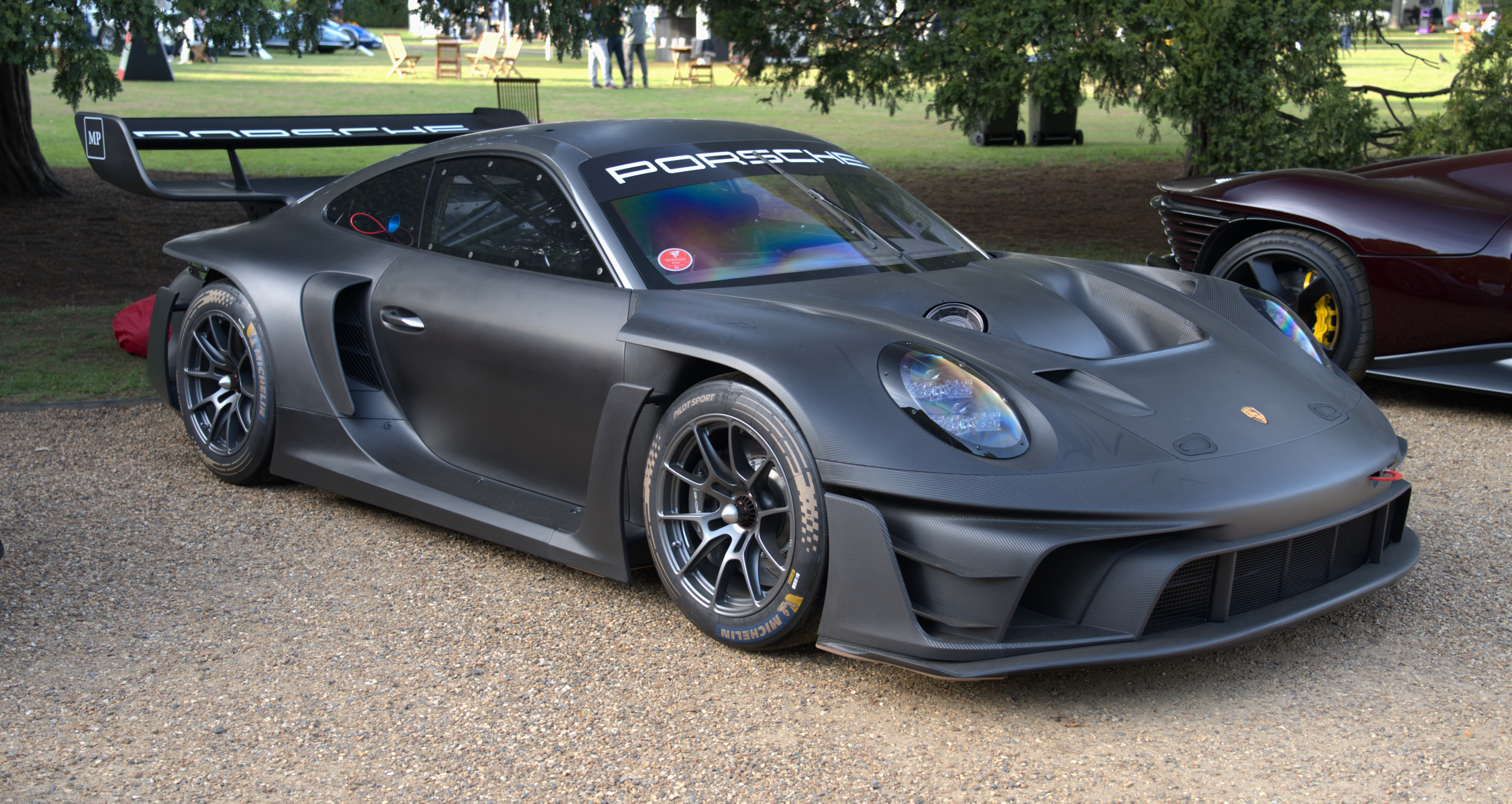
Porsche 992 GT3 R Rennsport at the Hampton Court Concours of Elegance in 2025.

=== Racing history ===
Apart from numerous class wins, the 911 GT3 won major events overall:

- 24 Hours Nürburgring in 2000, 2006, 2007, 2008, 2009, 2011, 2018, 2021 by Manthey Racing team
- Various VLN races at the Nürburgring.
- Spa 24 Hours in 2003, 2010, 2019, 2020, 2026
- 24 Hours of Daytona in 2003
- Petit Le Mans in 2015
- Bathurst 12 Hour in 2019, 2024
- Dubai 24 Hour in 2021

==== Porsche Cup ====
Various national and regional Porsche Carrera Cup and Porsche GT3 Cup Challenge as well as the international Porsche Supercup one-make series – which serves as Formula One support series – utilise the 911 GT3 since 1998.

==== 1999 ====
Due to the absence of the official Porsche team in the 1999 24 Hours of Le Mans, only privateers with the nearly obsolete air-cooled 993 GT2 Turbo were expected to represent the marque, with few chances to beat the Chrysler Viper for GTS class honors. Two new race versions of the water-cooled 996 GT3-R were entered in the GT class by private teams. The car entered by the German Manthey Racing team finished 13th overall.

==== 2000s ====
The 996 GT3-R was made available to privateer teams. In the 24 Hours Nürburgring of the year 2000, a factory-backed effort of the local Phoenix team managed to beat the Zakspeed Chrysler Viper that dominated this race from 1998 to 2000. The improved 996 GT3-RS version of 2001 was entered in countless races in the years to follow, scoring not only many class wins, but also overall wins at Daytona and Spa in 2003. In 2004, the 996 GT3-RSR was made available, with numerous improvements to the RS, including a sequential gearbox, which allows for faster gearshifts.

==== VLN ====
In 2005, the new 997-generation racing vehicles began to debut with the GT3 Cup, followed by the launch of the 911 GT3-RSR at the 2006 Spa 24 Hours. In VLN endurance races, the Manthey entry won the last 4h race before the 24h event, and then the big event also. Their Porsche 997 GT3 RSR has a larger front splitter, taller rear wing and a 368 kW; 493 bhp (500 PS) 4.0L Flat-6 engine.

==== 24 Hours of Le Mans ====
After winning the 1998 24 Hours of Le Mans outright, Porsche dominated the GT/N-GT class at Le Mans. There were no major competitors and Porsche took seven consecutive class wins from 1999 to 2005. In 2006 the Porsches led for much of the race but one by one the competitors had problems and withdrew. Last minute mechanical issues threw the Seikel car back behind the surprising winner, the Panoz Esperante GTLMM.

2007 saw the debut of the 997 GT3 RSR. IMSA Matmut took pole by more than a second over the Ferrari (but lost it after breaching Parc Fermé rules). The new Porsche was now fitted with wider rear tyres and smaller restrictors than the rules allow. This was compensated by the car weighing 100 kg more. The Porsche now stood at 1,220 kg (2,690 lb) and 357 kW; 478 bhp (485 PS). This was an advantage at Le Mans over the lighter and nimbler F430.

==== Le Mans Series ====
Felbermayr-Proton and IMSA Performance Matmut received the new 997 just before the 2007 season. Marc Lieb and Richard Lietz share the better of the two Felbermayr cars. Patrick Pilet and Raymond Narac share the IMSA car. Felbermayr-Proton won the championship in 2009 and 2010. In 2011, Nicholas Armindo won the GTE-Am class.

== See also ==
- 9ff GT9, a high-speed automobile, based on the 997 GT3
- Ruf RGT, a sports car similar to the GT3 built by Ruf Automobile
- List of best-selling automobiles
