= Porsche 911 (992) =

Eighth generation of the Porsche 911

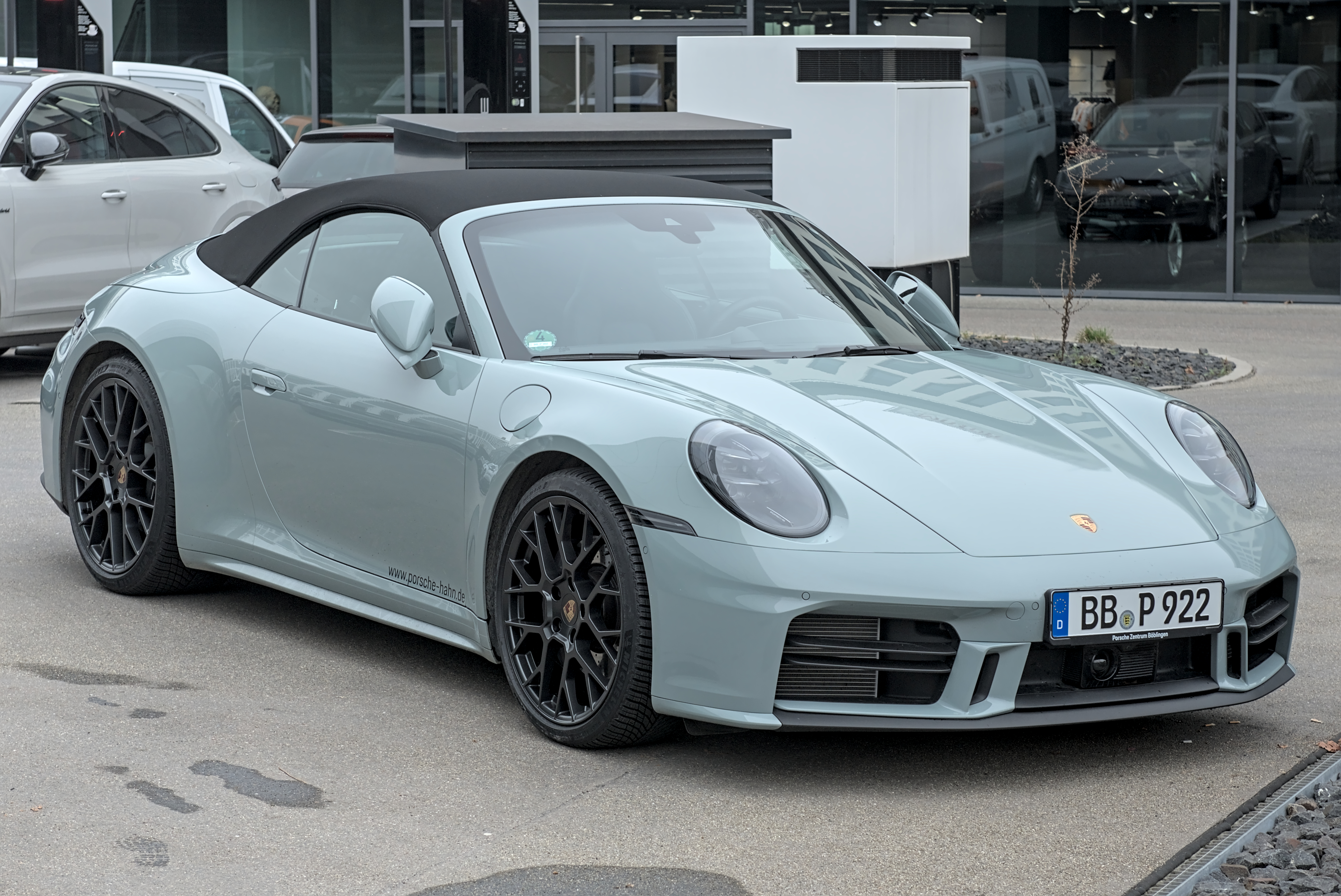
- Porsche 911 Carrera Cabriolet (992.2)

Overview
- Manufacturer: Porsche AG
- Also called: Porsche 911; Porsche Carrera
- Production: 2019–present
- Assembly: Germany: Stuttgart, Zuffenhausen
- Designer: Ben Baum under Michael Mauer

Body and chassis
- Class: Sports car (S)
- Body style: 2-door coupé; 2-door targa top; 2-door convertible
- Layout: Rear-engine, rear-wheel drive; Rear-engine, all-wheel drive
- Platform: MMB (Modular mid-engine platform)

Powertrain
- Engine: Petrol: Porsche MDC.K 3.0 L twin-turbocharged flat-6; Porsche MDB.CB 3.7 L twin-turbocharged flat-6; Porsche MA2.75 4.0 L naturally aspirated flat-6; Mild-hybrid: 3.6 L turbocharged flat-6; 3.6 L twin-turbocharged flat-6
- Electric motor: Permanent magnet synchronous electric motor
- Transmission: 6-speed manual; 7-speed manual; 7-speed PDK; 8-speed PDK
- Hybrid drivetrain: Parallel Full Hybrid (911 T-Hybrid)
- Battery: 1.9 kWh compact liquid-cooled Li-ion (T-Hybrid)

Dimensions
- Wheelbase: 2,450 mm (96.5 in)
- Length: 4,519–4,535 mm (177.9–178.5 in)
- Width: 1,852–1,900 mm (72.9–74.8 in)
- Height: 1,289–1,303 mm (50.7–51.3 in)
- Kerb weight: 1,380–1,710 kg (3,042–3,770 lb)

Chronology
- Predecessor: Porsche 911 (991)

The Porsche 992 is the eighth and current generation of the Porsche 911 sports car, which was introduced at the Porsche Experience Center in Los Angeles on 27 November 2018.

== Design ==
Logo.

The 992 uses rack and pinion steering, along with MacPherson strut front suspension and rear multi-link suspension. The 992 has wide rear-wheel arches which will be a part of every model in the 992 generation (a design feature limited chiefly to high performance variants of previous 911 iterations) along with 20-inch wheels at the front and 21-inch wheels at the rear.

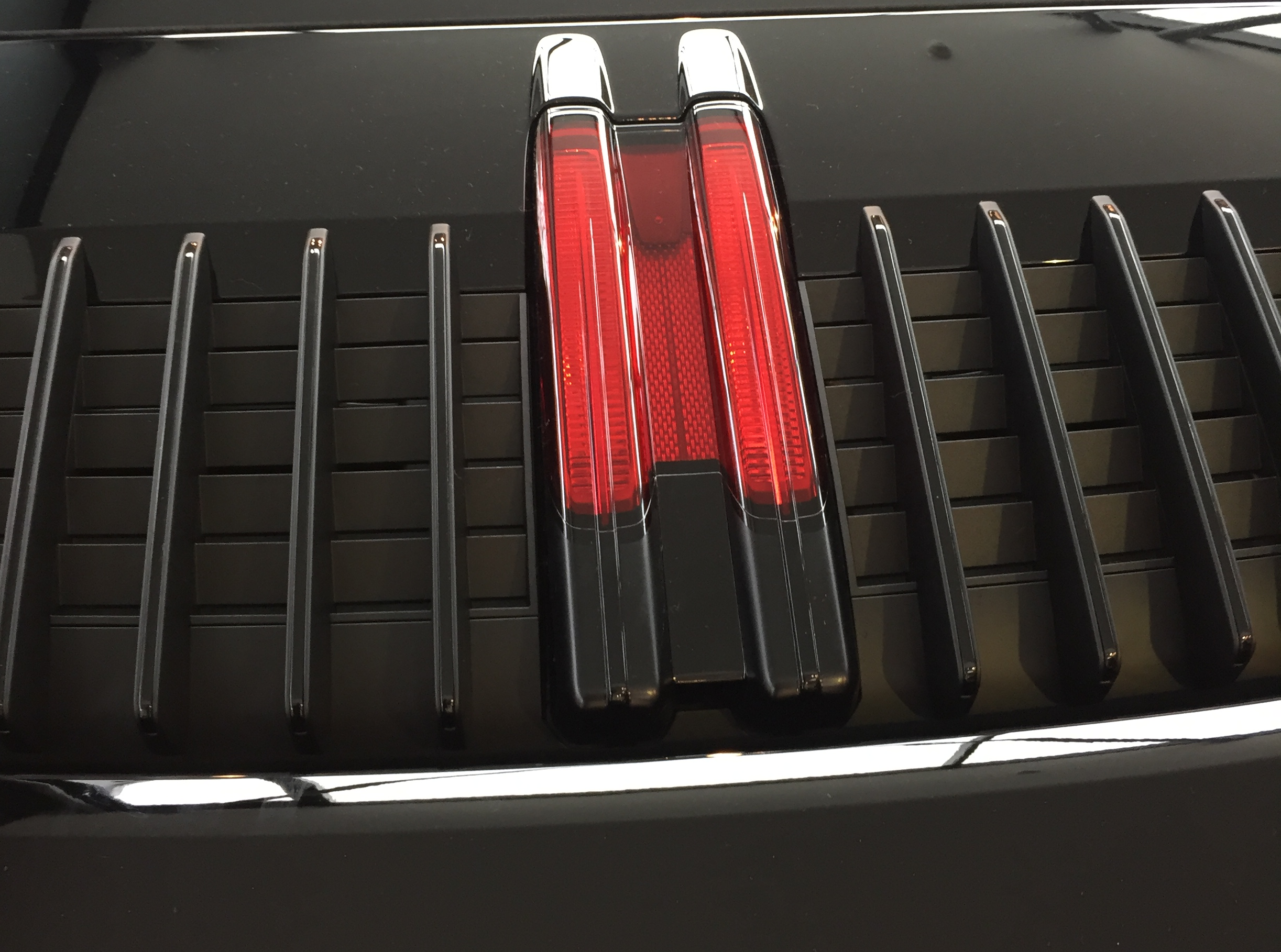
Styled '11' as third brakelight in the middle of the rear duct is preceded by 9 vertical slats subtly indicating "911" as the model.

Compared to its predecessor, the 992 is 45 mm (1.8 in) wider and now uses aluminium body panels. The 992 also has a new rear bumper with larger exhaust tips than its predecessor. The front of the car is designed to mimic the appearance of an early 911 in a modern fashion. 992 models have electrical pop-out door handles, a retractable rear spoiler (for specific models only) and LED headlights. All models also feature a full-length rear light bar. The interior has also received significant changes, including a straighter dashboard which resembles the shape of the dash board used on the classic 911. The instrument cluster has two 7-inch digital displays, as well as an analogue tachometer, which also references classic 911 models.

The engines have piezo injection, a revised intake system, and—in some markets under Euro-6 regulations—engine particulate filters. At launch, the only available transmission was an 8-speed PDK dual-clutch transmission, although a 7-speed and 6-speed manual are now also available. The manual 7-speed will only be offered on the GTS and the 6-speed on the GT3 models initially, both of which will have the Sport Chrono Package as standard equipment alongside the manual transmission.

== Equipment ==
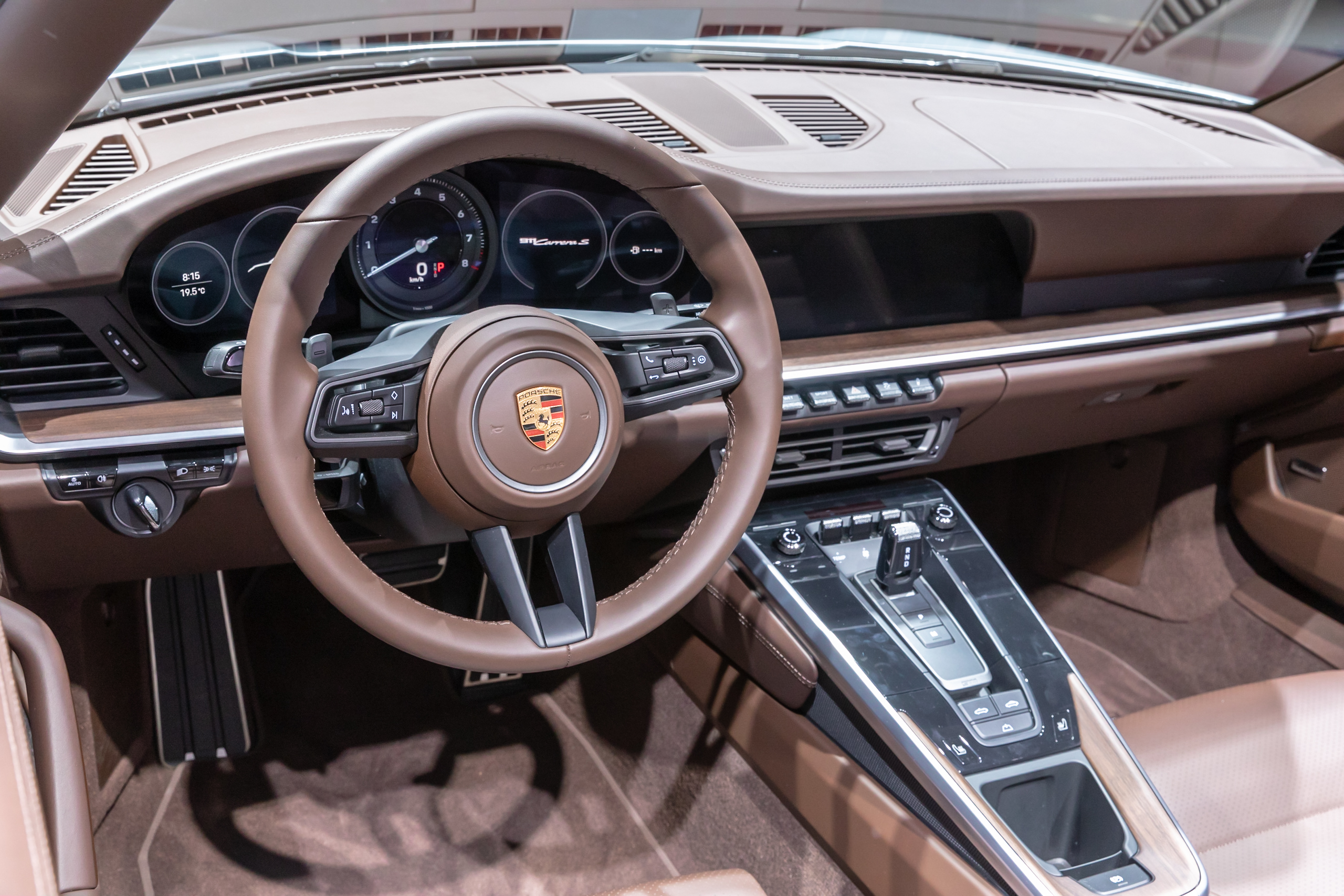
Interior

Standard equipment includes a 10.9-inch display with Porsche Communication Management (PCM) and navigation system, a 8-speed PDK transmission and driver-assistance systems including collision detection with braking intervention. A Wet Mode feature is also introduced on the 992 which uses acoustic sensors on the wheel wells to detect wet pavement and adjusts the stability control, the rear wing position, and gearbox responsiveness to keep the car stable. Optional equipment includes adaptive cruise control, night vision and sports suspension which lowers the car by 10 mm (0.4 in). A Sport Chrono package is also available on all models and features an overboost function that provides increased performance for 20 seconds. 0–100 km/h (62 mph) acceleration times are decreased by 0.2 second with the Sport Chrono package.

== First Phase (992.1) ==
=== Carrera, Carrera 4, Carrera S and Carrera 4S ===
The first models to debut in November 2018 in the 992 lineage were the Carrera S and Carrera 4S, displayed at the 2018 LA Auto Show. Both of the models are powered by a 3.0-litre twin-turbocharged flat-6 engine. The Carrera S and Carrera 4S Cabriolet followed in January 2019 while the base Carrera and Carrera 4 was introduced in July 2019.

In 2019, a 911 Carrera 4S Ben Pon Jr. Edition was revealed. It had standard Sport Design bumpers, 5 spoke rims and unique Fish Silver Grey color. Production was limited to just 20 units.

In 2020, Porsche introduced 911 Carrera 4S Belgian Legend Edition. It was designed in honor of Belgian racing legend Jacky Ickx to celebrate his 75th birthday. It was painted in X Blue color, which wasn't available for other models. The interior had stitching in the shape of an ‘X’, white accents on the seats, and Ickx's signature on the armrest. Only 75 cars were made.

A 911 Carrera S Chili Edition was designed exclusively for Indonesia. It offered 3 colors: White, Black and GT Silver Metallic. Rims, side mirrors, bumper lip, rear wing and Porsche decals could be colored in one of 3 colors: Guards Red, Phyton Green and Lava Orange. The car had an Aerokit package as standard. Just nine cars were produced.

A 911 Carrera 4S Porsche Centrum Gelderland Exclusive Edition was made specially for Porsche Centrum Gelderland, it was only sold in Netherlands featuring Gulf Blue color, 5-spoke black rims with orange bordering, orange side Porsche decal, and orange interior stitching. The car was also available in Carrera 4S Cabriolet and Targa 4S version. Two coupes, two cabriolets and two targas were made.

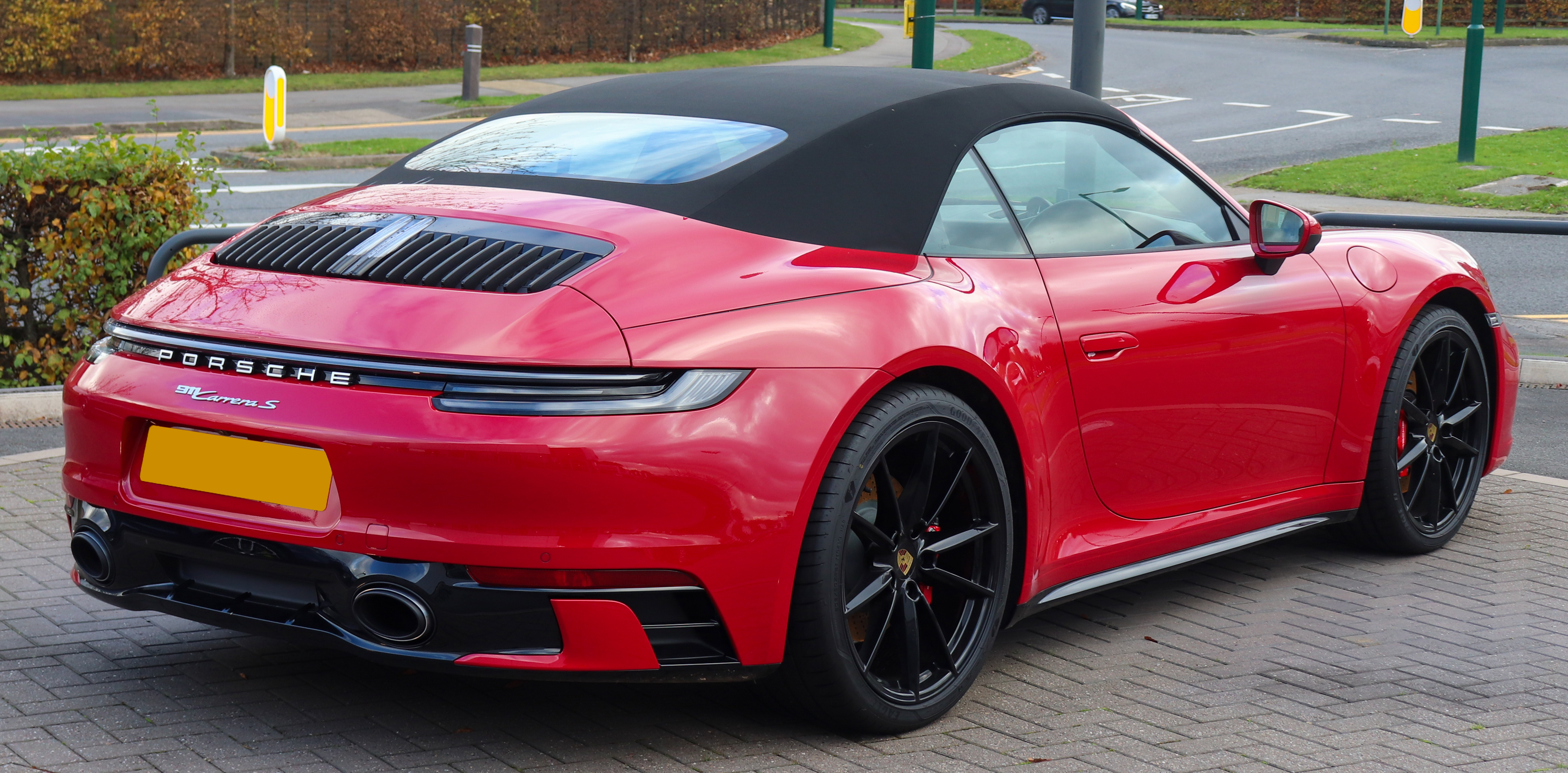
911 Carrera S cabriolet

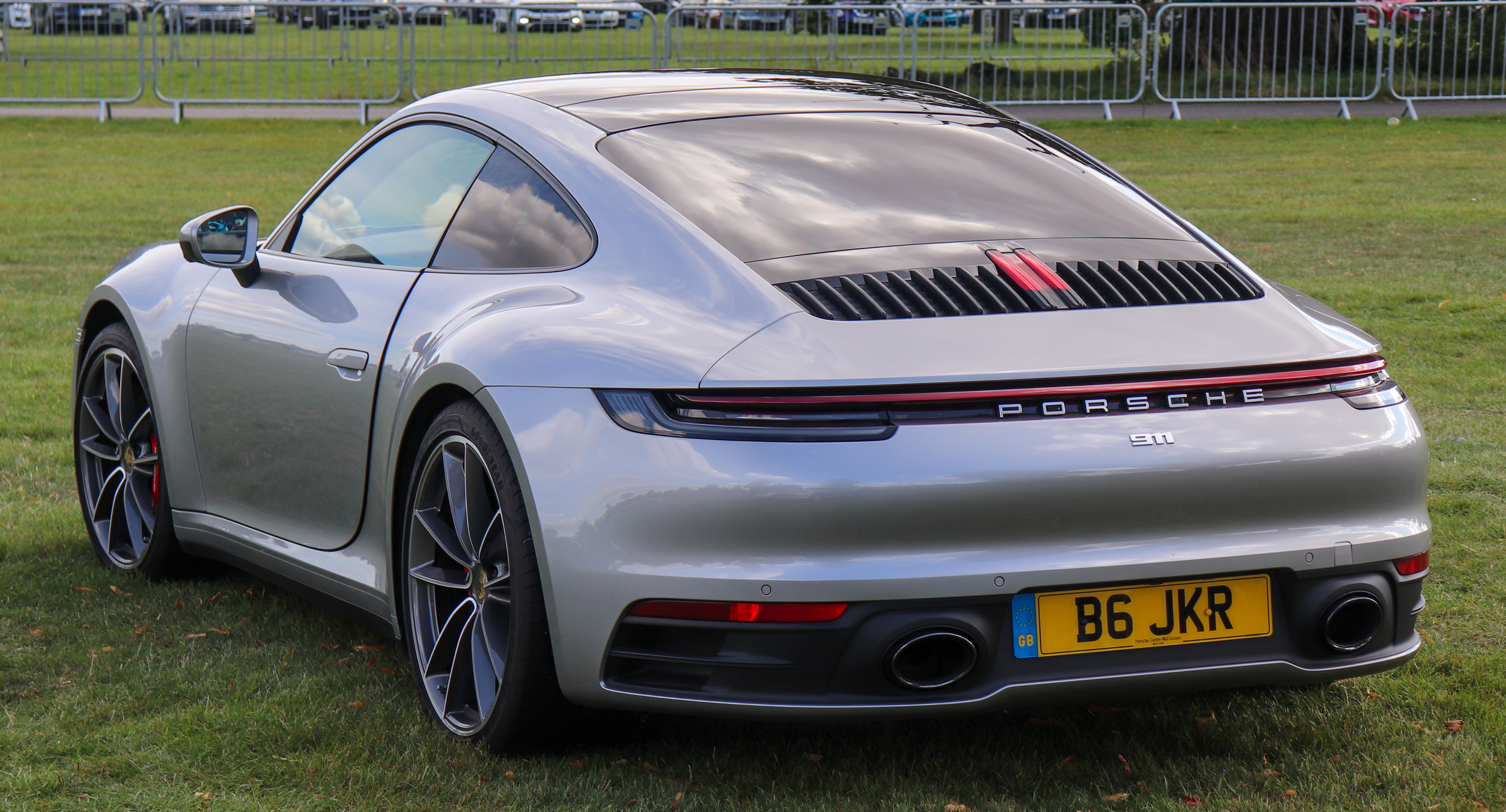
911 Carrera S coupé

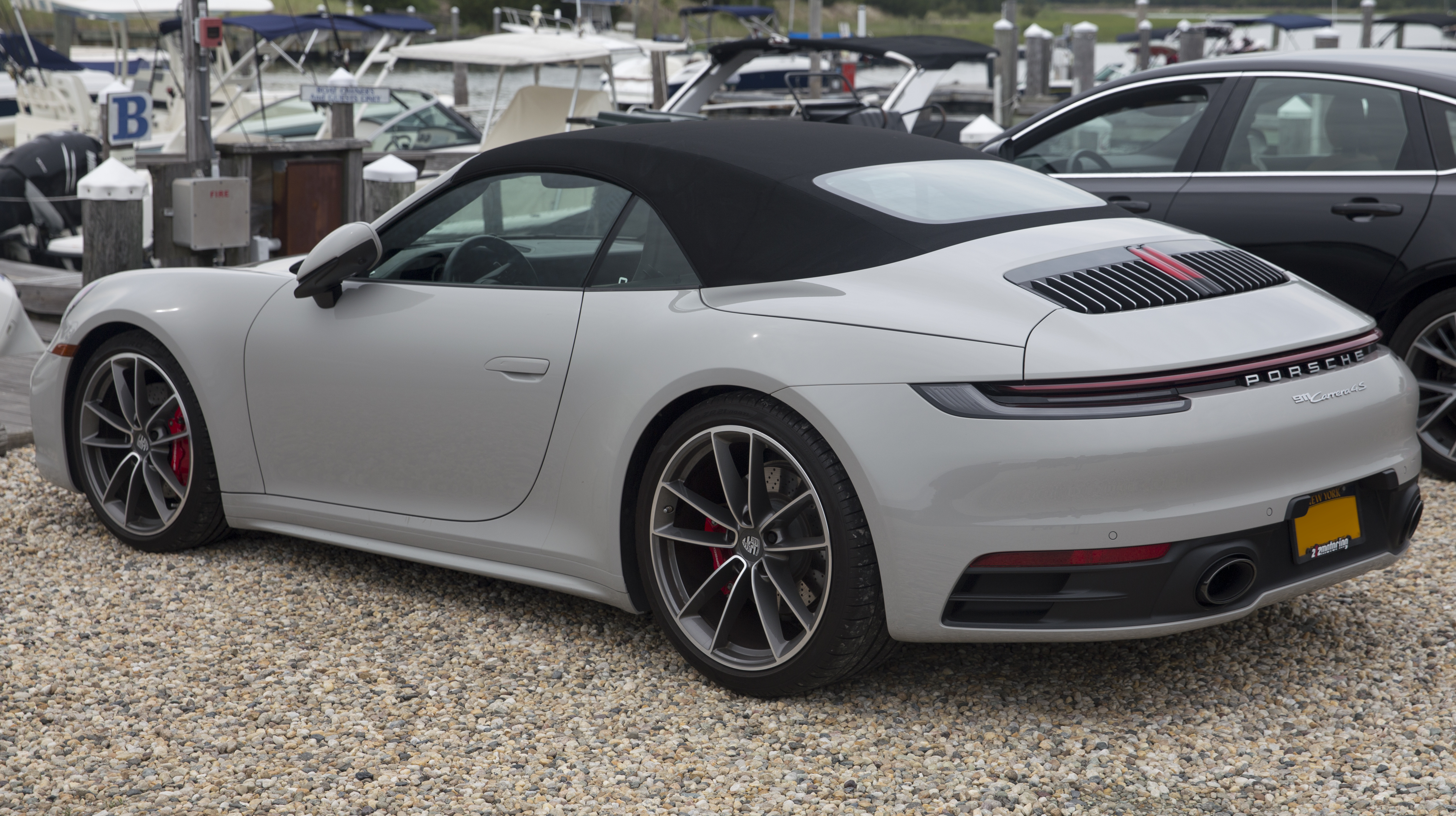
911 Carrera 4S cabriolet

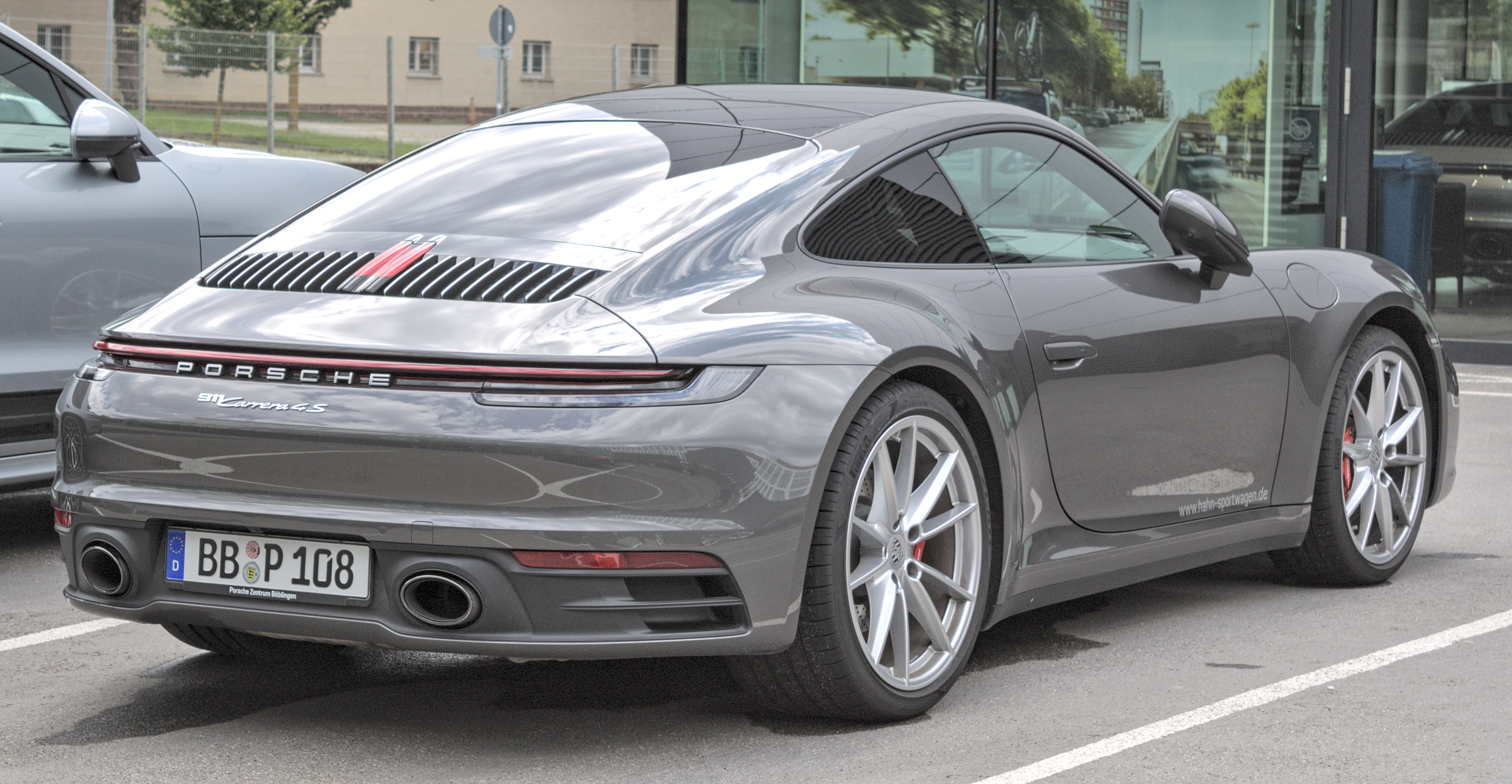
911 Carrera 4S coupé

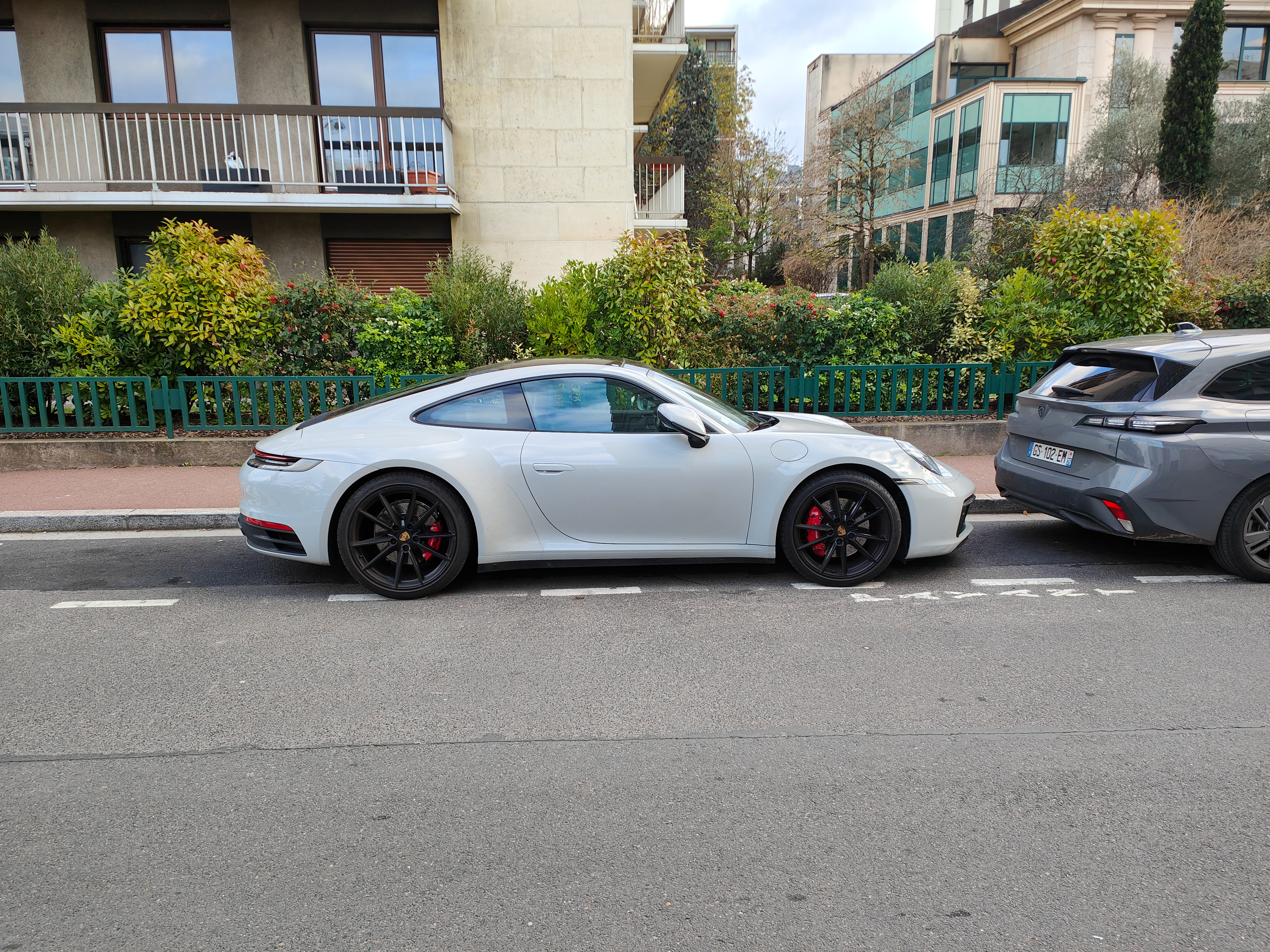
911 Carrera S

=== Targa 4 and Targa 4S ===
The Targa body style for the 992-generation 911 premiered on the Porsche web-TV channel 9:11 Magazine on 18 May 2020. The models share the all-wheel drive drivetrain of the Carrera 4 with 8-speed PDK transmission and Carrera 4S with PDK or optional seven-speed manual, respectively. Both models are powered by a 3.0-litre twin-turbo flat-six engine, which in the Targa 4 is rated at 283 kW (380 hp; 385 PS) and 450 N⋅m (332 lb⋅ft) of torque. The power output was increased by 11 kW (15 hp; 15 PS) as compared to its predecessor. In the Targa 4S, the flat-six is rated at 331 kW (444 hp; 450 PS), which is 22 kW (30 hp; 30 PS) more than its predecessor, and a maximum torque of 530 N⋅m (391 lb⋅ft), which is 30 N⋅m (22 lb⋅ft) more.

The Targa 4 is fitted with 330 mm (13.0 in) discs on both axles while the Targa 4S has larger 350 mm (13.8 in) discs on both axles. The Porsche Active Suspension Management (PASM) is part of the standard equipment for the new 911 Targa models. The Porsche Torque Vectoring Plus (PTV Plus), which includes an electronic rear differential lock with fully variable torque distribution, is standard for the Targa 4S and is optional on the Targa 4.

In June 2020, Porsche revealed the Targa 4S Heritage Design Edition. The car uses design elements from early Carrera models with for example teardrops on each front fender and the motorsports graphics on the flanks. The car can be ordered with either the seven-speed manual transmission or PDK dual-clutch automatic and the worldwide production is limited to only 992 units.

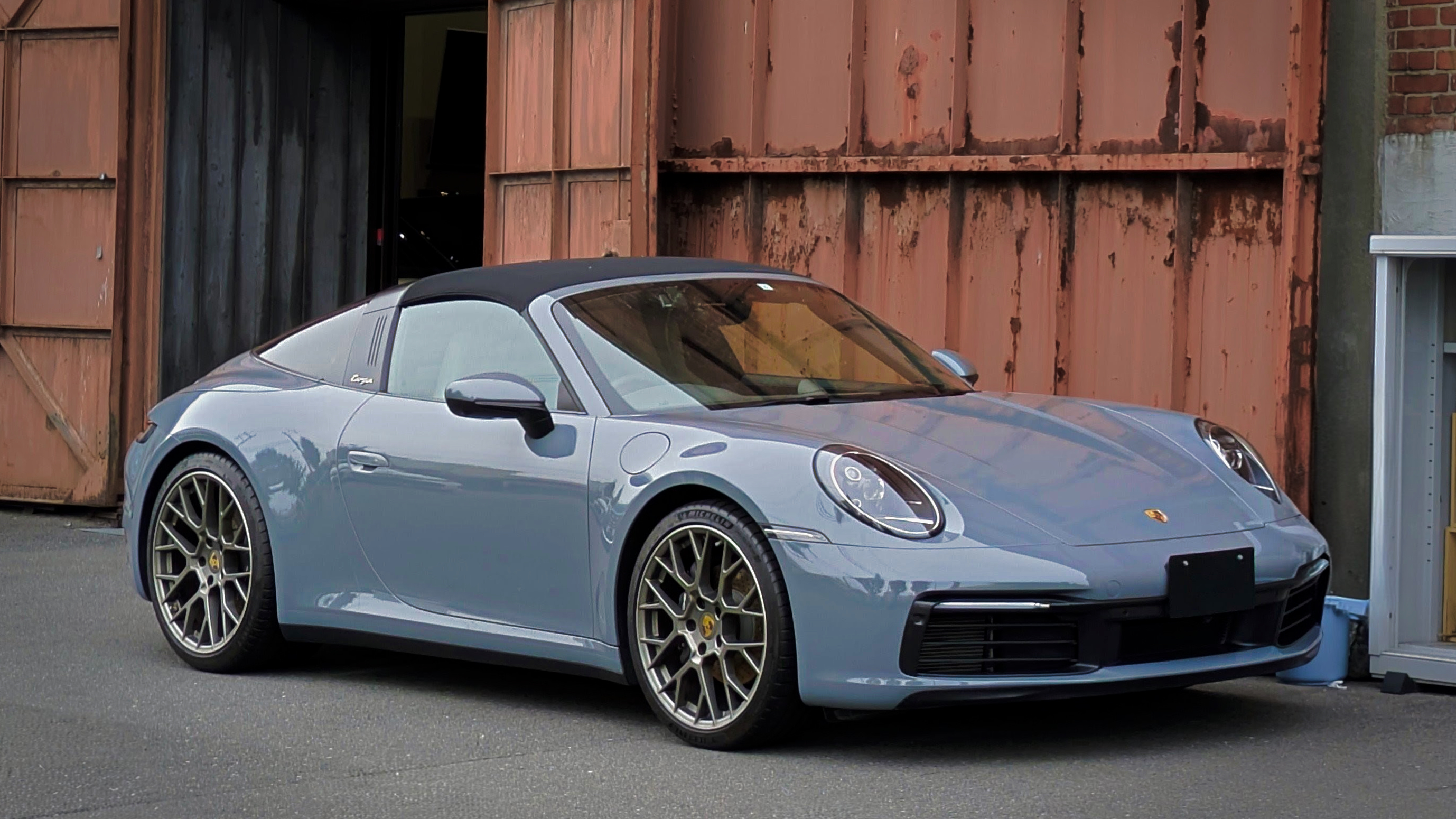
992 Targa 4

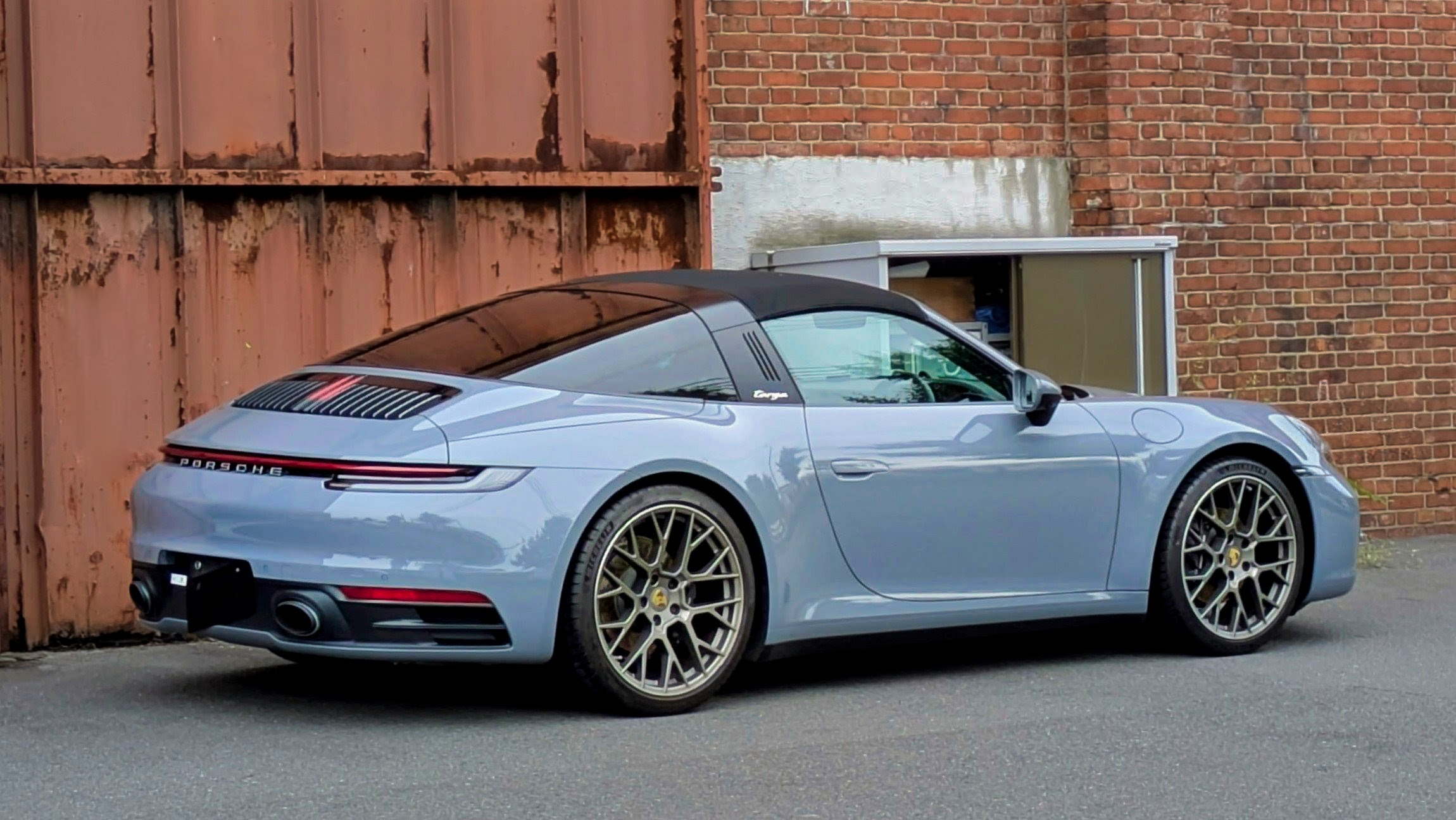
992 Targa 4

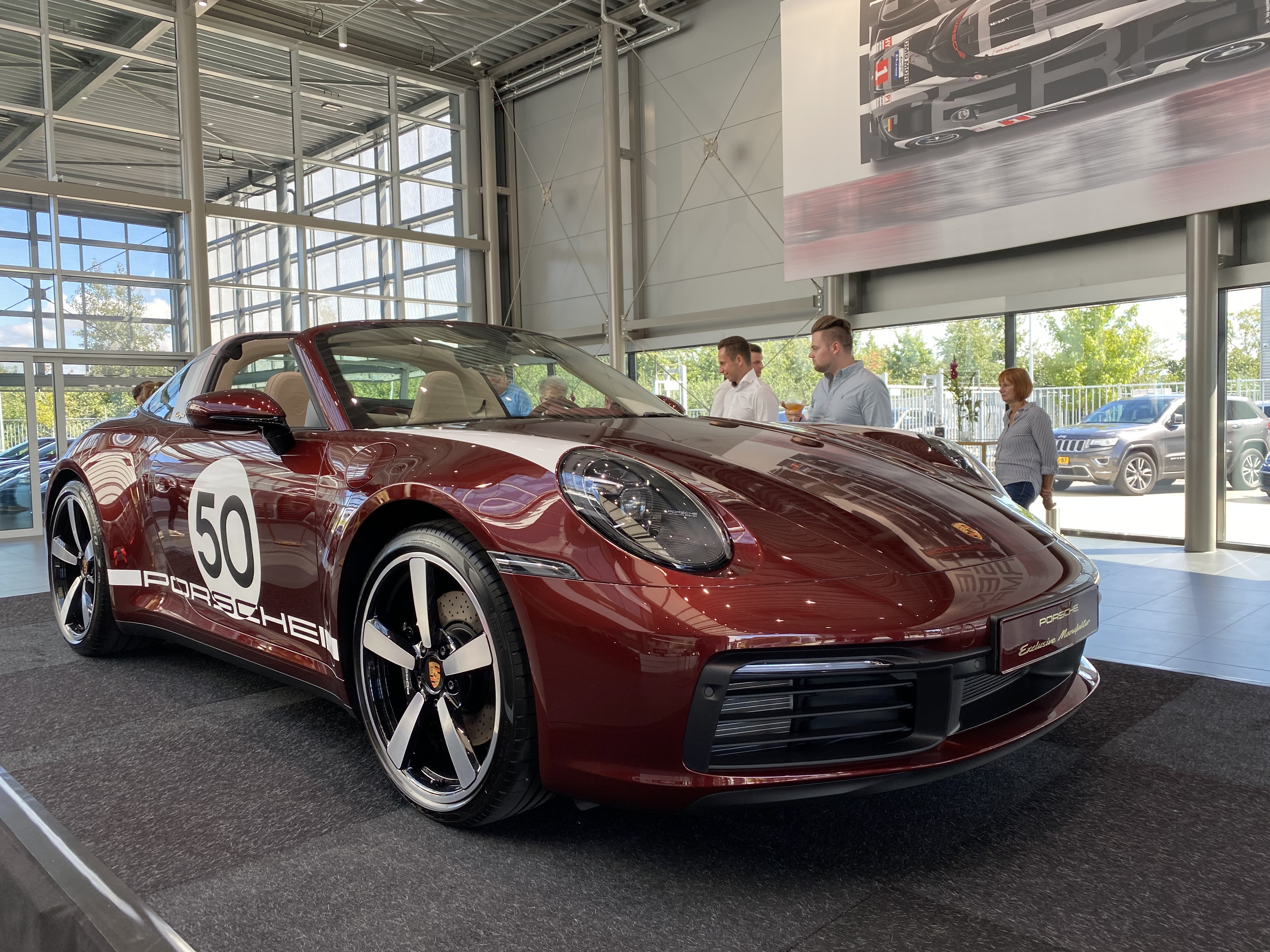
992 Targa 4S Heritage Design Edition

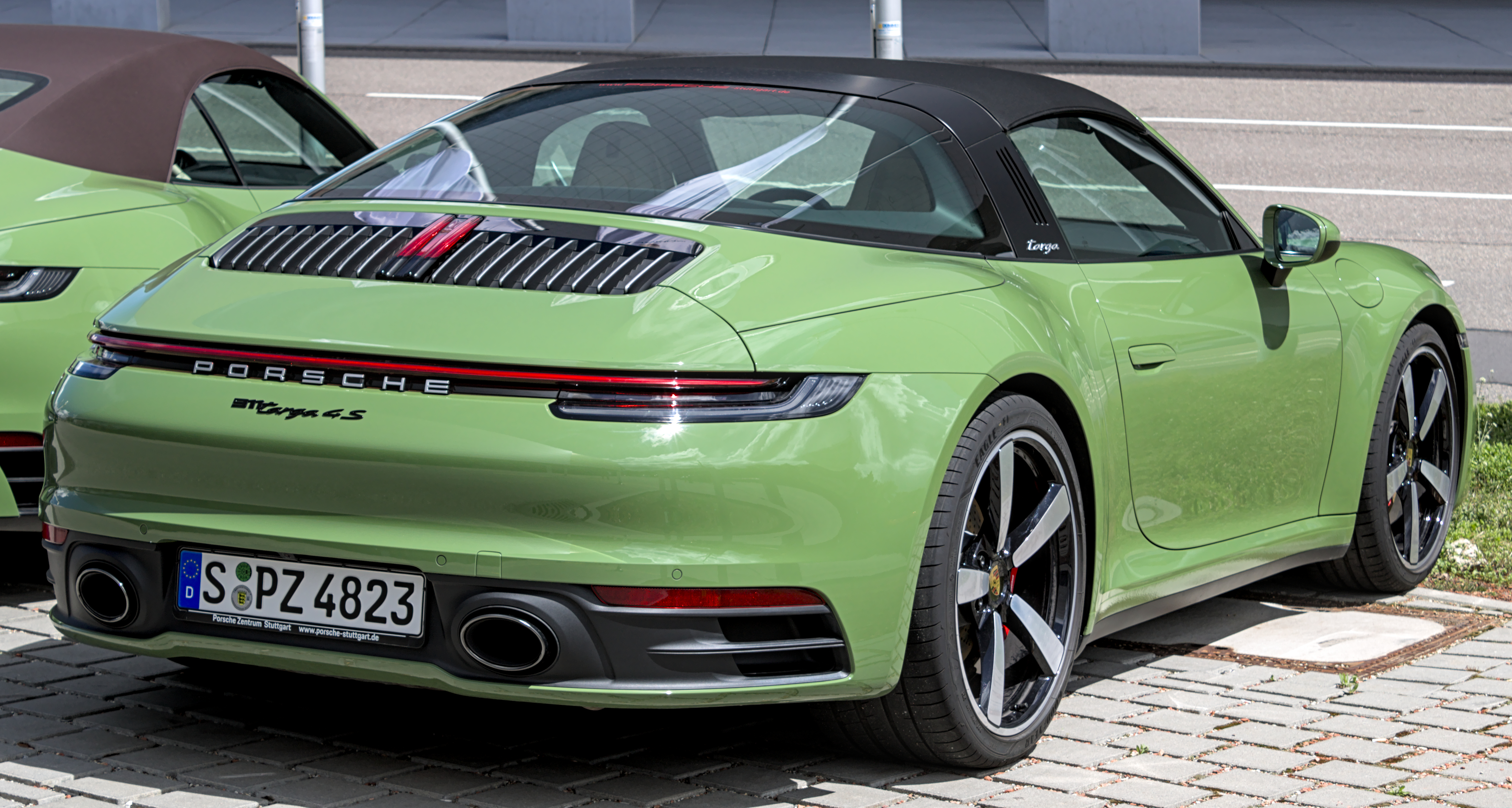
992 Targa 4S

=== Carrera GTS, Carrera 4 GTS, Targa 4 GTS ===
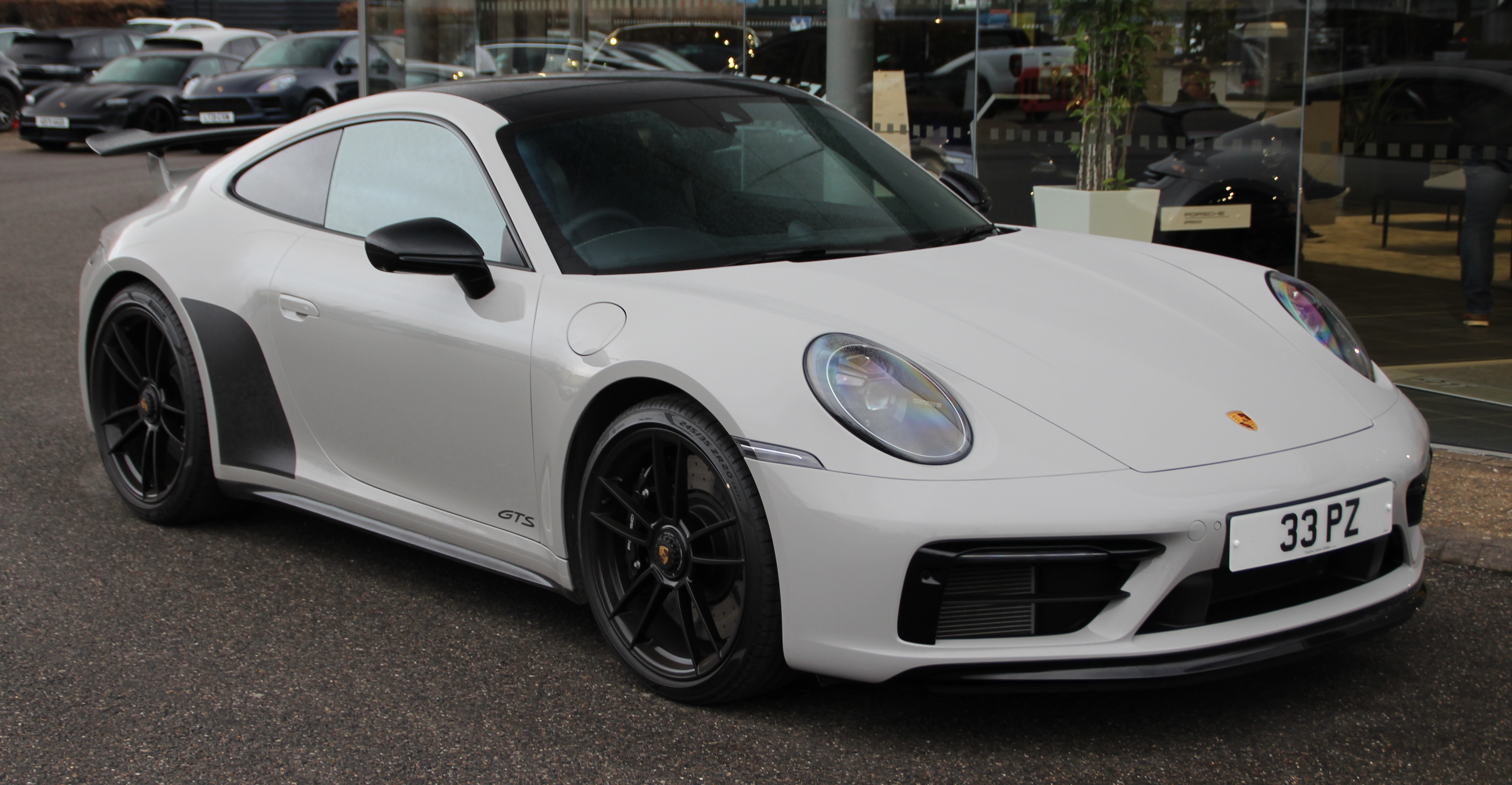
911 Carrera GTS Front

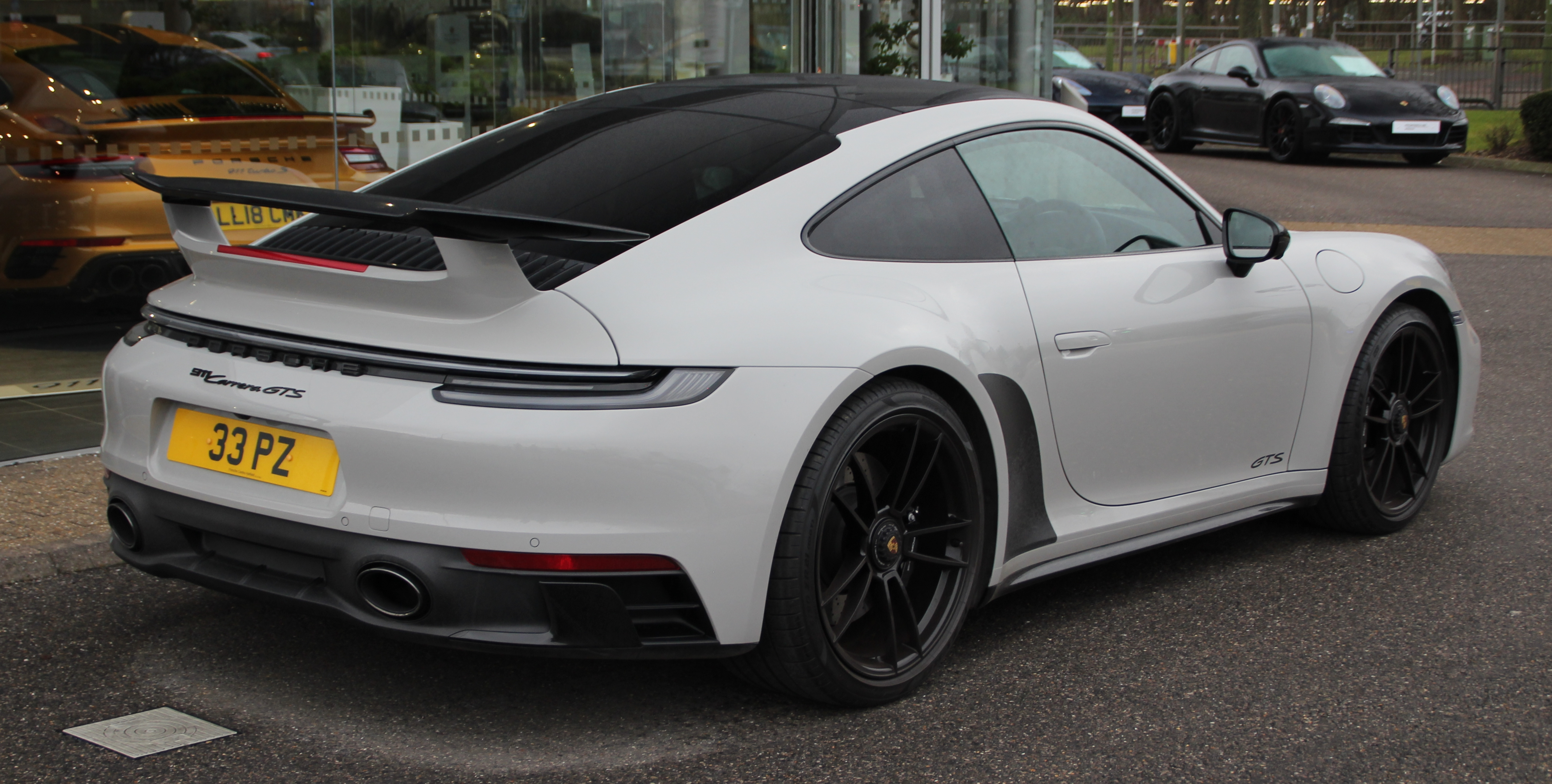
911 Carrera GTS Rear

Porsche launched the Carrera GTS, Carrera 4 GTS, and Targa 4 GTS in 2021. The Carreras both used the twin-turbocharged 3L flat-6 which produced a power of 480 PS (473 hp; 353 kW) and a maximum torque of 651 N⋅m (480 lb⋅ft), while the Targa used the same engine but with a displacement of 2.9 litres.

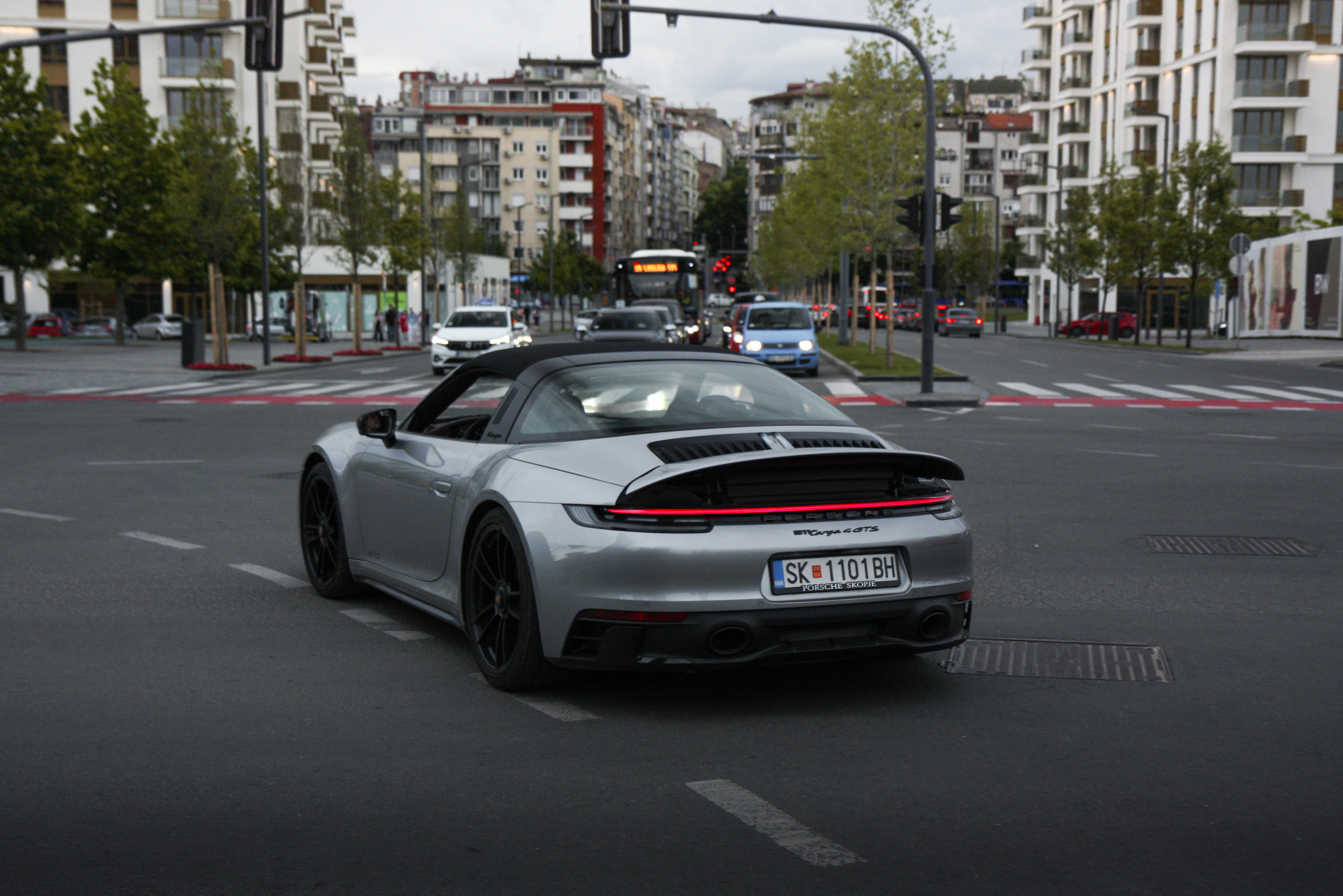
911 Targa 4 GTS Rear view

Unlike the previous generation, the Carrera GTS and 4 GTS had an Aerokit option that replaced the deployable spoiler with a fixed spoiler and wing.

In 2022, Porsche released the Porsche 911 Edition 50 Years Porsche Design, a car based on the 911 Targa 4 GTS, to celebrate the 50th anniversary of Porsche Design. The exterior is painted black which regards to the color of the first Porsche Design timepiece, while the accents and Targa bar are painted platinum. The car also features an exclusive side sticker and a Porsche Design clock behind the infotainment screen. The production of the 911 Edition 50 Years Porsche Design was limited to 750 units and each was bought with an exclusive Porsche Design timepiece that had a number that relates to the car.

In June 2022, for 2023 model year, Porsche introduced 911 Carrera GTS Cabriolet America Edition. It has Azureblue356 color, inspired by 1953 356 America. The car also offers white RS Spyder Design rims with red bordering. Also there are white decals with "America" lettering. Interior has two-tone stitching in Guards Red and Pebble Grey. 115 units were produced only for USA market.

In August 2022, 911 Carrera GTS 50 Years Porsche of Taiwan Edition was revealed. This model celebrates 50 years of Porsche in Taiwan. Back in 1972, the first Porsche officially introduced in Taiwan was 911E. The car offers Irish Green paintjob, white side stickers which represents the silhouette of the Formosa’s coastline. Also the car has special edition badges inside and outside.

Also, in August 2022, Porsche showed one-off 911 Carrera GTS Sally Special. Referring to Sally Carrera in the Cars franchise, it was painted in unique Sallybluemetallic color, which was developed only for this project. The car also got unique 5-spoke rims. The interior is also unique and made out of white leather with special Pepita houndstooth fabric upholstery. Also, same as the film character, under the spoiler there is a blue "tattoo". The car was sold on auction for a shocking $3.6 million.

In March 2023, Porsche revealed 911 Carrera GTS 30 Years Porsche Thailand Edition. In Thailand, the day of the week a person is born is very important. In the past, Thais would dress to the color of the day. This edition features seven colors (seven days of a week): Signal Yellow (Monday), Rubystar (Tuesday), Signal Green (Wednesday), Pastel Orange (Thursday), Riviera Blue (Friday), Ultraviolet (Saturday), Fire Red (Sunday). On the B-pillars, "30 Years Porsche Thailand Edition" plaque is proudly hand-applied. In the interior, there are body colored accents. Also, the engine grille on the back is painted in the colors of Thailand flag. Production numbers are unknown.

In June 2023, Porsche presented 911 Carrera GTS Le Mans Centenaire Edition specially for French market. The car is painted in Le Mans Silver Metallic color, also has many special badges around the car, custom side number decal and gold rims. The interior is made in Graphite Blue color. 75 units were produced.

=== Turbo and Turbo S ===
Introduced in March 2020, the 992 Turbo S has a twin-turbocharged 3.7-litre flat-6 engine rated at 478 kW (650 PS; 641 hp) and 800 N⋅m (590 lb⋅ft) of torque. The engine is based on the 3.0 litre unit found in the Carrera models and has a slightly shorter stroke than that of the outgoing Turbo S engine. The compression ratio has also decreased to 8.7:1. The car can accelerate to 100 km/h (62 mph) in 2.7 seconds (2.8 seconds for the convertible), to 200 km/h (124 mph) in 8 seconds, and has a top speed of 330 km/h (205 mph). Both the turbochargers and the air intake system are larger, with the latter now being located directly behind the engine instead of in the rear fenders as on previous 911 Turbo models. The rear fenders now house the air filters instead.

Two new factory options are available: Active Suspension Management and a sport exhaust. Standard equipment includes Porsche dynamic chassis control (PDCC), rear-axle steering and ceramic composite brakes. The front now has adaptive cooling flaps, while the rear wing is larger and generates 15 percent more downforce than the previous model. Active anti-rollbars, adaptive dampers and rear wheel steering are standard features. In a test conducted by Sport Auto on 30 January 2021, the 992 Turbo S lapped the Nürburgring Nordschleife in 7:17.3 minutes, which made it the fastest road-legal production vehicle to lap the racetrack without using semi-slick tires.

In July 2020, the Turbo variant was introduced. It has the same twin turbocharged 3.7-litre flat-6 engine, detuned to 427 kW (580 PS; 572 hp) and 750 N⋅m (553 lb⋅ft) of torque thanks to a slightly smaller turbo compressor wheel and different mapping. The lesser version comes standard with four square exhaust tips rather than the twin oval sport exhaust system of the Turbo S, as well as cast-iron brake discs with red calipers and five-lug wheels rather than the carbon ceramic units, yellow calipers, and center lock wheels. However, nearly all of the Turbo S extras are available to the regular Turbo as well.

In 2024, the Porsche 911 Turbo celebrated its 50th anniversary. To commemorate this milestone, Porsche introduced a special limited-edition model, the 911 Turbo 50. A total of 1,974 units were produced worldwide, symbolizing the year 1974, when the first 911 Turbo was launched.

The Turbo 50 was designed with collectors in mind and featured a heritage design package, which included details such as Tartan-patterned trim, inspired by the interior of Ferry Porsche’s original 911 Turbo, which served as his company car in 1974. This special edition combined modern performance with retro styling cues to honor the legacy of the Turbo model line.

In November 2020, Porsche introduced 911 Turbo S Embraer Duet. It was result of cooperating between Porsche and Embraer, the customers of new Embraer Phenom 300E could also buy a matching customised version of 911 Turbo S. The car is done in Platinum Silver Metallic, although the bottom of the car is painted in Jet Grey Metallic. Between these colors, there is a stripe of Brilliant Chrome and Speed Blue colors. The rims are painted in Platinum Silver Metallic with Speed blue accents. The side air intakes and window trims are done in Brilliant Chrome. Also a special badge which can be found in the interior, was developed for this edition. A similar logo which shows that the car is 1 of 10, can also be found on the B-pillars. The interior features combined black and chalk-colored leather with Speed Blue stitching and has Carbon package as standard. Only 10 cars were ever produced.

In April 2021, Porsche revealed 911 Turbo S China 20th Anniversary Edition, celebrating 20 years of Porsche in China. It was available in Gulf Orange, Rubystar, Mint Green, Viola, and Oslo Blue and had white side sticker with number 20. Also the car had black 5-spoke rims with white accents and body-colored Sport Design package as standard. Production was limited to 20 units (only for China).

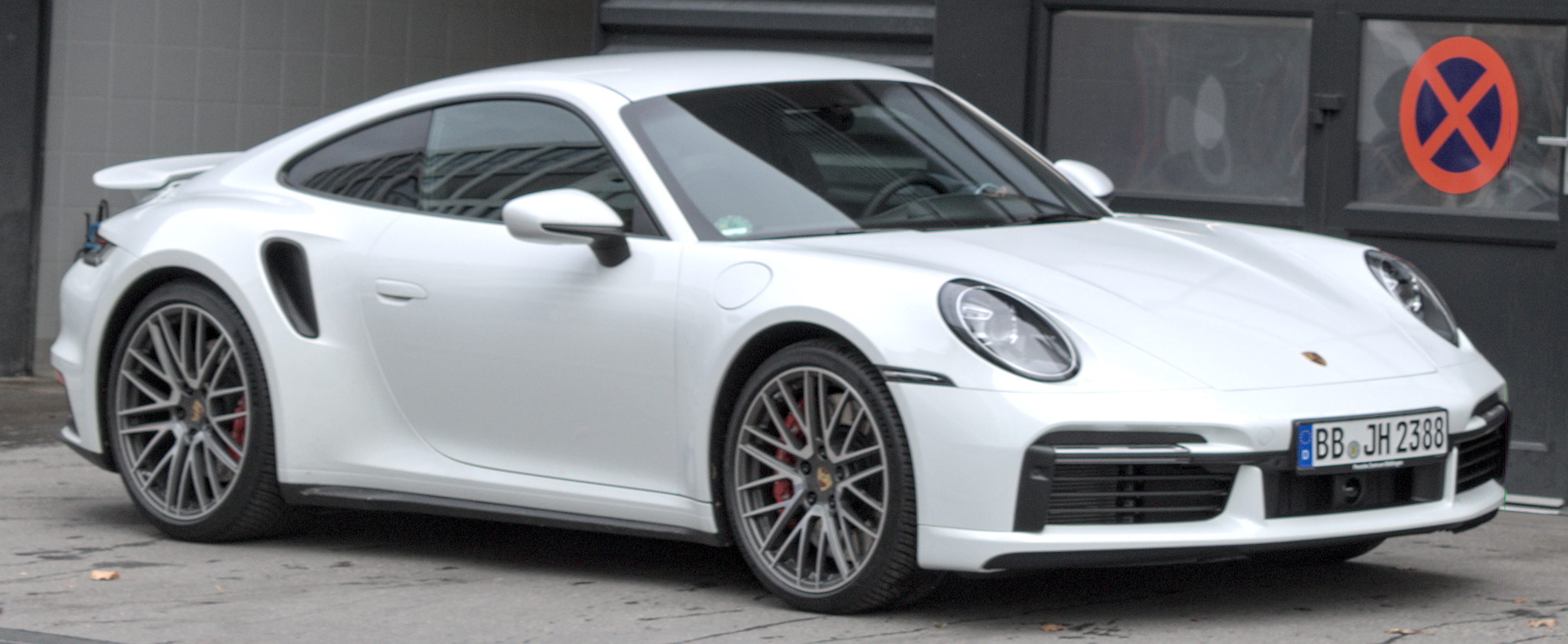
911 Turbo coupé

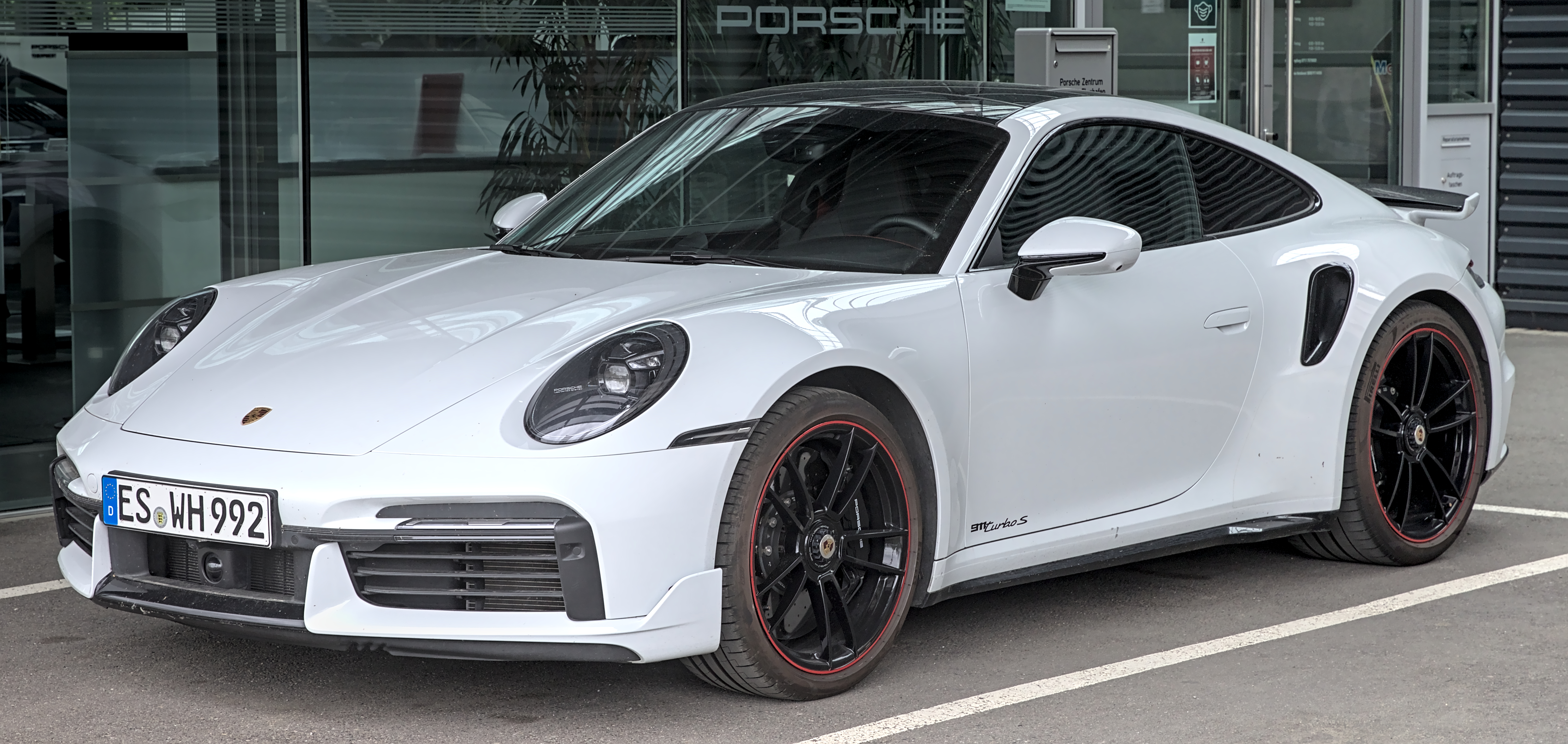
911 Turbo S coupé

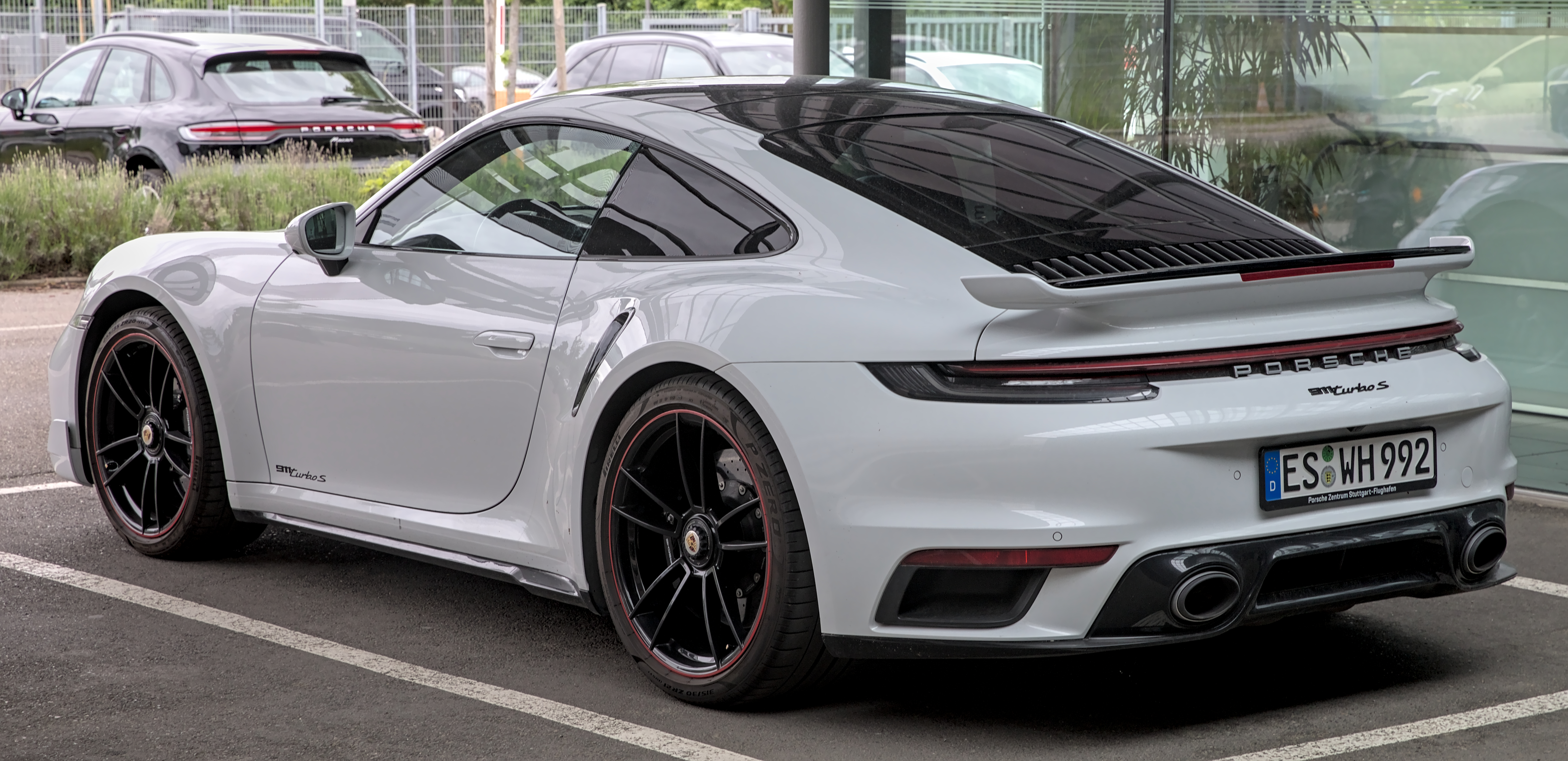
911 Turbo S coupé Rear

=== GT3 and GT3 Touring ===
In February 2021, Porsche introduced the 992's GT3 version. Like most other GT3 Porsches, it is intended for mixed usage with a more track-focused setup. It uses the same 4.0 litre naturally aspirated flat-6 as the 991.2, and producing over 510 PS (375 kW; 503 hp). It reaches 100 km/h (62 mph) in 3.4 seconds while the top speed is 320 km/h (199 mph). The 992 GT3 recently set a lap time at Nürburgring Nordschleife with a time of 6:55.34 minutes.

Unlike the standard model, the GT3 features a large rear spoiler with larger air vents, a bigger diffuser, two large exhaust connections, bucket seats in its interior, and an optional roll cage.

The GT3 uses a 7-speed PDK or a 6-speed manual instead of the 7-speed manual or 8-speed PDK used in other models.

In July 2022, Porsche showed 911 GT3 30 Years Porsche Supercup, celebrating 30 years of Porsche Supercup racing series. This edition was available in eight colors: GT Silver Metallic, Agate Grey Metallic, High Gloss Black, Meteorgreymetallic, Parliamentgreymetallic, Volcanogreymetallic, Grigiogranitometallic and Diamondblackmetallic. Multicoloured pixel mesh was applied to the rear wheel arches, behind the front wheels and behind the hood air outlets. 30 Years Porsche Supercup logo can be found on doors outside, headrests and other places in interior. Interior uses Sport Tex color variant in Black/Aurum combination and cuboid pattern in the same colors on the armrests in the doors. Production numbers are unknown.

In June 2021, to celebrate 70 years of Porsche in Australia Porsche also featured 911 GT3 Touring 70 Years Porsche Australia Edition. The car was painted in Fish Silver Grey Metallic color, which was specially developed for this edition. Rims are done in Darksilver color, with Fish Silver Grey Metallic bordering. On B-pillars there are badges with Australian flag and logotype of the edition. Full bucket seats are done in Graphite Blue with seat inlays in Madraskaro check fabric in Graphite Blue and Crayon. Centre console trim was also painted in Fish Silver Grey Metallic. Just 25 examples were made.

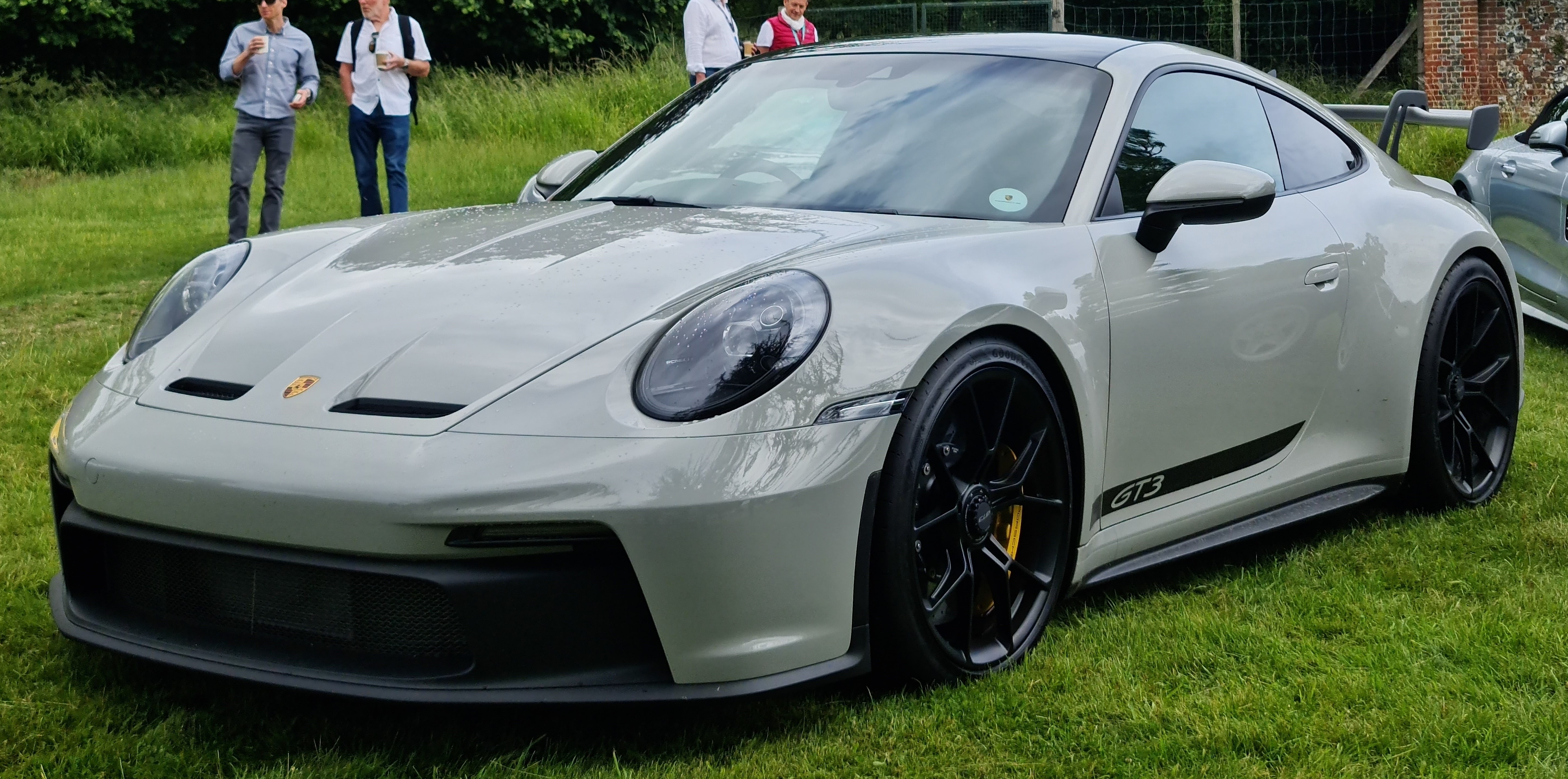
911 GT3

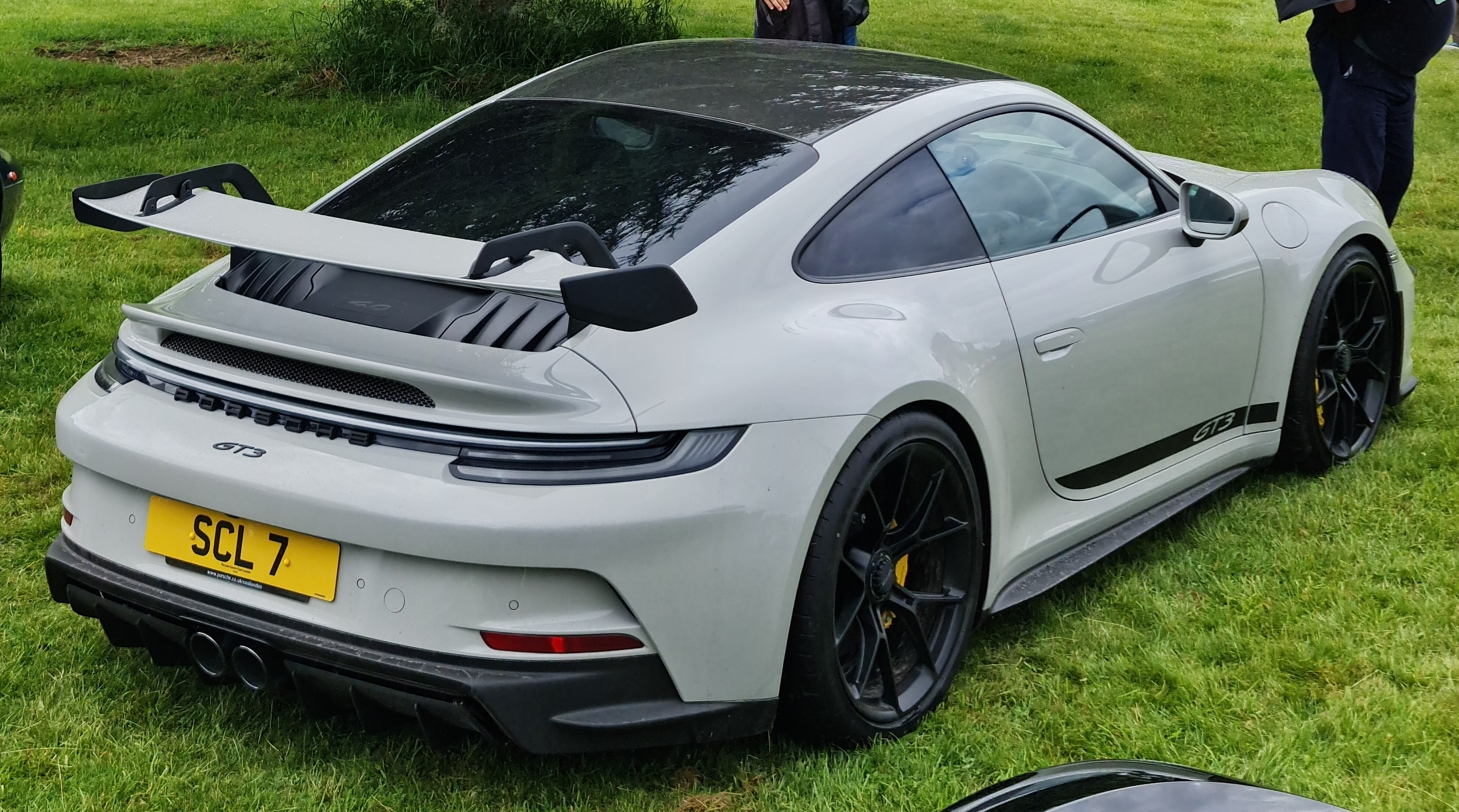
911 GT3 Rear

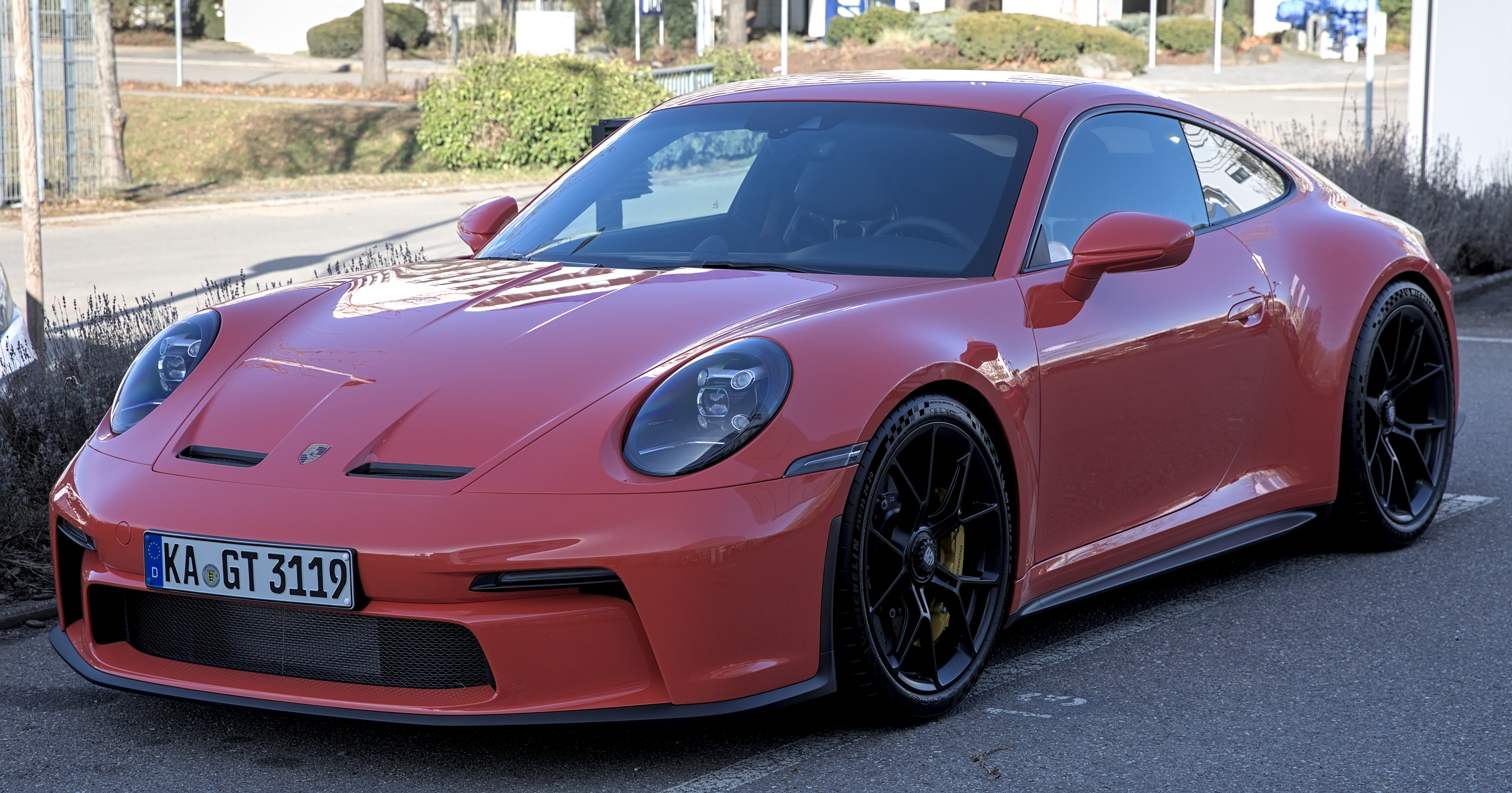
911 GT3 Touring package

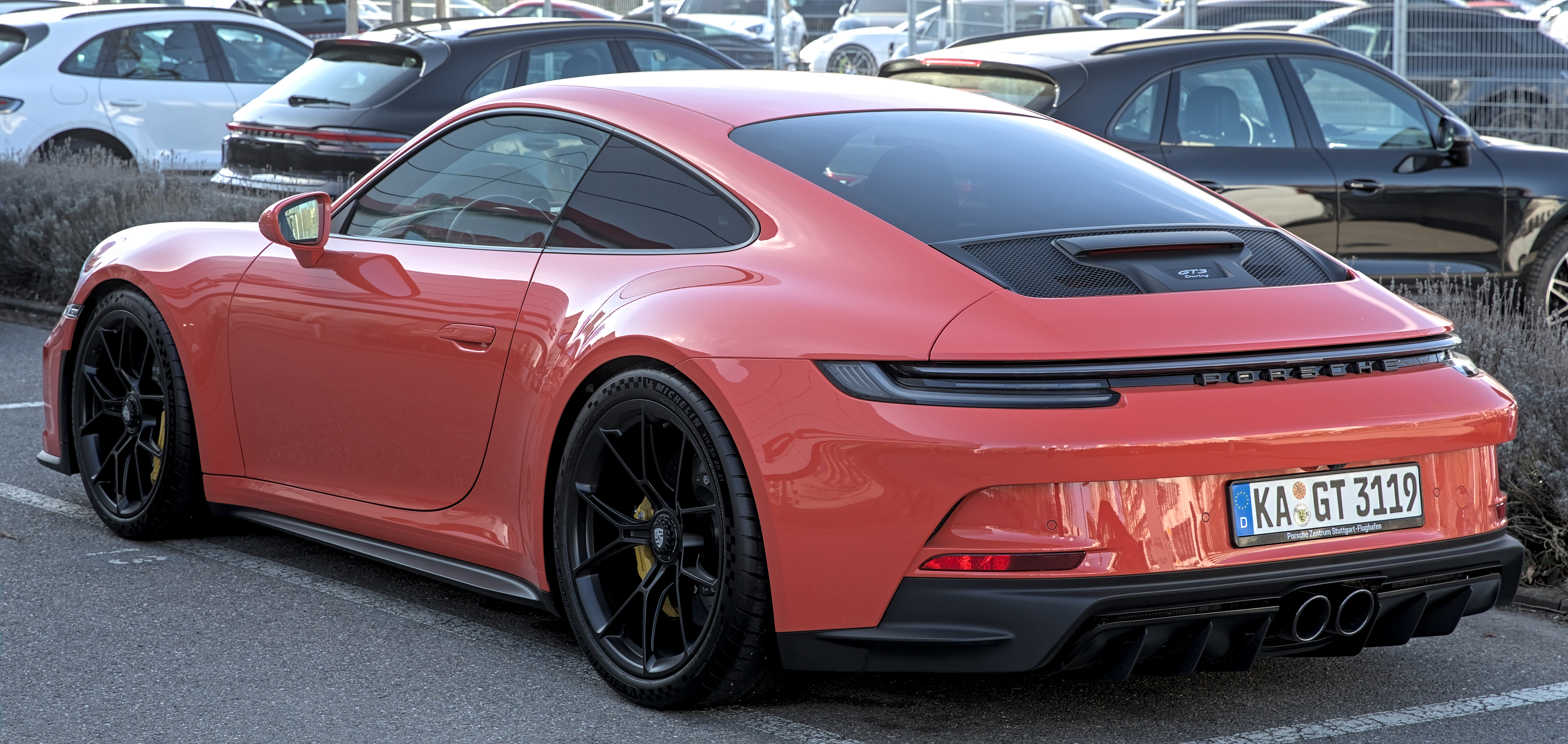
911 GT3 Touring package Rear

=== GT3 RS ===
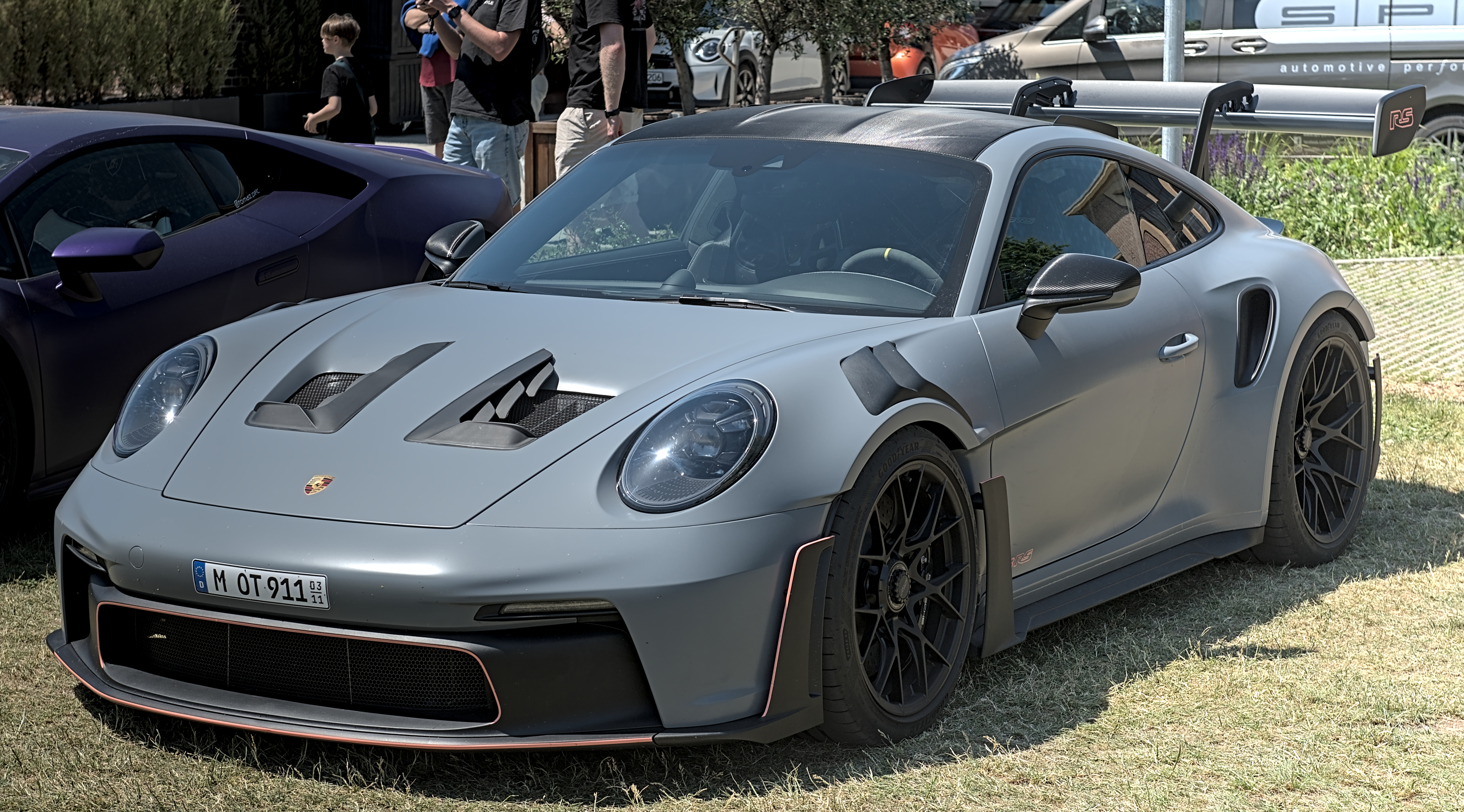
911 GT3 RS

In August 2022, Porsche unveiled the 992 GT3 RS. A further evolution of other GT3 Porsches, it represents the highest track performance of their road-legal 911 lineup. It features a dramatically improved aerodynamic profile compared to the 992 GT3, resulting in 860 kgf (8.4 kN) of downforce at 285 km/h, a two-fold increase over the 991.2 GT3 RS, and 409 kgf (4.01 kN) of downforce at 200 km/h. The rear wing features a static portion and an active portion, which can open and close automatically based on vehicle data, or manually with a button fitted to the steering wheel, inspired by Formula 1's Drag Reduction Systems (DRS).

Its engine produces 386 kilowatts (525 PS) at 8500 rpm and 465 of N⋅m torque at 6300 rpm. The car has a redline of 9000 rpm (same as the GT3 done by its naturally aspirated flat-six engine). The curb weight of the car in European specification is 1450 kg, and it's capable of achieving 100 km/h in 3.2 seconds, and 200 km/h in 10.6 seconds. The top speed stated by Porsche is 296 km/h (184 mph). The GT3 RS set a 20,600m Nürburgring Nordschleife lap time of 6:44:848 minutes and a 20,832m lap time of 6:49:328 minutes.

In February 2023, Porsche revealed 911 GT3 RS Carrera RS Tribute Edition. This edition is a tribute to 1973 911 Carrera RS 2.7. The car has white exterior with Python Green rims, decals and badges. Behind the RS badges on the rear wing, there is a tiny green American flag. The interior is also stitched in Python Green. These were only made for US market, 150 units were produced.

=== Sport Classic ===
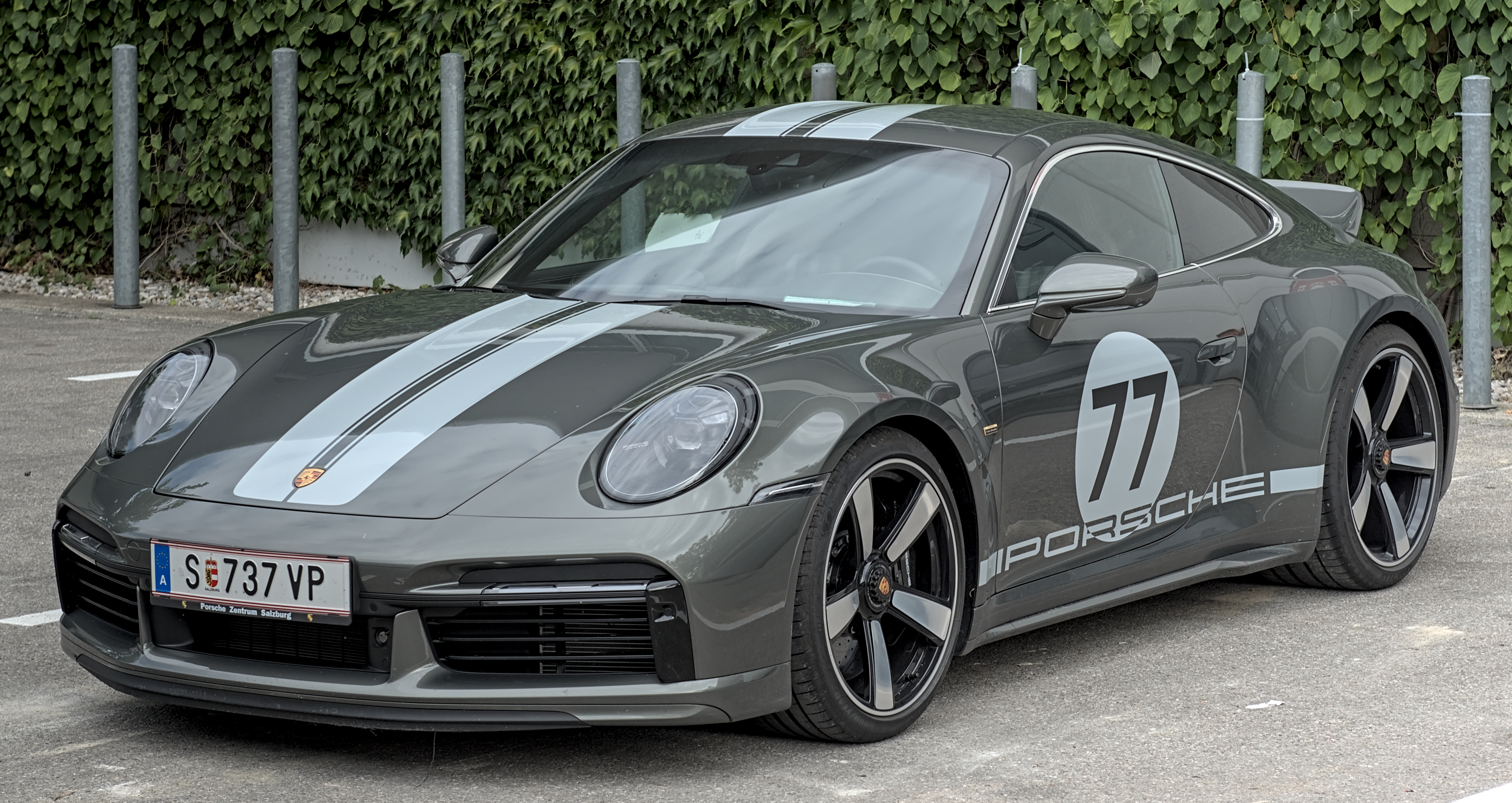
911 Sport Classic

In April 2022, Porsche revealed the 911 Sport Classic. The car is based on a Turbo but can only be equipped with RWD (instead of AWD) and only offers a 7-speed manual transmission (which is not an option on Turbo models).

The 3,745 cc (3.7 L) twin-turbocharged flat-six engine makes 550 PS (542 hp; 405 kW) of power and 600 N⋅m (443 lb⋅ft) of torque. This is 30 PS (30 hp; 22 kW) and 150 N⋅m (111 lb⋅ft) less than in the Turbo. Porsche had to de-tune the engine as the manual transmission couldn't handle the power and torque of the engine found in the Turbo. At the time of its reveal, the Sport Classic is the most powerful 992 with a manual transmission, followed by the manual GT3.

Porsche had to slightly decrease the front spring rates because the car does not have all-wheel drive. Visually, the car shares the same wide body found on Turbo models but doesn't have intakes in the rear fenders. Instead, the Sport Classic has ducts integrated into its ducktail spoiler. The hood is made of carbon fiber and all the active aero found on the Turbo have been removed.

The worldwide production will be limited to 1,250 units. The last time Porsche had sold a Sport Classic car was with the 997 generation, which was based on a Carrera GTS and for which the worldwide production was limited to only 250 units.

=== 911 Dakar ===
In November 2022, Porsche launched the 911 Dakar, a specialized off-road variant of the 992, at the Los Angeles Auto Show. Building on the heritage of rally models such as the 953 and 959, the model pays homage to Porsche models which famously raced and won in the Dakar Rally, hence the model's name.

The 911 Dakar features a longer travel suspension which is 50 mm (2.0 in) taller than a standard 911, and which can also be raised an additional 30 mm (1.2 in) by the lift system, resulting in a total of 191 mm (7.5 in) ground clearance. The model comes fitted with specialized Pirelli Scorpion All Terrain Plus tires, sizes 245/45 ZR 19 at the front and 295/40 ZR 20 at the rear. The model makes use of the same 3.0-litre flat-6 engine found in the 911 GTS, making 480 PS (473 hp; 353 kW) and 569 N⋅m (420 lb⋅ft) of torque from 2,300 to 5,000 rpm. It has a top-speed of 149 mph (240 km/h) and can accelerate to 100 km/h (62 mph) in 3.4 seconds.

It is exclusively all-wheel drive and is only available with an 8-speed automatic transmission. Porsche has also limited production to 2,500 units.

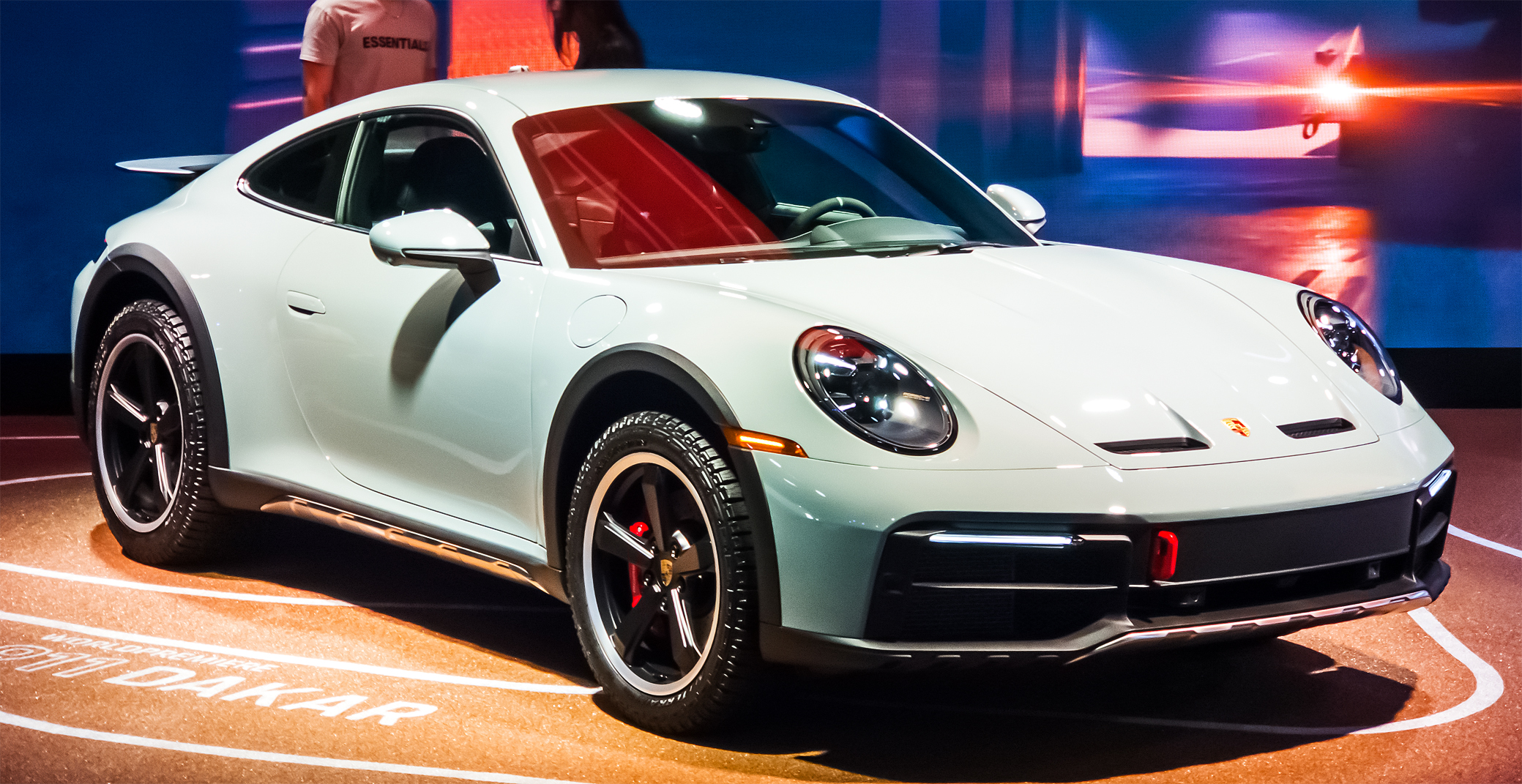
911 Dakar at the 2022 LA Auto Show

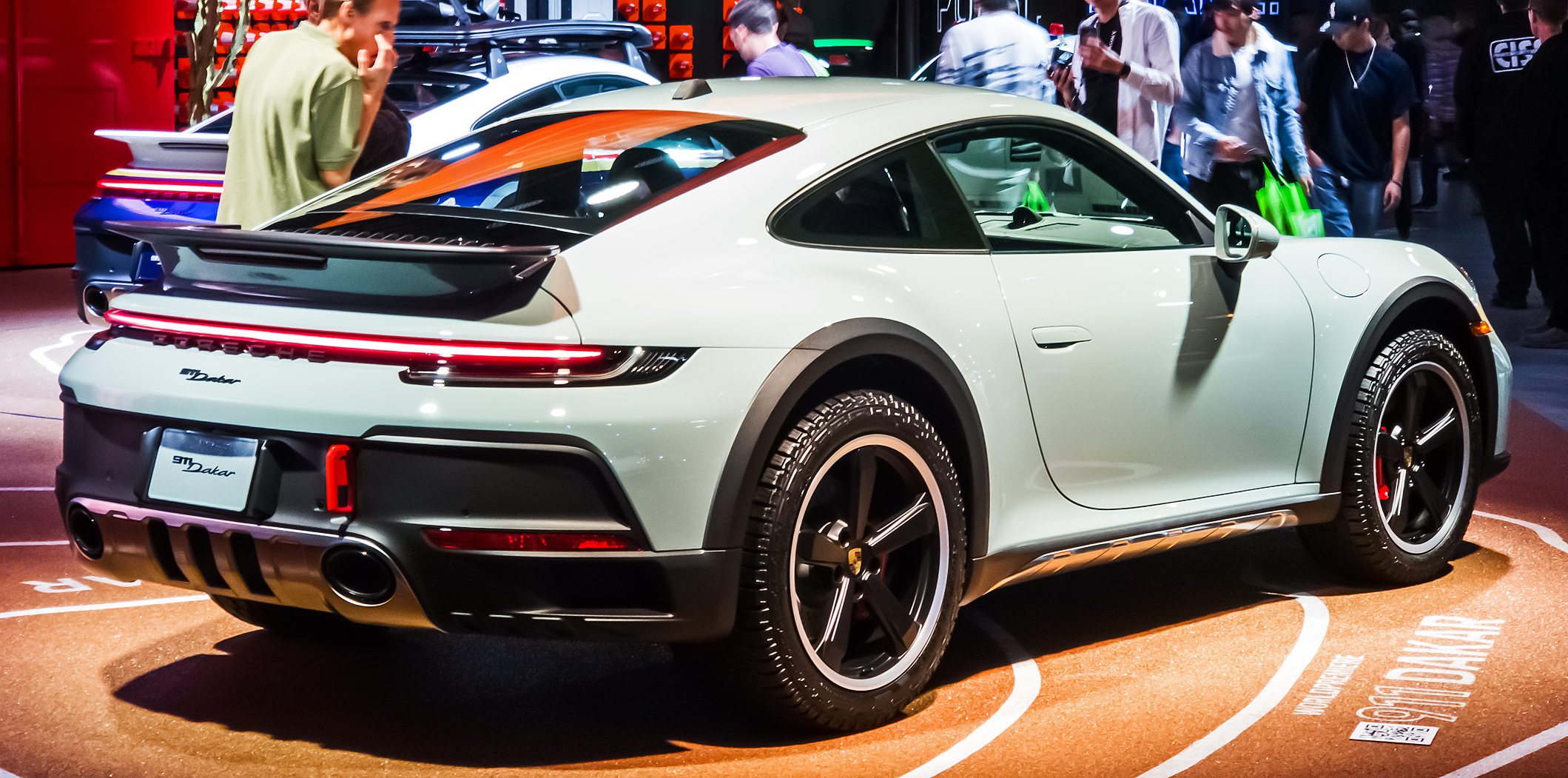
Rear view

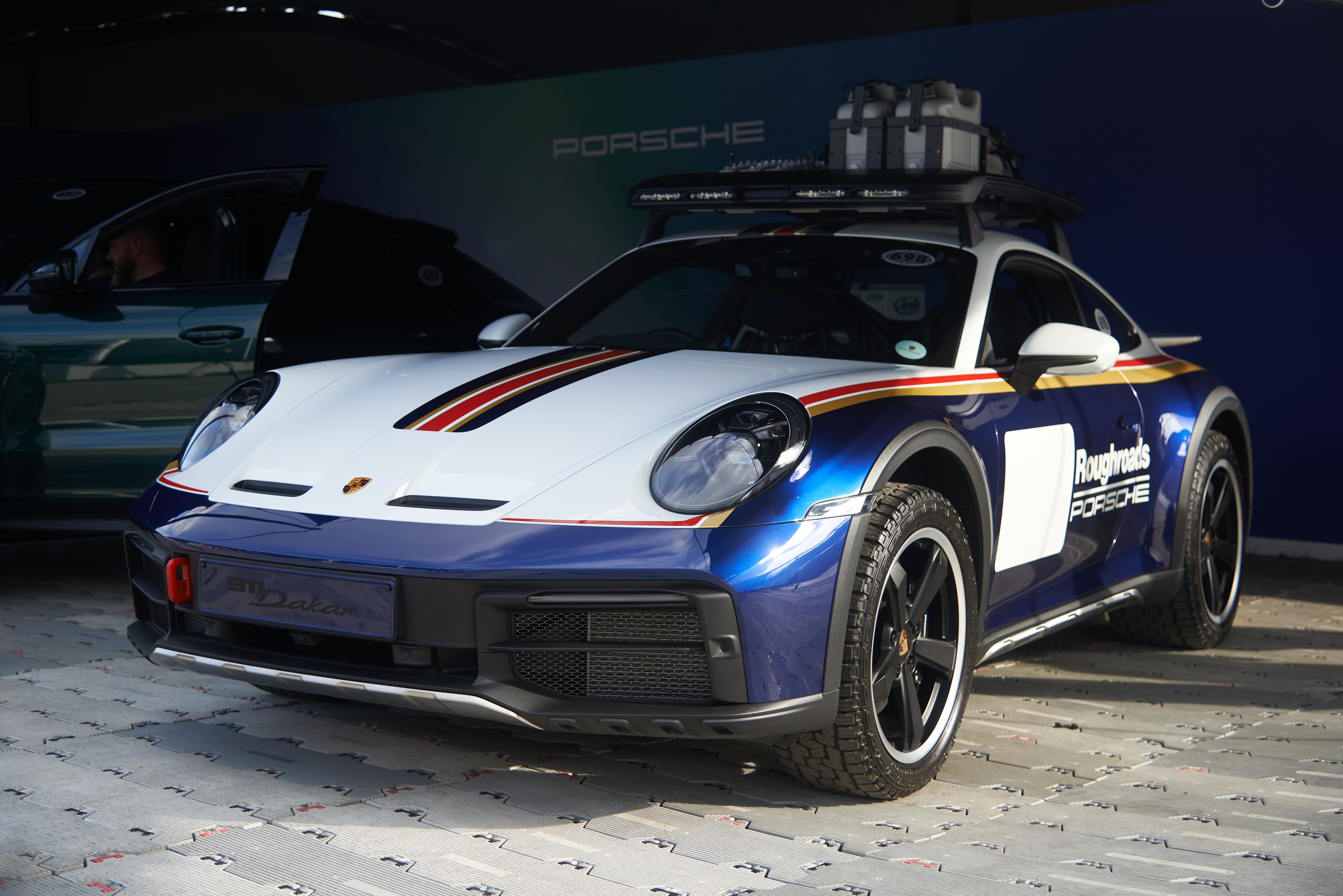
911 Dakar at the Goodwood Festival of Speed 2023

=== 911 S/T ===
In August 2023, Porsche revealed the 911 S/T to celebrate that particular model’s 60th anniversary. This version uses various parts pulled from other Porsche models, the engine being the same as what is found in the GT3 RS, and a similar body to the GT3 Touring but featuring S/T-specific carbon fenders, carbon doors, and "double-bubble" roof from the GT3 RS. Similarly to the GT3, it is offered with a six-speed manual transmission, but an automatic transmission or PDK is currently not an option (unlike the GT3 RS). Only 1,963 units will be built, and it is intended for a 2024 release.

The 911 S/T's naturally aspirated 4.0-litre flat-6 engine makes 525 PS (518 hp; 386 kW) and a total of 465 N⋅m (343 lb⋅ft) of torque at 6,300 rpm. It is also the lightest Porsche in the 992 generation at 1,404 kilograms (3,095 lb), and can accelerate to 100 km/h (62 mph) in 3.7 seconds. It is rear-wheel drive, and has a top speed of 299 km/h (186 mph).

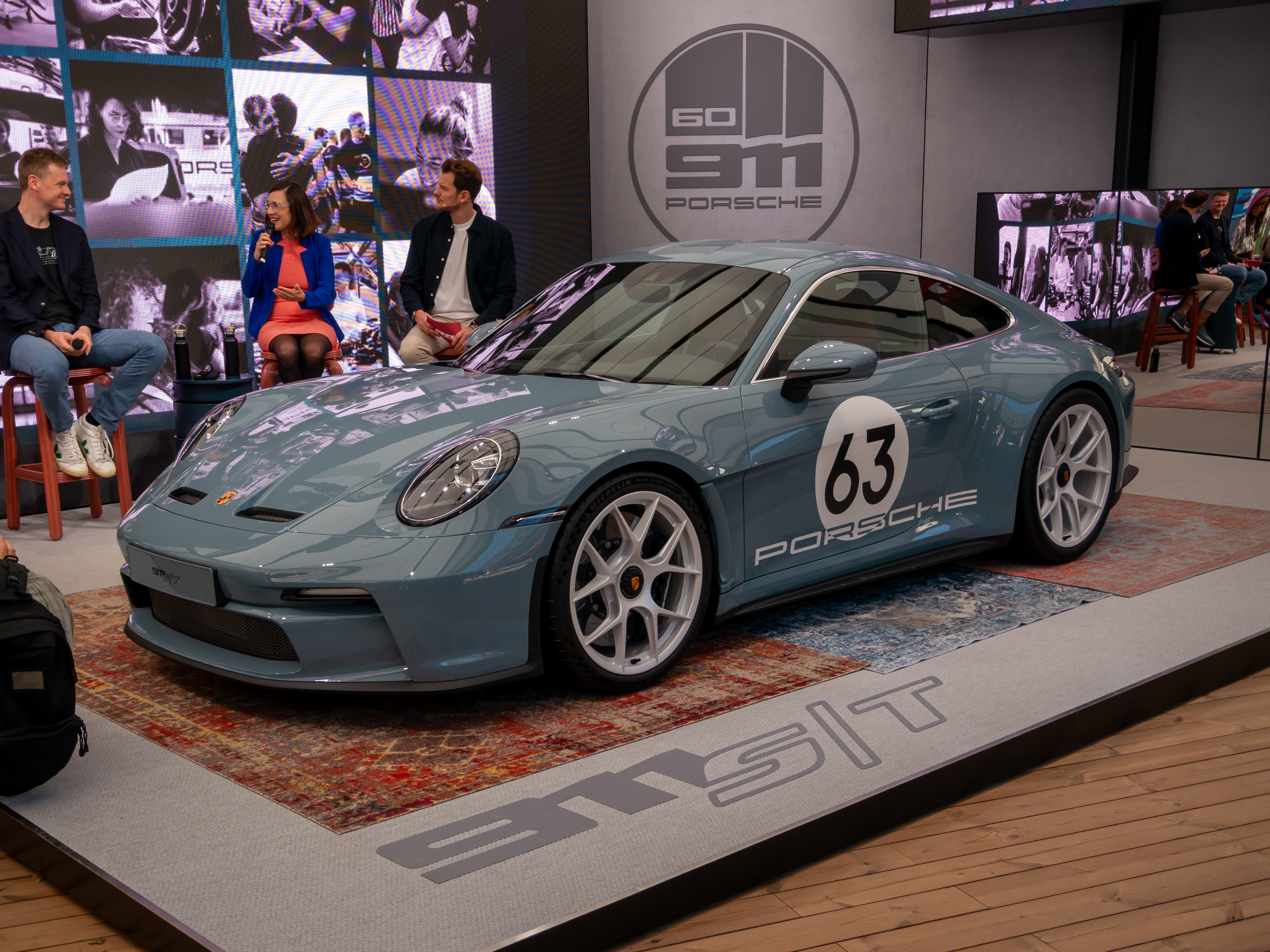
911 S/T at IAA Munich in 2023

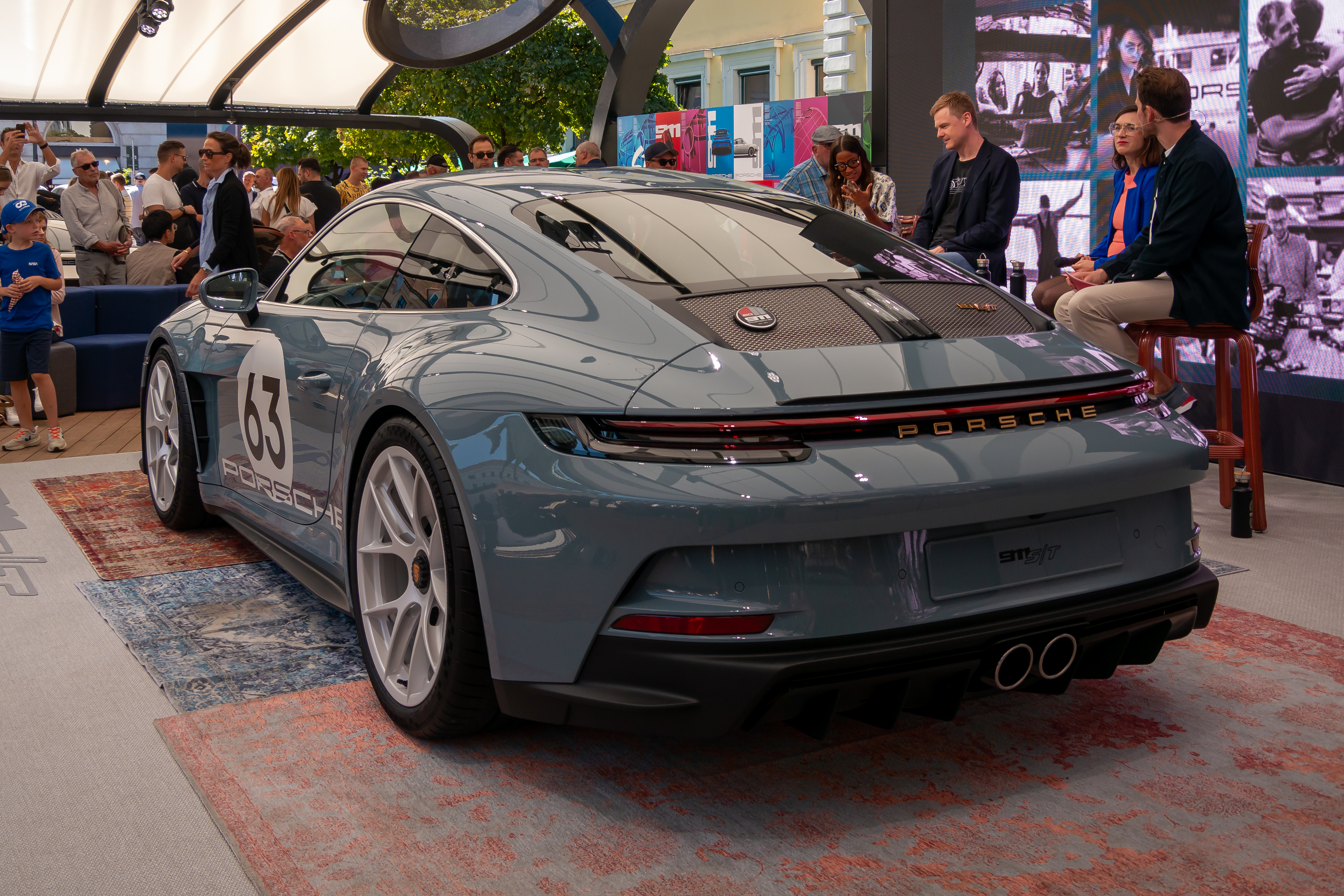
Rear view

== Second Phase (992.2) ==
=== Carrera, Carrera 4, Targa 4, Carrera S, Carrera 4S and Targa 4S ===
The 992 received a refresh for the 2025 model year, and launched on May 28, 2024 with the Carrera and Carrera GTS models, in both coupe and cabriolet variants. At launch, the Carrera was not offered with all-wheel drive or a manual transmission, and utilized a 3.0 L (2,981 cc) twin-turbocharged flat-six engine and 8-speed PDK (see dual-clutch transmission) that was found in the 992.1 Carrera. The engine is rated for 394 PS (389 hp; 290 kW) and 450 N⋅m (332 lb⋅ft) of torque, allowing it to accelerate from 0–97 km/h (0–60 mph) in 3.9 seconds (3.7 seconds with the Sport Chrono Package). It has a top speed of 295 km/h (183 mph).

The Carrera Cabriolet has a top speed of 292 km/h (181 mph), slightly lower than the coupe, and accelerates from 0–97 km/h (0–60 mph) in 4.1 seconds.

The Carrera S was shown in January 2025. Its 3.0 L, flat-six engine is rated for a total of 473 hp (480 PS; 353 kW) and 530 N⋅m (391 lb⋅ft) of torque. With this, it can accelerate from 0–100 km/h (0–62 mph) in 3.3 seconds with the Sport Chrono Package (3.5 without the Sport Chrono Package) and reach a maximum speed of 308 km/h. The 992.1 Carrera S Cabriolet possessed the same power unit, but nevertheless required 3.5 seconds with Sport Chrono Package (and 3.7s without it) to reach 100 km/h.

In July 2025, Porsche revealed the all-wheel drive 911 4S. It uses the same power unit as Carrera S in the above section, and has the same performance specifications.

Just as with Carrera 4S, the Targa 4S was also introduced by Porsche in July 2025. It shares its performance specifications with the Carrera S.

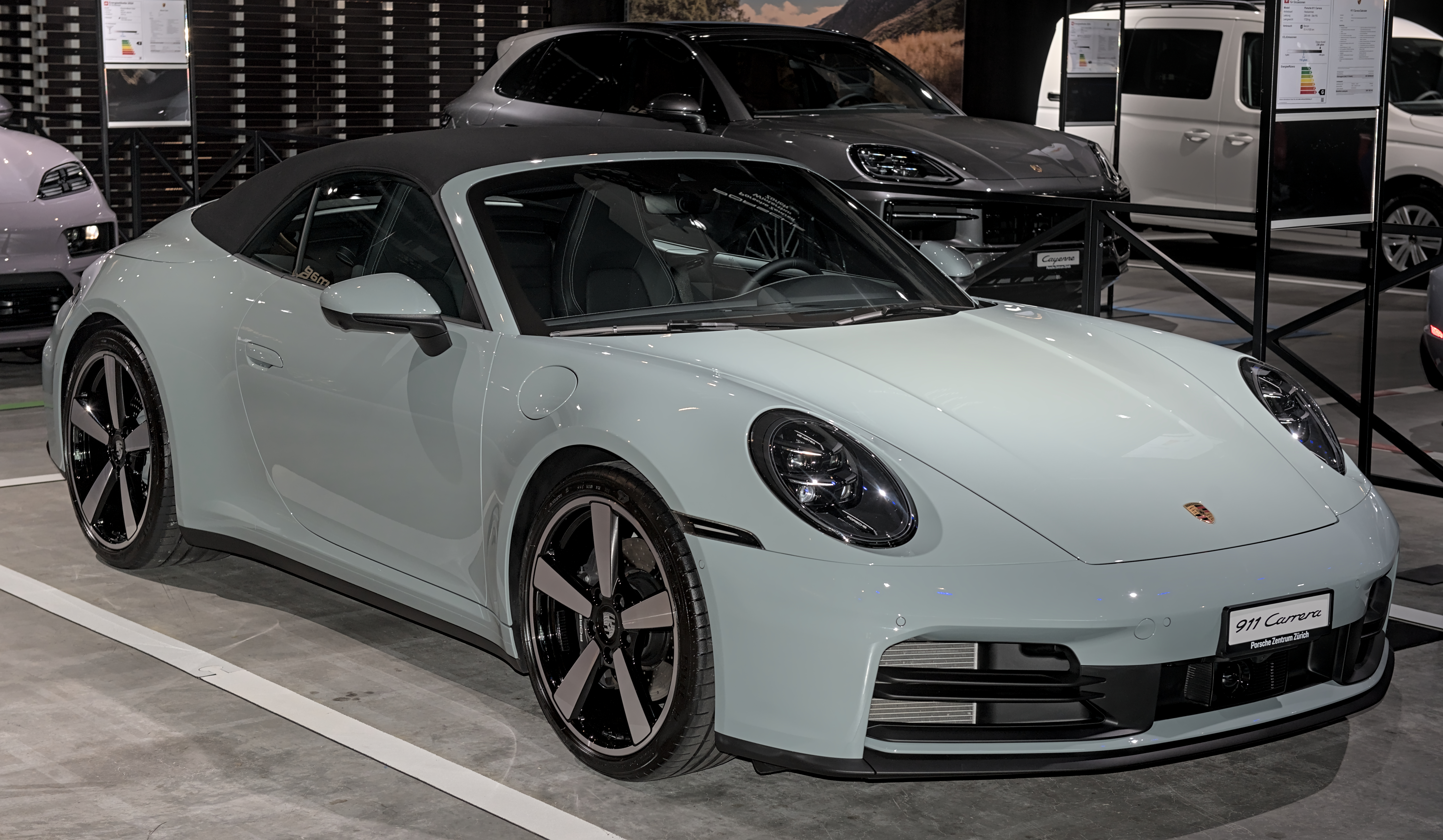
911 Carrera Cabriolet

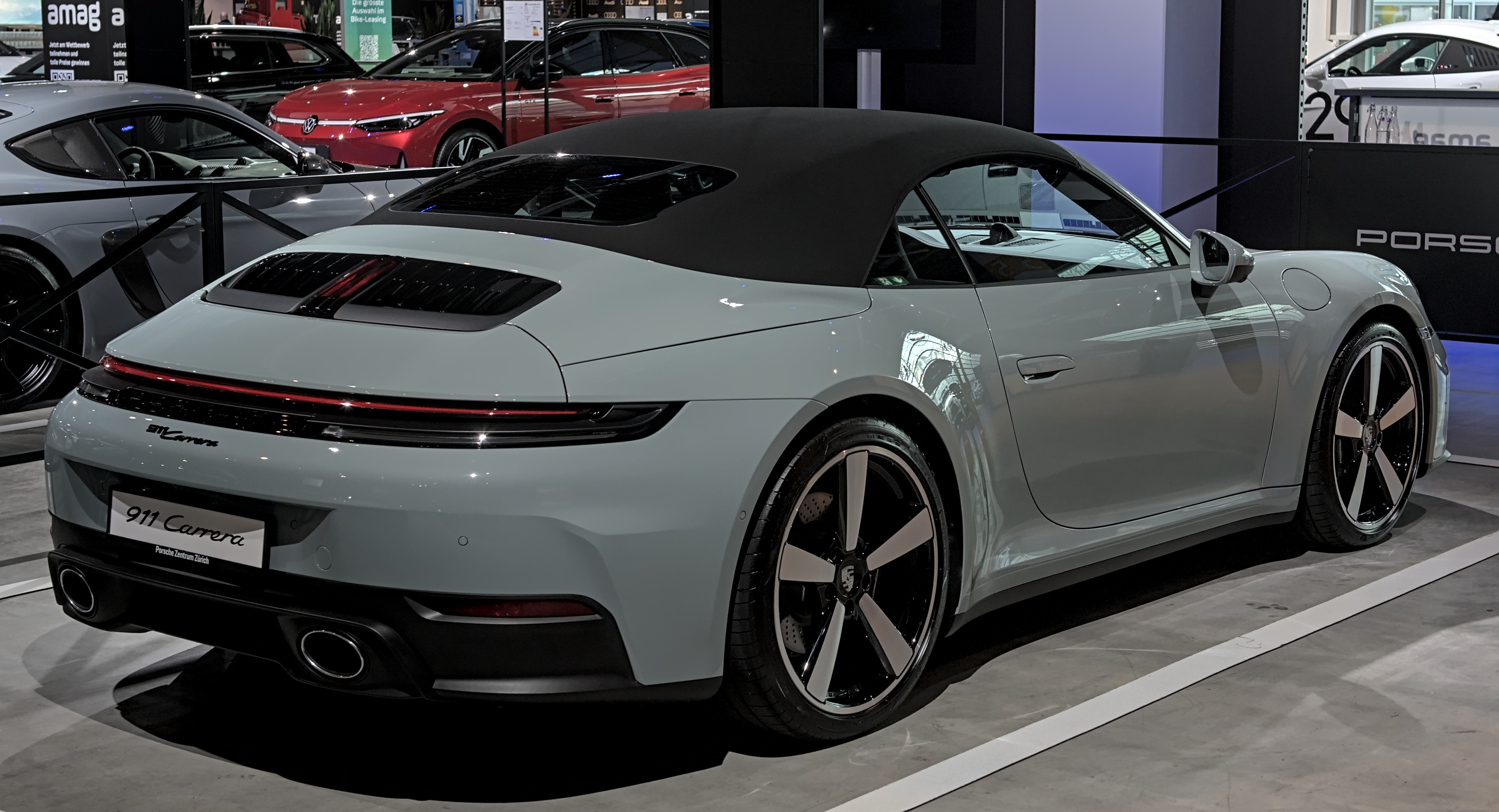
Rear view

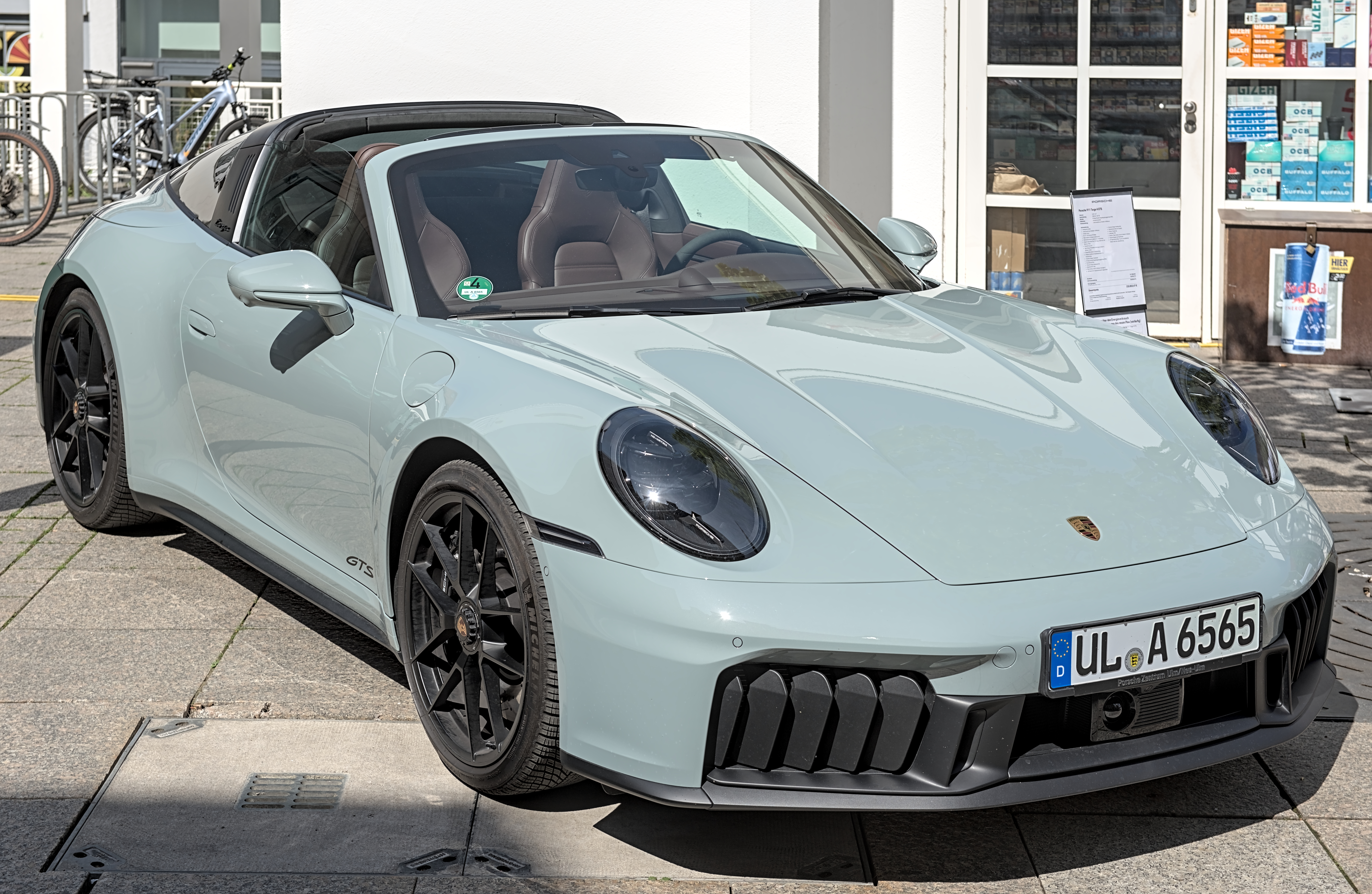
911 Carrera GTS Targa

=== Carrera GTS T-Hybrid ===
The 992.2 Carrera GTS T-Hybrid is the first hybrid electric versions of the 911 model line to go into full-scale production. It was officially revealed on May 28, 2024 and production began in June 2024. It is available with coupé, cabriolet, and targa body styles, and with rear-wheel drive or all-wheel drive (Carrera 4 GTS T-Hybrid).

The newly engineered 3.6 L (3,591 cc) turbocharged flat-six engine, which has been upsized in comparison to the last model's 3.0 L six-cylinder, makes 541 PS (534 hp; 398 kW) and 569 N⋅m (420 ft⋅lb) of torque. The battery has a capacity of approximately 1.9 kWh. It has an all-new eight-speed dual-clutch transmission (PDK), which is designed to increase power output in conjunction with the new engine and hybrid drivetrain.

The Carrera GTS and GTS Cabriolet will accelerate from 0–100 km/h (0–62 mph) in 3.0 seconds, and have a top speed of approximately 312 km/h (194 mph). The Carrera GTS Cabriolet and Targa models have a marginally reduced 0–97 km/h (0–60 mph) time of 3.1 seconds, and all three are slightly heavier than the standard Carrera/Carrera 4 GTS.

During testing, the Carrera GTS set a lap time of 7:16.931 minutes at the Nürburgring Nordschleife, which is, compared to its predecessor, an improvement of roughly 8.7 seconds, despite it being 47 kg (104 lb) heavier.

In April 2025, Porsche unveiled the 911 Spirit 70. It was based on 992.2 Carrera GTS Cabriolet and has the same performance. Created with Heritage Design strategy it features exterior painted in Olive Neo color. The 5-spoke rims, bottom of the rear bumper, front bumper's lip are painted in grey-gold color. The cabriolet top and windshield frame are black. It also has black side decals with "70" number and Porsche lettering. It also has the stripes with the number 911 on the hood. The interior was finished in the iconic Pasha fabric pattern in black/olive neo. The graphic design of the fabric is reminiscent of a chequered flag. 1,500 units will be produced.

In August 2025, Porsche delivered the first example of the 911 Carrera 4 GTS "Tribute to Transfăgărășan", a Sonderwunsch special edition based on the 992.2 Carrera 4 GTS Coupé and sharing its T-Hybrid performance. The model was created to celebrate 50 years of the Transfăgărășan, the Romanian mountain highway crossing the Făgăraș range, whose anniversary in 2024 coincided with the 50th anniversary of the 911 Turbo. Only 10 units will be built, each individually configured by its owner together with the Porsche Sonderwunsch and Style Porsche teams in Zuffenhausen.

=== GT3, GT3 Touring and GT3 S/C ===
The GT3 and GT3 Touring, refreshed for the 992.2 generation, were revealed by Porsche on October 18, 2024. Both have retained the 4.0 L (3,996 cc), naturally aspirated flat-6 engine, rated for the same 510 PS (375 kW; 503 hp) as the 992.1. In addition, the engine makes 450 N·m (332 ft·lb) of torque, and allows the vehicle to accelerate from 0 to 100 km/h (0–62 mph) in 3.4 seconds. However, this is increased to 3.9 seconds when the six-speed manual transmission is used in lieu of the dual-clutch transmission (PDK). The top speed of the GT3 and GT3 Touring are lower than what is observed in the 992.1, with a top speed of 311 and 313 km/h (193 mph / 194 mph) for the GT3 and Touring models, respectively.

The GT3 and GT3 Touring were sold with a six-speed manual transmission or PDK as options. In contrast to the Carrera line of models, the ignition key is kept within the vehicle, while the lower-end options retain the use of a button. Moreover, the GT3 may be optioned out with the Weissach package originally found in the GT3 RS, as well as a Clubsport package that can be purchased free-of-charge.

The GT3 S/C, the open-top cabriolet variant of the 992.2 GT3, was introduced by Porsche as a 2027 model. It retains the same 4.0 L (3,996 cc) naturally aspirated flat-6 engine as the GT3, rated at 510 PS (375 kW; 503 hp) and 450 N·m (332 ft·lb) of torque, with a 9,000 rpm redline. It accelerates from 0 to 100 km/h (0–62 mph) in 3.9 seconds and reaches a top speed of 313 km/h (194 mph). The DIN kerb weight is 1,497 kg.

Unlike the GT3, the GT3 S/C is offered exclusively with a six-speed GT Sport manual transmission, which is approximately 17 kg lighter than the PDK. Lightweight construction is emphasised, with the rear anti-roll bar, connecting links and thrust panel made of CFRP, and 20/21-inch GT3 forged magnesium wheels fitted as standard alongside Porsche Ceramic Composite Brakes (PCCB). Optional equipment includes a Carbon exterior package, folding lightweight CFRP sports bucket seats, and a Street Style package by Porsche Exclusive Manufaktur featuring a Slate Grey Neo exterior with Pyro Red accents and a two-tone Slate Grey/Guards Red leather interior.

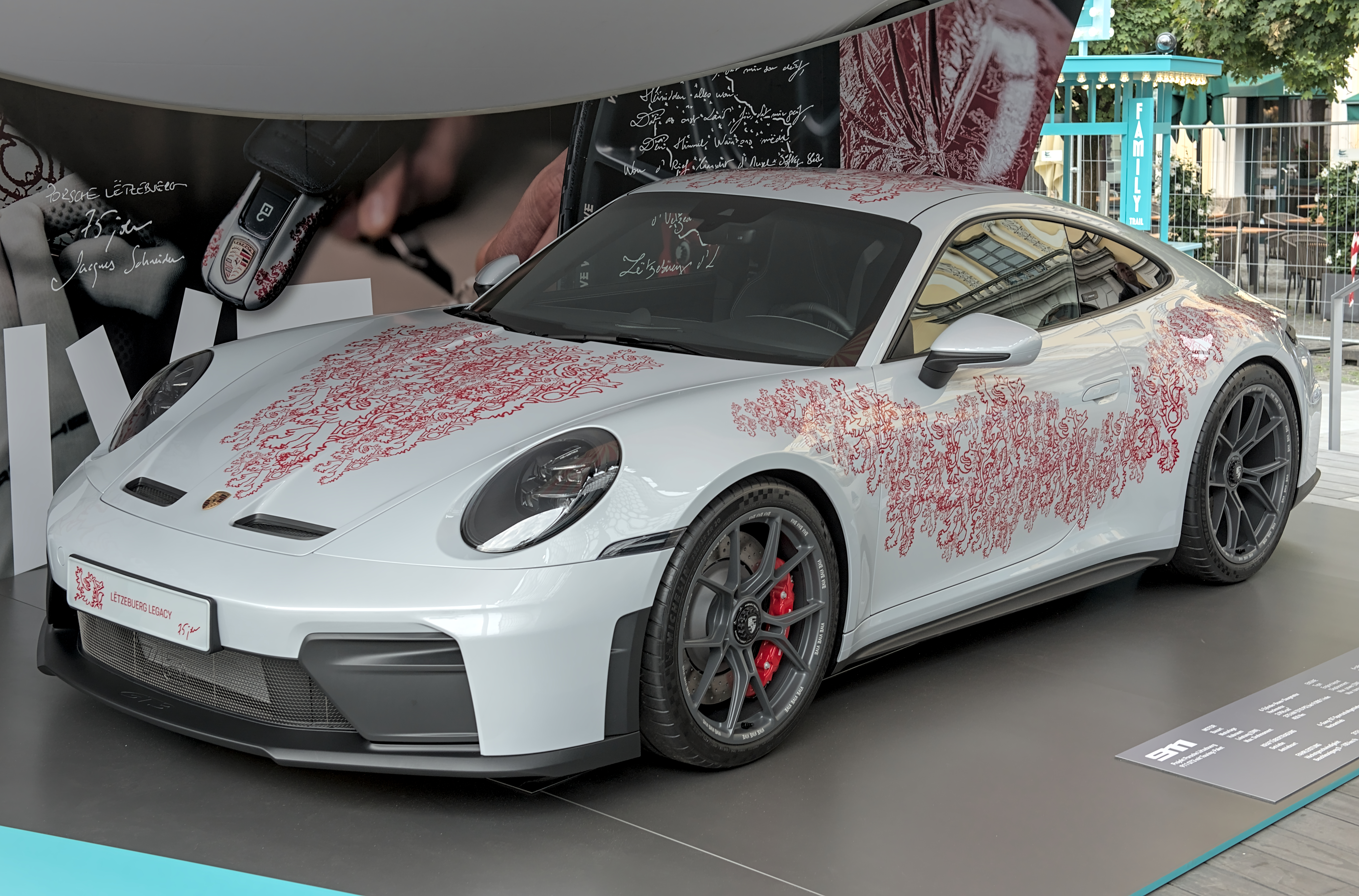
911 GT3

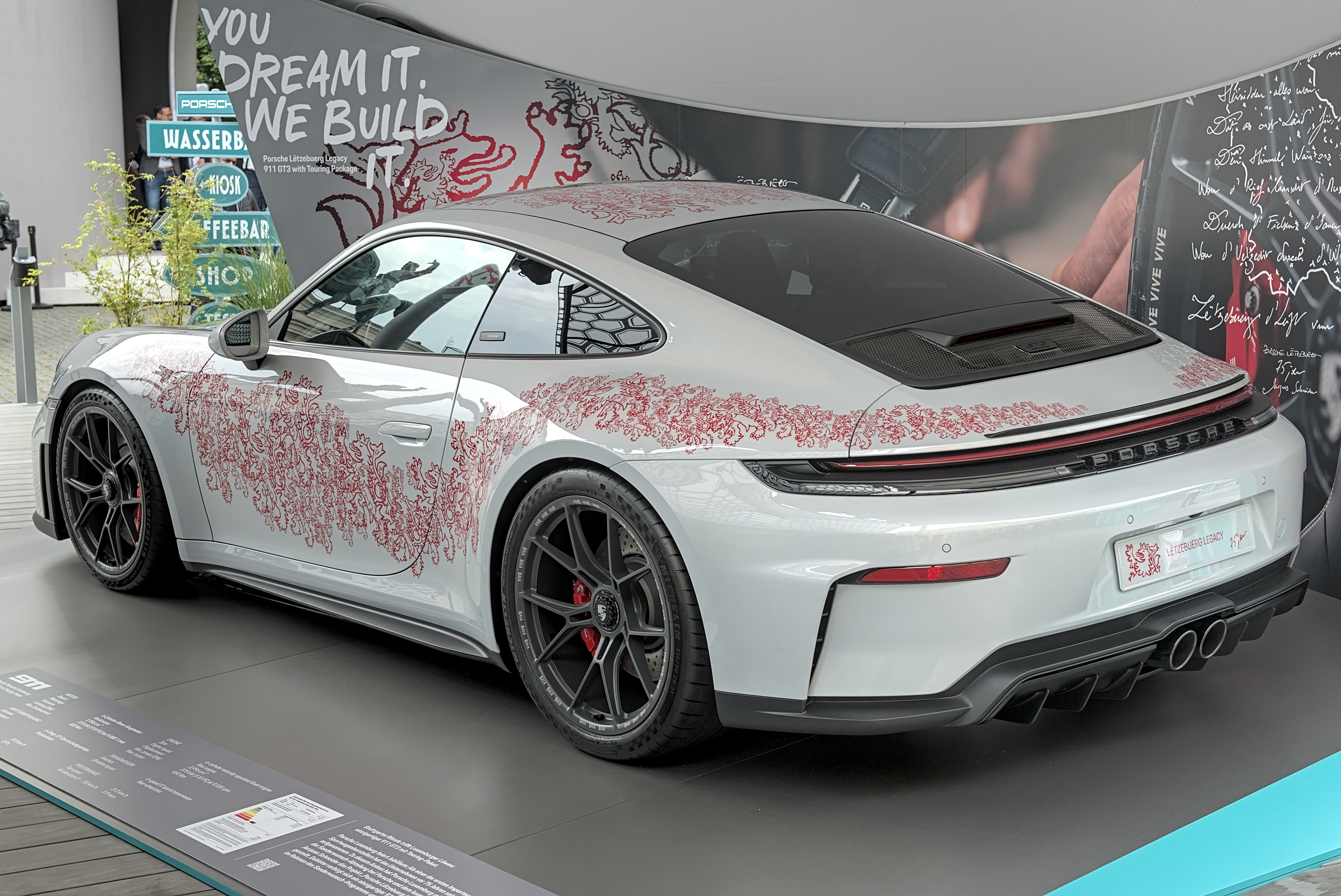
Rear view

=== Turbo S ===
The Turbo S received a refresh for the 2026 model year in the form of the 992.2, and was introduced by Porsche at the 2025 Munich Auto Show. This new iteration of the Turbo S, much like the Carrera GTS that was introduced in the previous year, utilizes a hybrid drivetrain, making it the most powerful 911 that Porsche has ever mass-produced. (Note: Both the Porsche Taycan Turbo S and Taycan Turbo GT are more powerful vehicles by a considerable margin, placing the 911 Turbo S in third place.) Specifically, according to Porsche, the vehicle is rated for a maximum of 711 PS (701 bhp; 523 kW)––approximately 61 PS (60 bhp; 45 kW) more than its fully gas-powered predecessor in the 992.1 generation––and a maximum of 800 Nm (590 ft·lb) of torque from 2,300 to 6,000 rpm. The Turbo S produces this using a twin-turbocharged, 3.6 L flat-six engine, derived from the 3.6 L engine of a similar architecture used in the Carrera GTS for this generation. This engine is linked to an 8-speed PDK (see dual clutch transmission), a feature that is characteristic of other hybrid models within Porsche's lineup.

The Turbo S uses eTurbo turbochargers to reduce turbo lag. The 0–100 km/h (0–62 mph) time is 2.5 seconds (Note: As with all Porsche models, this was achieved with the use of summer tires.) for the coupé model, an increase relative to the previous sub-generation. Despite the hybrid drivetrain adding a total of 85 kg (189 lbs.) to the vehicle, it achieved a lap time at the Nürburgring Nordschleife of 7:03.92 minutes and a top speed of 322 km/h (200 mph). This is 14 seconds faster than its non-hybrid predecessor from the 992.1 generation.

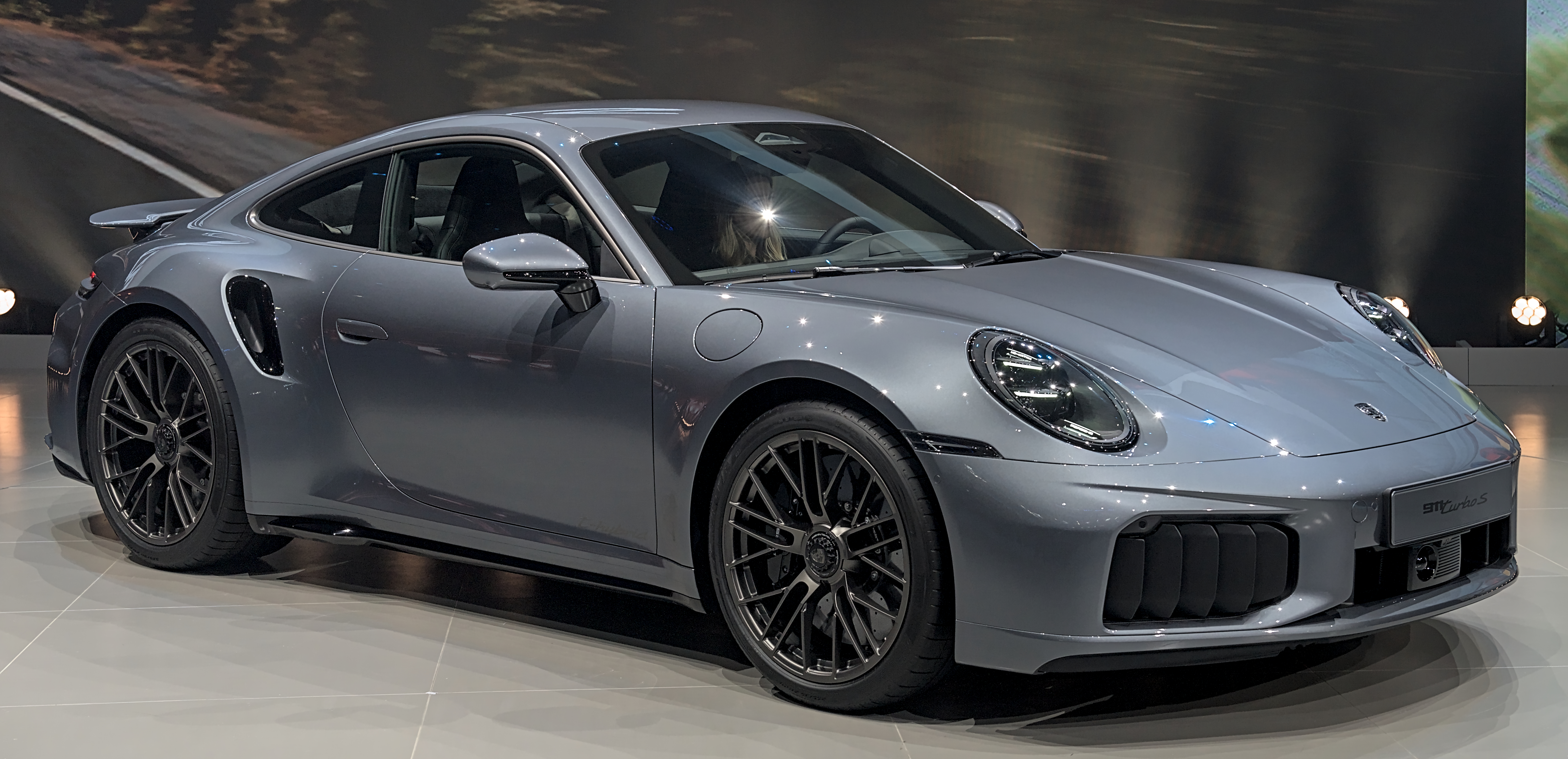
911 Turbo S coupé

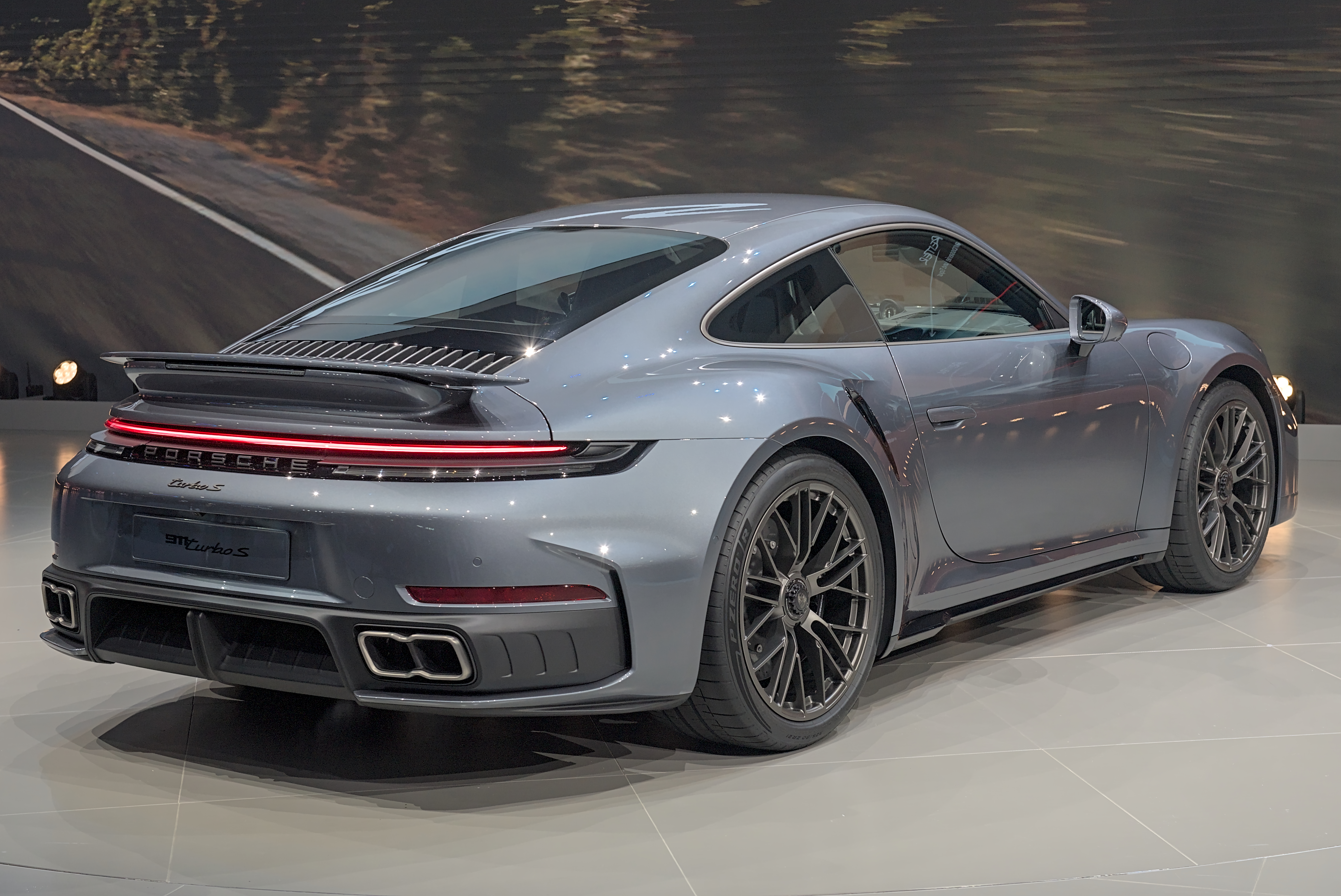
Rear view

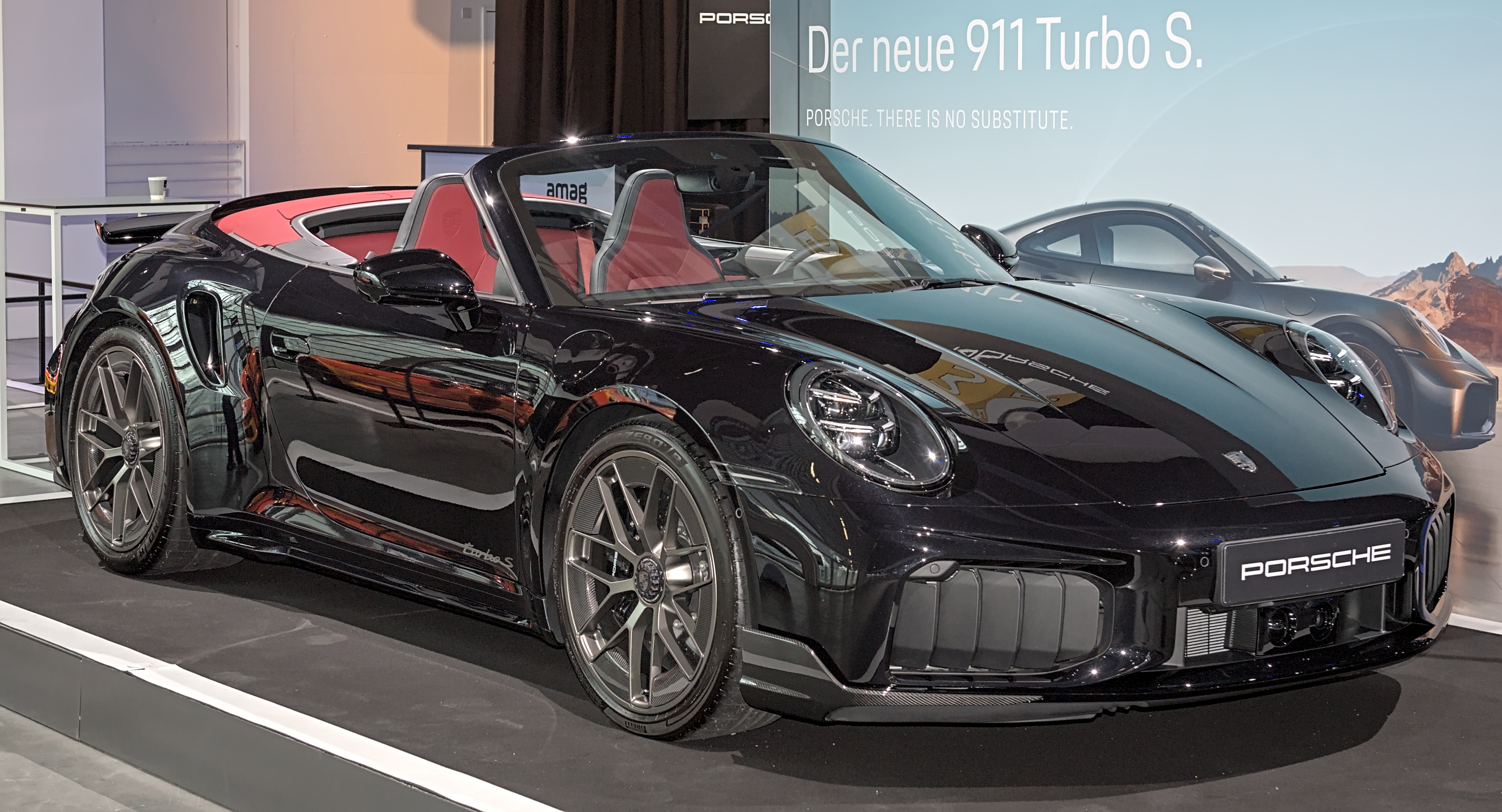
911 Turbo S convertible

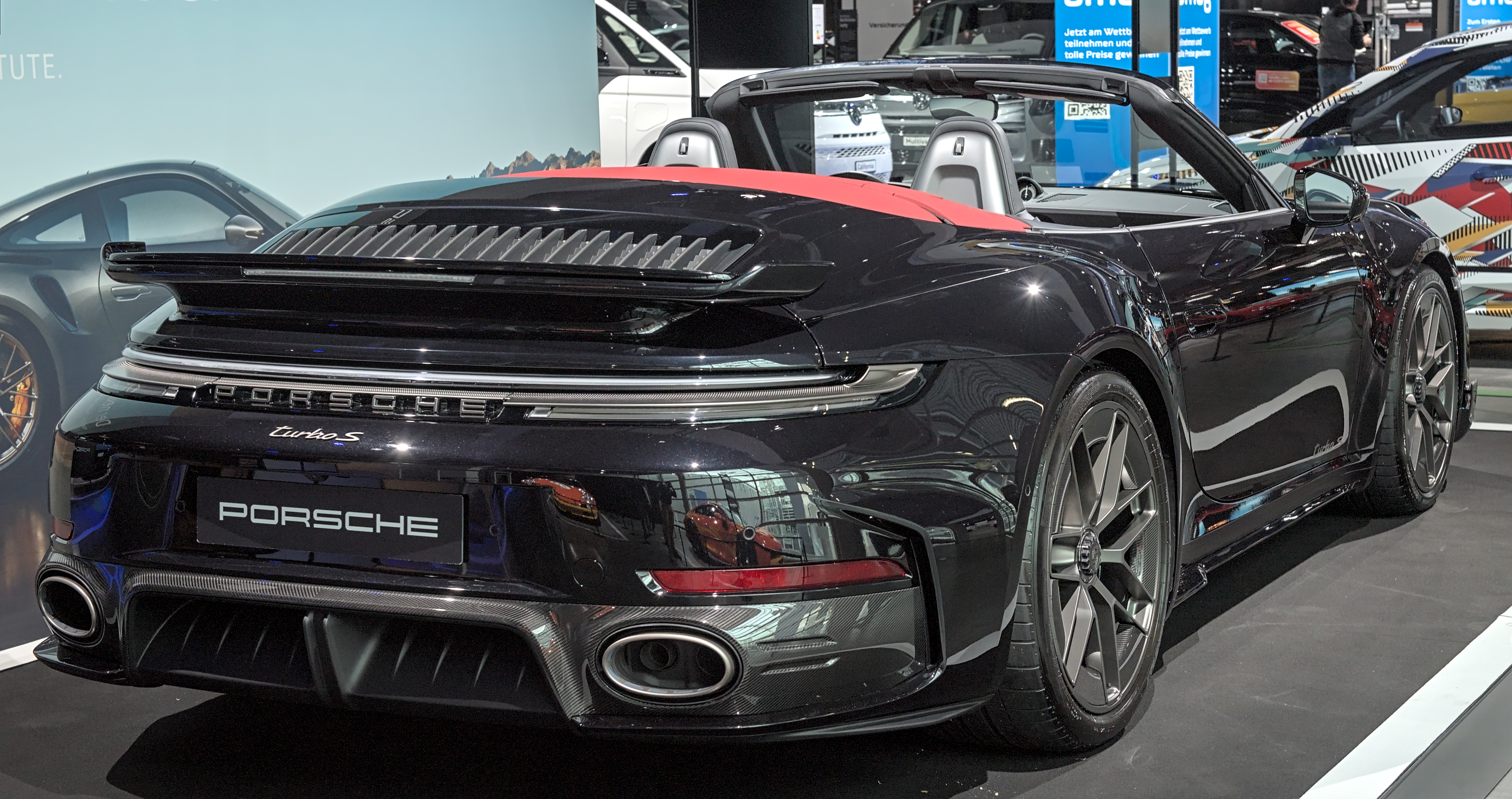
Rear view

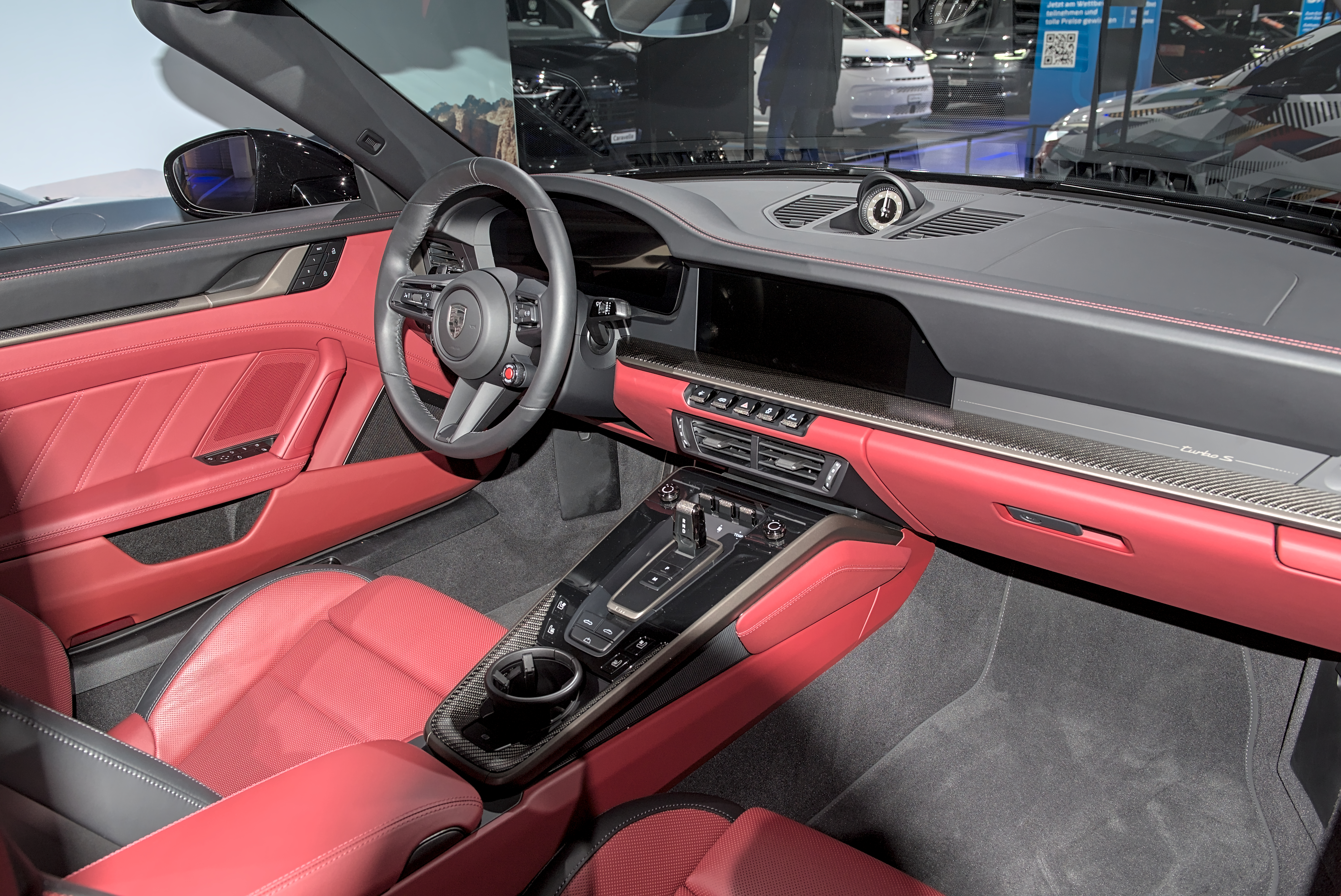
Interior

== Specifications ==
=== Engines ===
Model	Years	Engine	Power	Torque
Carrera, Carrera 4, Targa 4 (992.1)	2019–2024	2,981 cc (3.0 L) twin-turbocharged flat-six (91 × 76.4 mm)	385 PS (380 hp; 283 kW) at 6,500 rpm	450 N⋅m (332 lb⋅ft) at 1,950–5,000 rpm
Carrera T (992.1)	2022–2024	2,981 cc (3.0 L) twin-turbocharged flat-six (91 × 76.4 mm)	385 PS (380 hp; 283 kW) at 6,500 rpm	450 N⋅m (332 lb⋅ft) at 1,950–5,000 rpm
Carrera, Carrera T (992.2)	2025–	2,981 cc (3.0 L) twin-turbocharged flat-six (91 × 76.4 mm)	394 PS (389 hp; 290 kW) at 6,500 rpm	450 N·m (331 lb·ft) of torque at 6,500 rpm
Carrera S, Carrera 4S, Targa 4S (992.1)	2019–2024	2,981 cc (3.0 L) twin-turbocharged flat-six (91 × 76.4 mm)	450 PS (444 hp; 331 kW) at 6,500 rpm	530 N⋅m (391 lb⋅ft) at 2,300–5,000 rpm
Carrera S, Carrera 4S, Targa 4S (992.2)	2025-	2,981 cc (3.0 L) twin-turbocharged flat-six (91 × 76.4 mm)	450 PS (444 hp; 331 kW) at 6,500 rpm	530 N⋅m (391 lb⋅ft) at 2,300–5,000 rpm
Carrera GTS, Carrera 4 GTS, Targa 4 GTS (992.1)	2021–2024	2,981 cc (3.0 L) twin-turbocharged flat-six (91 × 76.4 mm)	480 PS (473 hp; 353 kW) at 6,500 rpm	570 N⋅m (420 lb⋅ft) at 2,300–5,000 rpm
Dakar (992.1)	2022–2024	2,981 cc (3.0 L) twin-turbocharged flat-six (91 × 76.4 mm)	480 PS (473 hp; 353 kW) at 6,500 rpm	570 N⋅m (420 lb⋅ft) at 2,300–5,000 rpm
Carrera GTS, Carrera 4 GTS, Targa 4 GTS (992.2)	2025–	3,591 cc (3.6 L) hybrid turbocharged flat-six (97 × 81 mm)	485 PS (478 hp; 357 kW) at 6,500 rpm + 54 PS (53 hp; 40 kW)	570 N⋅m (420 lb⋅ft) at 1,500–5,500 rpm + 152 N⋅m (112 lb⋅ft)
Sport Classic (992.1)	2022	3,745 cc (3.7 L) twin-turbocharged flat-six (102 × 76.4 mm)	550 PS (542 hp; 405 kW)	600 N⋅m (443 lb⋅ft) of torque at 2,500–5,000 rpm
Turbo (992.1)	2020–2024	3,745 cc (3.7 L) twin-turbocharged flat-six (102 × 76.4 mm)	580 PS (572 hp; 427 kW) at 6,750 rpm	750 N⋅m (553 lb⋅ft) at 2,500–5,000 rpm
Turbo S (992.1)	2020–2024	3,745 cc (3.7 L) twin-turbocharged flat-six (102 × 76.4 mm)	650 PS (641 hp; 478 kW) at 6,750 rpm	800 N⋅m (590 lb⋅ft) at 2,500–4,000 rpm
Turbo S (992.2)	2025–	3,591 cc (3.6 L) hybrid twin-turbocharged flat-six (97 × 81 mm)	640 PS (631 hp; 471 kW) at 6,750 rpm + 71 PS (70 hp; 52 kW)	760 N⋅m (561 lb⋅ft) at 2,500–4,000 rpm + 40 N⋅m (30 lb⋅ft)
GT3, GT3 Touring (992.1)	2021–2024	3,996 cc (4.0 L) flat-six (102 × 81.5 mm)	510 PS (503 hp; 375 kW) at 8,400 rpm	470 N⋅m (347 lb⋅ft) at 6,100 rpm
GT3, GT3 Touring	2025-	3,996 cc (4.0 L) flat-six (102 × 81.5 mm)	510 PS (503 hp; 375 kW) at 8,400 rpm	450 N⋅m (332 lb⋅ft) at 6,100 rpm
GT3 S/C	2026-	3,996 cc (4.0 L) flat-six (102 × 81.5 mm)	510 PS (503 hp; 375 kW) at 8,400 rpm	450 N⋅m (332 lb⋅ft) at 6,100 rpm
GT3 RS, S/T (992.1)	2023–2024	3,996 cc (4.0 L) flat-six (102 × 81.5 mm)	525 PS (518 hp; 386 kW) at 8,500 rpm	465 N⋅m (343 lb⋅ft) at 6,300 rpm

=== Performance ===
Model	Years	Transmission	Acceleration (0–100 km/h (62 mph))	Top speed	Weight (DIN)	Emissions CO_{2} (NEDC)
Carrera (992.2)	2025–	8-speed PDK	3.9 seconds (SC: 3.7 seconds)	295 km/h (183 mph)	1,516 kg (3,342 lb)	———————
Carrera Cabriolet (992.2)	2025–	8-speed PDK	4.1 seconds	293 km/h (181 mph)	1,599 kg (3,525 lb)	———————
Carrera T (992.1)	2022–	7-speed manual	4.5 seconds	291 km/h (181 mph)	1,505 kg (3,318 lb)	215 g/km
Dakar (992.1)	2022–	8-speed PDK	3.4 seconds	240 km/h (149 mph)	1,605 kg (3,539 lbs)	256 g/km
Carrera (992.1)	2019–	8-speed PDK	4.2 seconds (SC: 4.0 seconds)	295 km/h (183 mph)	1,505 kg (3,318 lb)	215 g/km
Carrera Cabriolet (992.1)	2019–	8-speed PDK	4.4 seconds (SC: 4.2 seconds)	293 km/h (182 mph)	1,575 kg (3,472 lb)	218 g/km
Carrera 4 (992.1)	2019–	8-speed PDK	4.2 seconds (SC: 4.0 seconds)	293 km/h (182 mph)	1,555 kg (3,428 lb)	218 g/km
Carrera 4 Cabriolet (992.1)	2019–	8-speed PDK	4.4 seconds (SC: 4.2 seconds)	290 km/h (180 mph)	1,625 kg (3,583 lb)	221 g/km
Carrera S (992.1)	2020–	7-speed manual	SC: 4.2 seconds	308 km/h (191 mph)	1,480 kg (3,263 lb)	227 g/km
Carrera S (992.1)	2019–	8-speed PDK	3.7 seconds (SC: 3.5 seconds)	308 km/h (191 mph)	1,515 kg (3,340 lb)	220 g/km
Carrera S Cabriolet (992.1)	2020–	7-speed manual	SC: 4.4 seconds	306 km/h (190 mph)	1,550 kg (3,417 lb)	230 g/km
Carrera S Cabriolet (992.1)	2019–	8-speed PDK	3.9 seconds (SC: 3.7 seconds)	306 km/h (190 mph)	1,585 kg (3,494 lb)	223 g/km
Carrera 4S (992.1)	2020–	7-speed manual	SC: 4.2 seconds	306 km/h (190 mph)	1,530 kg (3,373 lb)	231 g/km
Carrera 4S (992.1)	2019–	8-speed PDK	3.6 seconds (SC: 3.4 seconds)	306 km/h (190 mph)	1,565 kg (3,450 lb)	222 g/km
Carrera 4S Cabriolet (992.1)	2020–	7-speed manual	SC: 4.4 seconds	306 km/h (190 mph)	1,600 kg (3,527 lb)	234 g/km
Carrera 4S Cabriolet (992.1)	2019–	8-speed PDK	3.8 seconds (SC: 3.6 seconds)	304 km/h (189 mph)	1,635 kg (3,605 lb)	225 g/km
Carrera GTS (992.1)	2021–	7-speed manual	SC: 4.1 seconds	312 km/h (194 mph)	1,510 kg (3,329 lb)	234 g/km
Carrera GTS (992.1)	2021–	8-speed PDK	SC: 3.4 seconds	312 km/h (194 mph)	1,545 kg (3,406 lb)	221 g/km
Carrera GTS Cabriolet (992.1)	2021–	7-speed manual	SC: 4.3 seconds	310 km/h (193 mph)	1,580 kg (3,483 lb)	238 g/km
Carrera GTS Cabriolet (992.1)	2021–	8-speed PDK	SC: 3.6 seconds	310 km/h (193 mph)	1,615 kg (3,560 lb)	224 g/km
Carrera 4 GTS (992.1)	2021–	7-speed manual	SC: 4.1 seconds	310 km/h (193 mph)	1,560 kg (3,439 lb)	240 g/km
Carrera 4 GTS (992.1)	2021–	8-speed PDK	SC: 3.3 seconds	310 km/h (193 mph)	1,595 kg (3,516 lb)	222 g/km
Carrera 4 GTS Cabriolet (992.1)	2021–	7-speed manual	SC: 4.3 seconds	308 km/h (191 mph)	1,630 kg (3,594 lb)	242 g/km
Carrera 4 GTS Cabriolet (992.1)	2021–	8-speed PDK	SC: 3.5 seconds	308 km/h (191 mph)	1,630 kg (3,594 lb)	226 g/km
Targa 4 (992.1)	2020–	8-speed PDK	4.4 seconds (SC: 4.2 seconds)	290 km/h (180 mph)	1,665 kg (3,671 lb)	223 g/km
Targa 4S (992.1)	2020–	7-speed manual	SC: 4.4 seconds	304 km/h (189 mph)	1,640 kg (3,616 lb)	235 g/km
Targa 4S (992.1)	2020–	8-speed PDK	3.8 seconds (SC: 3.6 seconds)	304 km/h (189 mph)	1,675 kg (3,693 lb)	227 g/km
Targa 4 GTS (992.1)	2021–	7-speed manual	SC: 4.3 seconds	308 km/h (191 mph)	1,650 kg (3,638 lb)	243 g/km
Targa 4 GTS (992.1)	2021–	8-speed PDK	SC: 3.5 seconds	308 km/h (191 mph)	1,685 kg (3,715 lb)	227 g/km
Turbo (992.1)	2020–	8-speed PDK	2.8 seconds	320 km/h (199 mph)	1,630 kg (3,594 lb)	254 g/km
Turbo Cabriolet (992.1)	2020–	8-speed PDK	2.9 seconds	320 km/h (199 mph)	1,700 kg (3,748 lb)	257 g/km
Turbo S (992.1)	2020–	8-speed PDK	2.7 seconds	330 km/h (205 mph)	1,640 kg (3,616 lb)	254 g/km
Turbo S Cabriolet (992.1)	2020–	8-speed PDK	2.8 seconds	330 km/h (205 mph)	1,710 kg (3,770 lb)	257 g/km
GT3/GT3 Touring (992.1)	2021–	7-speed PDK	3.4 seconds	318 km/h (198 mph)	1,435 kg (3,164 lb)	283 g/km
GT3/GT3 Touring (992.1)	2021–	6-speed manual	3.8 seconds	320 km/h (199 mph)	1,418 kg (3,126 lb)	304 g/km
GT3 RS (992.1)	2023–	7-speed PDK	3.0 seconds	296 km/h (184 mph)	1,450 kg (3,197 lb)	291 g/km
S/T (992.1)	2024–	6-speed manual	3.7 seconds	300 km/h (186 mph)	1,380 kg (3,042 lb)	313 g/km
Carrera GTS T-Hybrid (992.2)	2025–	8-speed PDK	3.0 seconds	312 km/h (194 mph)	1,595 kg (3,516 lb)	———————
Carrera 4 GTS T-Hybrid (992.2)	2025–	8-speed PDK	3.0 seconds	312 km/h (194 mph)	1,645 kg (3,627 lb)	———————
Targa 4 GTS T-Hybrid (992.2)	2025–	8-speed PDK	3.1 seconds	312 km/h (194 mph)	1,745 kg (3,847 lb)	———————
Carrera 4 GTS T-Hybrid Cabriolet (992.2)	2025–	8-speed PDK	3.1 seconds	312 km/h (194 mph)	1,745 kg (3,847 lb)	———————
Carrera GTS T-Hybrid Cabriolet (992.2)	2025–	8-speed PDK	3.1 seconds	312 km/h (194 mph)	1,675 kg (3,693 lb)	———————

^{SC} = With Sport Chrono Package (included as standard with manual transmission).

== Marketing ==
Porsche Design sold a 911 Speaker inspired by the vehicle. The series also includes a 911 Soundbar with Black Edition - Limited Edition variant, where the Limited Edition was inspired by 911 GT3 and made in 911 units. A 911 Soundbar Special Edition version was sold via Porsche Smart Mobility Canada Ltd. with limit of 500 units.
